= Mexico–United States border wall =

Series of border barriers

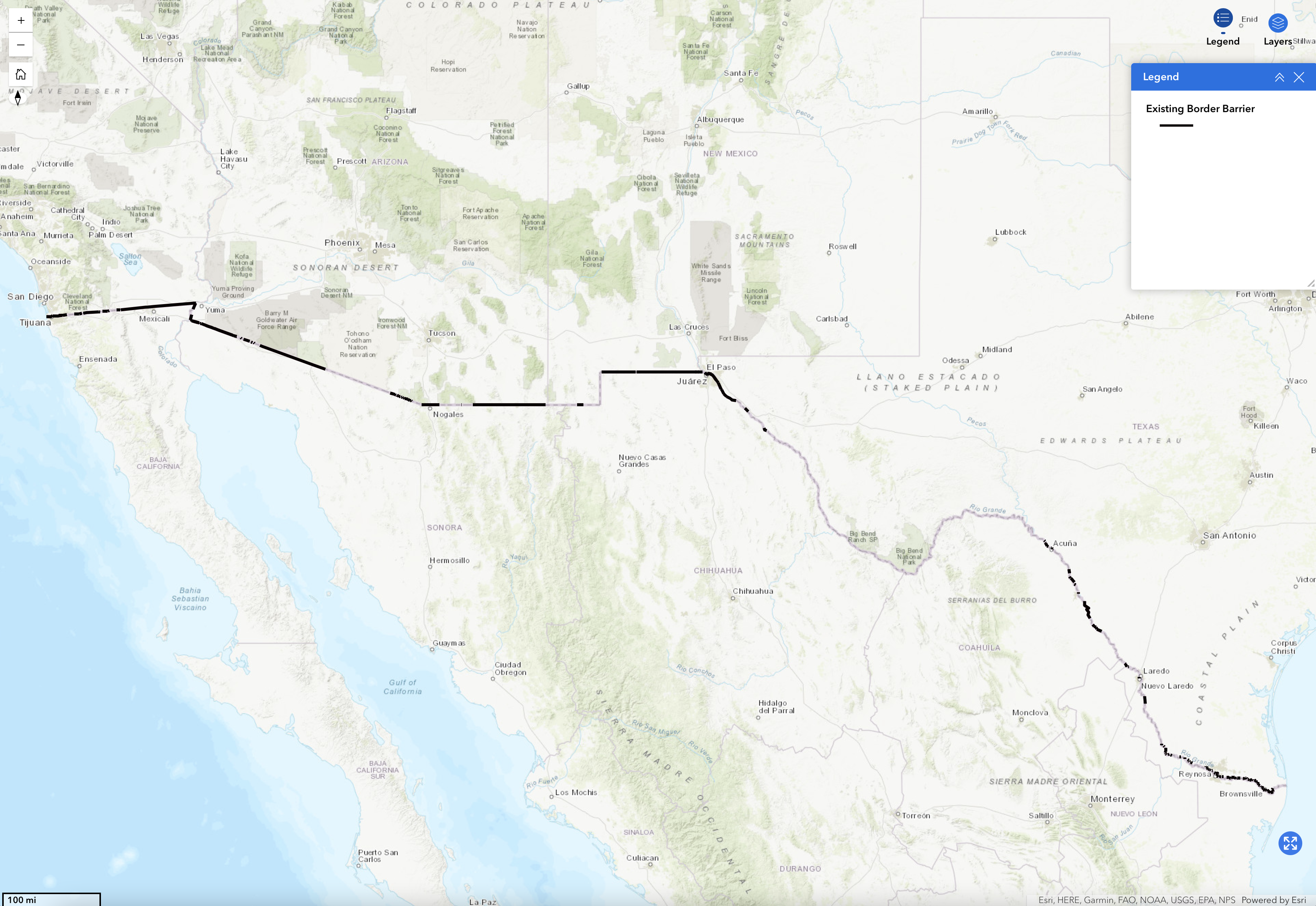
- Smart Wall Map Displaying Existing Border Barrier - January 20, 2025

Characteristics
- Entities: Mexico US
- Length: Border length: 1,954 mi (3,145 km); Planned border barrier lengths: Primary wall: 1,407 mi (2,264 km); Vehicle barrier: 183 mi (295 km); Waterborne barrier: 533 mi (858 km); Secondary wall: 653 mi (1,051 km); Detection technology (only): ~372 mi (599 km); Additional technology (for previously built wall): ~538 mi (866 km)

History
- Established: 1990; 36 years ago
- Notes: https://www.cbp.gov/border-security/along-us-borders/smart-wall-map; https://www.spd.usace.army.mil/Border-Task-Force

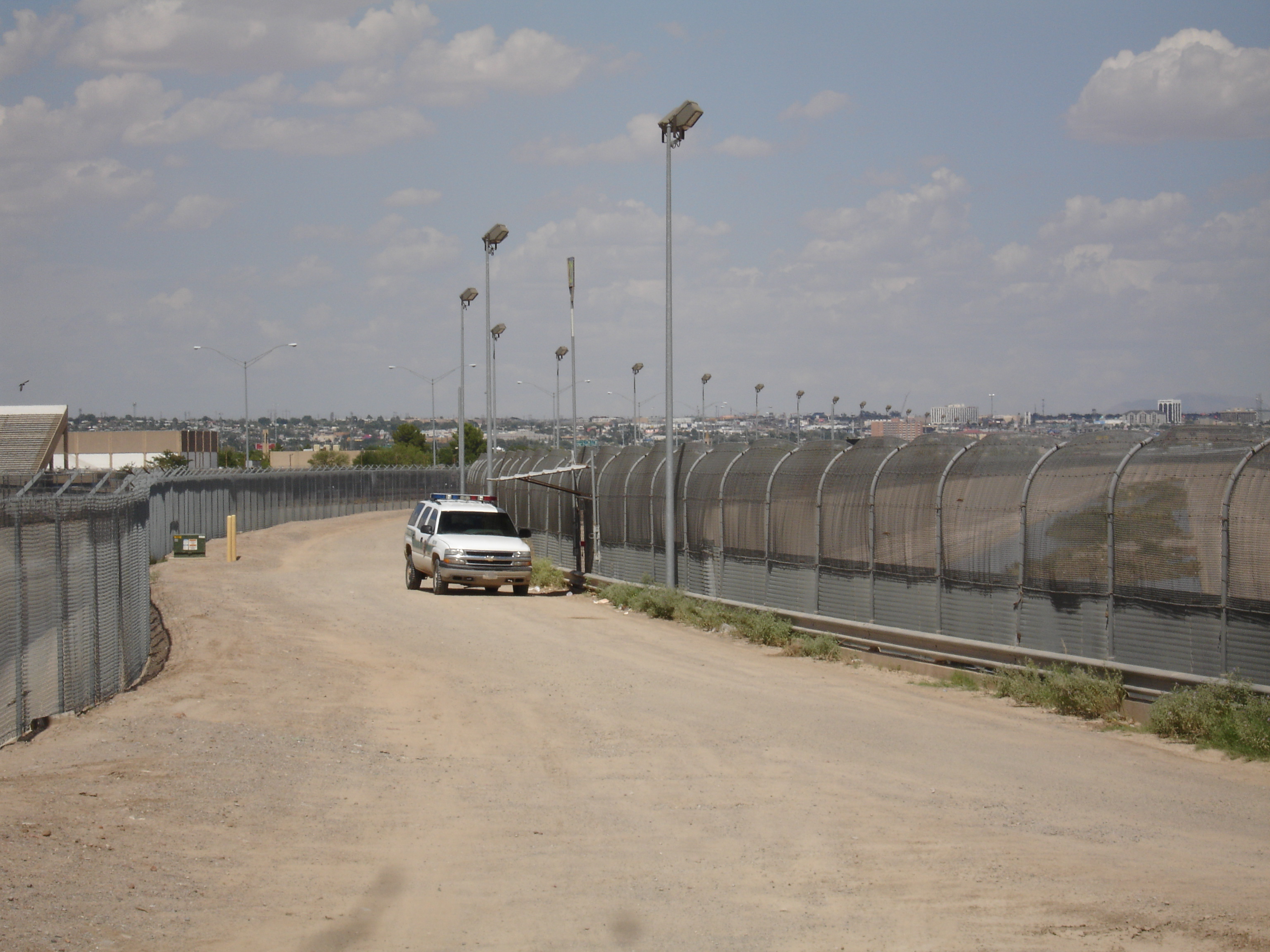
Border fence near El Paso, Texas, in the mid-2000s

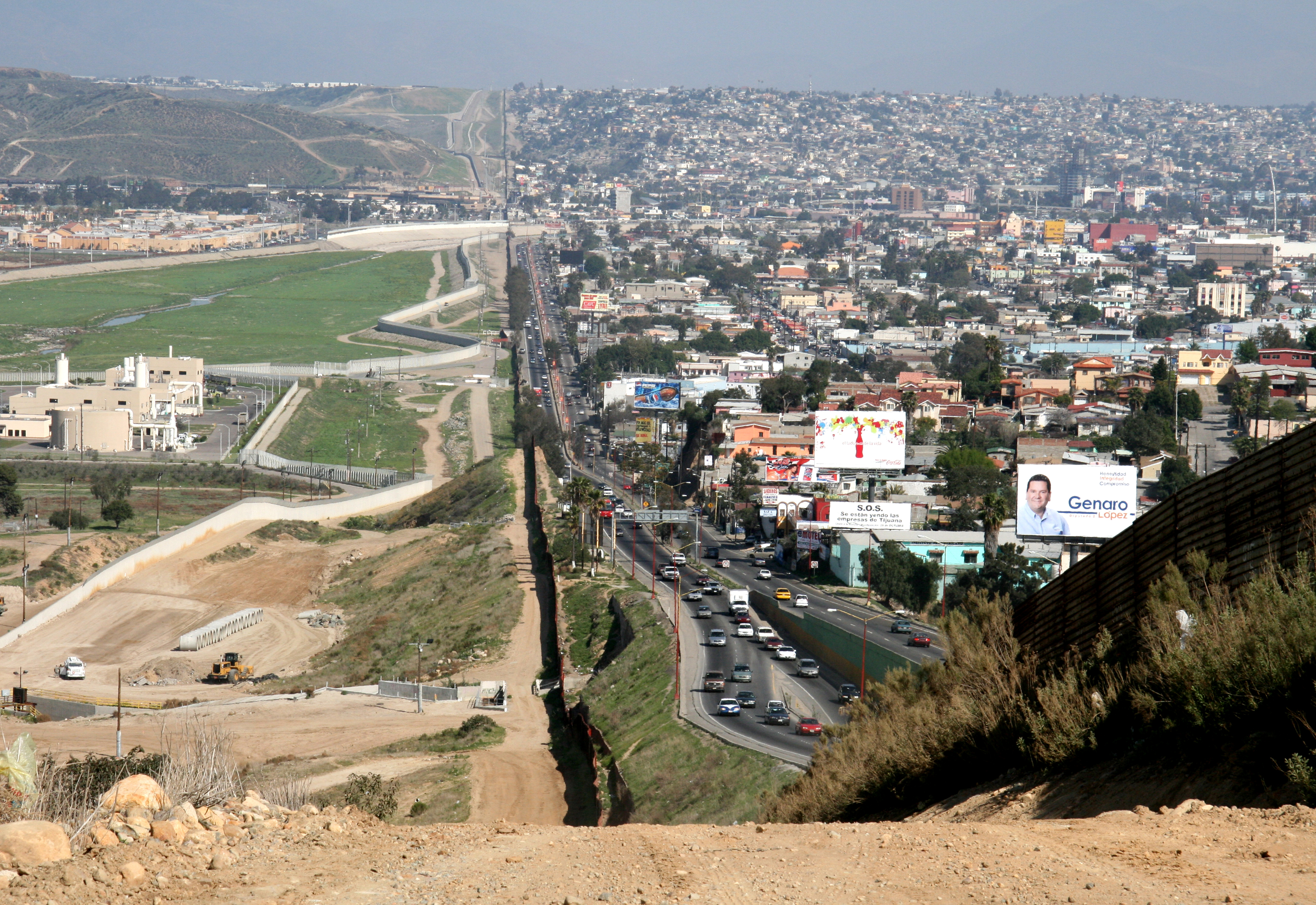
Border fence between San Diego's border patrol offices in California, U.S. (left) and Tijuana, Mexico (right)

A border wall is being built along portions of the Mexico–United States border in an attempt to reduce illegal immigration to the United States from Mexico. The barrier is not a continuous structure but a series of obstructions variously classified as "fences" or "walls".

Between the physical barriers, security is provided by a "virtual fence" of sensors, cameras, and other surveillance equipment used to dispatch United States Border Patrol (USBP) agents to suspected migrant crossings. In May 2011, the Department of Homeland Security (DHS) said it had 649 miles (1,044 km) of barriers in place, comprising a mix of pedestrian fence and vehicle barrier. In Donald Trump's first presidency, 458 miles (737 km) of wall was constructed and it was dubbed the "Trump Wall", although the majority of it replaced outdated or dilapidated barriers instead of being in locations where no barriers had previously existed. At the end of President Trump's first term, an additional 206 miles of wall remained under contract, while 74 miles of wall were in the pre-construction phase and had not yet been awarded. President Trump had repeatedly promised a "giant wall" spanning the entire border and falsely claimed Mexico would "pay for the wall" on numerous occasions. The national border's length is 1,954 miles (3,145 km), of which 1,255 miles (2,020 km) is the Rio Grande and 699 miles (1,125 km) is on land.

President Joe Biden signed an executive order on his first day of office, January 20, 2021, which ordered a pause in all construction of the border wall no later than January 27, 2021. By December 2021, many contracts had been cancelled. On July 28, 2022, the Biden administration announced it would fill four wide border wall gaps in Arizona near Yuma, an area with some of the busiest corridors for illegal crossings. In October 2023, President Biden announced that he was restarting border wall construction on some parts of the border due to the surge of migrant crossings, constructing an additional 20 miles (32 km) of border wall.

In January 2025, re-elected president Trump pledged to finish the border wall during his second term. The amount of existing Wall (prior to 1/20/2025) that met USBP operational requirements was ~644 miles of Primary Wall and ~75 miles of Secondary Wall. On October 10, 2025, the initiative was officially designated as a "Smart Wall", with an interactive Smart Wall Map Page, to reflect the layers of "System Attributes" and other detection technology that would be incorporated into the design. In a May 2026 interview, DHS secretary Markwayne Mullin stated that he expected the Primary Wall to be completed by April or June 2027 with the Secondary Wall and other components to be completed before Trump left office. In a June 11, 2026 interview, Customs and Border Protection (CBP) commissioner Rodney S. Scott stated that CBP was building about 6 miles of wall per week, that he made a commitment to President Trump that the Primary Wall would be completed by the end of 2027 and that the entire system would be completed by July 2028. On September 18, 2026, it was reported that CBP was constructing an average of 12 miles of barrier per week. In an October 20, 2026 interview, DHS secretary Markwayne Mullin stated that CBP was purchasing and installing new technology for the wall at a record pace, and although construction had been slightly slowed by lawsuits from environmental groups and land disputes, the Primary Wall would be finished in 2027. On November 17, 2026, a CBP spokesperson stated that construction is steadily advancing toward its targets, and primary border wall completion is projected for January 2028.

CBP publishes construction progress updates to its Smart Wall Map Page. As of November 18, 2026, CBP has completed:

- 99.8 miles of 626 miles of planned new Primary Border Wall;
- 48.5 miles of 137 miles of planned replacement Primary Border Wall;
- 0 miles of 183 miles of planned Vehicle Barrier;
- 82.9 miles of 533 miles of planned Waterborne Barrier System; and
- 133.4 miles of 578 miles of planned new Secondary Border Wall.

== Description ==
The 1,954-mile (3,145-kilometer) border between Mexico and the U.S. traverses a variety of terrain, including urban areas and deserts. The border from the Gulf of Mexico to El Paso, Texas, follows the Rio Grande, a natural barrier. The barrier is on both urban and uninhabited sections of the border, where the most illegal crossings and drug trafficking have been observed in the past. These urban areas include San Diego, California, and El Paso, Texas. The fencing includes a steel fence varying in height between 18 and 27 feet (5.5 and 8.2 m) that divides the border towns of Nogales, Arizona, in the U.S. and Nogales, Sonora, in Mexico.

97% of border apprehensions (foreign nationals caught in the U.S. illegally) by the Border Patrol in 2010 occurred at the southwest border. The number declined 61% from 1,189,000 in 2005 to 723,842 in 2008 to 463,000 in 2010. The decrease in apprehensions is the result of numerous factors, including changes in U.S. economic conditions and border enforcement efforts. Border apprehensions in 2010 were at their lowest level since 1972. Total apprehensions for 2017, 2018, and 2019 were 415,517, 521,090, and 977,509, respectively. And while the barrier is along the border with Mexico, 80% of those apprehended are not Mexican.

As a result of the barrier, the number of people trying to cross in areas that have no fence, such as the Sonoran Desert and the Baboquivari Mountains in Arizona, has increased. Such immigrants must cross 50 miles (80 km) of inhospitable terrain to reach the first road, which is in the Tohono Oʼodham Indian Reservation.

== Geography ==
The Mexico–U.S. border stretches from the Pacific Ocean in the west to the Gulf of Mexico in the east. Border states include the Mexican states of Baja California, Sonora, Chihuahua, Coahuila, Nuevo León, and Tamaulipas and the U.S. states of California, Arizona, New Mexico, and Texas.

Border by U.S. state
U.S. state	Border length	Mexican states
California	140.4 miles (226.0 km)	Baja California
Arizona	372.5 miles (599.5 km)	Baja California, Sonora
New Mexico	179.5 miles (288.9 km)	Sonora, Chihuahua
Texas	1,241.0 miles (1,997.2 km)	Chihuahua, Coahuila, Nuevo León, Tamaulipas
Total	1,933.4 miles (3,111.5 km)	—N/a

== History ==
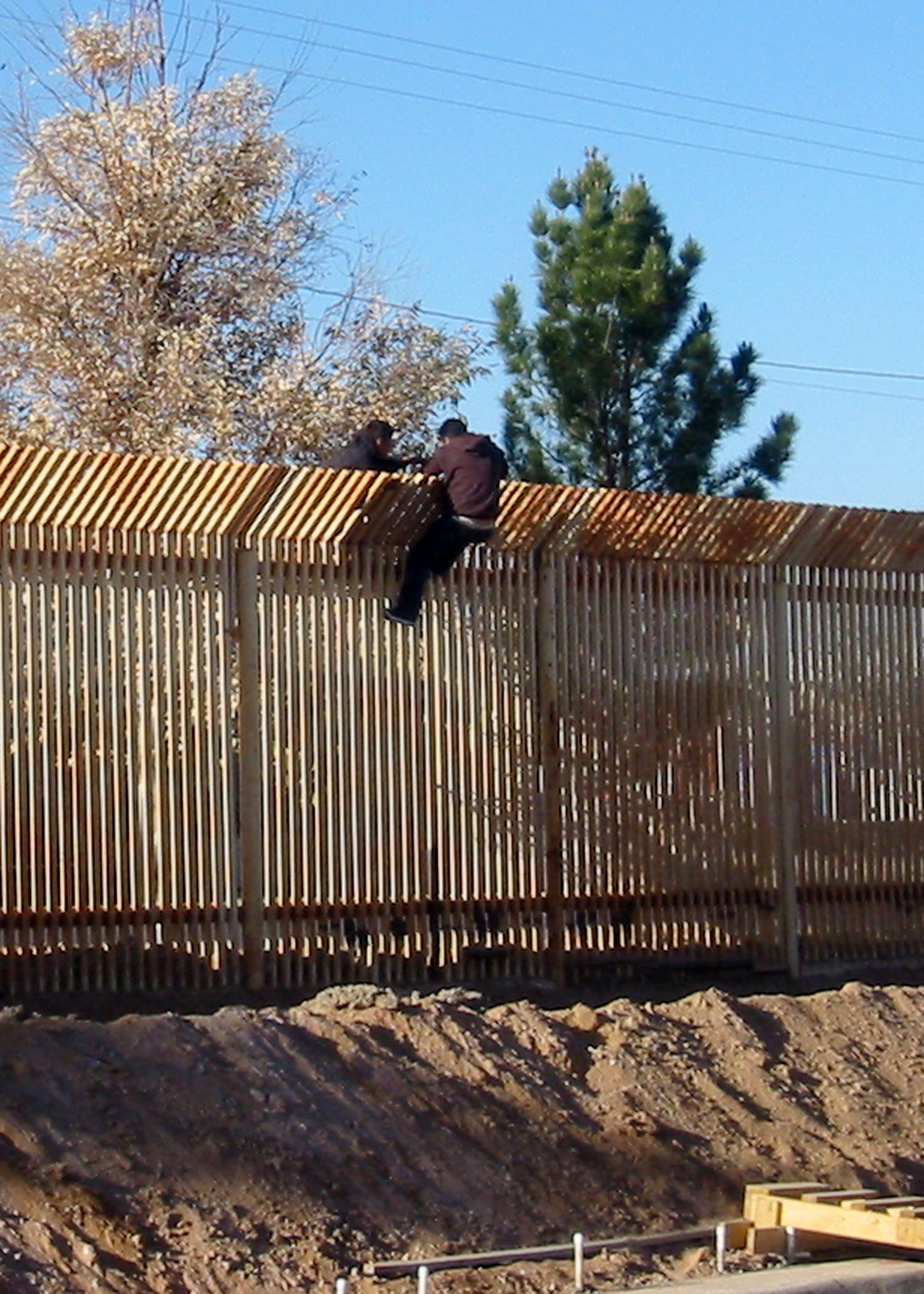
Two men scale the border fence into Mexico near Douglas, Arizona, in 2009

=== Origins ===
Territorial exchanges in the Mexican–American War (1846–1848) and the Gadsden Purchase (1853) largely established the current U.S.–Mexico border. Until the early 20th century, the border was open and largely unpatrolled, with only a few "mounted guards" patrolling its length. But tensions between the U.S. and Mexico began to rise with the Mexican Revolution (1910) and World War I, which also increased concerns about weapons smuggling, refugees and cross-border espionage. The first international bridge was the Brownsville & Matamoros International Bridge, built in 1910. The first barrier built by the U.S. (a barbed-wire fence to prevent the movement of cattle across the border) was built in Ambos Nogales between 1909 and 1911, and was expanded in 1929 with a "six foot–high chain-link fence". The first barrier built by Mexico was likely a 6-foot (1.8 m)-tall wire fence built in 1918 explicitly for the purpose of directing the flow of people, also in Ambos Nogales. Barriers were extended in the following decades and became a common feature in border towns by the 1920s. In the 1940s, the U.S. Immigration and Naturalization Service built chain-link barriers along the border.

The U.S. Congress approved a $4.3 million request by Immigration and Naturalization Service, in 1978, to build a fence along the border to replace an existing 27-mile (43 km) fence near San Ysidro, California, and El Paso, Texas, and then build an additional 6 miles (9.7 km) of new fence. Anchor Post Products was contracted to build the new fence in a project inherited from Richard Nixon, who was the first president to propose building a border fence. The proposed construction received press coverage after the company's George Norris, described the fence as a "razor-sharp wall", leading to negative responses in Mexico. The proposed wall, dubbed the "Tortilla Curtain" by critics, was condemned by Mexican politicians such as then-president José López Portillo, and it was raised as an issue during President Jimmy Carter's state visit to Mexico in February 1979. Fencing was ultimately constructed, but had a limited length and did not have razor wire.

U.S. president George H. W. Bush approved the initial 14 miles (22.5 km) of fencing along the San Diego–Tijuana border. In 1993, President Bill Clinton oversaw initial border fence construction which was completed by the end of the year. Starting in 1994, further barriers were built under Clinton's presidency as part of three larger operations to taper transportation of illegal drugs manufactured in Latin America and immigration: Operation Gatekeeper in California, Operation Hold-the-Line in Texas, and Operation Safeguard in Arizona. Clinton signed the Illegal Immigration Reform and Immigrant Responsibility Act of 1996, which authorized further barriers and the reinforcement of the initial border fence. The majority of the border barriers built in the 1990s were made out of leftover helicopter landing mats from the Vietnam War. Unlike the WWII-era Marston Mats, the M8A1 used for border barrier lacked circular holes. The panels were flipped vertically and interlocked to become fencing. However, the solid, opaque wall presented susbtantial agent safety risks. Also, the mats were susceptible to under-digging, scaling and rusting over time.

=== Bush administration (2001–2009) ===
The Real ID Act, signed into law by President George W. Bush on May 11, 2005, attached a rider to a supplemental appropriations bill funding the wars in Iraq and Afghanistan, which went into effect in May 2008:

Notwithstanding any other provision of law, the Secretary of Homeland Security shall have the authority to waive all legal requirements such Secretary, in such Secretary's sole discretion, determines necessary to ensure expeditious construction of the barriers and roads.

In 2005, there were 75 miles (121 km) of fencing along the border. In 2005, the border-located Laredo Community College obtained a 10-foot (3.0 m) fence built by the United States Marine Corps. The structure led to a reported decline in border crossings onto the campus. U.S. representative Duncan Hunter of California proposed a plan on November 3, 2005, calling for the construction of a reinforced fence along the entire United States–Mexico border. This would also have included a 100-yard (91 m) border zone on the U.S. side. On December 15, 2005, Hunter's amendment to the Border Protection, Anti-terrorism, and Illegal Immigration Control Act of 2005 (H.R. 4437) passed in the House, but the bill did not pass the Senate. This plan called for mandatory fencing along 698 miles (1,123 km) of the 1,954-mile (3,145 km)-long border. On May 17, 2006, the U.S. Senate proposed the Comprehensive Immigration Reform Act of 2006 (S. 2611), which would include 370 miles (600 km) of triple-layered fencing and a vehicle fence, but the bill died in committee.

==== Secure Fence Act of 2006 ====
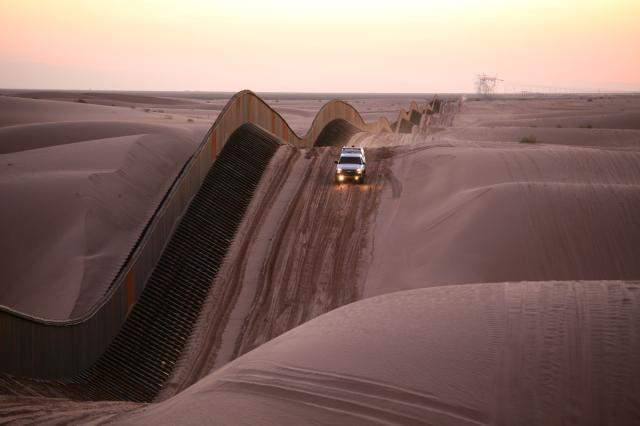
The United States Border Patrol in the Algodones Dunes, California

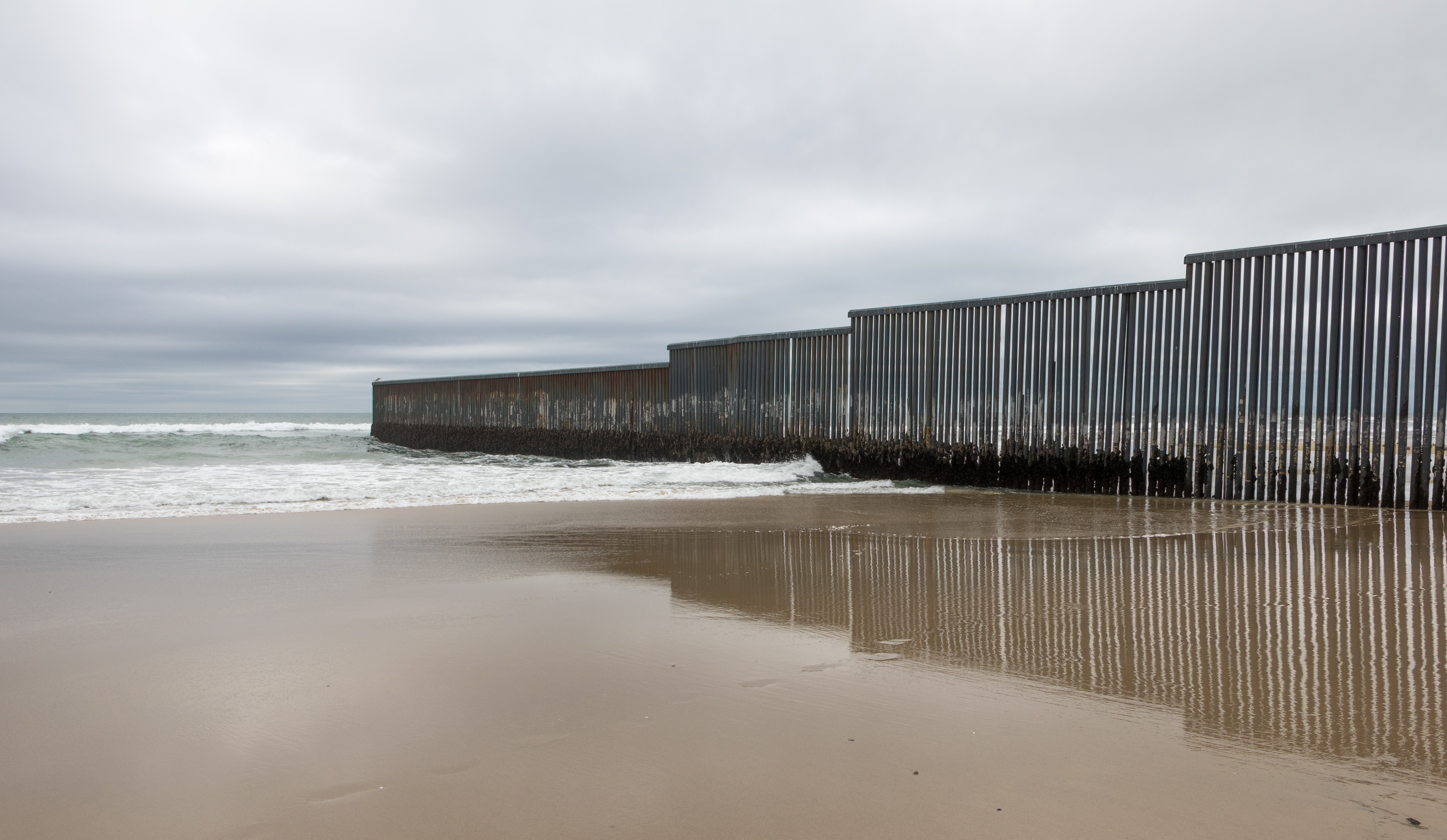
A section of the barrier, made out of steel slats, ending in the Pacific Ocean in San Diego–Tijuana

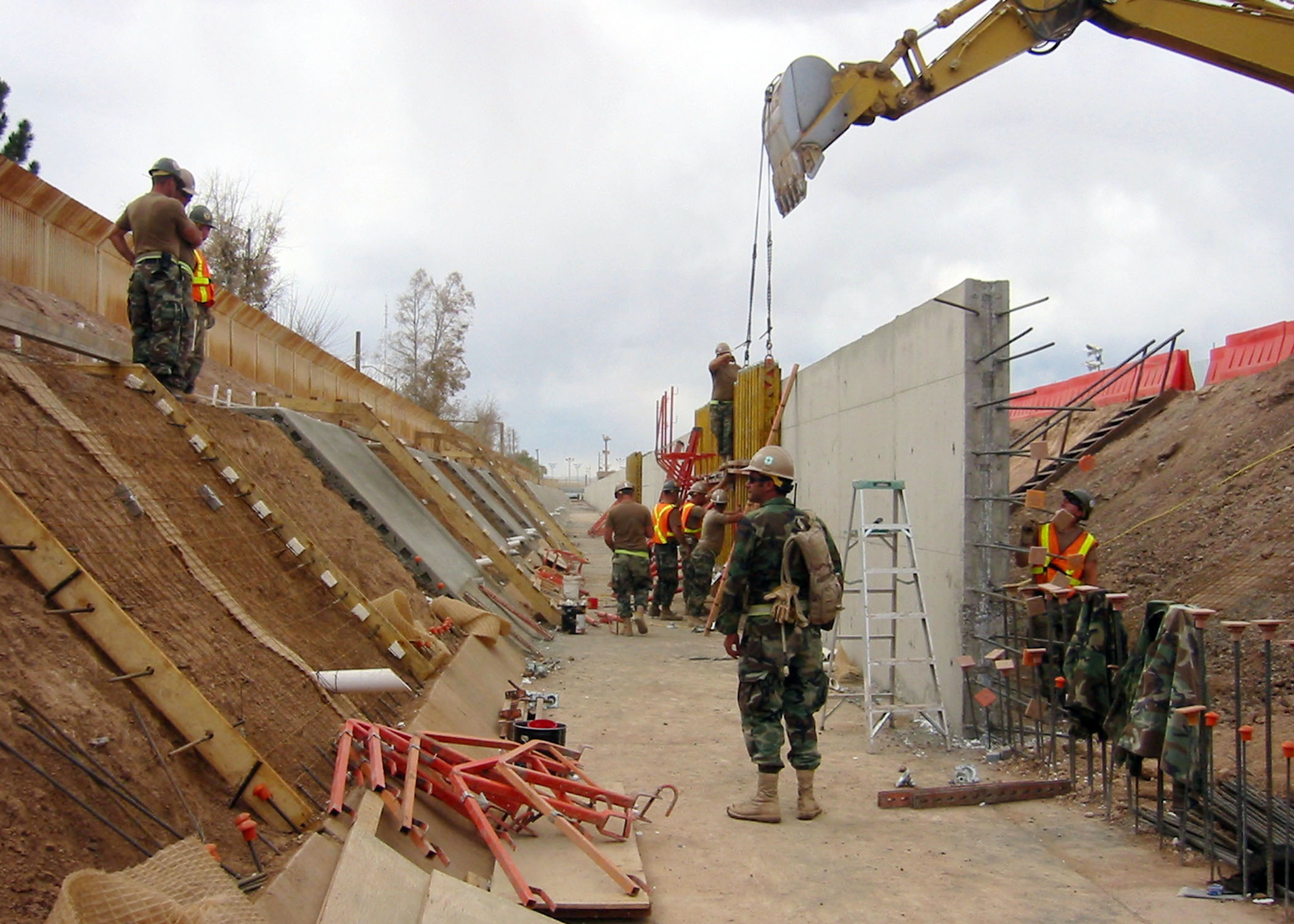
Douglas, Arizona, 2009

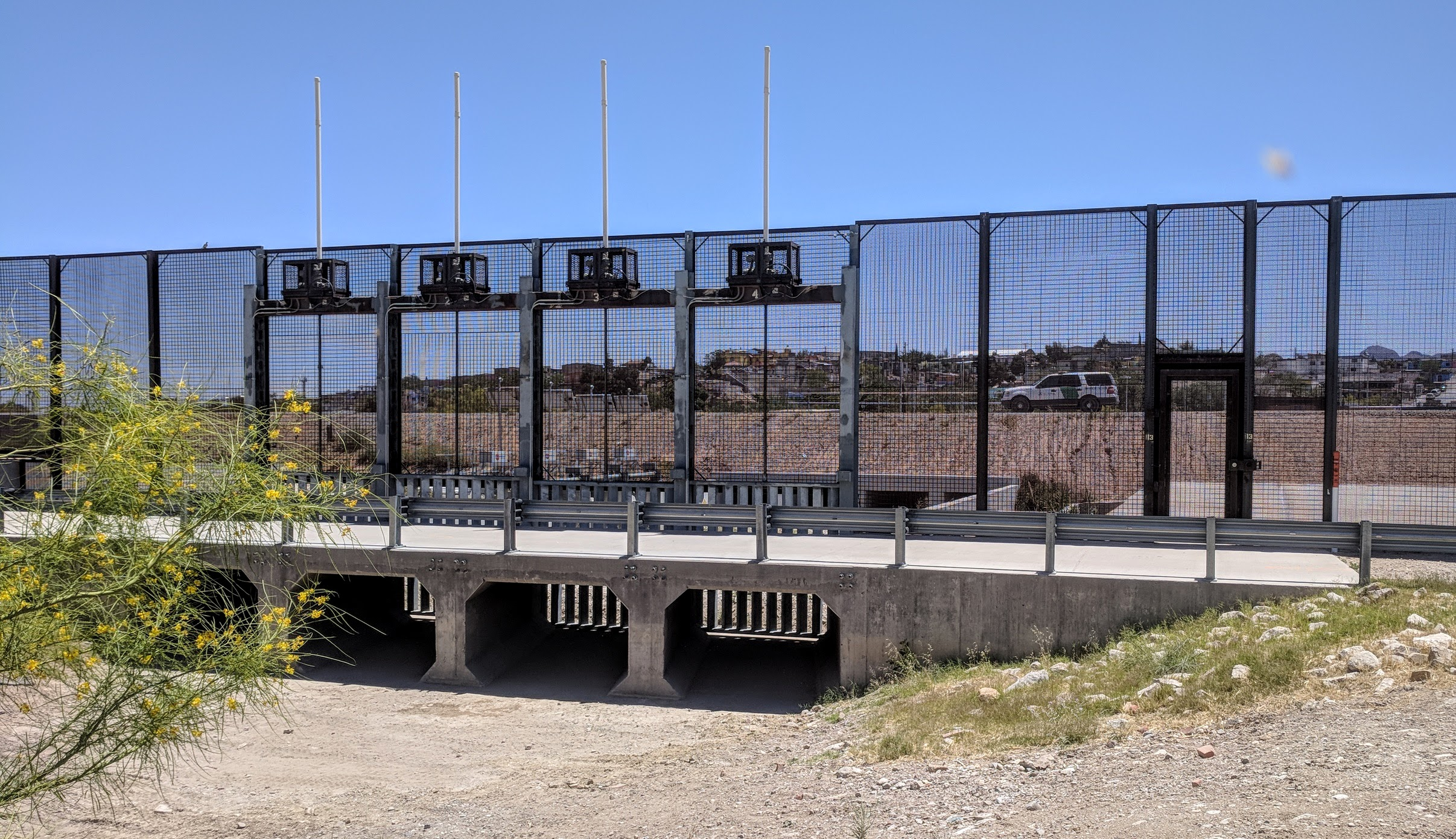
The border fence between El Paso and Juarez has an elaborate gate structure to allow floodwaters to pass under. The gates prevent people from being able to cross under and can be raised for floodwaters carrying debris. Beyond the fence is a canal and levee before the Rio Grande.

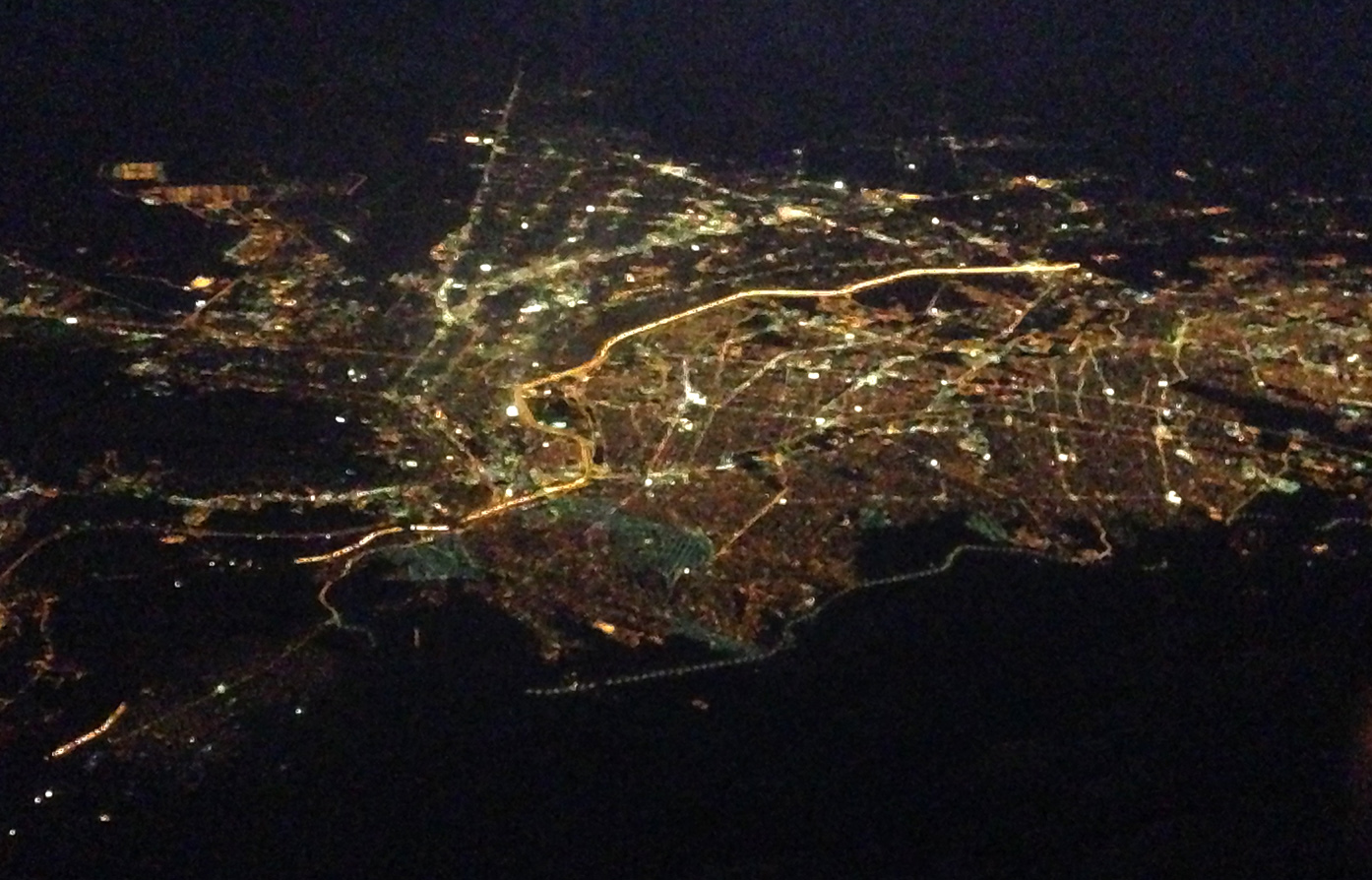
Aerial view of El Paso, Texas, (top and left) and Ciudad Juárez, Chihuahua, (bottom and right). The brightly lit border can clearly be seen as it divides the two cities at night. The dark section at left is where the border crosses Mount Cristo Rey, an unfenced rugged area.

The Secure Fence Act of 2006, signed into law on October 26, 2006, by President George W. Bush authorized and partially funded the potential construction of 700 miles (1,100 km) of physical fence/barriers along the Mexican border. The bill passed with supermajorities in both chambers. Secretary of Homeland Security Michael Chertoff announced that an eight-month test of the virtual fence he favored would precede any construction of a physical barrier.

The government of Mexico and ministers of several Latin American countries condemned the plans. Governor of Texas Rick Perry expressed his opposition, saying that the border should be more open and should support safe and legal migration with the use of technology. The barrier expansion was opposed by a unanimous vote by the Laredo, Texas, City Council. Laredo mayor Raul G. Salinas said that the bill would devastate Laredo. He stated, "These are people that are sustaining our economy by 40%, and I am gonna close the door on them and put [up] a wall? You don't do that. It's like a slap in the face." He hoped that Congress would revise the bill to better reflect the realities of life on the border.

Secretary Chertoff exercised his waiver authority on April 1, 2008, to "waive in their entirety" the Endangered Species Act, the Migratory Bird Treaty Act, the National Environmental Policy Act, the Coastal Zone Management Act, the Clean Water Act, the Clean Air Act, and the National Historic Preservation Act to extend triple fencing through the Tijuana River National Estuarine Research Reserve near San Diego. By January 2009, U.S. Customs and Border Protection (CBP) and Homeland Security had spent $40 million on environmental analysis and mitigation measures aimed at blunting any possible adverse impact that the fence might have on the environment. On January 16, 2009, DHS announced it was pledging an additional $50 million for that purpose, and signed an agreement with the U.S. Department of the Interior for use of the additional funding. In January 2009, U.S. Customs and Border Protection reported that it had more than 580 miles (930 km) of barriers in place.

=== Obama administration (2009–2017) ===
On March 16, 2010, DHS announced that there would be a halt to expanding the virtual fence beyond two pilot projects in Arizona. Contractor Boeing Corporation had numerous delays and cost overruns. Boeing had initially used police-dispatching software that was unable to process all of the information coming from the border. The $50 million of remaining funding would be used for mobile surveillance devices, sensors, and radios to patrol and protect the border. At the time, DHS had spent $3.4 billion on border fences and had built 640 miles (1,030 km) of fences and barriers as part of the Secure Border Initiative.

In May 2011, President Barack Obama stated that the wall was "basically complete", with 649 miles (1,044 km) of 652 planned miles of barrier constructed. Of this, vehicle barriers comprised 299 miles (481 km) and pedestrian fence 350 miles (560 km). Obama stated that:

We have gone above and beyond what was requested by the very Republicans who said they supported broader reform as long as we got serious about enforcement. All the stuff they asked for, we've done. But ... I suspect there are still going to be some who are trying to move the goal posts on us one more time. They'll want a higher fence. Maybe they'll need a moat. Maybe they want alligators in the moat. (Note: Privately suggested by Obama's successor, Republican Donald Trump) They'll never be satisfied. And I understand that. That's politics.

The Republican Party's 2012 platform stated that "The double-layered fencing on the border that was enacted by Congress in 2006, but never completed, must finally be built." The Secure Fence Act's costs were estimated at $6 billion, more than the Customs and Border Protection's entire annual discretionary budget of $5.6 billion. The Washington Office on Latin America noted in 2013 that the cost of complying with the Secure Fence Act's mandate was the reason that it had not been completely fulfilled.

A 2016 report by the Government Accountability Office confirmed that the government had completed the fence by 2015. A 2017 report noted that "In addition to the 654 miles (1,053 km) of primary fencing, [Customs and Border Protection] has also deployed additional layers of pedestrian fencing behind the primary border fencing, including 37 miles (60 km) of secondary fencing and 14 miles (23 km) of tertiary fencing."

=== First Trump administration (2017–2021) ===
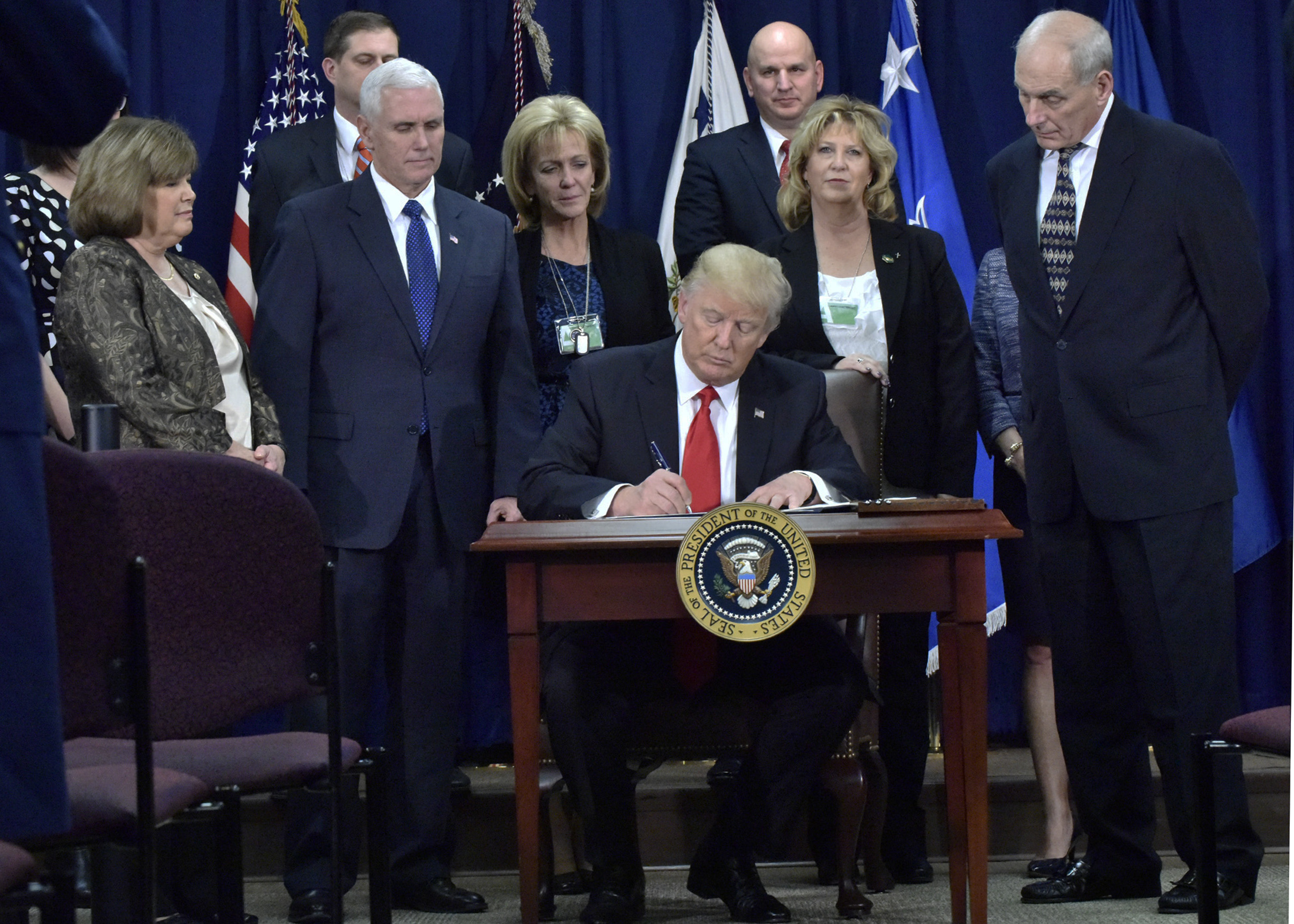
President Donald Trump signing Executive Order 13767

The concept for the proposed expansion of the border wall was developed in 2014 by Donald Trump's 2015–2016 presidential campaign advisers Sam Nunberg and Roger Stone as a talking point Trump could use to tie his business experience as a builder and developer to his immigration policy proposals. The idea for the expansion of "the Wall", as Nunberg and Stone called it, was first aired publicly in January 2015 at the Iowa Freedom Summit hosted by Citizens United and Steve King.

Trump proposed the wall's expansion again, along with a false claim that Mexico would pay for it, during his June 2015 candidacy announcement. Throughout the 2015–2016 presidential campaign, Trump called for the construction of a much larger and fortified border wall, falsely claiming that if elected, he would "build the wall and make Mexico pay for it". Mexican president Enrique Peña Nieto maintained that his country would not pay for the wall. A 2013 Bloomberg Government analysis estimated that it would cost up to $28 billion (~$38.1 billion in 2025) annually to seal the border. While campaigning for the presidency in early 2016, Trump claimed it would be a one-time cost of only $8 billion, while Republican House speaker Paul Ryan and Senate majority leader Mitch McConnell said $15 billion, and the Trump administration's own early estimates ranged up to $25 billion. The Department of Homeland Security's internal estimate in early 2017, shortly after Trump took office, was that his proposed border wall would cost $21.6 billion and take 3.5 years to build.

On January 25, 2017, the Trump administration signed Executive Order 13767, which formally directed the U.S. government to begin attempting to construct a border wall using existing federal funding, although construction did not begin at this time because a formal budget had not been developed. On February 24, 2017, United States Customs and Border Protection (CBP) announced it would accept prototype ideas for a U.S.–Mexico border wall from companies and said it would issue a request for proposals by March 24, 2017. On March 17, 2017, CBP issued two formal Requests for Proposals to acquire conceptual wall designs with the intent to construct multiple prototypes. One RFP called for "concrete" wall design and the other RFP called for an "other materials" wall design.

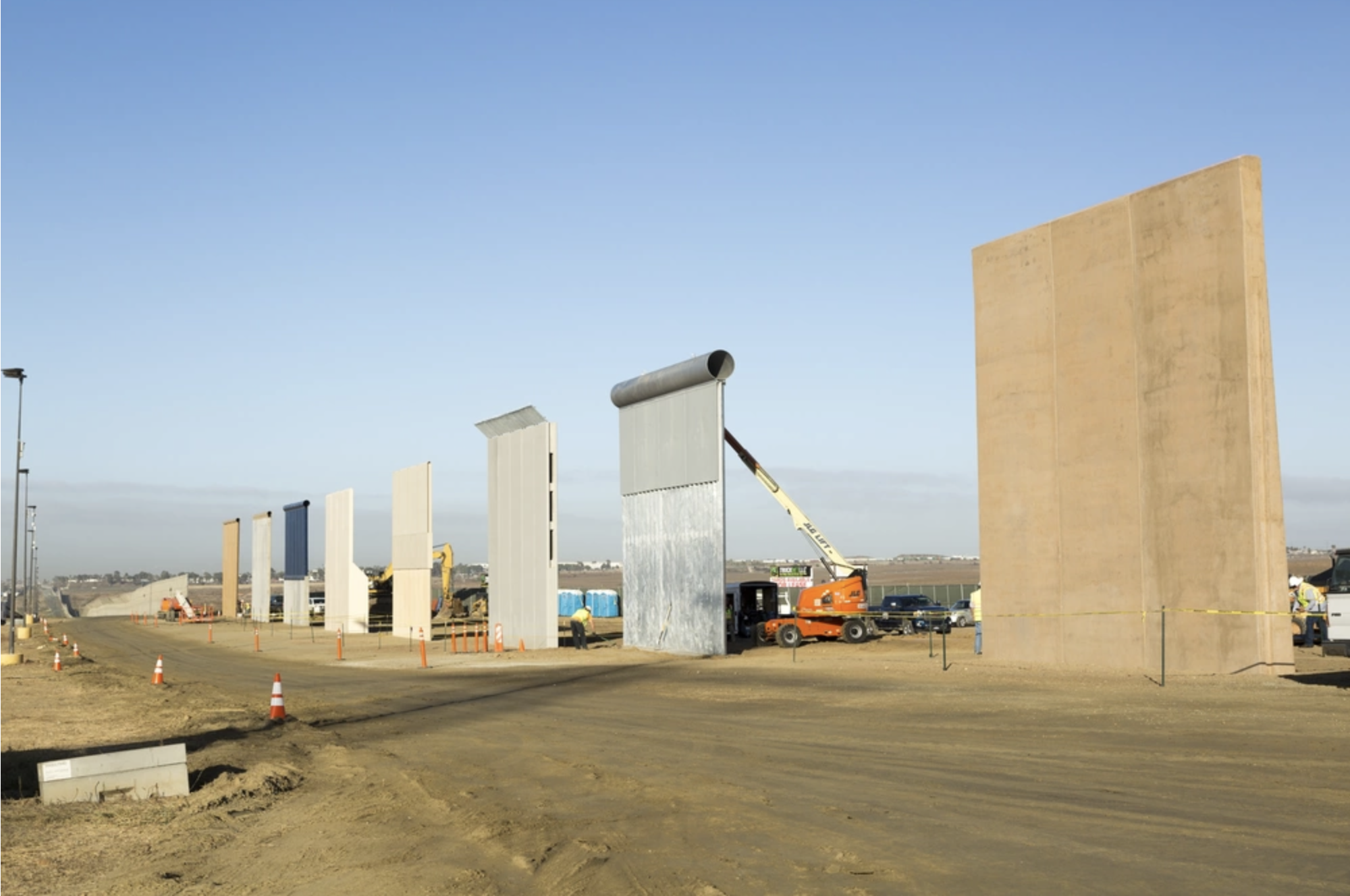
Ground views of different Border Wall Prototypes as they take shape during the Wall Prototype Construction Project near the Otay Mesa Port of Entry (October 21, 2017).

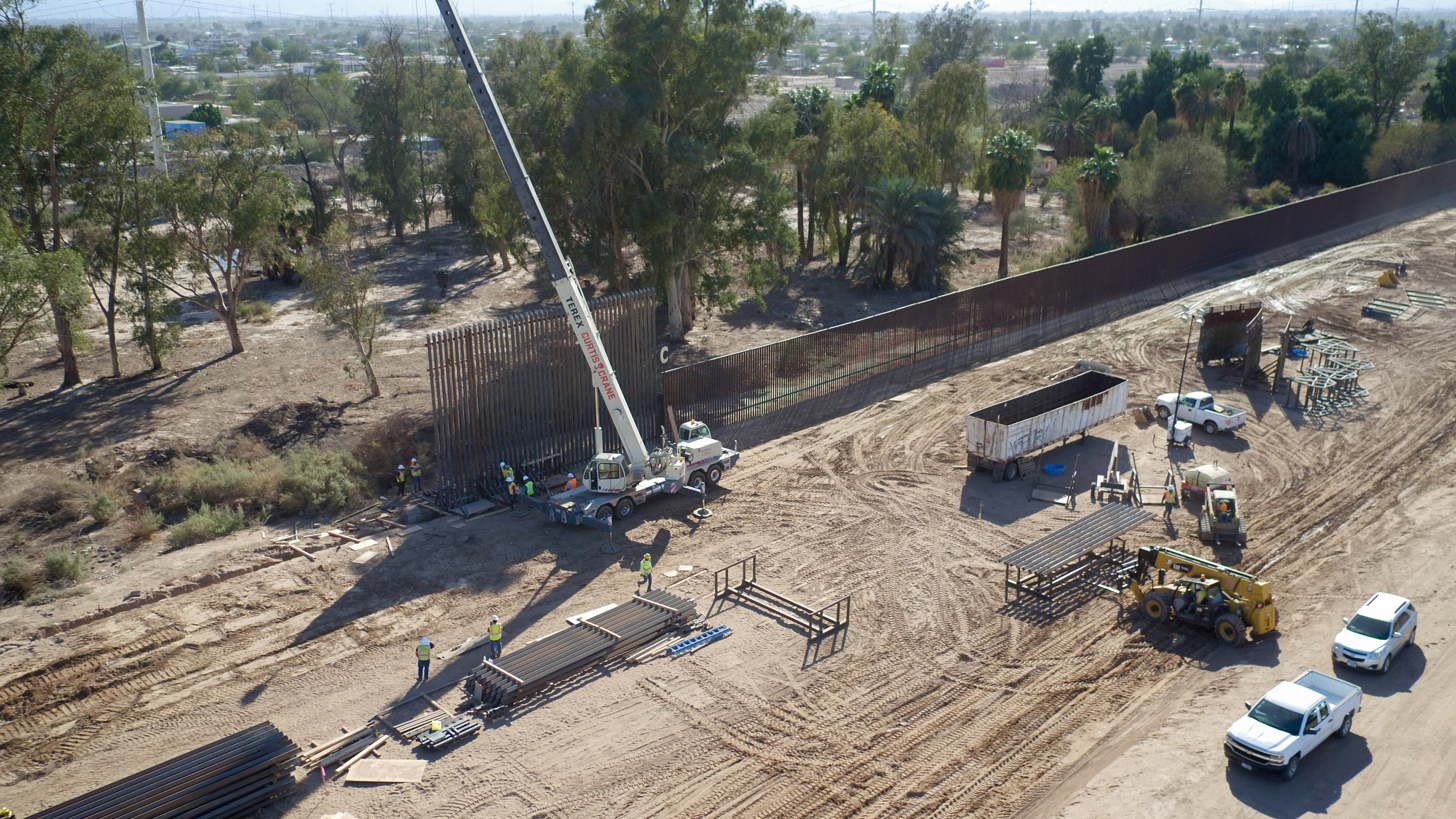
Repair work begins on a 2 1/4-mile section of Border Fence in El Centro Sector near the Calexico West Port of Entry (February 26, 2018).

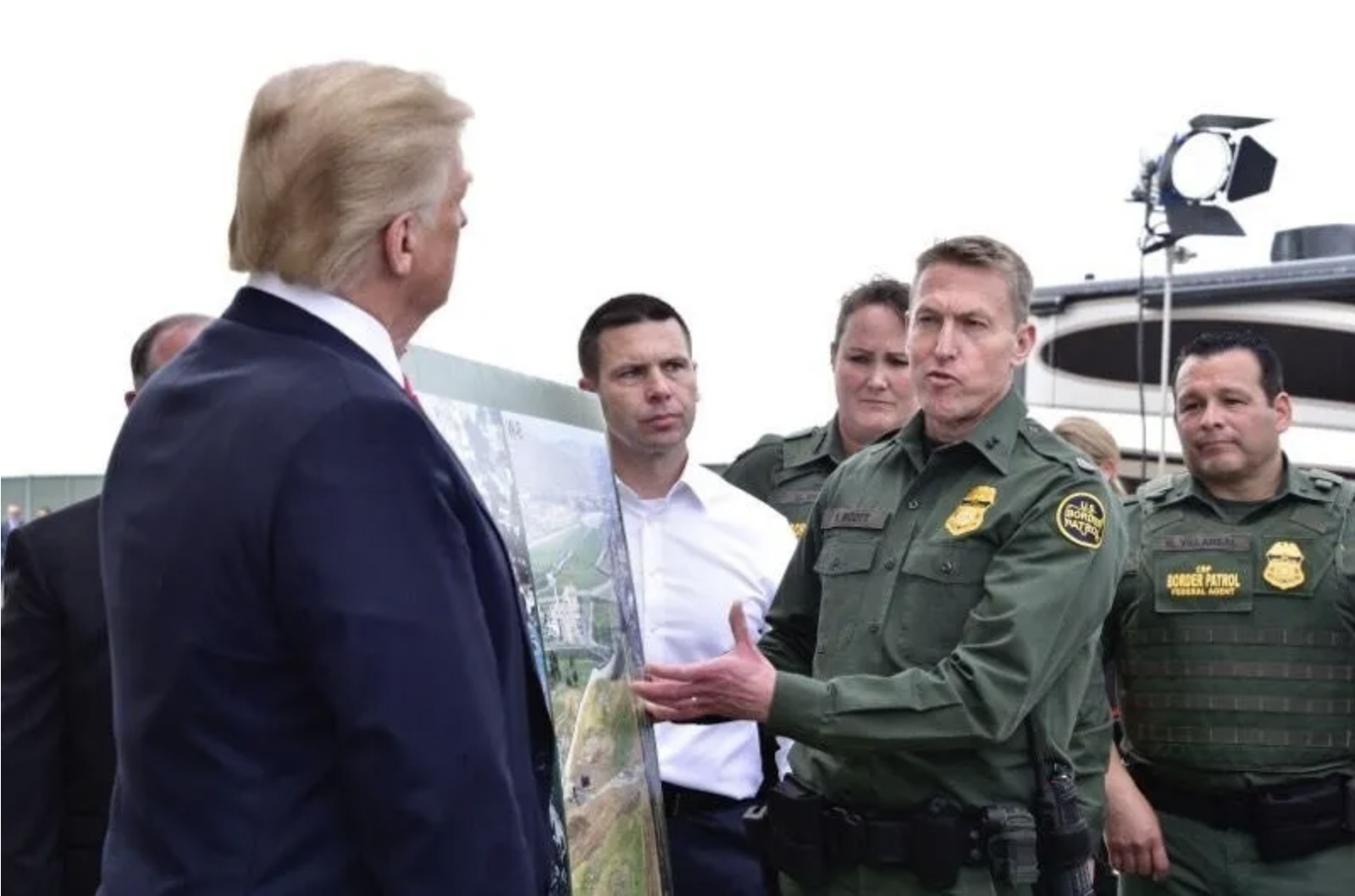
President Trump discusses border security with Acting Customs and Border Protection Commissioner Kevin McAleenan, Acting Border Patrol Chief Carla Provost, and San Diego Border Patrol Sector Chief Patrol Agent Rodney S. Scott during a visit to the border wall prototypes and mockups in Otay Mesa, California. (March 13, 2018)

On August 31, 2017, CBP announced the award of the "concrete" prototype contracts. On September 7, 2017, CBP announced the award of the "other materials" prototype contracts. On September 26, 2017, CBP announced the start of construction of eight prototype barriers made from concrete and other materials. Six vendors constructed the eight prototype barriers, with two companies building examples of both types ("concrete" and "other materials"): Caddell Construction Co. of Montgomery, Alabama; KWR Construction of Sierra Vista, Arizona; ELTA North America Inc. of Annapolis Junction, Maryland; W. G. Yates & Sons Construction Company of Philadelphia, Mississippi; Fisher Sand & Gravel Co. of Tempe, Arizona; and Texas Sterling Construction Co. of Houston, Texas. On March 13, 2018, President Trump visited the eight prototypes in Otay Mesa, California, accompanied by Homeland Security Secretary Kirstjen Nielsen, CBP Acting Commissioner Kevin McAleenan, Acting U.S. Border Patrol Chief Carla Provost and San Diego Section Chief Patrol Agent Rodney S. Scott.

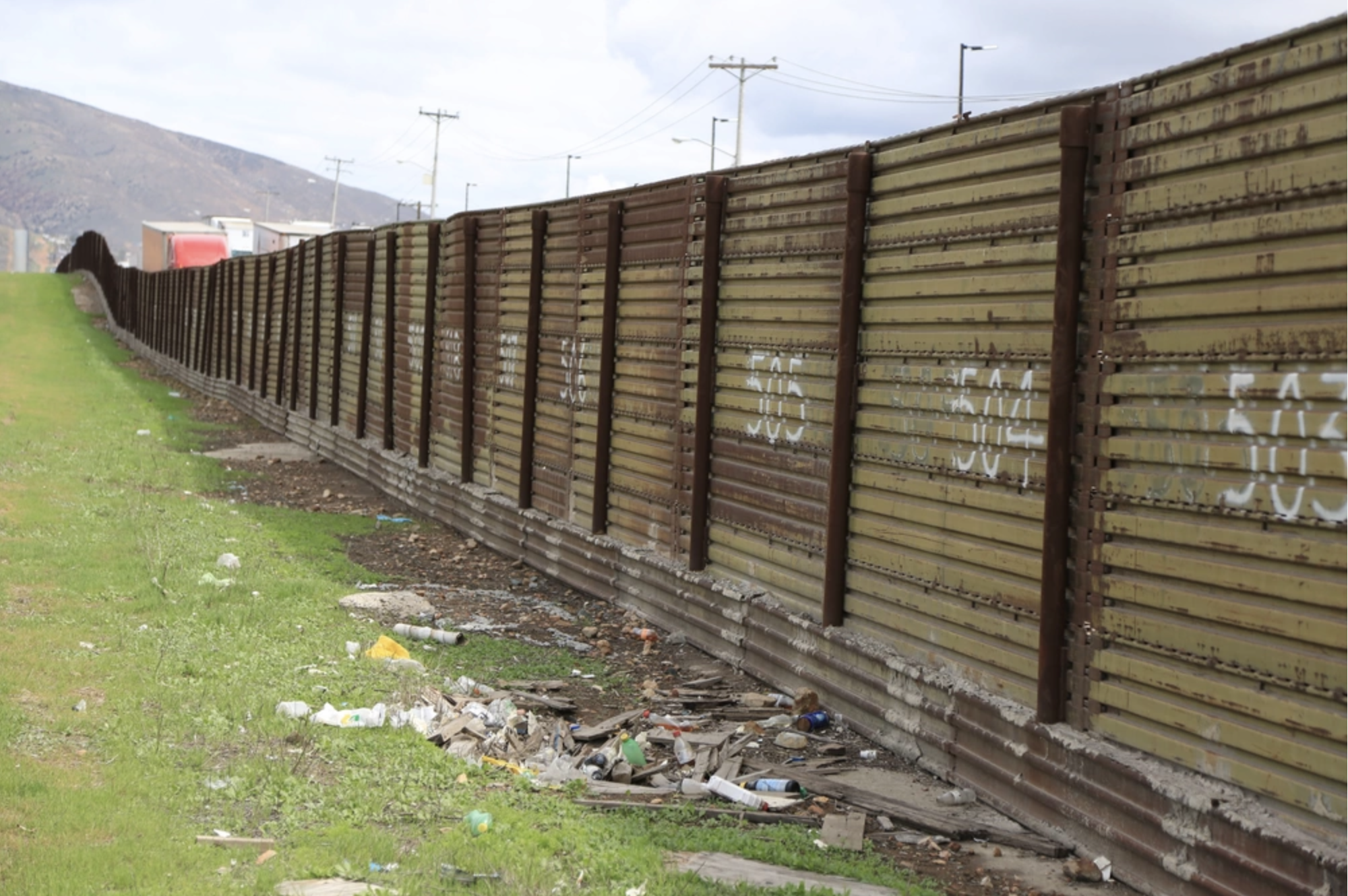
Vietnam-era Marston Mats were originally used to construct the primary pedestrian border barrier in San Diego's Border Infrastructure System. These panels were subsequently replaced by steel bollard wall (March 14, 2018).

Trump's campaign promise has faced a host of legal and logistical challenges since. In March 2018, the Trump administration secured $1.6 billion from Congress for projects at the border for existing designs of approximately 100 miles (160 km) of new and replacement walls.

On April 4, 2018, President Trump released a Presidential Memorandum for the Secretary of Defense, the Attorney General and the Secretary of Homeland Security instructing them to coordinate actions on the Southern Border to stop the flow of drugs, contraband, criminals and illegal aliens into the United States. The Memorandum also instructed the Department of Defense to mobilize the National Guard to support the Department of Homeland Security at the Border and to undertake planning to draw upon additional military resources through executive authorities. On April 5, 2018, the Department of Defense announced the establishment of a new "Border Security Support Cell" as a communications channel between Department of Defense and Department of Homeland Security on border-related issues led by Kenneth P. Rapuano, Assistant Secretary of Defense for Homeland Defense and Global Security.

On June 3, 2018, the San Diego section of wall construction began. On October 26, 2018, a two-mile (3.2 km) stretch of 30-foot steel bollards in Calexico, California, was commemorated as the first section of Trump's wall, although media coverage heavily debated whether it should be considered a "wall" or a "fence". A plaque was installed as part of the commemoration, which read: "This plaque was installed on October 26, 2018 to commemorate the completion of the first section of President Trump's border wall" and named the following officials: President Trump; Homeland Security Secretary Kirstjen Nielsen; CBP commissioner Kevin McAleenan; U.S. Border Patrol chief Carla Provost; and Chief Gloria Chavez, El Centro Sector. Trump visited this section of wall on April 5, 2019.

As part of budget negotiations over Fiscal Year 2019 Appropriations, the Administration submitted a supplemental request of $5.7 billion for "construction of a steel barrier for the Southwest border" to Senate Appropriations Committee chairman Richard Shelby. This funding request was the central issue for the partial government shut down from December 22, 2018, to January 25, 2019, due to President Trump's declared intention to veto any spending bill that did not include $5.7 billion in funding for a border wall.

The negotiated bipartisan funding agreement only provided $1.375 billion of the Administration's supplemental $5.7 billion request, and allowed for approximately 55 miles of construction in the Rio Grande Valley. On February 15, 2019, President Trump declared a National Emergency Concerning the Southern Border of the United States, which required the use of the armed forces and which authorized the use of Section 2808 of Title 10, U.S. Code. The Administration also released a fact sheet titled President Donald J. Trump's Border Security Victory which detailed additional executive actions to redirect $6.1 billion in Department of Defense funds comprising $2.5 billion in funds under non-emergency 10 U.S.C. §284 authority (Support for counterdrug activities and activities to counter transnational organized crime) and $3.6 billion in funds under emergency 10 U.S.C. §2808 authority (Construction authority in the event of a declaration of war or national emergency), as well as approximately $601 million from the Treasury Forfeiture Fund. As a result, the Administration was able to mobilize approximately $8.1 billion of available funding to support border wall construction.

On February 25, 2019, the Department of Homeland Security made a formal written request for the Department of Defense to support DHS' mission of impeding illegal entry and drug smuggling along the southern border by assisting with construction of new or replacement border infrastructure including fences, roads and lighting. The request asked the Department of Defense to fund 11 border wall projects on federal land. On March 25, 2019, the Department of Defense authorized the United States Army Corps of Engineers (USACE) to plan and execute up to $1 billion in support for Department of Homeland Security and Customs and Border Protection per the February 15, 2019 national emergency declaration on the southern border. This authorization supported the construction of 57 miles of 18-foot-high pedestrian fencing, road improvements/construction and lighting installation within the Yuma and El Paso Sectors of the southern border under 10 U.S.C. § 284(b)(7), which gives the Department of Defense the statutory authority to construct infrastructure to block drug-smuggling corridors across international boundaries of the United States in support of counter-narcotic missions of Federal law enforcement agencies. The Department of Defense utilized transfer authority in Section 8005 of the Fiscal Year 2019 DOD Appropriations Act to shift $1 billion of Army personnel funds into DOD's Drug Interdiction Account to assist DHS with border wall construction. On May 9, 2019, the Department of Defense utilized Section 8005 in combination with transfer authority from Section 9002 of the Fiscal Year 2019 DOD Appropriations Act, to shift an additional $1.5 billion of funds into the Drug Interdiction Account to support border wall construction. For each construction project under 10 U.S.C. § 284, the acting secretary of homeland security invoked waiver authority under § 102 of the Illegal Immigration Reform and Immigrant Responsibility Act (IIRIRA) for several environmental, conservation and historic preservation statutes including: National Environmental Policy Act (NEPA); Endangered Species Act; Safe Drinking Water Act; and Antiquities Act. On May 23, 2019, United States Customs and Border Protection reported that a total of approximately 205 miles of new and updated border barriers had been funded since January 2017 through traditional appropriations (Fiscal Year 2017–2019) and Treasury Forfeiture Funding, of which approximately 42 miles had been completed to date. CBP also reported that the combined $2.5 billion of Department of Defense funding for Fiscal Year 2019 under 10 U.S.C. § 284 would support the construction of up to approximately 131 miles of new border barriers to replace dilapidated or outdated designs, in addition to road construction and lighting installation, in the Yuma, El Paso, El Centro and Tucson Sectors.

On May 24, 2019, Judge Haywood Gilliam in the United States District Court for the Northern District of California issued decisions in two pending cases: Sierra Club v. Trump; California v. Trump . The Court held that Sections 8005 and 9002 of the Fiscal Year 2019 Department of Defense Appropriations Act did not authorize the transfer of funds for border barrier construction. The Judge granted a preliminary injunction in Sierra Club v. Trump, which prevented the Trump administration from redirecting funds under the national emergency declaration issued earlier in the year to fund a planned wall along the border with Mexico. Since the timing of plaintiff's lawsuit preceded the Department of Defense's May 9, 2019 transfer of $1.5 billion to the Drug Interdiction Account, the preliminary injunction the Court granted only applied to the initial (February 25, 2019) transfer of $1 billion to fund border projects in New Mexico and Arizona. The Judge declined to issue a preliminary injunction in California v. Trump. On June 28, 2019, Judge Gilliam issued a subsequent decision which also blocked the Department of Defense's May 9, 2019 transfer of $1.5 billion in funding for border projects near El Centro, California and Tucson, Arizona utilizing the same basis that Section 8005 and Section 9002 of the Fiscal Year 2019 Department of Defense Appropriations Act did not authorize the transfer of funds for border barrier construction. At the same time, the Court issued a permanent injunction prohibiting the reallocation of the combined $2.5 billion of funds transferred by the Department of Defense for the construction of border wall segments categorized as high priority by the Trump administration (spanning across California, Arizona and New Mexico). The decision was upheld five days later by a majority in the United States Court of Appeals for the Ninth Circuit but was subsequently overturned by the Supreme Court of the United States on July 26, 2019. On September 3, 2019, Secretary of Defense Mark Esper authorized the use of $3.6 billion in military construction funding for 175 miles (282 km) of border barrier. The House and Senate have twice voted to terminate Trump's emergency declaration, but the president vetoed both resolutions. In October 2019, a lawsuit filed in El Paso County produced a ruling that the emergency declaration was unlawful, as it failed to meet the National Emergencies Act's definition of an emergency. On December 10, 2019, a federal judge in the case blocked the use of the funding, but on January 8, 2020, a federal appeals court granted a stay of the ruling, freeing $3.6 billion for the wall.

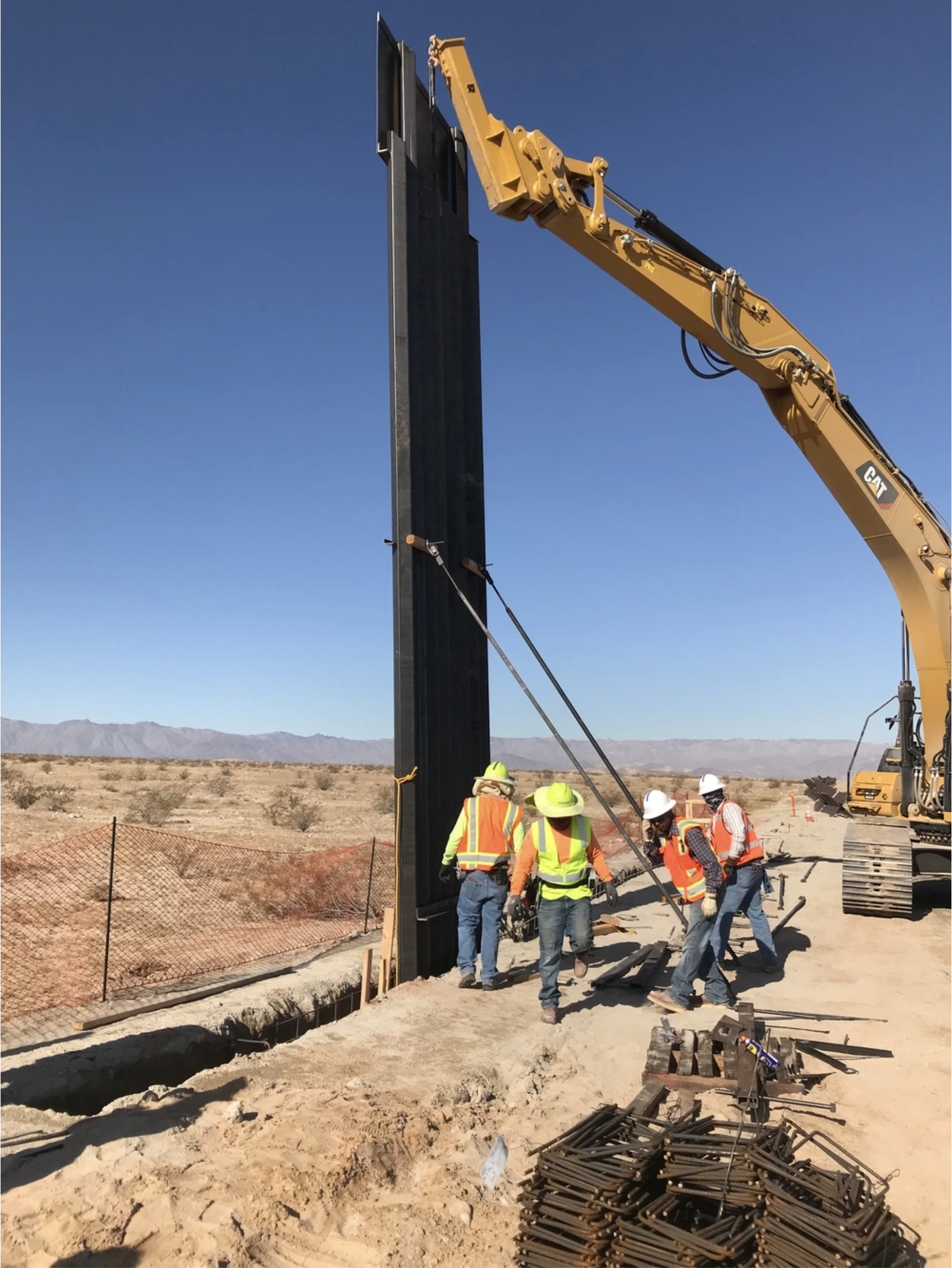
United States Army Corps of Engineers install the El Centro project first panel near Calexico, California. The border barrier project spans approximately 15 miles, replacing existing barrier with steel bollard barriers (August 22, 2019).

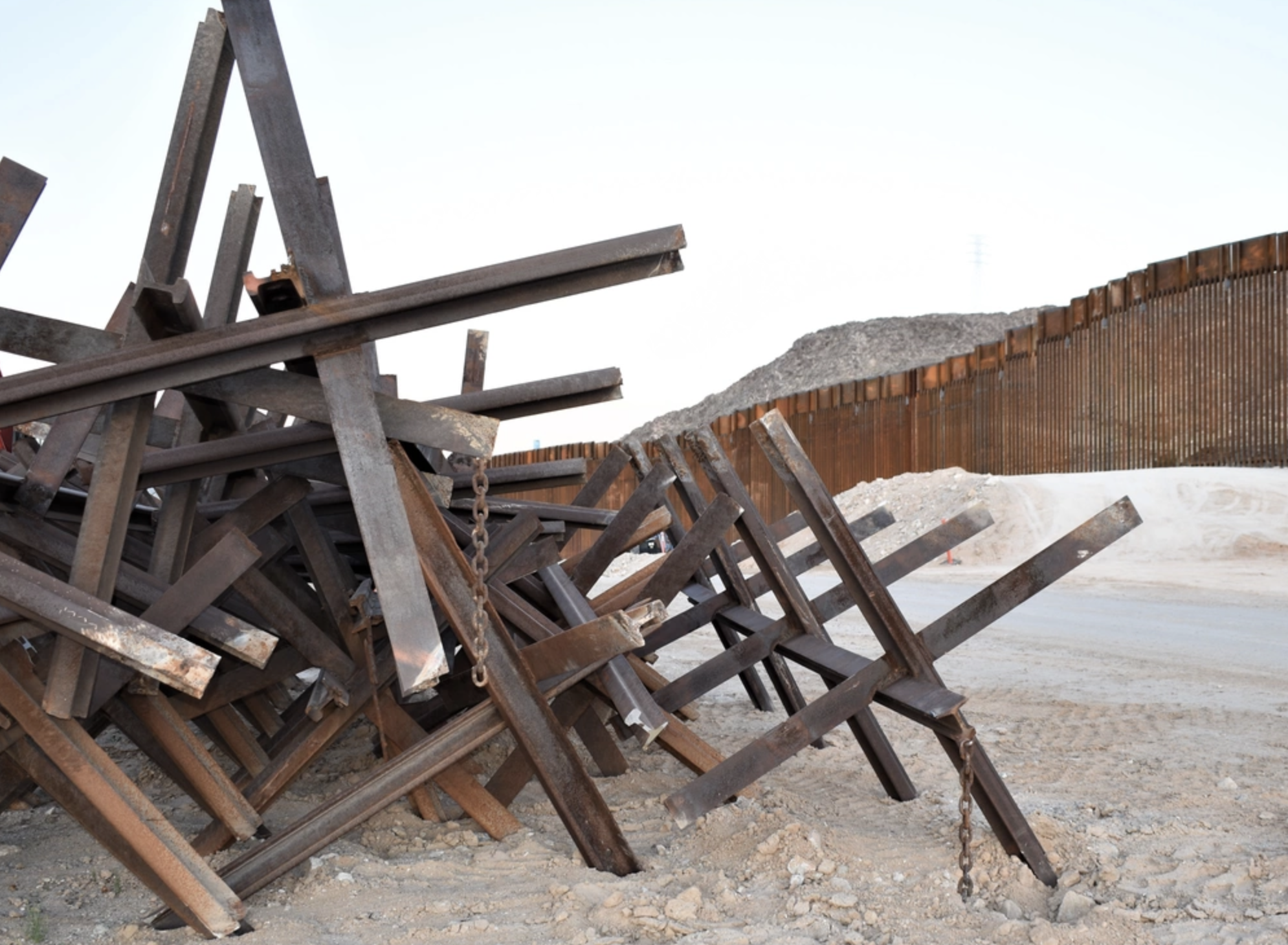
United States Army Corps of Engineers South Pacific Border District contractor crews remove outdated vehicle barrier at the El Centro 1 border barrier project near El Centro, California (April 30, 2020).

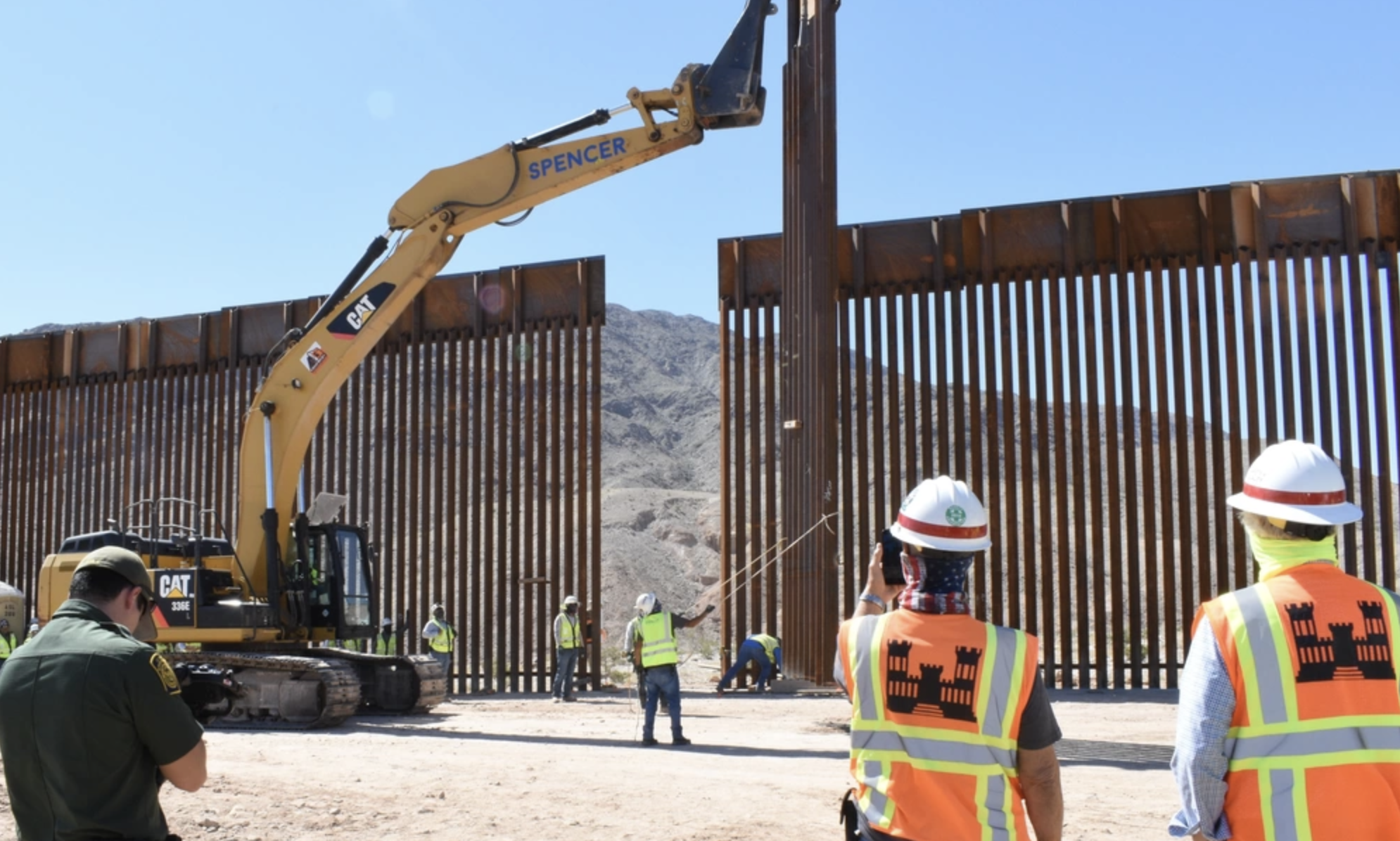
United States Army Corps of Engineers South Pacific Border District contractors lift the El Centro 1 border barrier project's final panel near El Centro, California (May 1, 2020).

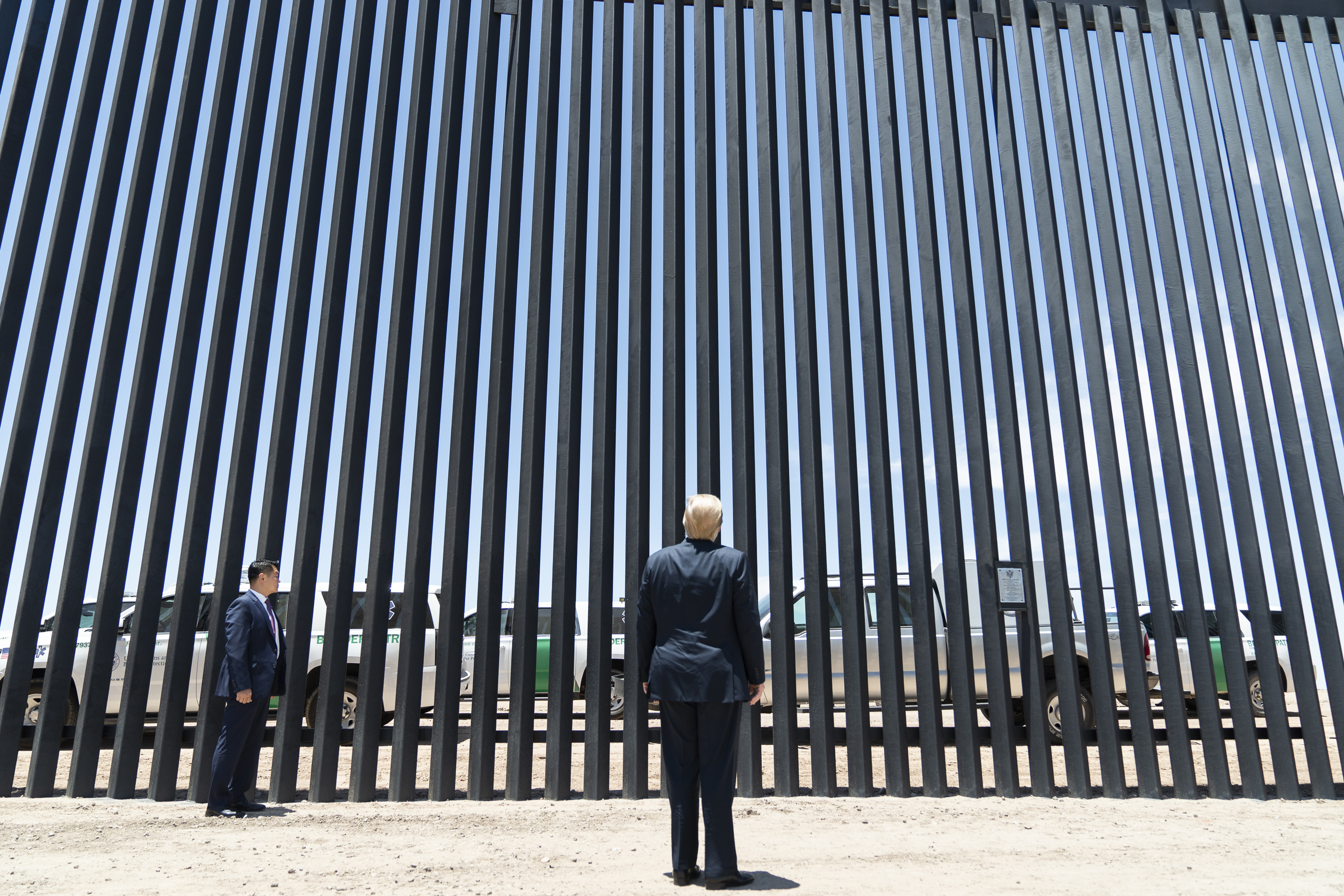
President Donald Trump with a section of the border wall near Yuma, Arizona, June 2020

As of August 2019, the Trump administration's barrier construction had been limited to replacing sections that needed repair or were outdated, with 60 miles (97 km) of replacement wall built in the Southwest since 2017. On August 22, 2019, the first border panel was installed for the El Centro Border Project near Calexico, California, replacing existing barrier with steel bollard barriers. As of September 12, 2019, the Trump administration had announced plans for "Between 450 and 500 miles (724–806 kilometers) of fencing along the nearly 2,000-mile (3,218-kilometer) border by the end of 2020" with an estimated total cost of $18.4 billion. Privately owned land adjacent to the border would have to be acquired by the U.S. government to be built upon.

On May 1, 2020, the United States Army Corps of Engineers completed the El Centro 1 Border Barrier Project. Work also continued on the: Yuma 1 Project; Yuma 2 Project; Yuma 3 Project; Yuma 10/27 Project; Yuma 23 Project; Tucson 3 Project; Tucson 9 Project; Tucson 10-28 Project; El Paso 5 Project; San Diego 4 Project; San Diego 15 Project; San Diego Secondary Project. These projects were executed as directed through the United States Army by the secretary of defense, in response to President Trump's National Emergency Concerning the Southern Border of the United States dated February 15, 2019, which required the use of the armed forces and which authorized the use of Section 2808 of Title 10, U.S. Code.

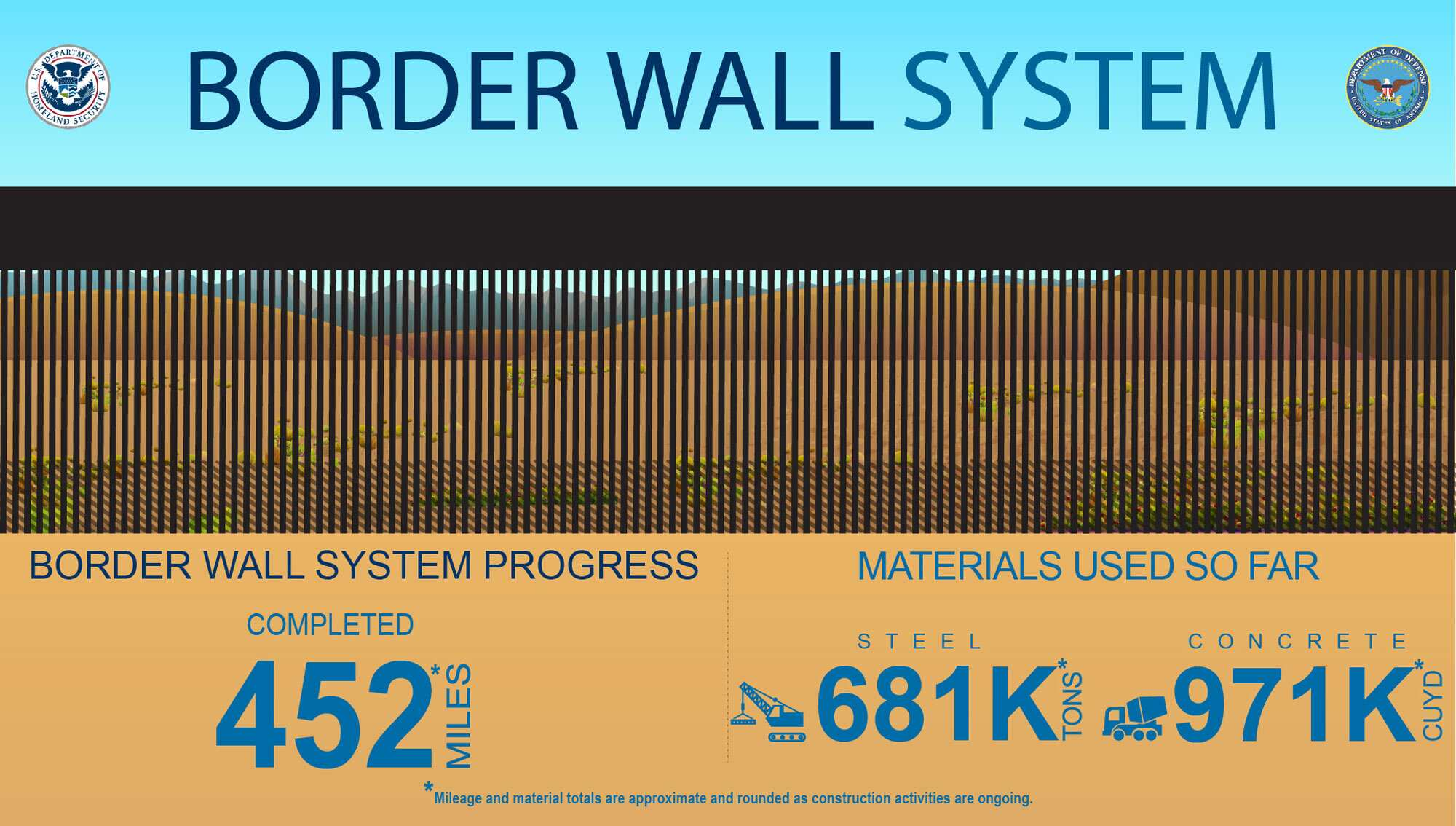
United States Customs and Border Protection Infographic of Border Wall System Construction Progress (January 20, 2021).

On June 23, 2020, Trump visited Yuma, Arizona, for a campaign rally commemorating the completion of 200 miles (320 km) of the wall. U.S. Customs and Border Protection confirmed that almost all of this was replacement fencing.

On October 19, 2020, the Supreme Court of the United States agreed to hear the Trump Administration's challenge to the Ninth Circuit's holding in Trump v. Sierra Club that it violated the appropriations clause of the United States Constitution by diverting $2.5 billion from the Pentagon to pay for the wall. The case was scheduled for oral argument in February 2021. In total, the Trump Administration identified $15 billion, from a combination of the Pentagon (Military Construction Accounts under Section 2808 and Counternarcotics/Drug Interdiction Funds under Section 284), Department of Homeland Security/Congress appropriations and the Department of the Treasury's Treasury Forfeiture Fund, to construct 738 miles of border wall.

CBP reported as of January 19, 2021 that ~458 miles (737 km) of new primary and secondary border wall had been constructed, both in place of dilapidated and outdated designs and in locations where no barriers previously existed, in the United States Border Patrol's (USBP) San Diego, El Centro, Yuma, Tucson, El Paso, Del Rio, and Rio Grande Valley (RGV) Sectors. ~206 miles of new primary and secondary border wall remained under contract, in place of dilapidated and outdated designs and in locations where no barriers previously existed, in USBP's San Diego, El Centro, Yuma, Tucson, El Paso, Del Rio, Laredo and Rio Grade Valley (RGV) Sectors. ~74 miles of new primary and secondary border wall remained in the pre-construction phase and had not yet been awarded, in locations where no barriers currently existed, primarlily in USBP's San Diego, El Centro, El Paso and Laredo Sectors.

Breakdown of Mileage (As of January 19, 2021):
New Primary Wall	New Secondary Wall	New Primary Wall	New Secondary Wall	Total
In place of dilapidated and/or outdated designs.		In locations where no barriers previously existed.		Total
~375 miles	~25 miles	~281 miles	~57 miles	~738 miles FUNDED
~351 miles	~22 miles	~52 miles	~33 miles	~458 miles COMPLETED

==== Contractors and independent efforts ====
As of February 2019, contractors were preparing to construct $600 million worth of replacement barriers along the south Texas Rio Grande Valley section of the border wall, approved by Congress in March 2018. In mid-April 2019, former Kansas secretary of state Kris Kobach visited Coolidge, Arizona, to observe a demonstration by North Dakota's Fisher Industries of how it would build a border fence. The company maintained that it could erect 218 miles (351 km) of the barrier for $3.3 billion and be able to complete it in 13 months. Spin cameras positioned atop the fence would use facial-recognition technology, and underground fiber optic cables could detect and differentiate between human activity, vehicles, tunneling, and animals as distant as 40 feet (12 m) away. The proposed barrier would be constructed with 42 miles (68 km) near Yuma and 91 miles (146 km) near Tucson, Arizona, 69 miles (111 km) near El Paso, Texas, and 15 miles (24 km) near El Centro, California—reportedly costing $12.5 million per mile ($7.8 million per kilometer). In April 2019, U.S. senator Bill Cassidy said that he traveled with the group of politicians and administration officials over the Easter recess to Coolidge (120 miles (190 km) north of the Mexico border) because he felt that insufficient barrier and border enhancements had been erected since Trump became president. U.S. senator Kevin Cramer was also there, promoting Fisher Industries, which demonstrated the construction of a 56-foot (17 m) fence in Coolidge.

A private organization founded by military veteran Brian Kolfage called "We Build the Wall" raised over $20 million beginning in 2018, with President Trump's encouragement and with leadership from Kobach and Steve Bannon. Over the 2019 Memorial Day weekend, the organization constructed a 0.5-mile (0.80 km) to 1-mile (1.6 km) "weathered steel" bollard fence near El Paso on private land adjoining the U.S.–Mexico border using $6–8 million of the donated funds. Kolfage's organization says it has plans to construct further barriers on private lands adjoining the border in Texas and California. On December 3, 2019, a Hidalgo County judge ordered the group to temporarily halt all construction because of its plans to build adjacent to the Rio Grande, which a lawyer for the National Butterfly Center argues would create a flooding risk. On January 9, 2020, a federal judge lifted an injunction, allowing a construction firm to move forward with the 3-mile (4.8 km) project along the Rio Grande. This ended a month long court battle with both the Federal Government and the National Butterfly Center which both tried to block construction efforts. By August 2020, the portions constructed by the organization were already in serious danger of collapsing due to erosion, and the acting U.S. attorney for the Southern District of New York unsealed an indictment charging four people, including Bannon, with a scheme to defraud hundreds of thousands of donors by illegally taking funds intended to finance construction for personal use. An unpublished memo from the U.S. Customs and Border Protection leaked in March 2022 revealed that the wall had been breached more than 3,200 times from October 2018 to September 2021. Nonetheless, CBP officials say the bollard fencing remains a valuable border security tool when combined with surveillance technology and sufficient personnel.

==== Outcome ====
As of December 2020, the total funding given for new fencing was about $15 billion (~$18.4 billion in 2025), a third of which had been given by Congress while Trump had ordered the rest taken from the military budget. This funding was intended to build new fencing over 738 miles (1,188 km), at a cost of about $20 million per mile ($12.5 million per kilometer); this would cover a little more than half the approximately 1,300 miles (2,100 km) that had no fencing when Trump took office.

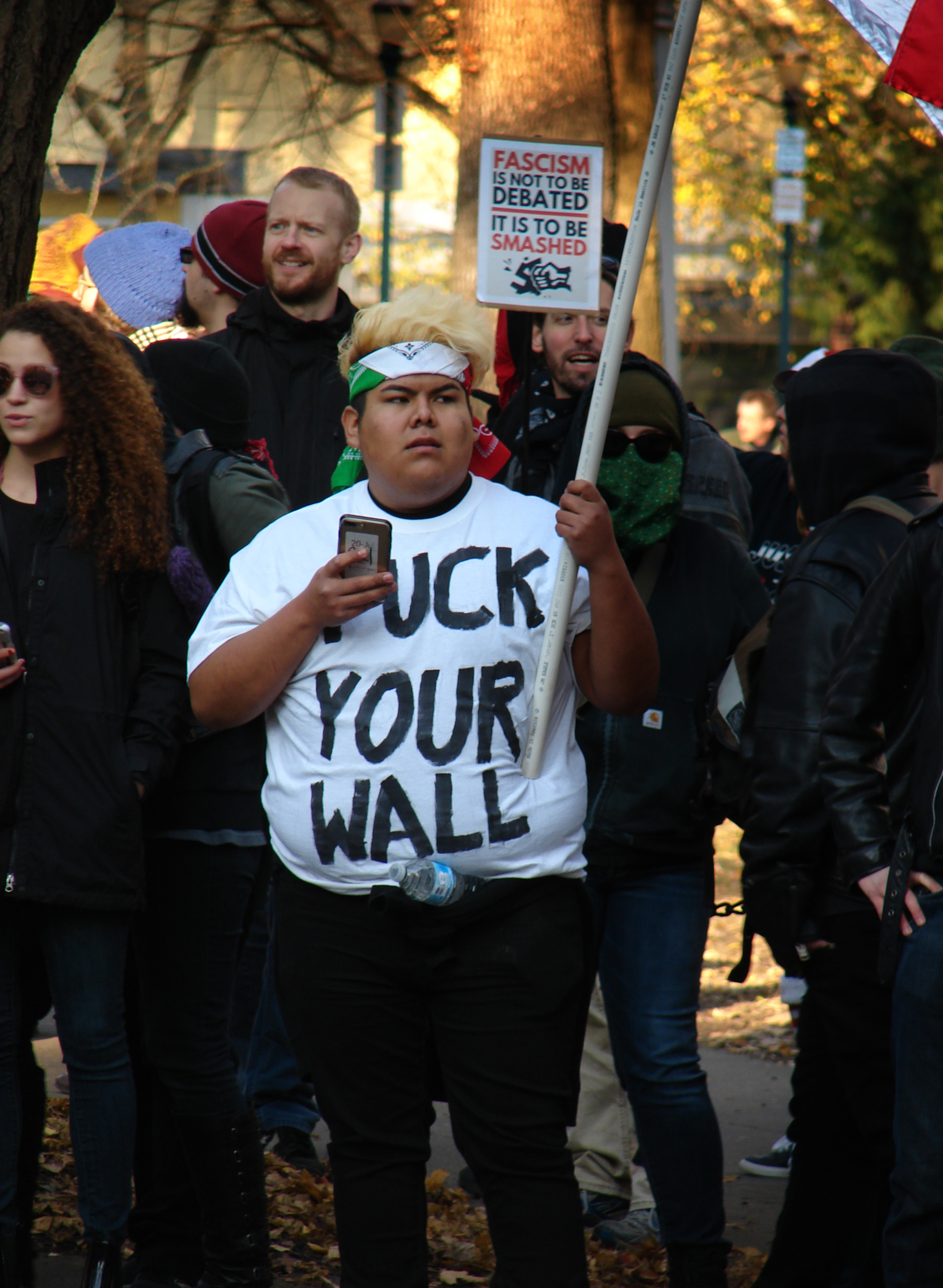
Protests against the US–Mexico border wall.

A March 2021 review of the Trump work on the wall found only 47 miles (76 km) of new barriers where none had previously existed. While Trump had described the new wall as "virtually impenetrable", it was found that smugglers had repeatedly sawed through the wall with cheap power tools. Also, new dirt roads that had been used to access the wall construction served as new access roads for smugglers.

=== Biden administration (2021–2025) ===
President Joe Biden signed an executive order on his first day of office, January 20, 2021, ordering a "pause" in all construction of the wall no later than January 27. The government was given two months to plan how to spend the funds elsewhere and determine how much it would cost to terminate the contracts. There were no plans to tear down parts of the wall that had been built. The deployment of 3,000 National Guard troops along the border continued.

On February 3, 2021, the Supreme Court of the United States granted the government's motion to hold further briefing on Biden v. Sierra Club (Previously captioned as Trump v. Sierra Club) in abeyance and removed the case from its February 2021 argument calendar.

The Biden administration continued to seize land for construction of the border wall. By December 2021, many contracts had been cancelled, including one requiring the possession of the land of a family represented by the Texas Civil Rights Project.

On March 12, 2021, it was reported that migrants and cartels began using construction roads for incomplete border wall projects as walking paths for entry and smuggling across the border.

On June 11, 2021, the Department of Homeland Security released its plan for the use of border barrier funds from the prior Administration. This plan was designed to end wall expansion and address life, safety and environmental concerns. The plan would return remaining, unobligated funds to their original sources and prioritize remaining funds for clean-up of construction sites to address drainage, erosion control, site remediation, material disposal and environmental damage remediation. This work continued over the following months and years through conversations with stakeholders across multiple border sectors.

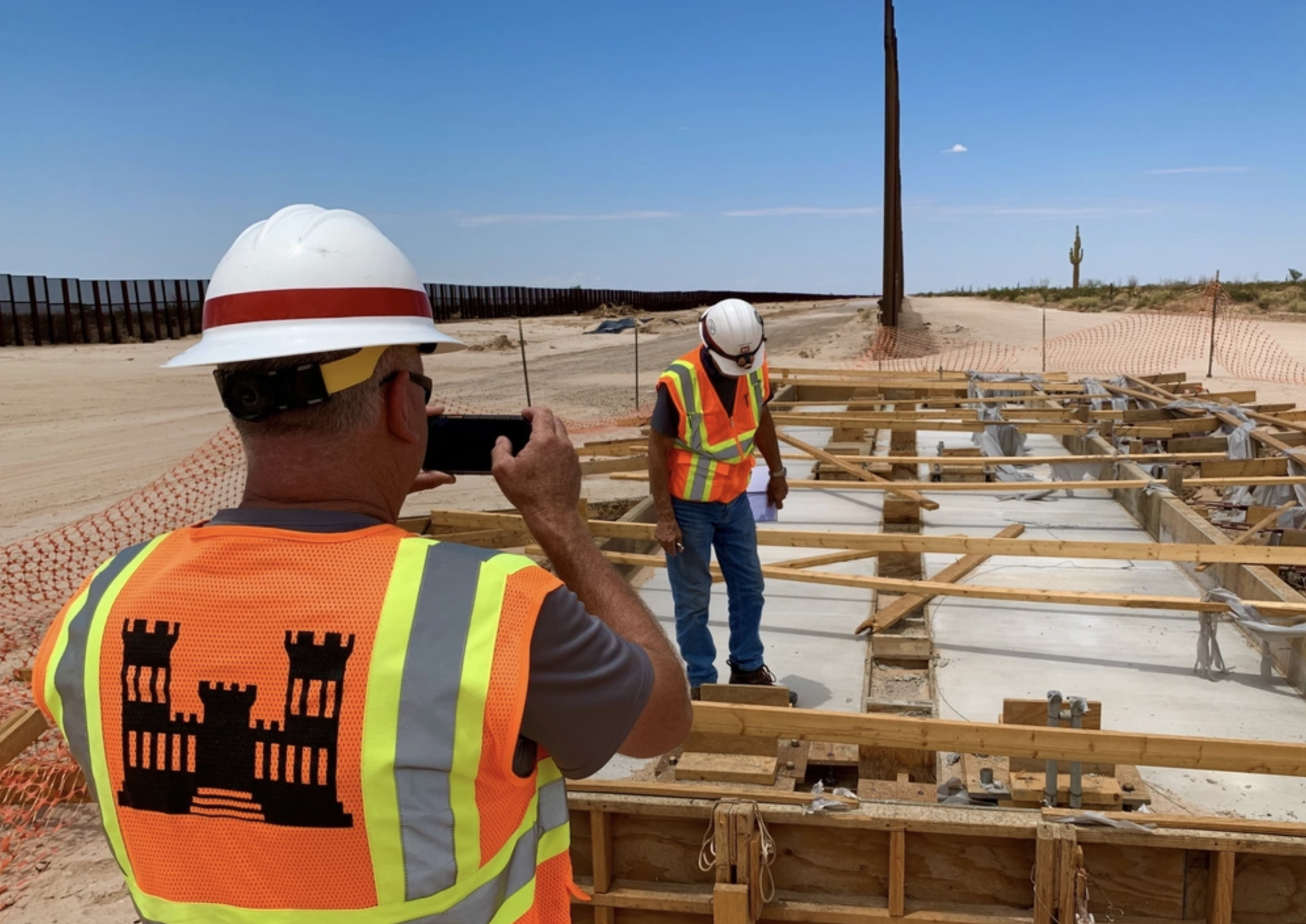
United States Army Corps of Engineers South Pacific Border District employees document an unfinished gate structure before work begins at the Yuma 10/27 former wall construction site near Yuma, Arizona (July 19, 2021).

In June 2021, Texas governor Greg Abbott announced plans to build a border wall in his state, saying that the state would provide $250 million and that direct donations from the public would be solicited. On June 29, the Republican Study Committee organized a group of two dozen Republican House members to visit a gap in the border where Central Americans were crossing into the country. Representative Mary Miller (R-IL) stated that "obviously our president has advertised this and facilitated this invasion". Rep. Jim Banks (R-IN) praised the effectiveness of Trump's wall and said that because of the halted construction, "thousands of migrants [pass] through this area regularly... because there's an open door that allows them to do that". In reference to wristbands on migrants used by Mexican cartels and smugglers to track them, Rep. Madison Cawthorn (R-NC) stated, "They're basically treating people like Amazon products. ... There is no care that that is a human being, someone who has a soul, someone who has unalienable rights that predate any government."

On July 2, 2021, the Supreme Court of the United States vacated the Ninth Circuit's ruling in Biden v. Sierra Club and remanded the case given the change in administration and circumstances.

In July 2021, the United States Army Corps of Engineers began "Make Safe" work on incomplete border wall projects such as: Yuma 10/27; Tucson 9; Tucson 3. This work did not involve expanding the border barrier, but it included removing construction debris, filling open trenches, cutting and capping conduit, making gate foundations safe, making maintenance roads safe, and grading around handholds and manholes. Final inspections of the "Make Safe" work at these project sites was conducted in conjunction with United States Customs and Border Protection.

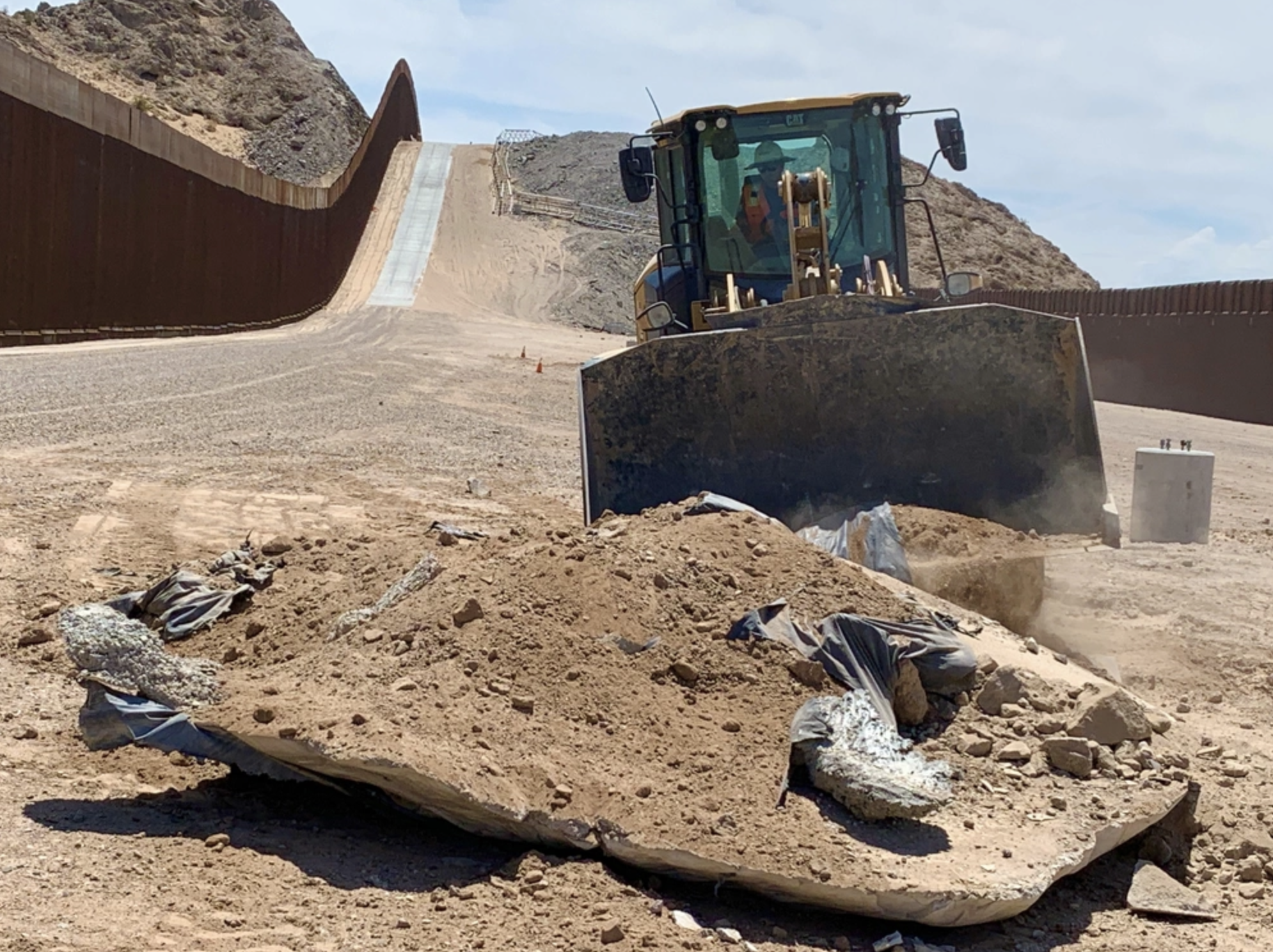
A United States Army Corps of Engineers South Pacific Border District contractor removes construction debris at the Yuma 10/27 former wall construction site near Yuma, Arizona (July 19, 2021).

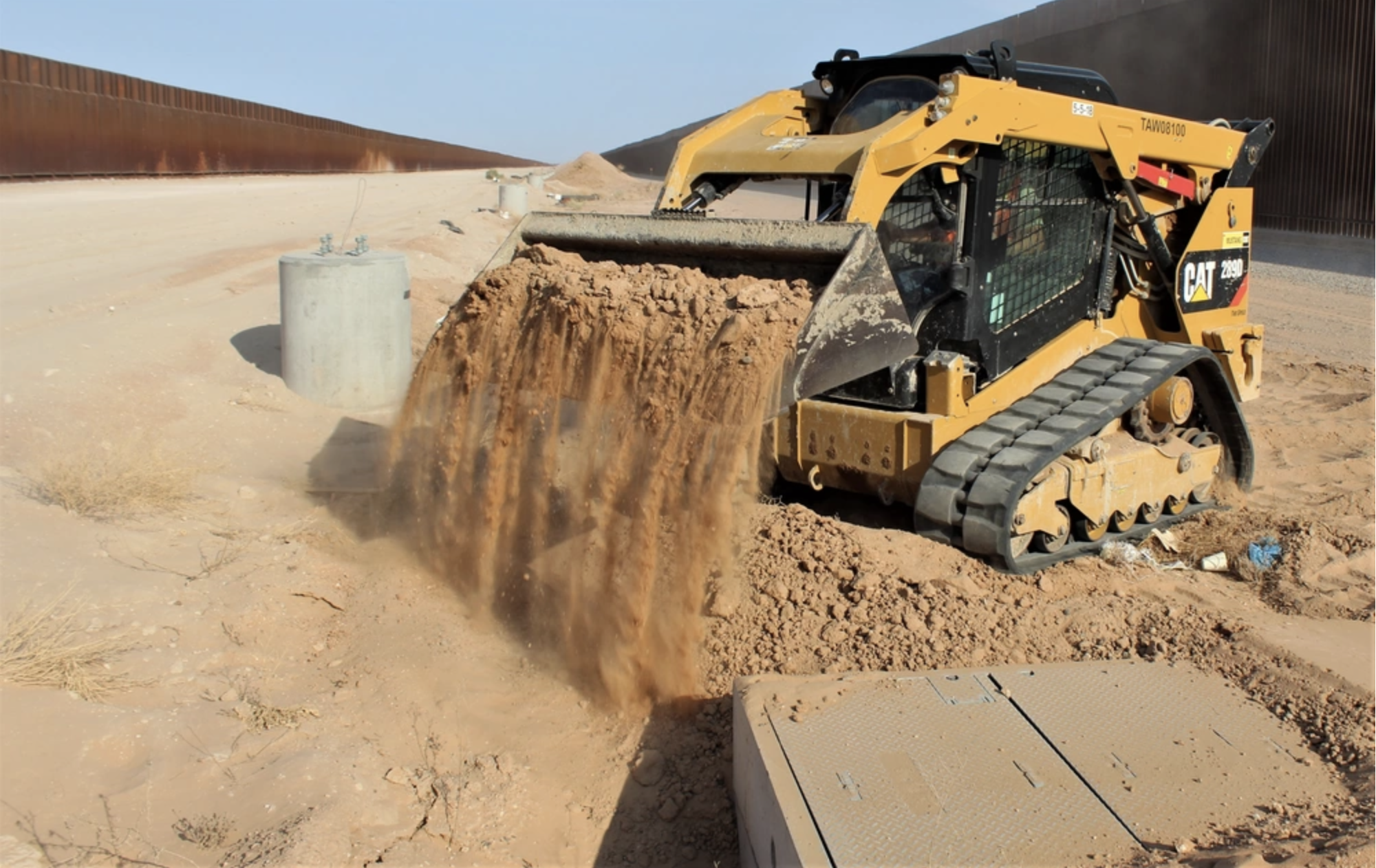
A United States Army Corps of Engineers South Pacific Border District contractor fills an open trench at the Yuma 10/27 former wall construction site near Yuma, Arizona (July 21, 2021).

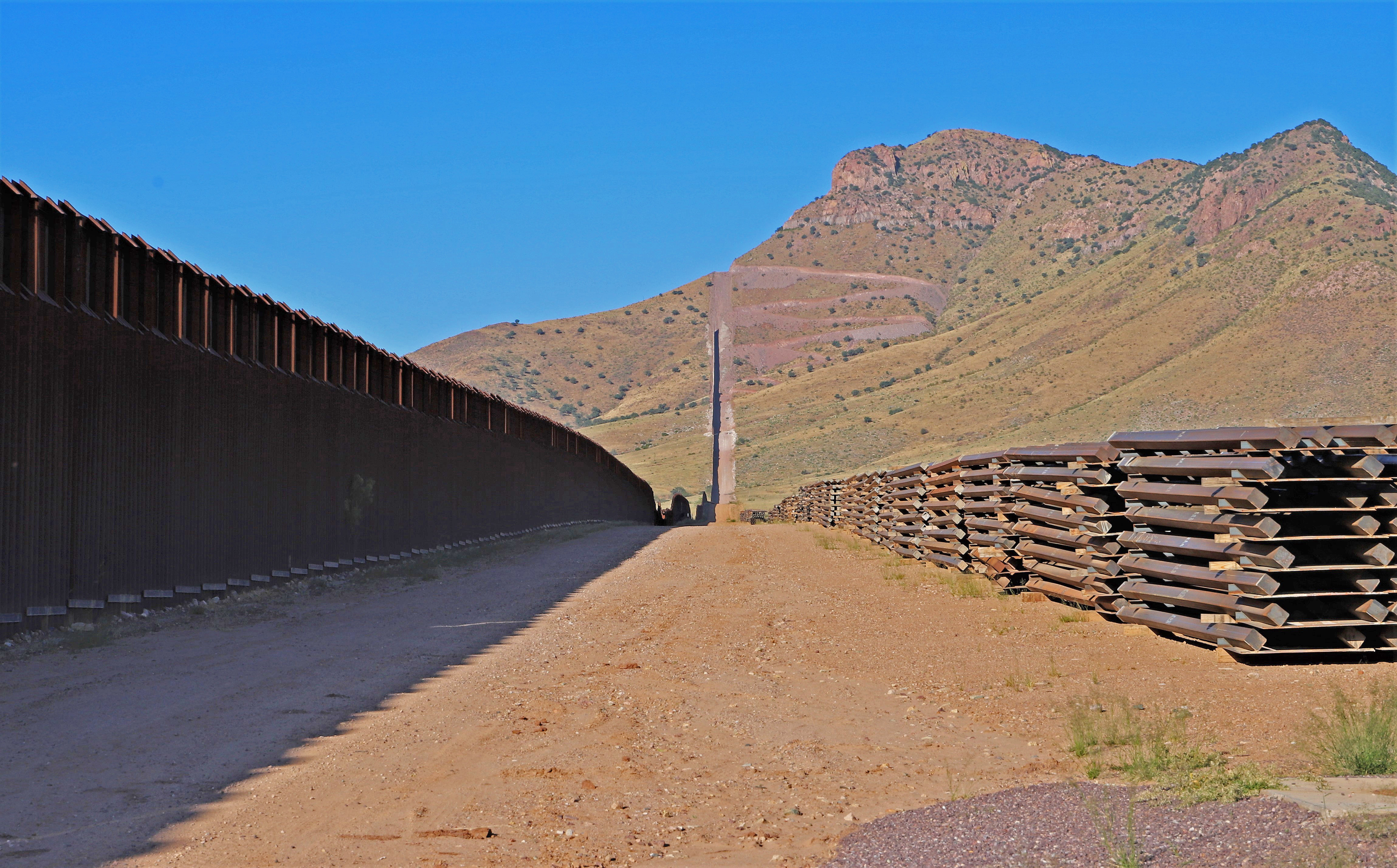
United States Army Corps of Engineers South Pacific Border District and United States Customs and Border Protection conduct final inspections to ensure incomplete construction sites are secured and made safe at the Tucson 3 former barrier construction project near Naco, Arizona (October 14, 2021).

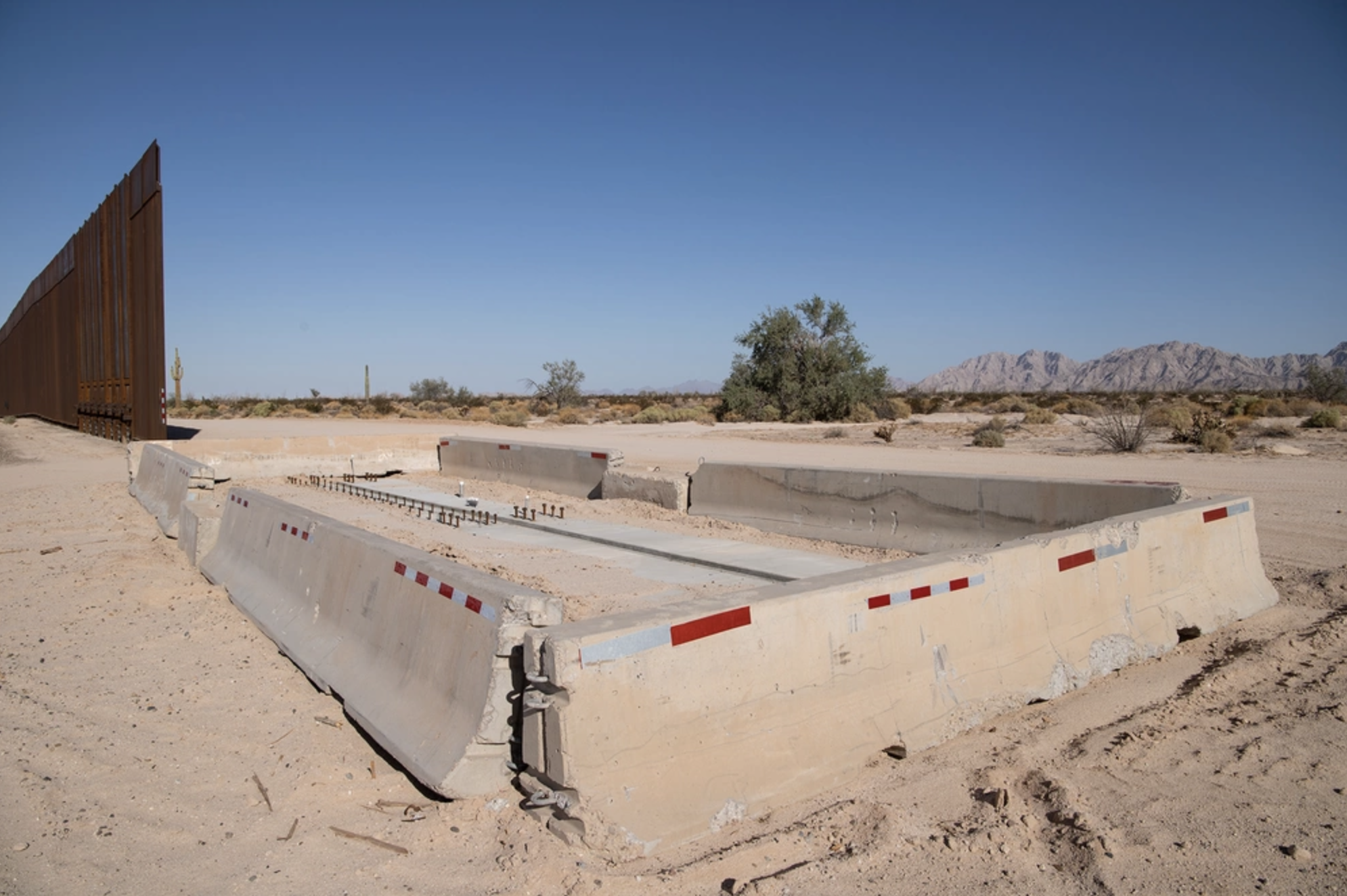
United States Army Corps of Engineers South Pacific Border District and United States Customs and Border Protection conduct final inspections to ensure incomplete construction sites are secured and made safe at the Yuma 10/27 former barrier construction project near Yuma, Arizona (October 19, 2021).

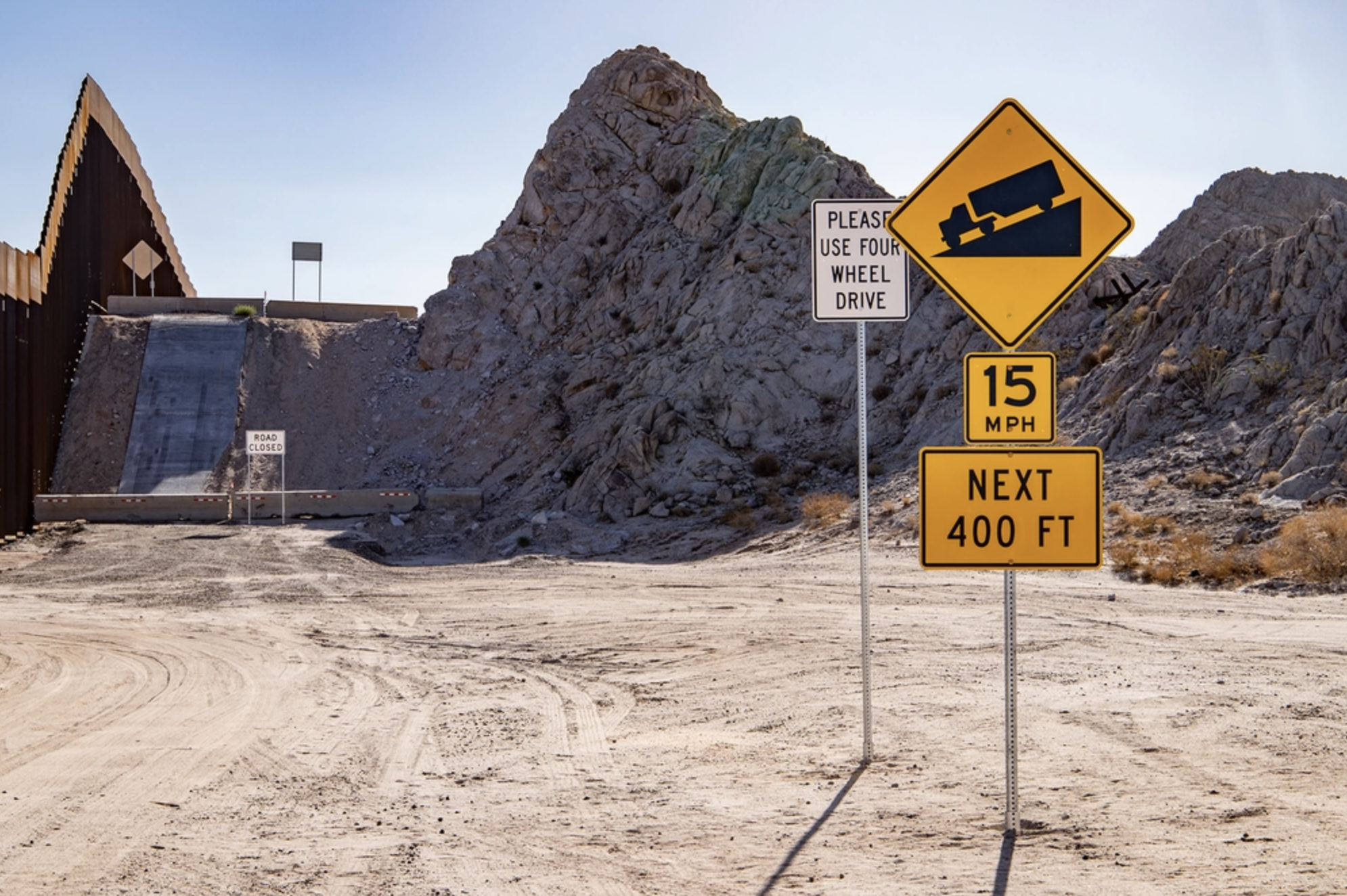
United States Army Corps of Engineers South Pacific Border District and United States Customs and Border Protection conduct final inspections to ensure incomplete construction sites are secured and made safe at the Yuma 10/27 former barrier construction project near Yuma, Arizona (October 19, 2021).

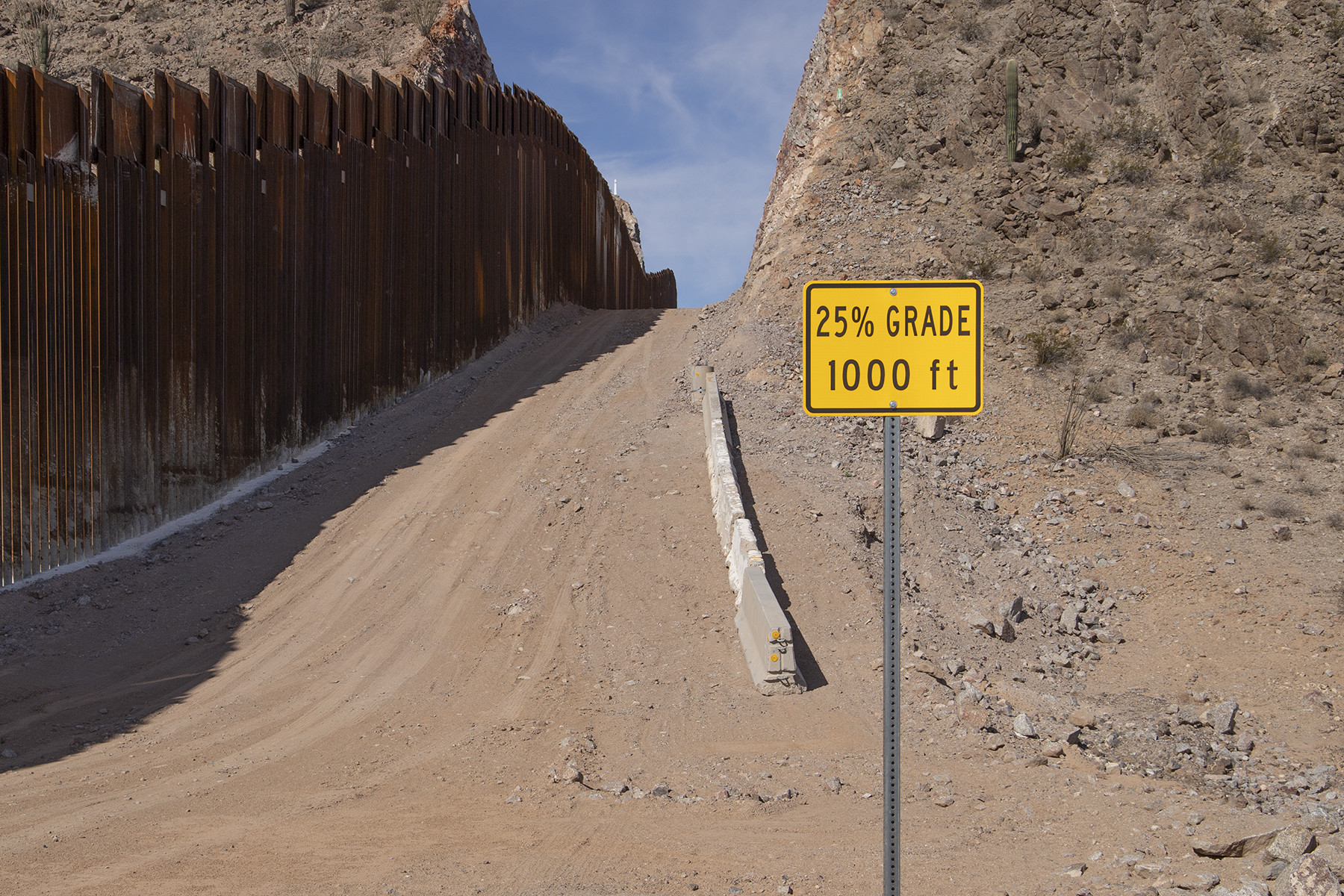
United States Army Corps of Engineers South Pacific Border District and United States Customs and Border Protection conduct final inspections to ensure incomplete construction sites are secured and made safe at the Yuma 10/27 former barrier construction project near Yuma, Arizona (October 20, 2021).

On July 21, 2021, Senator James Lankford, the lead Republican on the Senate Homeland Security and Governmental Affairs Committee on Government Operations and Border Management released a report which examined the cost of the Biden Administration's termination of wall construction. The report claimed that of the $10 billion in funding that DOD contractors had received in January 2021, $2 billion had been spent on now-idle worksites. According to the report, for the time period immediately after President Biden signed Presidential Proclamation 10142 which halted wall construction, DOD contractors were being paid $6 million per day to remain idle. At the time of its release, the report claimed that taxpayers were paying contractors on 7 project sites $3 million per day to remain idle.

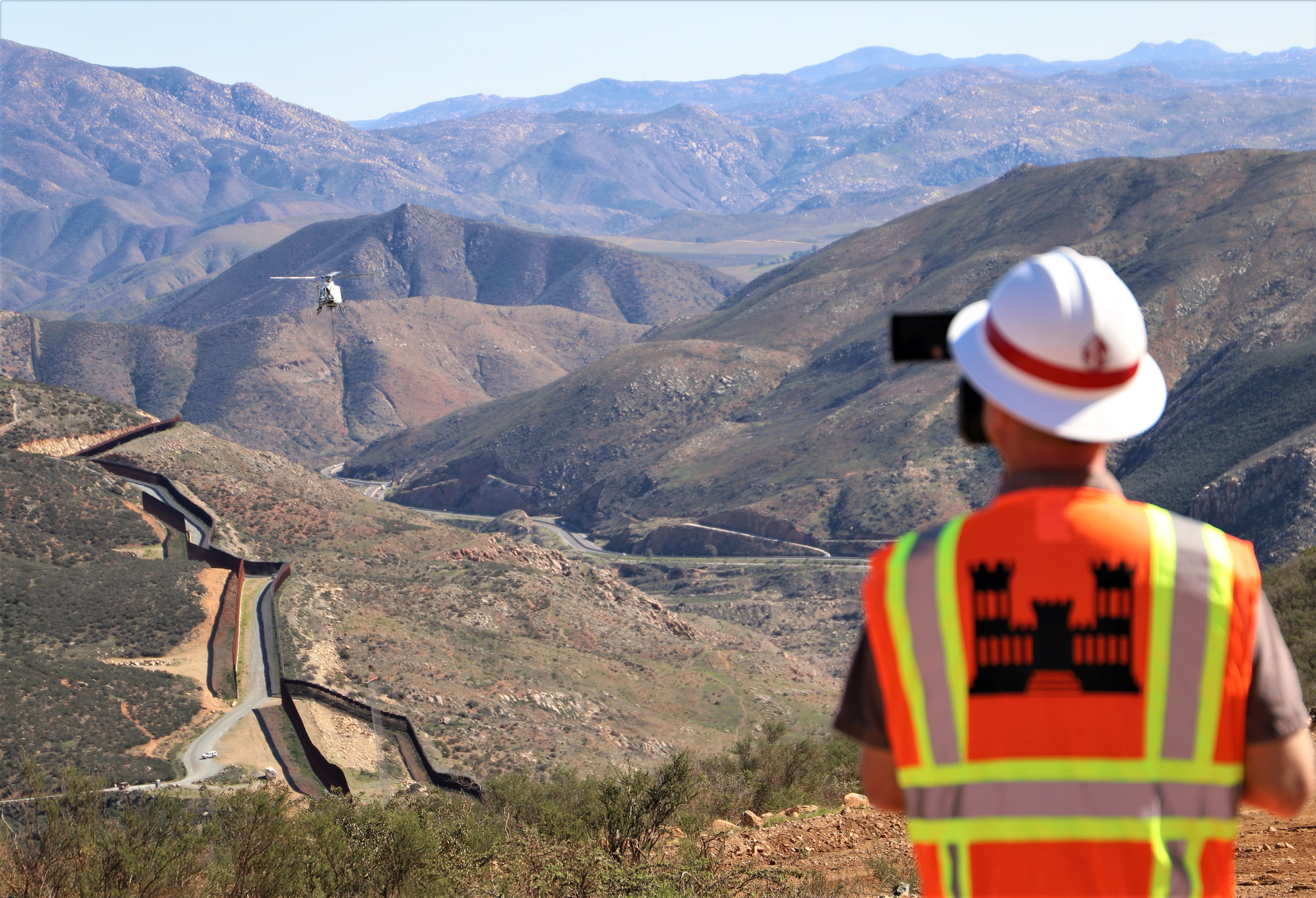
United States Army Corps of Engineers South Pacific Border District employees monitor airlift operations during make safe work at the San Diego 4 former DoD-funded border barrier construction site near San Diego, California (February 9, 2022).

On September 2, 2021, it was reported that unfinished flood gates along the incomplete border barrier in the Tucson Sector were damaged by storm debris during monsoon season. This damage was attributable to the lack of additional design features to slow or stop debris that were not installed and completed before work was paused by the Biden Administration's Presidential Proclamation.

On December 18, 2021, the Texas Facilities Commission installed the first border wall panel on state-owned land for its Texas Border Infrastructure Program. Texas continued building border wall during the rest of the Biden administration.

In January 2022, the United States Army Corps of Engineers transferred excess border barrier material to New River, Arizona for delivery to Davis–Monthan Air Force Base.

On July 28, 2022, the Biden administration announced it would fill four wide gaps in Arizona near Yuma, an area with some of the busiest corridors for illegal crossings.

In October 2023, Biden announced he would restart wall construction due to the surge of migrant crossings, while White House press secretary Karine Jean-Pierre stated that Biden believed that a border wall is "not effective". To expedite construction, the Biden administration would waive more than two dozen laws that "protect air, water and endangered species" such as the Clean Air Act, the Endangered Species Act and the National Historic Preservation Act. The administration claimed that the money for the wall construction was "allocated during Trump's term in 2019." In 2021, the congress controlled by the Democratic Party ignored Biden's request to rescind the funds. The decision was praised by former president Trump and criticized by Mexican president Andres Manuel Lopez Obrador as "a step backwards" and Jonathan Blazer, director of border strategies for the American Civil Liberties Union as "doubling down on the failed policies of the past." The nearly 20 miles of additional barrier in Starr County, Texas would be a "movable" design which Rodney S. Scott, a former United States Border Patrol Chief at the time, claimed would be "downgraded border wall."

On December 14, 2024, it was reported that sections of Arizona border wall were listed for public auction. On December 20, 2024, it was reported that President-elect Trump had asked a court to halt the sale of unused border wall materials by the Biden Administration. On January 8, 2025, Texas Attorney General Ken Paxton announced that he secured a court order to prevent the Biden Administration from auctioning off or disposing of any border wall materials prior to president-elect Trump assuming office.

==== Binational River Park ====
In 2021, in collaboration with the United States and Mexican ambassadors, as well as businessmen, a binational park was proposed along the Rio Grande between the border towns of Laredo, Texas and Nuevo Laredo, Mexico. Supported by the No Border Wall Coalition, the park aims to create a shared recreational space instead of a border wall. Earthjustice estimated that the decision not to build a border wall in Laredo saved 71 miles (114 km) of river from destruction and over $1 billion in taxpayer dollars.

==== Arizona container wall ====
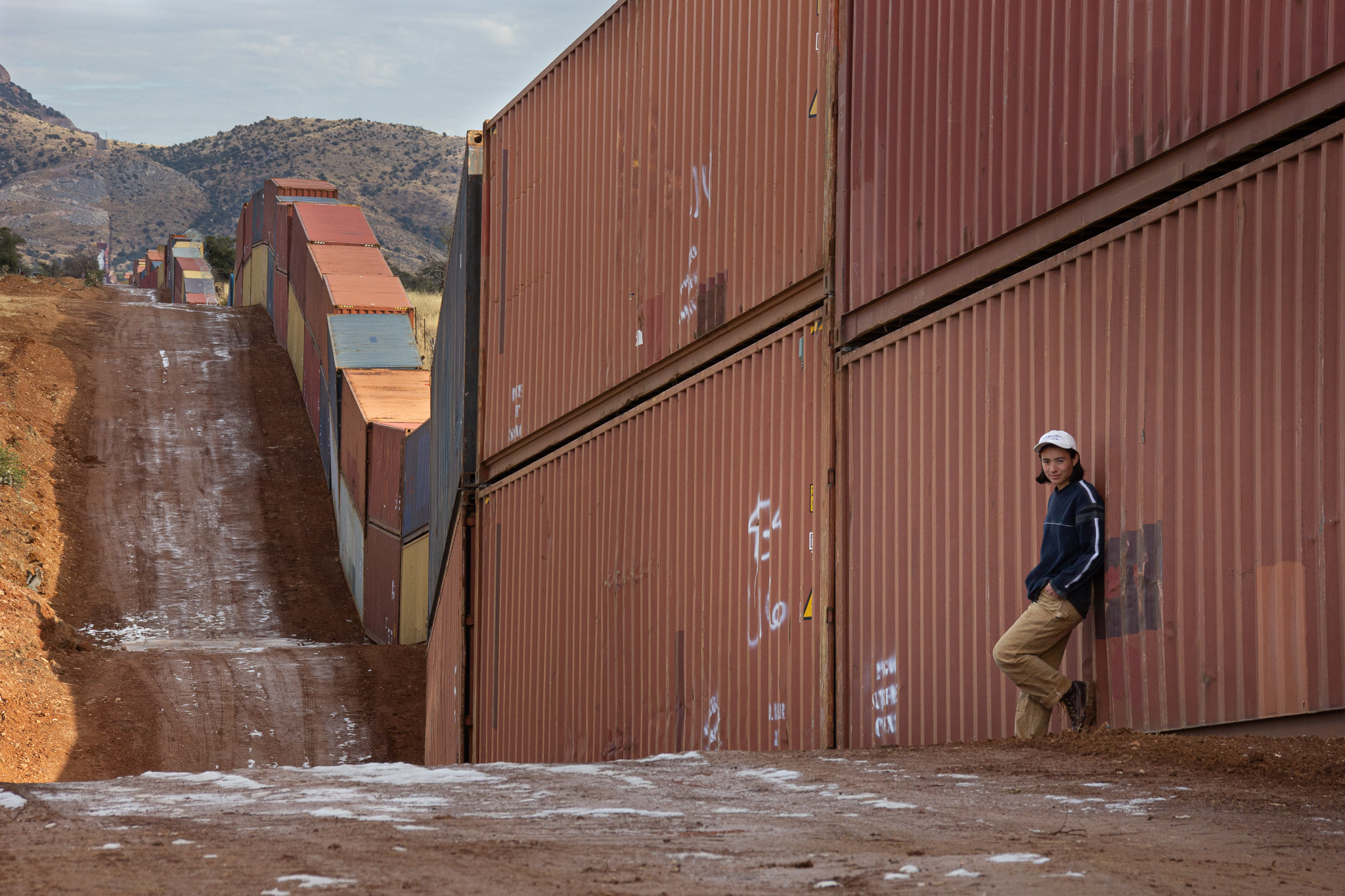
The Arizona container wall.

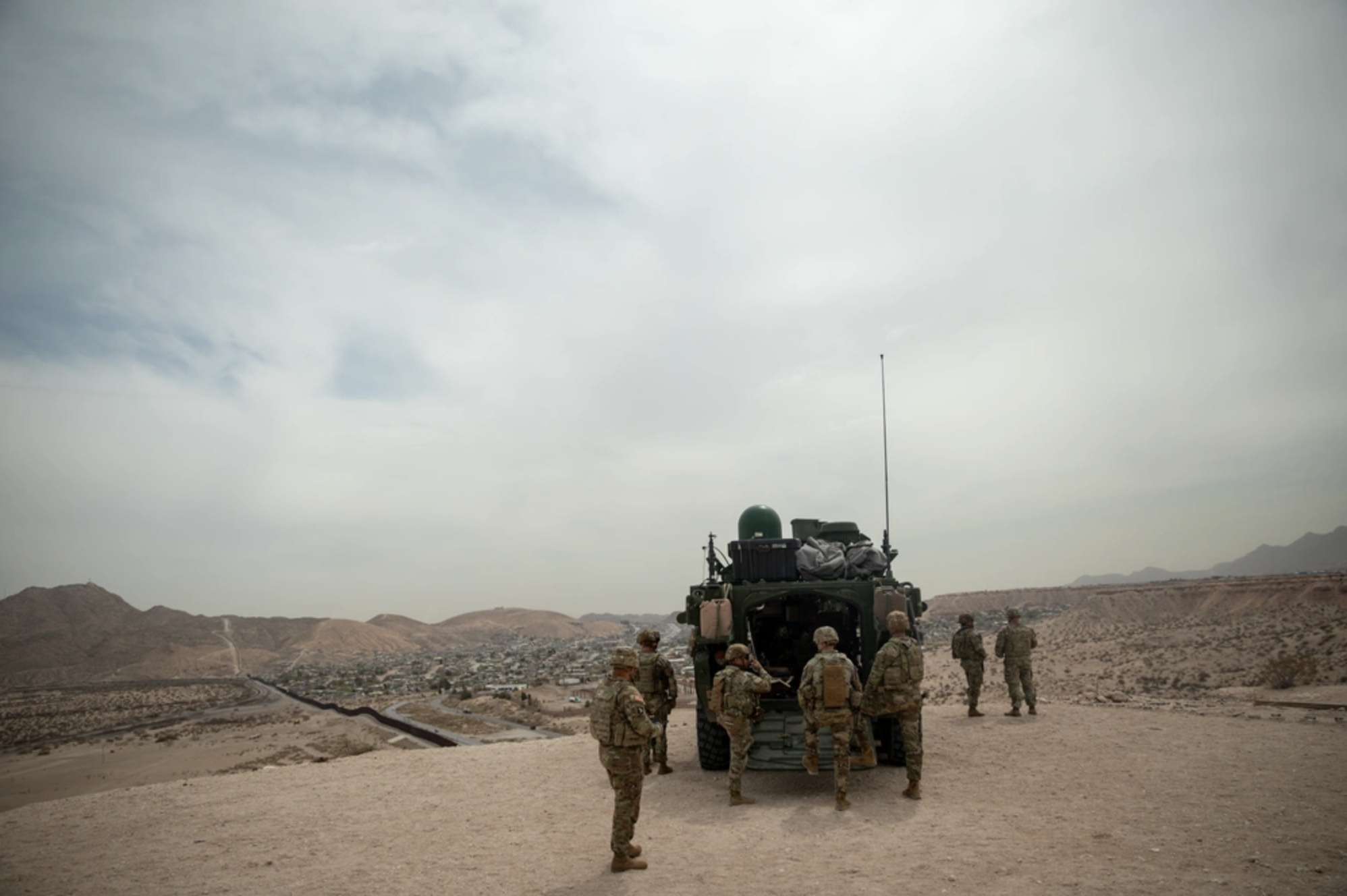
United States Army Soldiers, assigned to 1st Battalion, 41st Infantry Regiment, 2nd Stryker Brigade Combat Team, 4th Infantry Division, assigned to Joint Task Force-Southern Border (JTF-SB) conduct surveillance at the southern border using a Stryker vehicle, near Santa Teresa, New Mexico (March 27, 2025).

In August 2022, Arizona governor Doug Ducey ordered the erection of a makeshift wall of shipping containers on the border with Mexico in Cochise County, Arizona. The construction began in the Coronado National Forest without authorization from the U.S. Forest Service, which operates the land. Ecologists at the Center for Biological Diversity argue that the construction, which imperils at-risk species including the ocelot and jaguar, violates the Endangered Species Act of 1973 and have sued to halt its construction. Governor-elect Katie Hobbs stated that she would remove the containers after taking office, and the U.S. Justice Department sued the state to remove the containers and "compensate the [U.S.] for any actions it needs to take to undo Arizona's actions". Deconstruction of the container wall had begun by January 2023.

=== Second Trump administration (2025–present) ===
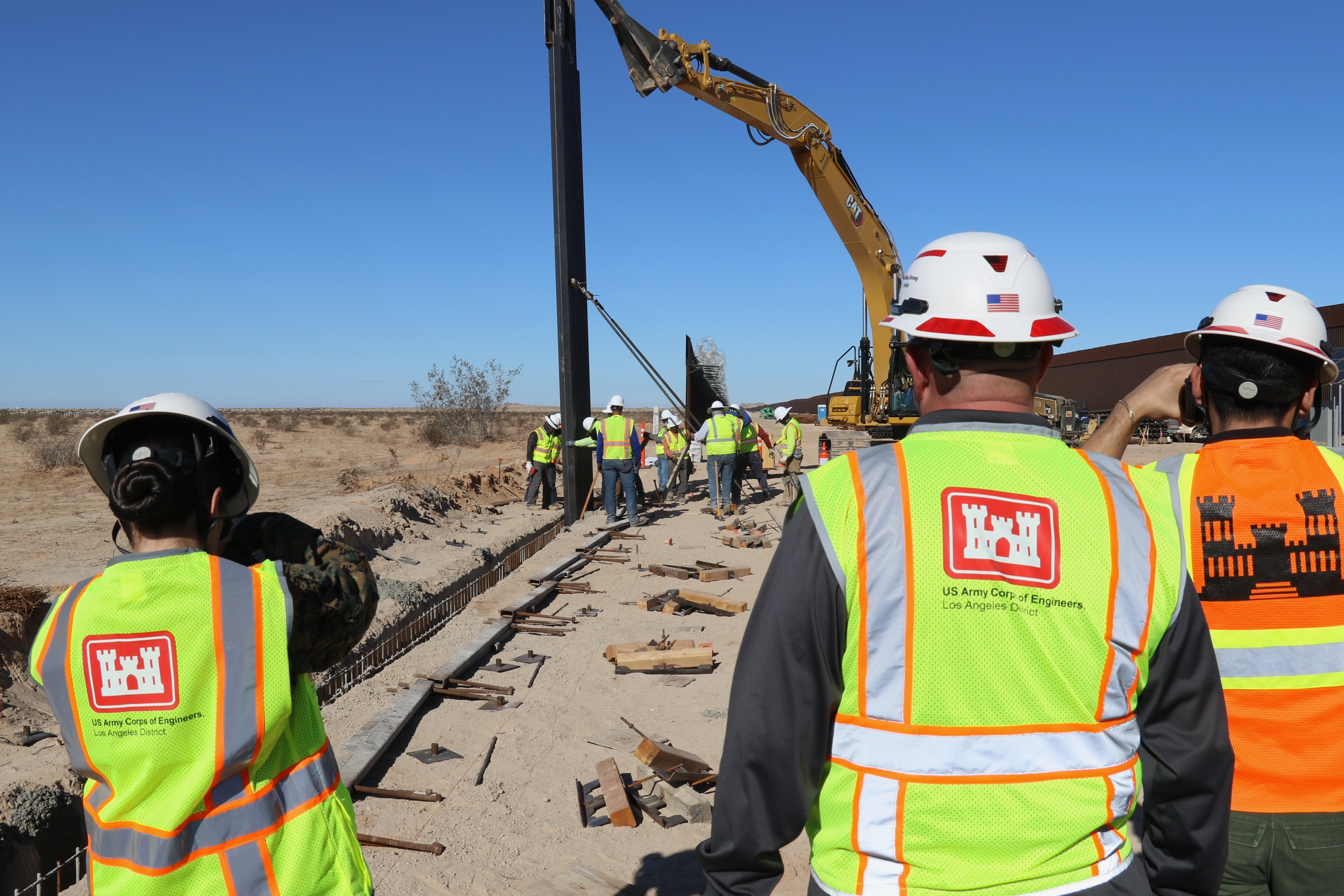
United States Army Corps of Engineers South Pacific Border Task Force install the first border barrier panel at the Barry M. Goldwater Range (BMGR-1) project site near Yuma, Arizona (October 15, 2025).

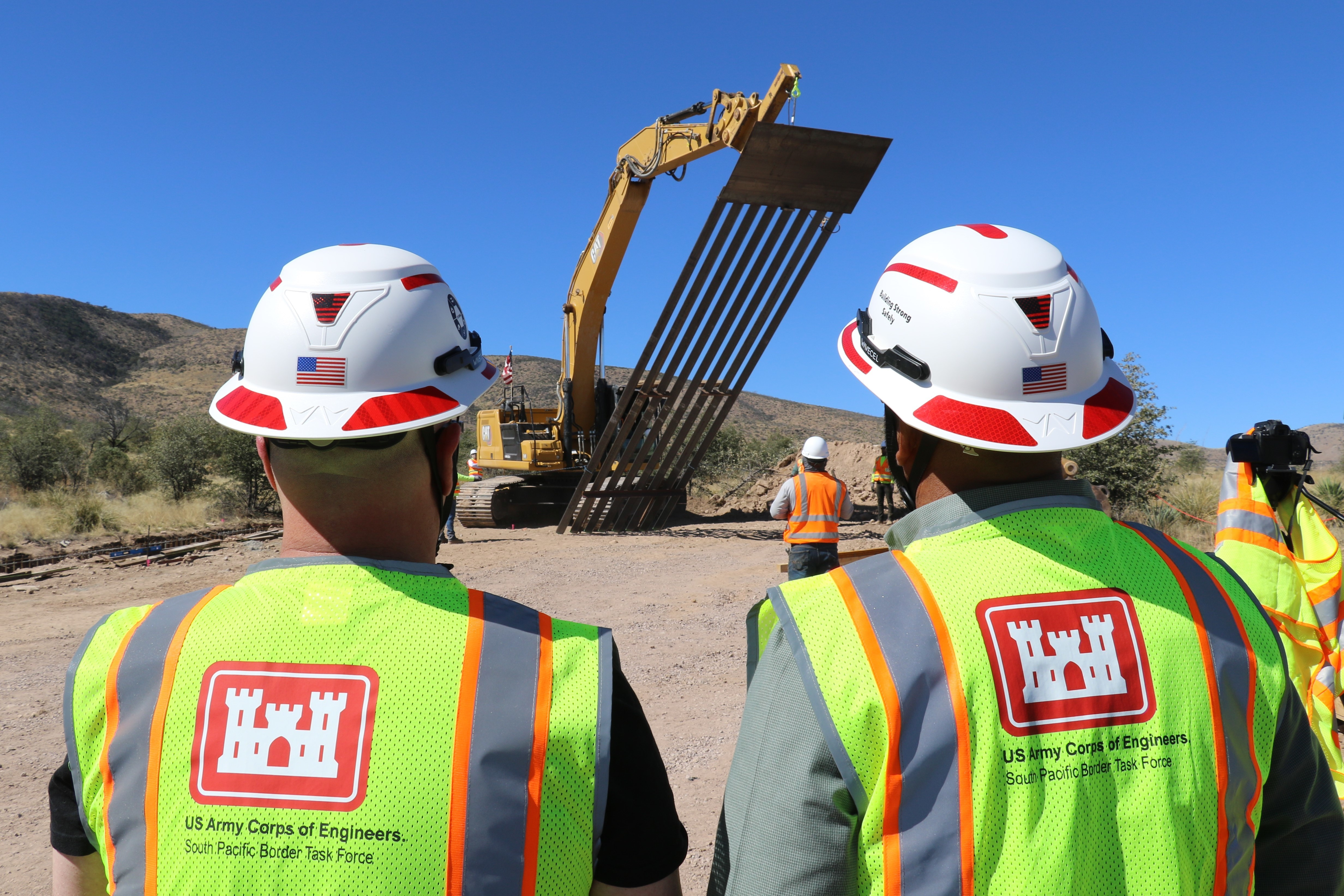
United States Army Corps of Engineers South Pacific Border Task Force installs the first border barrier panel at the National Defense Area One (NDA-1) project site near Antelope Wells, New Mexico (March 3, 2026).

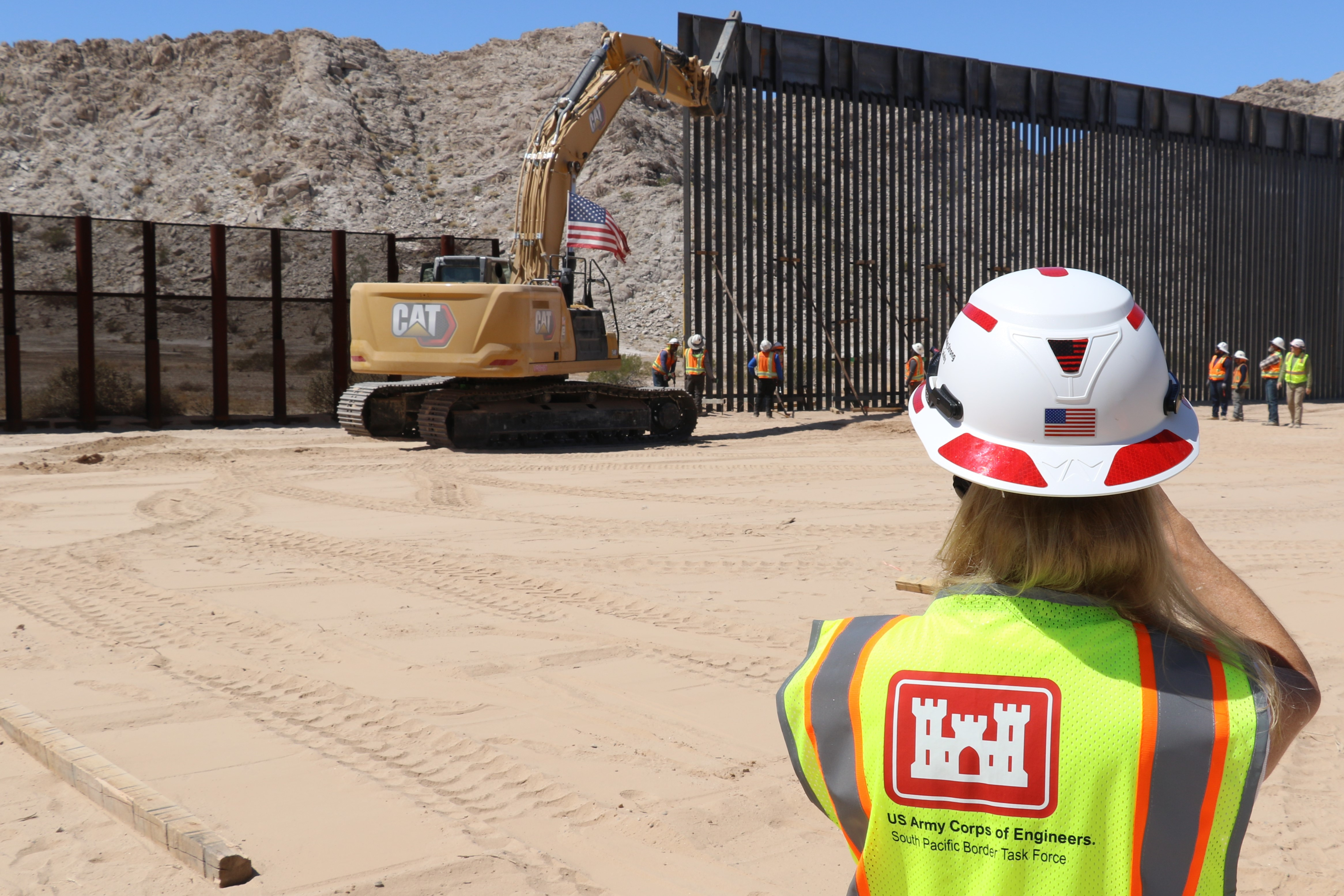
United States Army Corps of Engineers South Pacific Border Task Force installs the final border barrier panel at the Barry M. Goldwater Range (BMGR-1) project site near Yuma, Arizona (April 15, 2026).

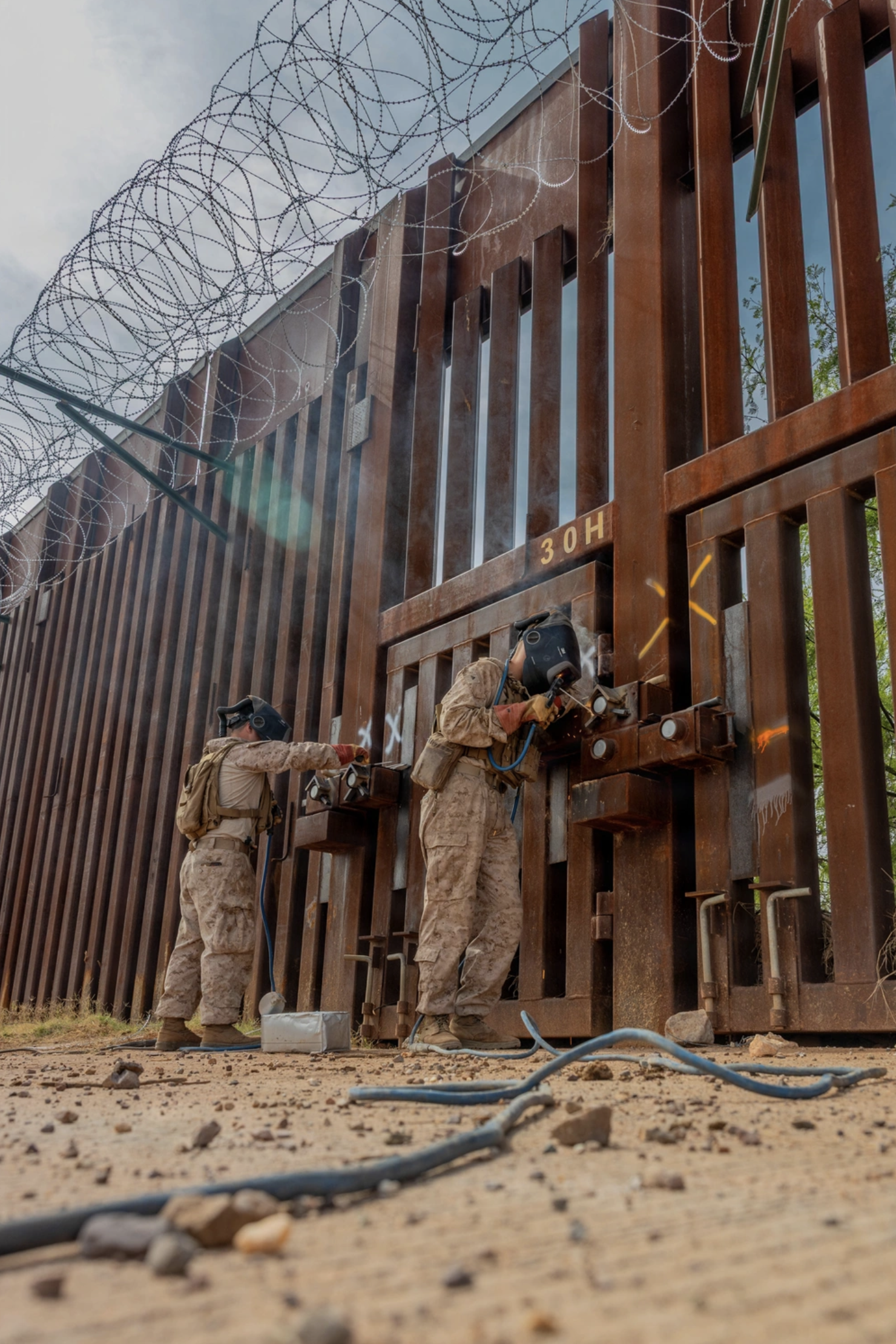
United States Marine Corps engineer equipment mechanics with Combat Logistics Battalion 7, 1st Marine Logistics Group, assigned to Joint Task Force-Southern Border (JTF-SB) in support of Operation Ardent Vanguard, reinforce flood gate locks along the southern barrier in Naco, Arizona. (July 3, 2026).

In January 2025, re-elected president Donald Trump pledged to finish the wall during his second term. On January 20, 2025, President Trump declared a national emergency to direct the departments of State and Defense to resume construction of the wall. On January 20, 2025, President Trump also issued an Executive Order which assigned United States Northern Command the mission to secure the borders of the United States. The Order also directed United States Northern Command to provide a commander's estimate to the secretary of defense within 30 days. On January 22, 2025, the Department of Defense announced the order of 1,500 troops to the southern border. On January 24, 2025, United States Northern Command announced the specific activation of units from the United States Army and United States Marine Corps to bolster security at the southern border. These initial units, comprising approximately 1,500 personnel, were tasked with supporting enhanced detection efforts as well as the repair and emplacement of physical barriers on the southern border. A substantial number of additional personnel and equipment were added to the southern border mission over the following months. Joint Task Force-Southern Border (JTF-SB) was activated on March 14, 2025 and on March 25, 2025, it assumed authority of the southern border mission.

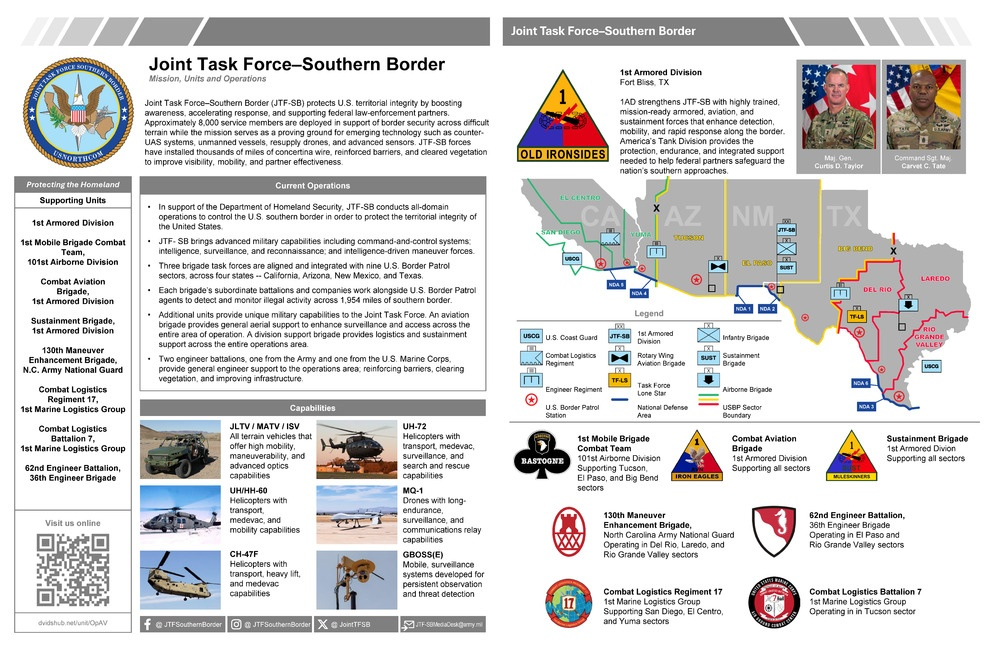
Joint Task Force-Southern Border (JTF-SB) Fact Sheet - Information about the mission, units and operations of Joint Task Force–Southern Border (JTF-SB): August 4, 2026.

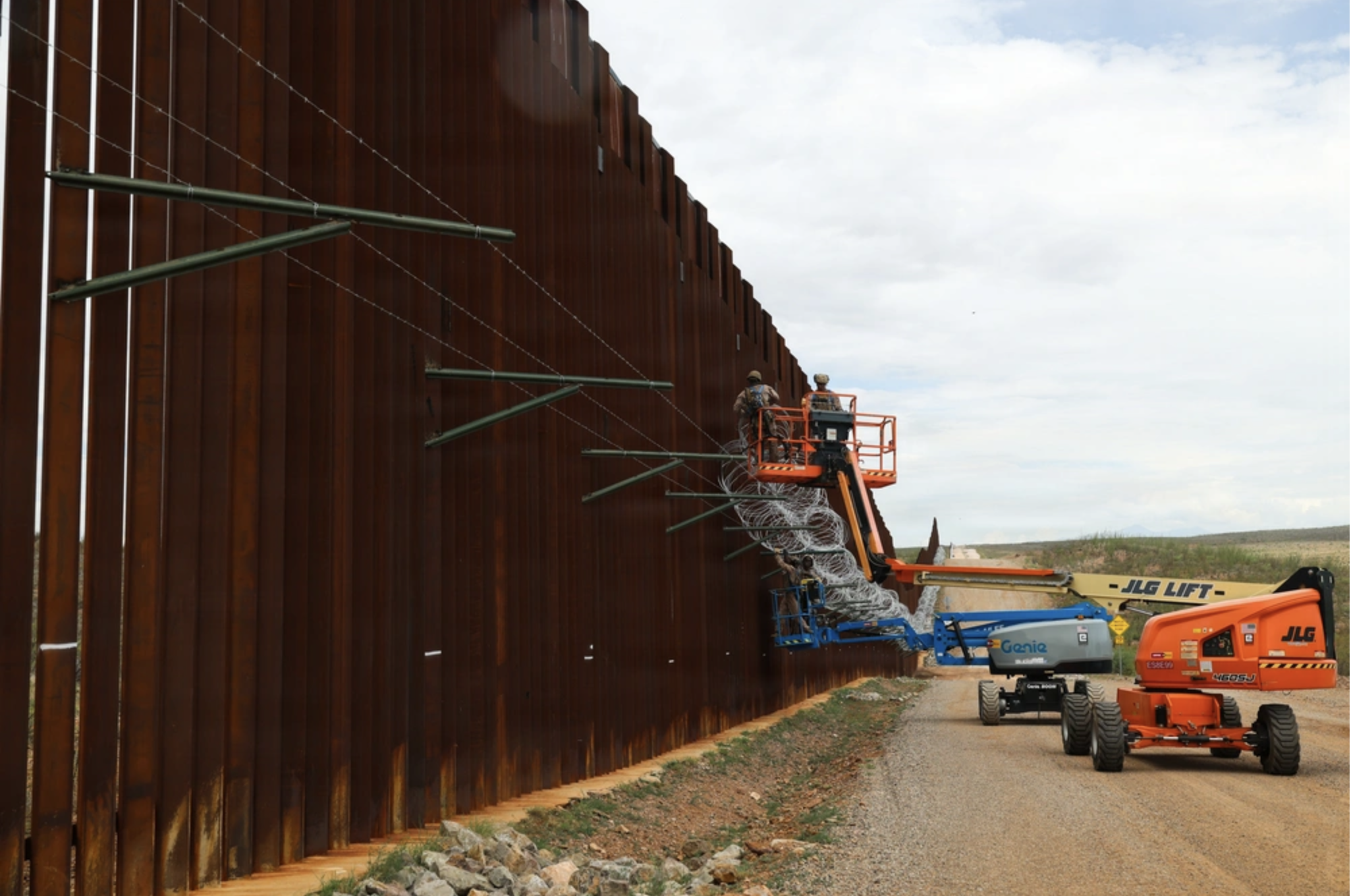
United States Marines with Combat Logistics Battalion 7, 1st Marine Logistics Group, assigned to Joint Task Force-Southern Border (JTF-SB) in support of Operation Ardent Vanguard, conduct barrier reinforcement operations in Naco, Arizona. (July 14, 2026).

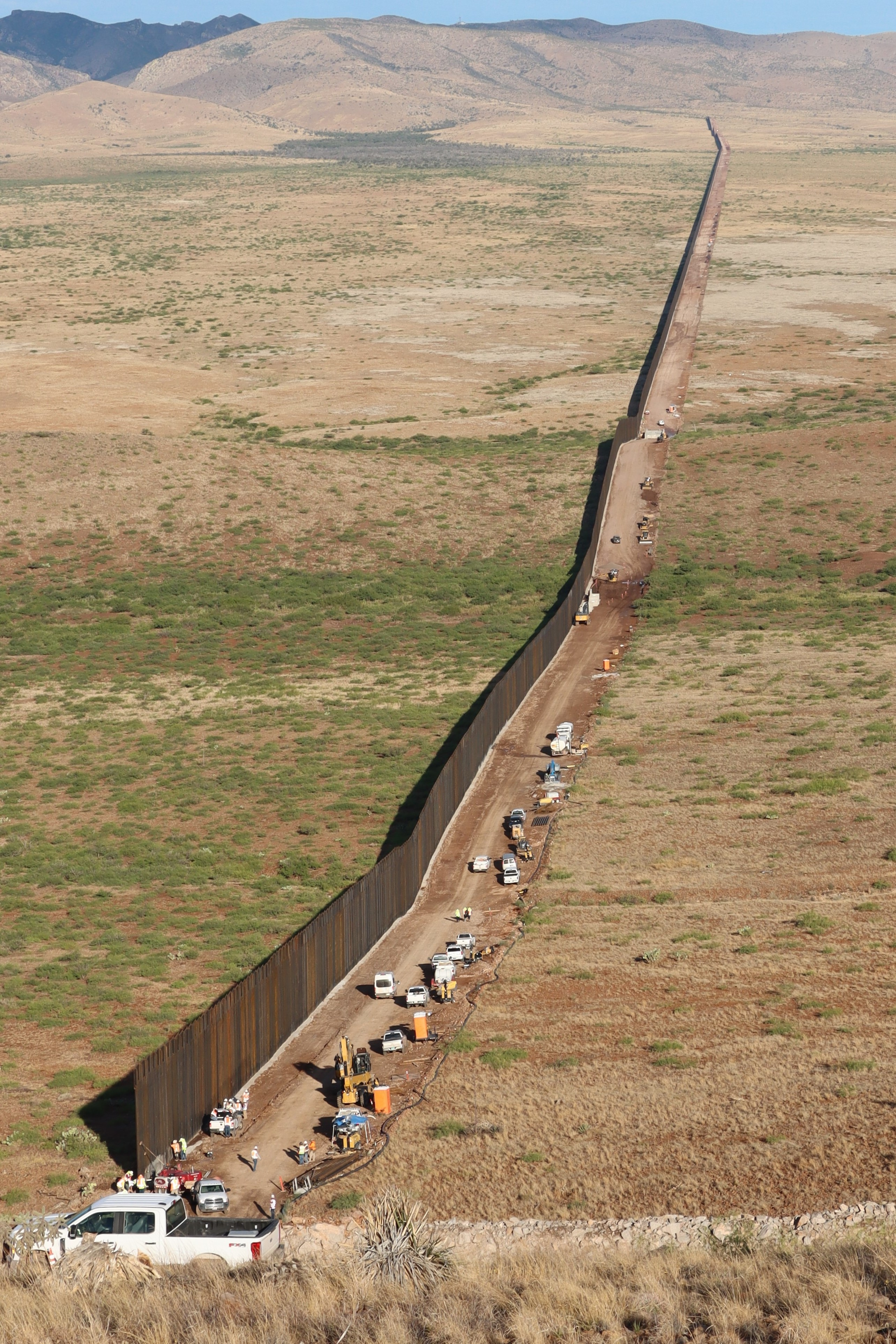
United States Army Corps of Engineers South Pacific Border Task Force completed border barrier installation at the National Defense Area One (NDA-1) project site near Antelope Wells, New Mexico (July 17, 2026).

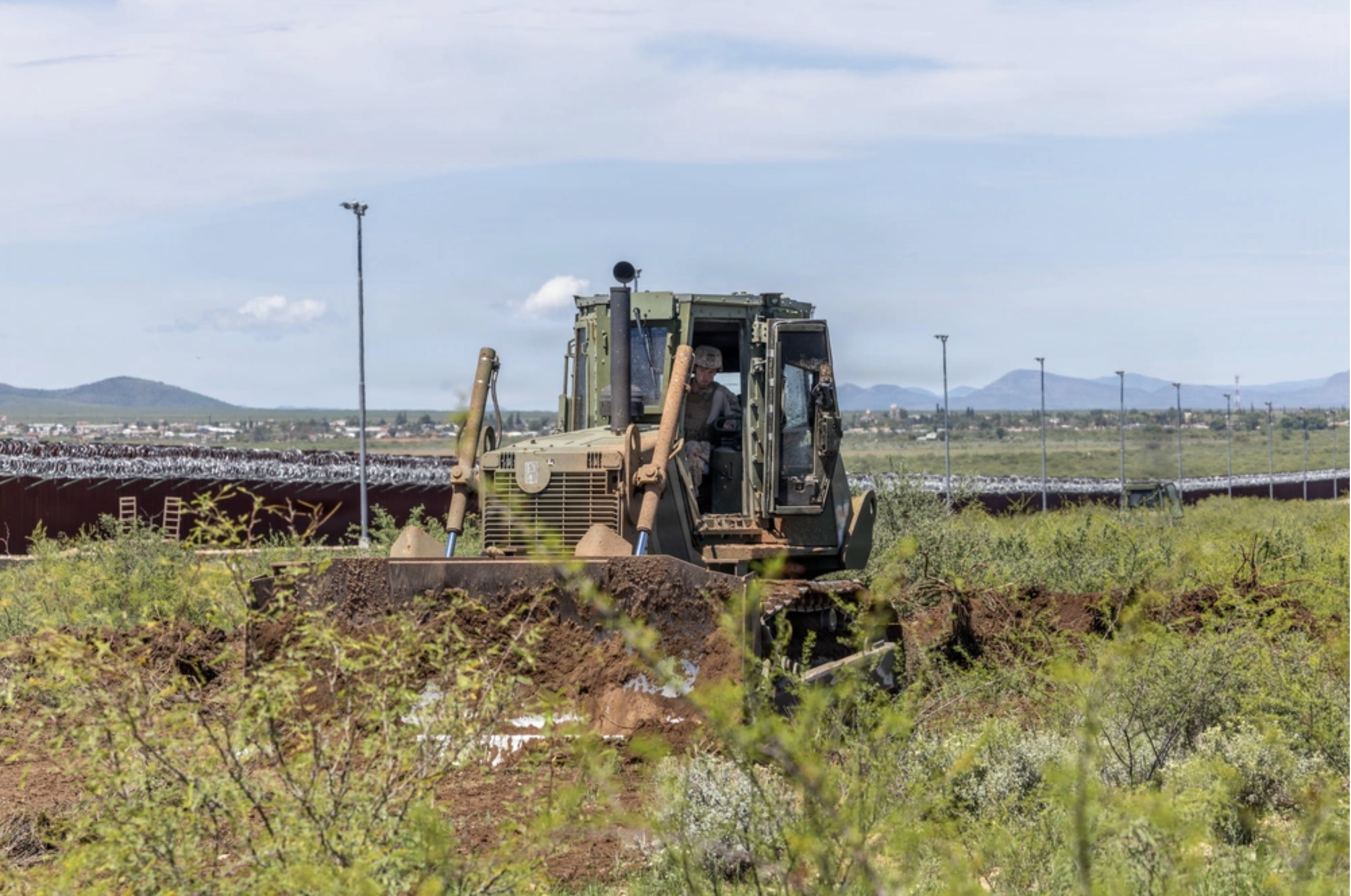
United States Marine Corps engineer equipment operator with the 8th Engineer Support Battalion, assigned to Joint Task Force-Southern Border (JTF-SB) in support of Operation Ardent Vanguard, operates a bulldozer to conduct vegetation clearance operations in Naco, Arizona. (July 28, 2026).

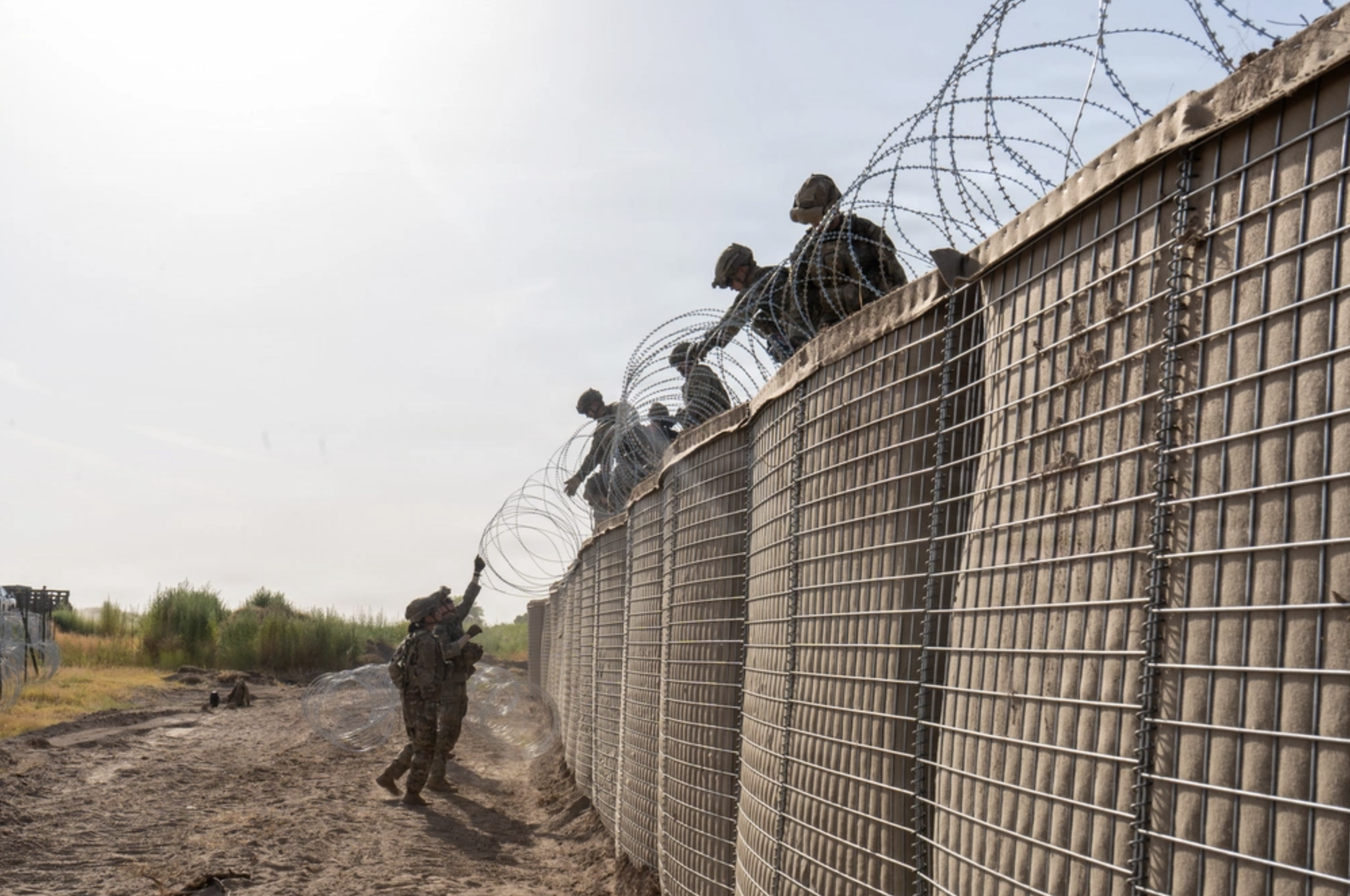
United States Army Soldiers with the 591st Engineer Company, 326th Brigade Engineer Battalion, 101st Airborne Division, assigned to Joint Task Force-Southern Border (JTF-SB) in support of Operation Ardent Vanguard, place concertina wire on top of HESCO barriers at National Defense Area 2 near Fort Hancock, Texas (August 6, 2026).

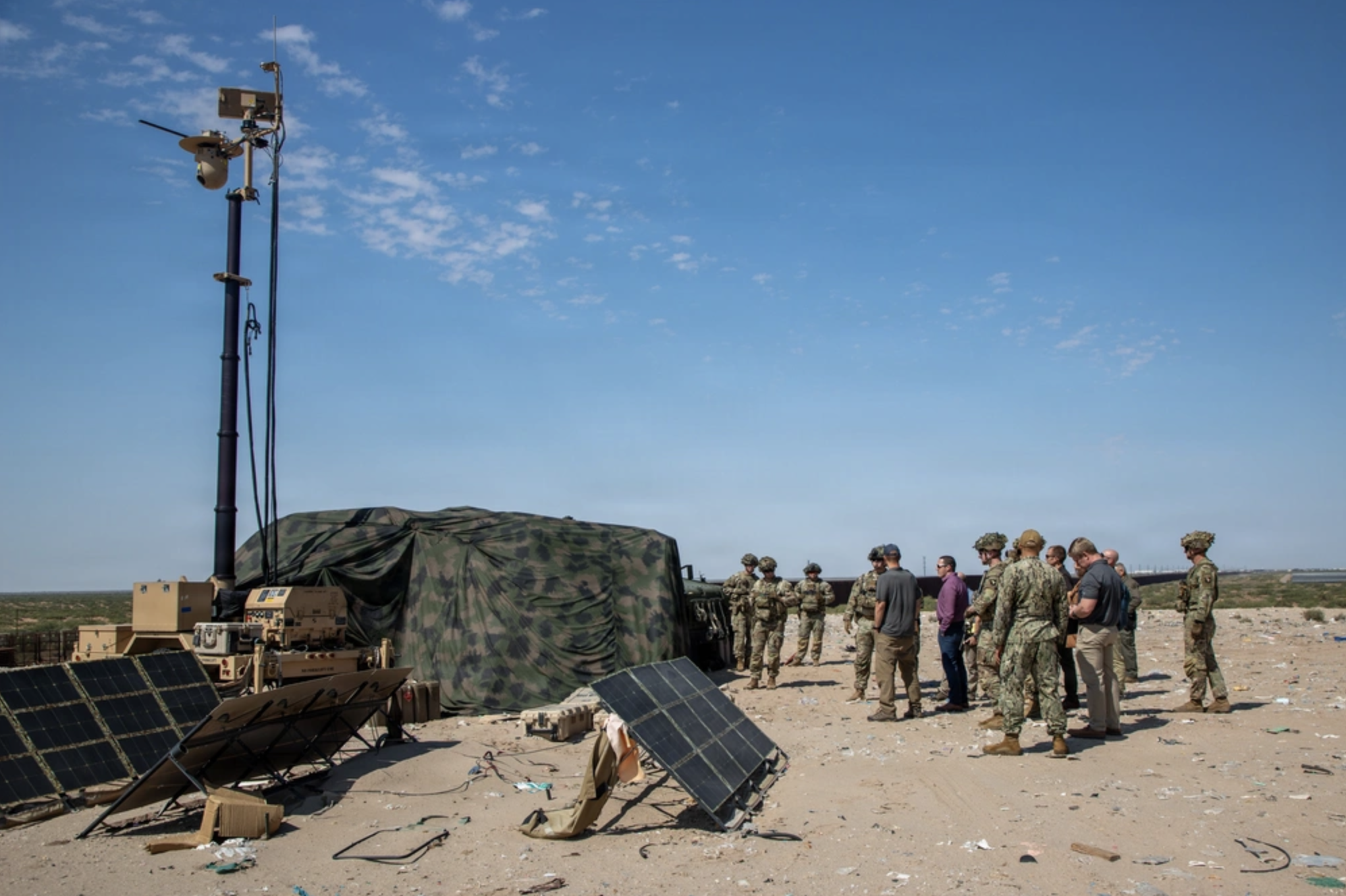
United States Army Soldiers with 1st Battalion, 327th Infantry Regiment, 1st Mobile Brigade Combat Team, 101st Airborne Division, assigned to Joint Task Force-Southern Border (JTF-SB) in support of Operation Ardent Vanguard, brief members of the U.S. Northern Command (USNORTHCOM) Requirements, Analysis and Resources team, as they observe a Ground-Based Operational Surveillance System-Expeditionary (GBOSS-E) near Sunland Park, New Mexico (August 11, 2026).

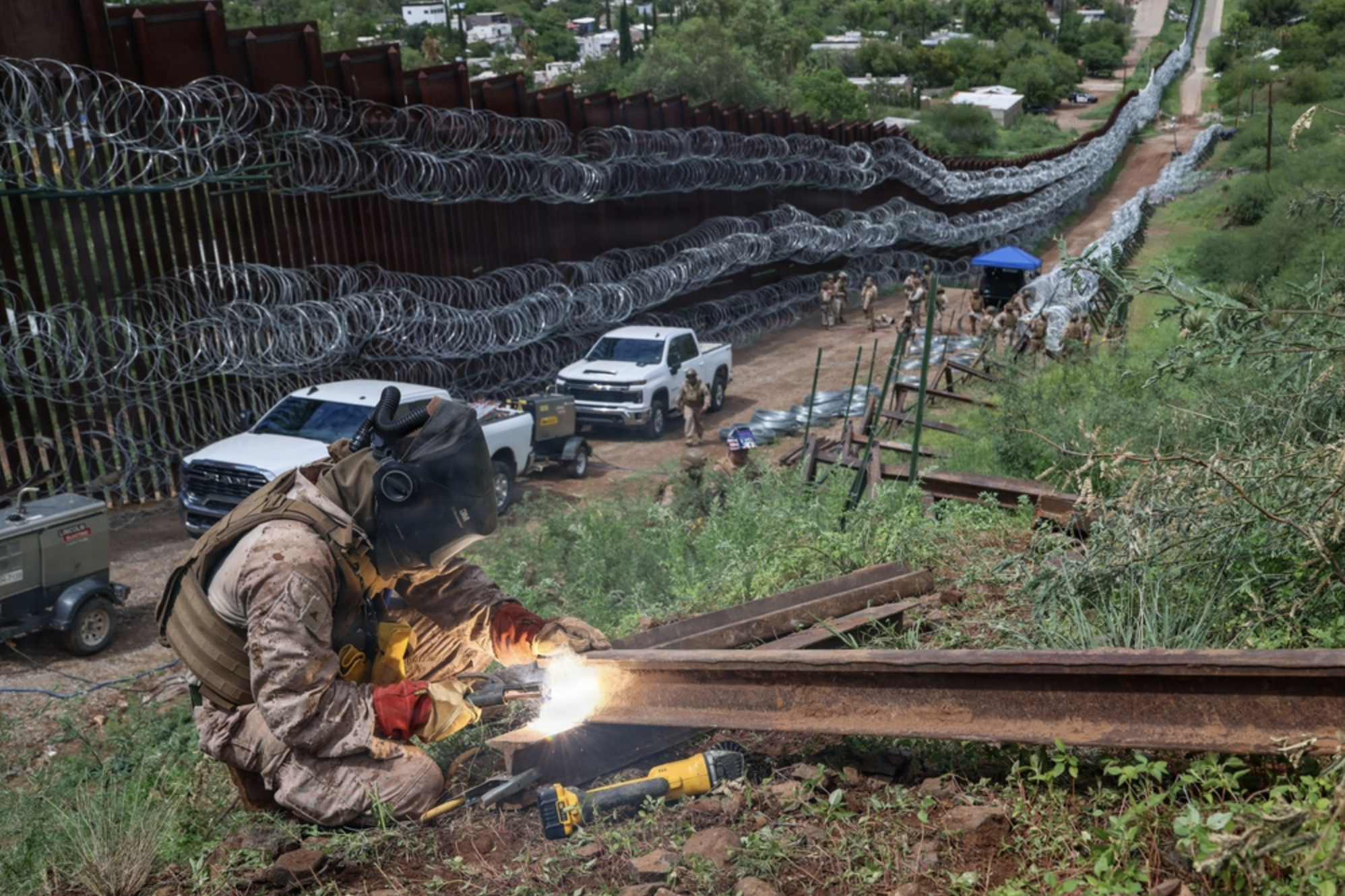
United States Marine Corps motor vehicle operator with Combat Logistics Battalion 7, 1st Marine Logistics Group, assigned to Joint Task Force-Southern Border (JTF-SB) in support of Operation Ardent Vanguard, welds support beams together to construct a secondary expeditionary barrier in Nogales, Arizona (August 12, 2026).

To bolster existing surveillance capabilities at the Border, the Department of Defense authorized the deployment of Stryker vehicles as well as Ground-Based Operational Surveillance System (Expeditionary) [G-BOSS-(E)] units. Deployed military units have been utilized to install Concertina wire on existing border infrastructure, to construct new barriers, to make infrastructure upgrades/repairs, to grade terrain/remove vegetation and to conduct stationary/roving patrols. On March 14, 2026, Joint Task Force-Southern Border marked one year of operations. On June 9, 2026, United States Northern Command announced that all military efforts supporting the Department of Homeland Security and United States Customs and Border Protection to secure the southern border would be unified under Operation Ardent Vanguard.

Joint Task Force-Southern Border (JTF-SB) Headquarters Lineage:

- March 14, 2025 - October 10, 2025: 10th Mountain Division
- October 10, 2025 - May 29, 2026: 101st Airborne Division (Air Assault)
- May 29, 2026 – Present: 1st Armored Division

The amount of existing wall (prior to 1/20/2025) that met United States Border Patrol operational requirements was ~644 miles (1,036 km) of Primary Wall and ~75 miles (121 km) of Secondary Wall. President Trump initially utilized residual Fiscal Year 2021 funds that were not spent by the Biden administration to continue work on the border wall. On March 15, 2025, United States Customs and Border Protection (CBP) announced the award of the first border wall contract of President Trump's second term for approximately 7 miles of new border wall in Hidalgo County, Texas, within the Rio Grande Valley Sector, using CBP's Fiscal Year 2021 funds. Additional contracts followed which also utilized previously appropriated funds.

On April 8, 2025, Secretary Noem issued the department's first waiver for the new Administration to enable the immediate construction of approximately 2.5 miles of new border wall in San Diego County, California. On April 1, 2025, the New Mexico National Defense Area (NDA-1) was established totaling approximately 111,000 acres, covering approximately 170 miles, ranging from 60 feet to one-mile wide over noncontiguous land along the southern border from the Arizona/New Mexico state line to the New Mexico/Texas state line, and served as an extension of Fort Huachuca. On May 1, 2025, a second National Defense Area was established in Texas (NDA-2), covering approximately 63 miles of noncontiguous land between El Paso and Fort Hancock, Texas, and served as an extension of Fort Bliss. On June 5, 2025, Secretary Noem issued three additional waivers for approximately 36 miles of new border wall in Arizona and New Mexico, funded through Fiscal Year 2020 and Fiscal Year 2021 appropriations. On June 18, 2025, CBP awarded the Trump Administration's second contract for border wall construction for approximately 27 miles of new border wall in Santa Cruz County, Arizona, located within the U.S. Border Patrol's Tucson Sector utilizing CBP's Fiscal Year 2021 funds. Also on June 18, 2025, Secretary Noem issued the department's fifth waiver to expedite construction of up to approximately 17 miles of new border wall in Rio Grande Valley Sector, Texas utilizing Fiscal Year 2021 appropriations. On July 3, 2025, Secretary Noem issued a waiver to expedite construction of approximately 17 miles of waterborne barrier in Rio Grande Valley Sector, Texas utilizing Fiscal Year 2021 appropriations.

On July 3, 2025, the Republican-controlled Congress passed the One Big Beautiful Bill Act which includes $46.5 billion to complete construction of the wall on the United States–Mexico border, along with:

- $17.3 billion to support state and local law enforcement with border enforcement.
- $10 billion to reimburse the Department of Homeland Security for costs related to border security.
- $7.8 billion for hiring Border Patrol agents and vehicles, to hire 3,000 new agents.
- $6.2 billion for border detection technology such as cameras, lights, and sensors.

Border wall construction continued in the areas of Tucson, Arizona, and San Diego, California. The administration contracted with Anduril, General Dynamics, and Elbit to install autonomous surveillance towers along the border. Over $2.5 billion in funding was awarded to construct floating barriers in the Rio Grande. On June 25, 2025, the secretary of defense directed the establishment of a South Texas National Defense Area (NDA-3) covering approximately 250 miles of the Rio Grande in Cameron and Hidalgo Counties, Texas. On July 23, 2025, the Department of the Interior transferred approximately 285 acres of public land, comprising 138 linear miles, in Yuma County, Arizona, to the Department of the Navy for a period of three years to establish the Yuma National Defense Area (NDA-4). In July 2025, the Pentagon shifted $200 million in funding originally allocated for projects including barracks, aircraft hangars and military-operated elementary schools to construct a wall along the Barry M. Goldwater Range. With the Department of War as the Executing Agency, the construction contract was awarded by the United States Army Corps of Engineers South Pacific Task Force to BFBC LLC, a specialized subsidiary of Barnard Construction Company, on August 15, 2025. Construction commenced on October 15, 2025, and installation of 15.22 miles of wall along the Range was completed on April 15, 2026, approximately two months ahead of schedule.

On August 15, 2025, it was reported that up to $350 million in unused construction materials that were previously set for auction by the Biden Administration would be returned to the U.S. Government.

On August 26, 2025, Secretary Noem signed a waiver for approximately 5 miles of border wall under construction in Starr and Hidalgo Counties within Rio Grande Valley Sector, Texas utilizing Fiscal Year 2019 appropriations.

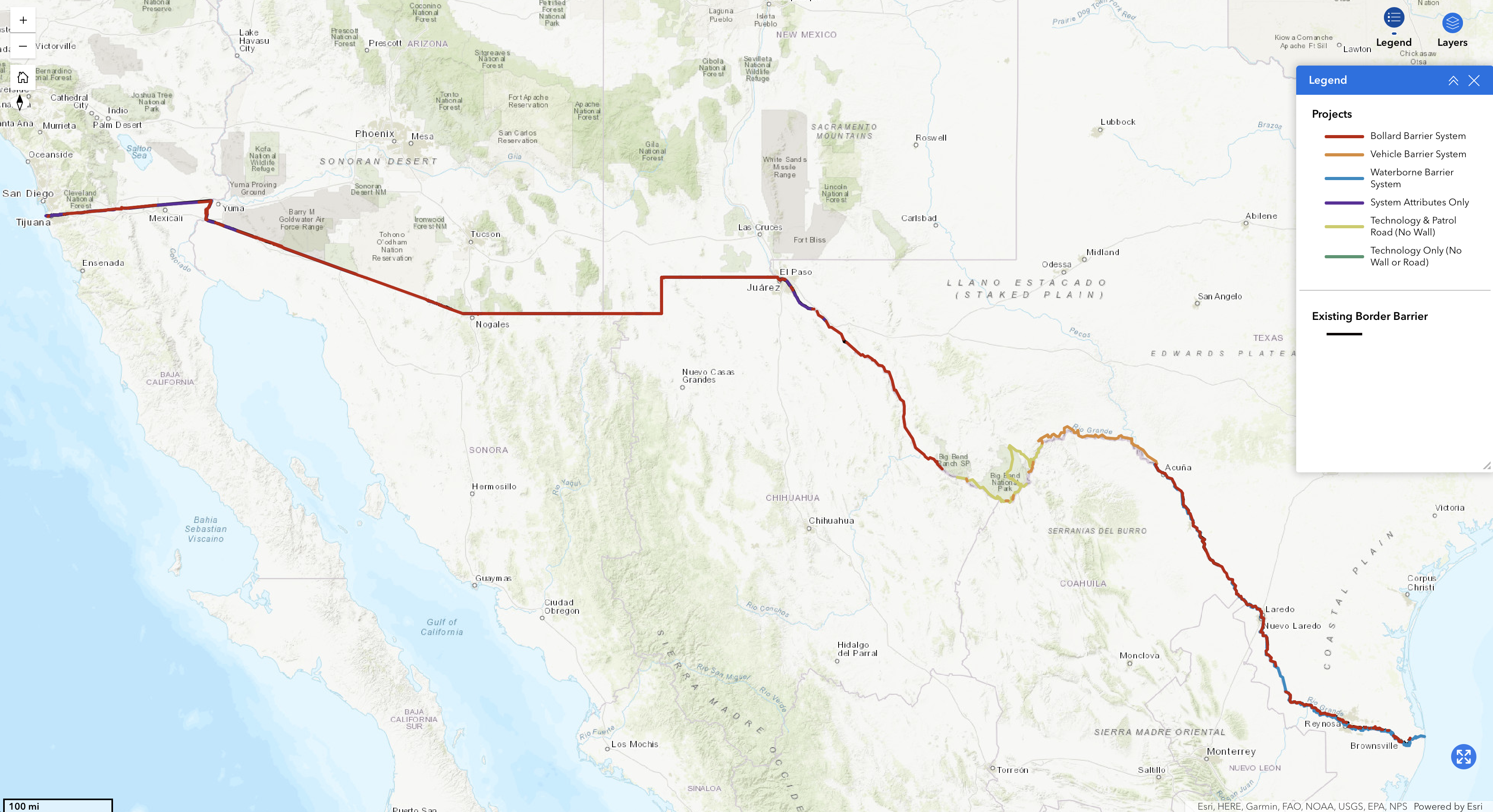
Smart Wall Map - U.S. Customs and Border Protection - August 11, 2026

On October 10, 2025, United States Customs and Border Protection announced the award of 10 construction contracts totaling $4.5 billion to construct 230 miles of barrier and officially designated the initiative as a Smart Wall, with an interactive Smart Wall Map, to reflect the layers of "System Attributes" and other detection technology that would be incorporated into the design. These contracts were the first to be funded by President Trump's One Big Beautiful Bill Act and also included a minimal amount of Fiscal Year 2021 appropriations. As part of the announcement, Secretary Noem also issued two waivers to expedite construction of approximately 9 miles of wall in San Diego Sector, California and approximately 30 miles (48 km) of new wall in El Paso Sector, New Mexico. As of mid-December 2025, United States Customs and Border Protection was averaging two miles of wall installed per week, and it intended to increase this to 10 miles per week, according to then-CBP chief Mike Banks. In December 2025, DHS signed a $609 million contract with Parsons to oversee border wall construction. DHS also signed a $594 million contract with AECOM for border wall construction management support services. On December 10, 2025, the Department of Interior announced the transfer of 760 acres (310 ha) of public land in San Diego and Imperial Counties, California to the Department of the Navy for a three-year period to establish a California National Defense Area (NDA-5). On December 9, 2025, with the Department of War as the Executing Agency, the United States Army Corps of Engineers South Pacific Task Force awarded a $78.9 million contract to BFBC, LLC for the NDA-1 wall project. This project contracts for the installation of up to 6 miles of border wall in Hidalgo County, New Mexico. Construction commenced on March 3, 2026 with a contractual completion date of October 2, 2026. Construction of the border wall component was completed on July 17, 2026. and work to finish the patrol road and access road components is continuing. On December 18, 2025, DHS and CBP announced the award of five new contracts totaling $3.3 billion for the construction of Smart Wall in Texas and Arizona utilizing funds from the One Big Beautiful Bill Act.

Overall, United States Customs and Border Protection has awarded contracts for all 34 Smart Wall projects using funds from the One Big Beautiful Bill Act. The contracts provide for Primary Wall, Secondary Wall, Waterborne Barrier, Detection Technology and Vehicle Barrier (low-profile post-on-rail) construction in the following Border Patrol Sectors: San Diego Sector; El Centro Sector; Yuma Sector; Tucson Sector; El Paso Sector; Big Bend Sector; Del Rio Sector; Laredo Sector; and Rio Grande Valley Sector.

Project	Award Date	Contractor(s)	Details
San Diego 1 Wall Project	September 15, 2025	BCCG Joint Venture	~9 miles of Primary Border Wall. ~52 miles of detection technology on existing barrier.
San Diego 2 Wall Project	April 24, 2026	Fisher Sand & Gravel Co.	~43 miles of Secondary Border Wall.
El Centro 1 Wall Project	September 26, 2025	Fisher Sand & Gravel Co.	~9 miles of Primary Border Wall. ~37 miles of Secondary Border Wall. ~63 miles of detection technology on existing barrier.
El Centro 2 Wall Project	May 4, 2026	Fisher Sand & Gravel Co.	~34 miles of Secondary Border Wall.
Yuma 1 Wall Project	September 19, 2025	Barnard Spencer Joint Venture	~60 miles of detection technology on existing barrier.
Yuma 2 Wall Project	December 23, 2025	Fisher Sand & Gravel Co.	~31 miles of Primary Border Wall. ~52 miles of Secondary Border Wall. ~.5 miles of Waterborne Barrier.
Tucson 1 Wall Project	September 19, 2025	BCCG Joint Venture	~23 miles of Secondary Border Wall. ~66 miles of detection technology on existing barrier.
Tucson 2 Wall Project	December 16, 2025	Fisher Sand & Gravel Co.	~21 miles of Primary Border Wall. ~91 miles of Secondary Border Wall. 135 miles of detection technology on existing barrier.
Tucson 3 Wall Project	May 14, 2026	Fisher Sand & Gravel Co.	~66 miles of Secondary Border Wall.
Tucson 4 Wall Project	May 29, 2026	Sundt Construction	~13 miles of Primary Border Wall. ~45 miles of Secondary Border Wall.
Tucson 5 Wall Project	June 26, 2026	SLSCO LTD	~62 miles of Primary Border Wall.
El Paso 1 Wall Project	September 15, 2025	BCCG Joint Venture	~7 miles of Primary Border Wall. ~22 miles of detection technology on existing barrier.
El Paso 2 Wall Project	September 19, 2025	Barnard Spencer Joint Venture	~23 miles of Primary Border Wall. ~67 miles of detection technology on existing barrier.
El Paso 3 Wall Project	September 24, 2025	BCCG Joint Venture	~44 miles of Primary Border Wall. ~6 miles of Secondary Border Wall. ~42 miles of detection technology on existing barrier.
El Paso 4 Wall Project	January 6, 2026	Fisher Sand & Gravel Co.	~49 miles of Primary Border Wall. ~60 miles of Secondary Border Wall. ~6 miles of detection technology on existing barrier.
El Paso 5 Wall Project	April 24, 2026	Barnard Construction Company, Inc.	~113 miles of Secondary Border Wall.
Big Bend 1 Wall Project	March 6, 2026	Barnard Construction Company, Inc.	~47 miles of Primary Border Wall.
Big Bend 2 Wall Project	March 6, 2026	Fisher Sand & Gravel Co.	~62 miles of Primary Border Wall.
Big Bend 3 Wall Project	March 6, 2026	Barnard Construction Company, Inc.	~56 miles of Primary Border Wall.
Big Bend 4 Project	May 11, 2026	Southwest Valley Constructors Co.	~17 miles of Vehicle Barrier (Low Profile Post-On-Rail, Patrol Roads, Technology). ~205 miles of Patrol Roads and/or Technology depending on location.
Big Bend 5 Project	June 2, 2026	Fisher Sand & Gravel Co.	~166 miles of Vehicle Barrier (Low Profile Post-on-Rail, Patrol Roads, Technology).
Del Rio 1 Wall Project	September 26, 2025	BCCG Joint Venture	~22 miles of Primary Border Wall. ~40 miles of Waterborne Barrier.
Del Rio 2 Wall Project	September 25, 2025	BCCG Joint Venture	~7 miles of Primary Border Wall. ~23 miles of Waterborne Barrier. ~10 miles of detection technology on existing barrier.
Del Rio 3 Wall Project	November 21, 2025	SLSCO LTD	~22 miles of Primary Border Wall. ~13 miles of detection technology on existing barrier.
Del Rio 4 Wall Project	March 6, 2026	(1) Barnard Construction Company, Inc. (2) Spencer Construction, LLC	Contract (1): ~32 miles of Primary Border Wall. Contract (2): ~36 miles of Waterborne Barrier.
Laredo 1 Wall Project	December 16, 2025	Fisher Sand & Gravel Co.	~15 miles of Primary Border Wall. ~16 miles of Waterborne Barrier.
Laredo 2 Wall Project	December 16, 2025	(1) SLSCO LTD (2) Fisher Sand & Gravel Co.	Contract (1): ~41 miles of Primary Border Wall. Contract (2): ~50 miles of Waterborne Barrier.
Laredo 3 Wall Project	March 6, 2026	(1) Southwest Valley Constructors Co. (2) Spencer Construction, LLC	Contract (1): ~25 miles of Primary Border Wall. Contract (2): ~56 miles of Waterborne Barrier.
Laredo 4 Wall Project	March 9, 2026	Granite Construction Company	~27 miles of Primary Border Wall.
Rio Grande Valley Waterborne Barrier Project	September 27, 2025	BCCG Joint Venture	~17 miles of Waterborne Barrier.
Rio Grande Valley 1 Wall Project	January 27, 2026	(1) Barnard Construction Company, Inc. (2) Spencer Construction, LLC	Contract (1): ~10 miles of Primary Border Wall. Contract (2): ~59 miles of Waterborne Barrier.
Rio Grande Valley 2 Wall Project	March 6, 2026	Spencer Construction, LLC	~109 miles of Waterborne Barrier.
Rio Grande Valley 3 Wall Project	March 6, 2026	Cochrane USA, Inc.	~126 miles of Waterborne Barrier.
Rio Grande Valley 4 Wall Project	March 18, 2026	Spencer Construction, LLC	~33 miles of Primary Border Wall. ~3 miles of detection technology on existing barrier.

- Note: United States Customs and Border Protection is adding ~538 miles of technology in locations with existing border barrier. ~205 miles of detection technology in the Big Bend Sector will be deployed near the vehicle barriers. ~167 miles of the Mexico-United States Border without barrier will be covered by other detection technology due to unfavorable terrain or remoteness of location. This represents a total of 372 miles of the border covered solely by technology.

On February 6, 2026, the Department of the Air Force expanded the South Texas National Defense Area (NDA-3) to reach Roma, Texas by covering approximately an additional 40 miles. It also established the Del Rio-Falcon National Defense Area (NDA-6), which covered approximately 150 miles of the border from Falcon Dam, Texas to Del Rio, Texas.

On February 26, 2026, the Texas Facilities Commission announced that work on the Texas Border Infrastructure Program had concluded with the installation of the last wall panel, for a total of 82.2 miles constructed. The first border wall panel was installed on December 18, 2021, on state-owned land. The Program's defunding in June 2025 and its eventual wind-down was due in part to the Trump Administration's renewed efforts at a federal level to complete the Border Wall.

On May 7, 2026, the federal government filed an eminent domain claim in the United States District Court of New Mexico. The border wall stops at the base of Mount Cristo Rey, site of a statue of Jesus, but the federal government argues the wall must be built across the mountain. United States Customs and Border Protection officials claimed an offer was made for the land but that the Catholic Church refuses to sell. The Diocese of Las Cruces asked a federal judge to stop the action, saying the site is sacred and a wall would block pilgrims from visiting.

In a May 2026 interview, Secretary of Homeland Security Markwayne Mullin stated that he expected the Primary Wall to be completed by April or June 2027, with the Secondary Wall and other components to be completed before Trump left office. In a June 11, 2026 interview, Customs and Border Protection (CBP) commissioner Rodney S. Scott stated that CBP was building about 6 miles of wall per week, that he made a commitment to President Trump that the Primary Wall would be completed by the end of 2027 and that the entire system would be completed by July 2028.

On June 16, 2026, the Tohono Oʼodham Nation sued the Department of Homeland Security to prevent construction of border wall on tribal lands along the United States-Mexico border. The first federal court hearing was held on July 22, 2026, in the United States District Court for the District of Columbia. On August 7, 2026, Tribal officials put the community on alert that federal contractors may attempt to enter the Nation's lands to begin construction work and posted "No Trespassing" signage. On August 14, 2026, Senior U.S. District Judge Richard J. Leon denied the Nation's request to block the federal government from starting construction on 62 miles of border wall across the tribe's reservation. Judge Leon's ruling held that the 60-foot strip of land at the border designated by President Theodore Roosevelt in 1907, known as the Roosevelt Reservation, constituted a public reservation and therefore permitted construction of the border wall. On August 25, 2026, CBP Commissioner Rodney S. Scott announced the project (Tucson 5 Wall Project) was moving forward. On August 26, 2026, tribal officials reported that armed United States Customs and Border Protection agents and border wall contractors entered tribal land to begin soil sampling and other pre-construction work. During proceedings, CBP informed the Court that construction would not likely begin until October 12, 2026. On August 26, 2026, the Nation filed notice for an expedited appeal with the Court, with first briefs due on September 16, 2026, and oral arguments in November 2026. On October 1, 2026, it was reported that CBP was seeking input from the community on its plan to build 62 miles of border barrier on the Tohono O'odham Nation's reservation in Pima County, Arizona through October 29, 2026. Per CBP, ~53 miles of vehicle barriers will be replaced with 30-foot-high pedestrian fencing and ~9 miles of new 30-foot-high pedestrian fencing will be constructed.

On June 22, 2026, it was reported that the Department of Homeland Security had removed a "BUILT THE WALL" World Cup meme which it had posted on social media after the United States' victory over Australia. The post contained a group photo of the United States men's national soccer team standing in front of a goal, with an inserted image of a border wall behind them and the caption "BUILT THE WALL".

In July 2026, Construction materials arrived at storage sites near Big Bend, Texas for the Big Bend Sector. Installation is scheduled to begin in August/September 2026. On July 31, 2026, Texas Land Commissioner Dawn Buckingham sent a cease and desist letter to United States Customs and Border Protection and contractor Barnard Construction upon discovering over a mile of state land near the Big Bend region had been cleared without state authorization. On August 2, 2026, a federal judge declined to block construction of border wall in the Big Bend area. The basis for U.S. District Judge Reggie B. Walton's ruling was that plaintiffs could not assert planned construction would violate a federal law since the Trump Administration is legally permitted to bypass the law at issue through waiver authority. On August 5, 2026, United States Customs and Border Protection confirmed that border construction work had begun in Big Bend. On August 17, 2026, CBP Commissioner Rodney S. Scott announced a temporary pause on construction activity to conduct an in-person evaluation and to hold conversations with stakeholders. It was later reported that the pause came at the request of Governor Greg Abbott. On August 18, 2026, CBP Commissioner Scott met with stakeholders and stated he would visit Big Bend Park on August 19, 2026, to compare their feedback with CBP's current build plan. On August 19, 2026, U.S. District Judge Orlando L. Garcia, of the United States District Court for the Western District of Texas, issued a temporary restraining order to pause construction on the Big Bend 2 Wall Project until an evidentiary hearing scheduled for August 28, 2026. Plaintiffs in the litigation include: Far Flung Outdoor Center; Christina Hernandez (Founder and Director of People of La Junta); and Andrew Austin. On August 28, 2026, it was reported following the hearing that the Federal government agreed to pause construction through September 15, 2026 while Judge Garcia adjudicates Plaintiffs' requests for a temporary restraining order on the Big Bend 2 Wall Project. On September 2, 2026, it was reported that some Texas lawmakers had confirmed that some of the construction projects were on hold until September 30, 2026. On September 14, 2026, Conserve Big Bend and a group of Big Bend landowners filed a lawsuit in the United States District Court for the District of Columbia asserting that the Department of Homeland Security cannot invoke expedited construction powers under Section 102 of the Illegal Immigration Reform and Immigrant Responsibility Act (IIRIRA), arguing the Big Bend Sector would not meet the necessary legal standard of being a "high illegal entry" area. On September 17, 2026, it was reported that construction on the Big Bend 1 Wall Project had begun with CBP stating that the first wall panels were erected on September 15, 2026. On September 30, 2026, it was reported that CBP was considering scaling back its planned Border Wall project through Big Bend National Park, with CBP expected to make its final decision during the first week of October 2026. On October 2, 2026, United States District Judge Kathleen Cardone granted a request for an injunction from the Center for Biological Diversity and other plaintiffs to stop border wall construction for the entire Big Bend Sector within 1 mile of the Rio Grande and within the state and national parks. Construction will be paused until a decision is made on the case. On October 9, 2026, it was reported that the Trump Administration filed a motion asking Judge Cardone to suspend her previous order while it seeks Supreme Court review of what it considered to be an "unprecedented" preliminary injunction. In its filing, CBP claimed it would incur costs of at least $462,800 per day due to the pause, and that it would also cost $7 million to pull out workers/equipment and then return them across its five Big Bend Smart Wall projects.. On October 21, 2026, the Trump Administration filed an emergency appeal to the Supreme Court of the United States, asking the Court to lift Judge Cardone's decision. The filing was received by Justice Samuel Alito. In its filing, the Trump Administration maintained the District Court should not have heard challenger's claim under the major questions doctrine given that challengers specifically argued the DHS secretary lacked congressional authorization to issue waivers under IIRIRA. As such, the Trump Administration asserted that because challenger's claim was that an Executive Branch official had acted in excess of his statutory authority, it was not a claim alleging a violation of the constitution, and IIRIRA as passed by congress stated waivers are only subject to constitutional challenges. In the alternative, the Trump Administration asserted that if a major question was implicated that Congress had authorized Secretary Mullin to construct border barriers and waive legal requirements to expedite construction. On November 9, 2026 it was reported that the Supreme Court of the United States granted President Trump's emergency appeal to resume construction on Big Bend border barriers in an unsigned opinion, with Justice Ketanji Brown Jackson dissenting but not providing an explanation.

On August 3, 2026, the Trump Administration ordered crews constructing border wall in New Mexico to stop drilling new wells for pumping groundwater due to drought and the potential impact on livestock. Construction crews are using water to make concrete for roads and wall construction, as well as for dust suppression. On August 3, 2026, the New Mexico Office of the State Engineer issued "Notices of Violation" to two federal subcontractors, alleging that they had drilled multiple unauthorized wells. On October 2, 2026 it was published in the Federal Register that DHS secretary Markwayne Mullin had signed a waiver for multiple federal and New Mexico state laws and regulations pursuant to Section 102 of the Illegal Immigration Reform and Immigrant Responsibility Act of 1996 to expedite construction of border barrier and roads.

On September 1, 2026, the Smart Wall Map page was updated with "Project Overview" charts that listed each Smart Wall "Project Name" and specified the planned barrier type/mileage construction by applicable state (California, Arizona, New Mexico, Texas) and border sector.

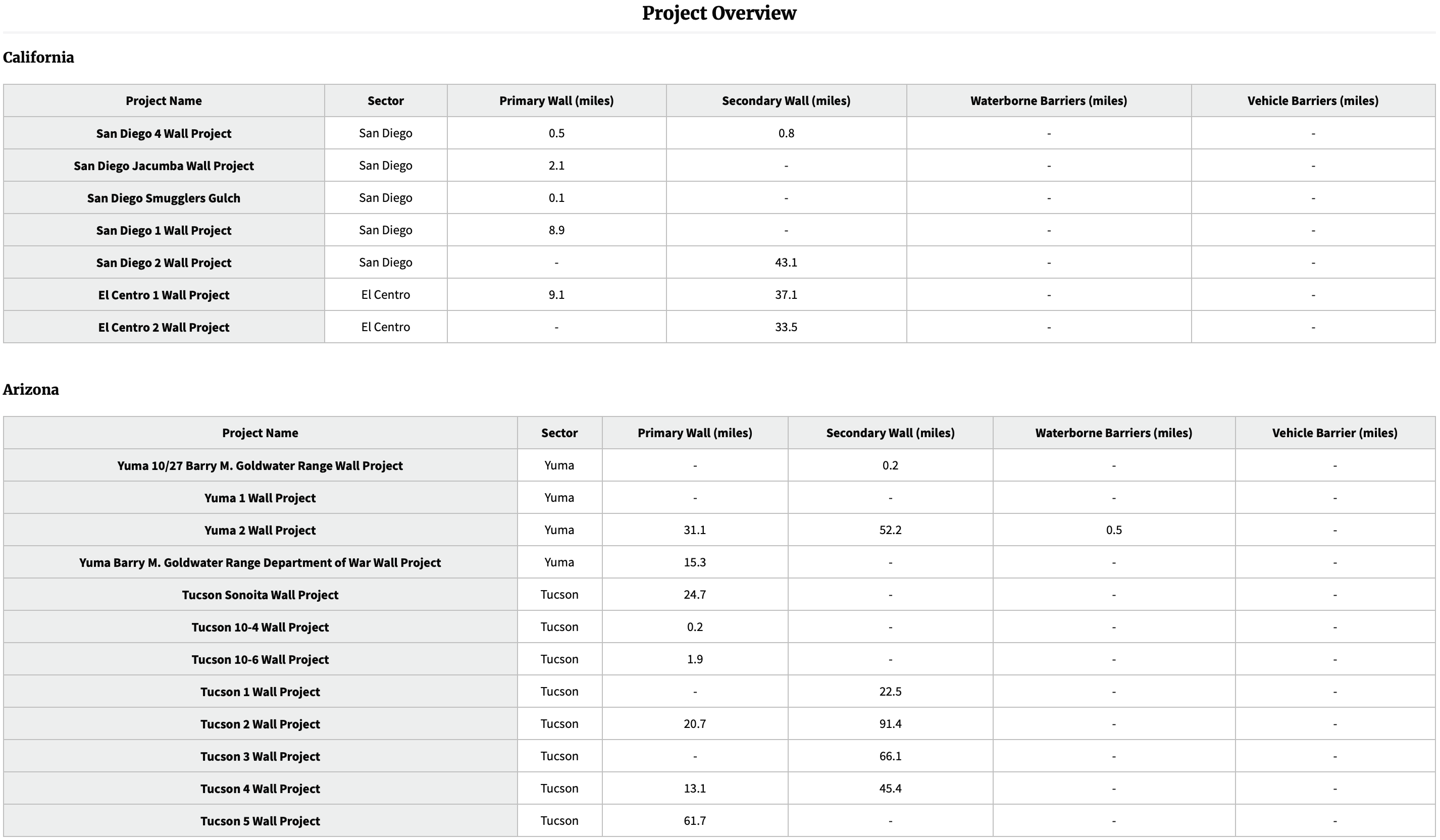
United States Customs and Border Protection - Smart Wall - Project Overview: California + Arizona (September 1, 2026).

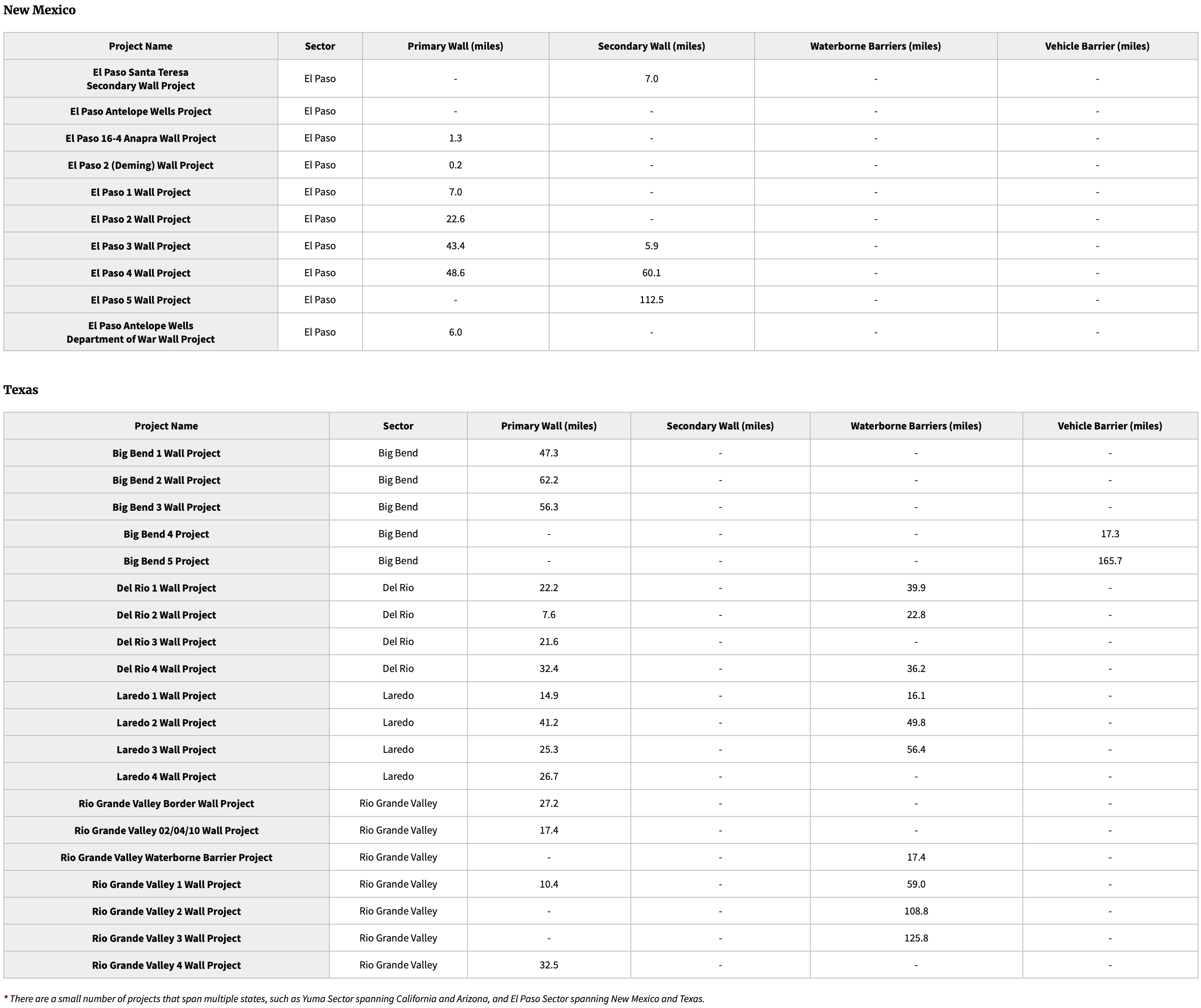
United States Customs and Border Protection - Smart Wall - Project Overview: New Mexico + Texas (September 1, 2026).

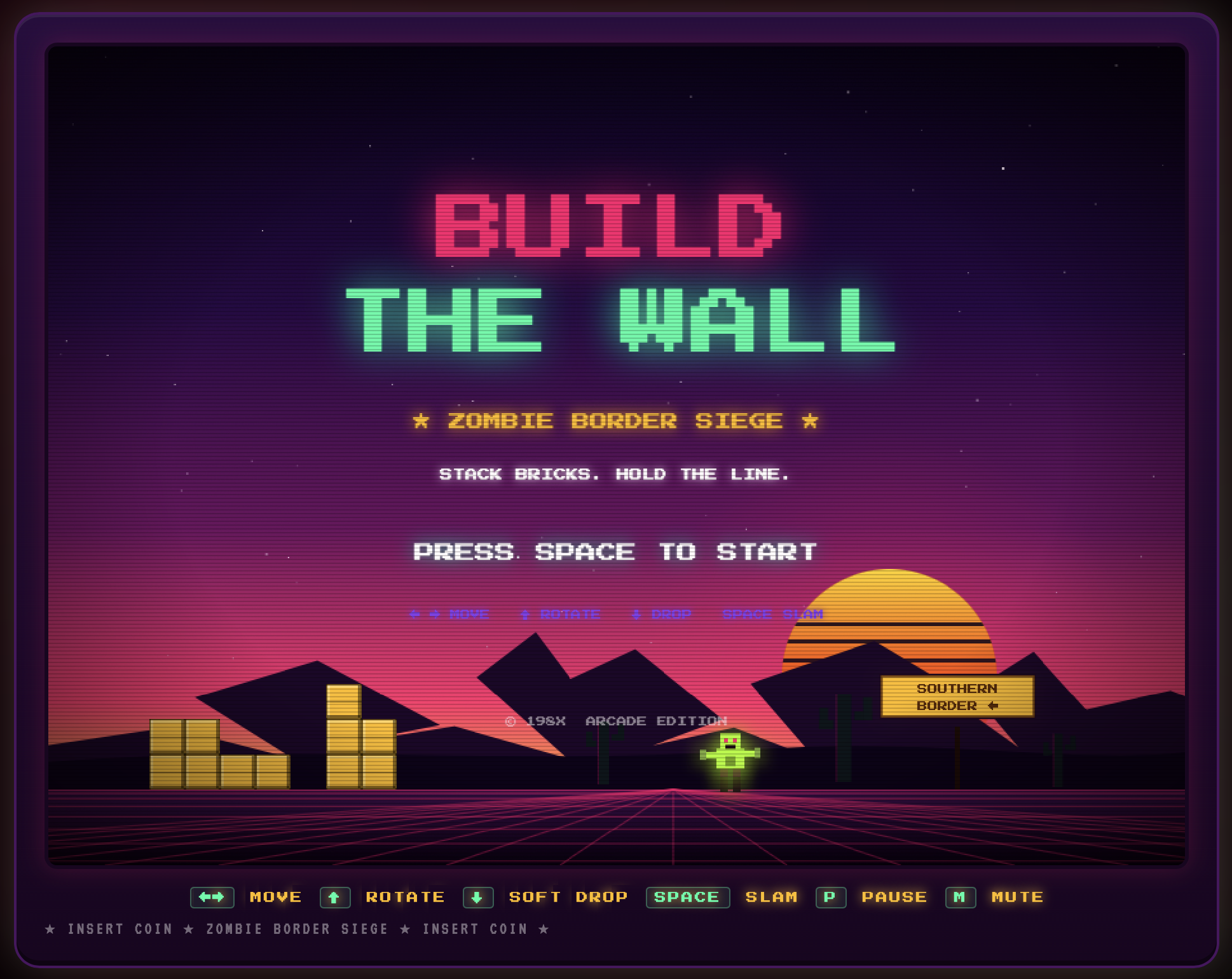
BUILD THE WALL: A Tetris-style block-stacking game focused on border security, released by The White House on September 3, 2026. On September 8, 2026, it was reported that the Trump Administration had removed the game from the Arcade.

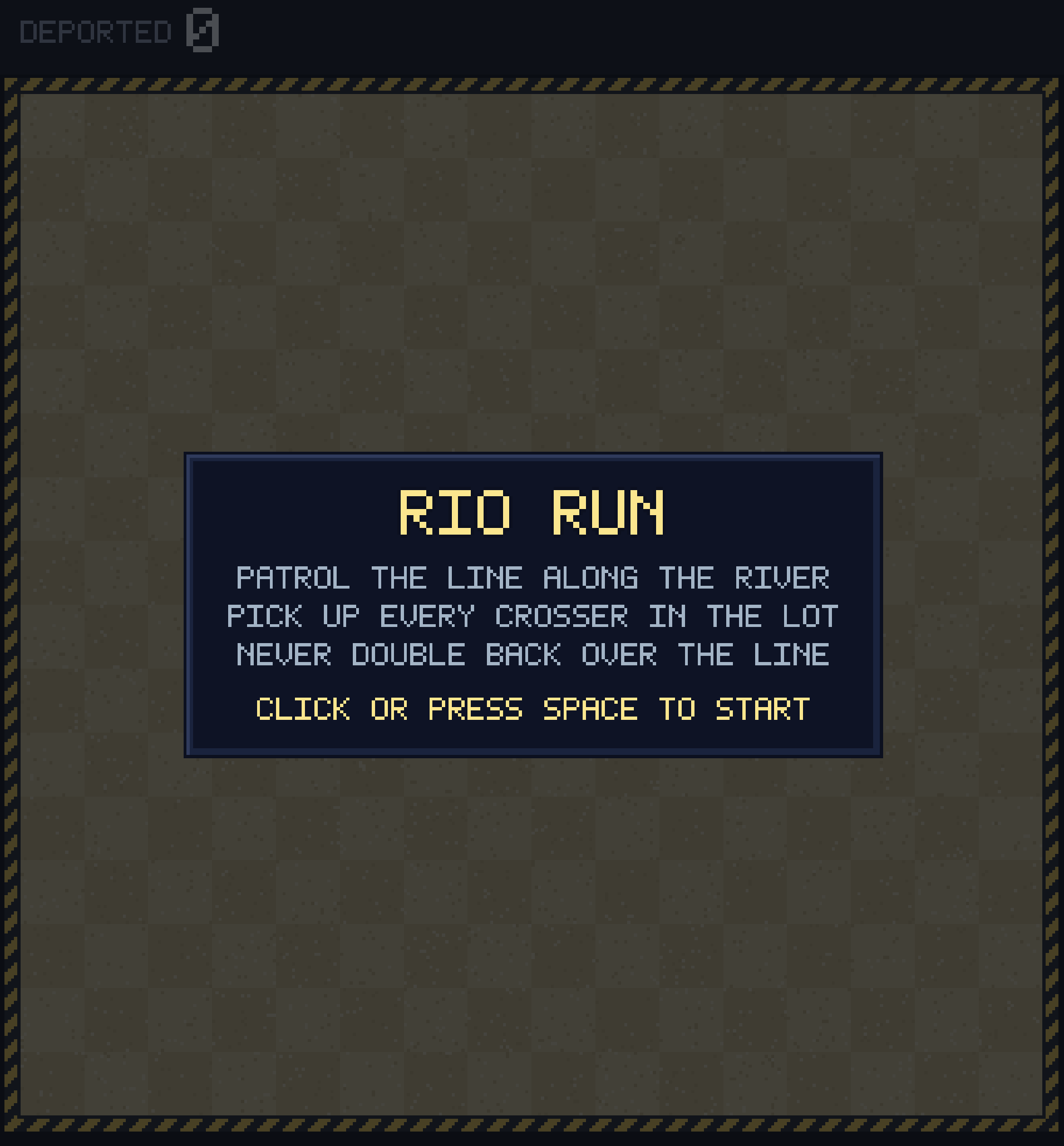
RIO RUN: A Snake-style game focused on border security, released by The White House on September 3, 2026.

Smart Wall Construction Status Chart (September 16, 2026).

On September 3, 2026, the Trump Administration announced the launch of Arcade.gov, which redirected to a page on The White House website. This page contained a number of retro-styled video games which focused on the Trump Administration's policies. Of the five games released at launch, two games focused on border security:

- "BUILD THE WALL": a Tetris-style block stacking game, for which the caption says "Protect the border from the coming horde" and the in-game text says "*ZOMBIE BORDER SIEGE*" and "STACK BRICKS. HOLD THE LINE.";
- "RIO RUN": a Snake-style game, for which the caption says "Border patrol along the Rio Grande" and the in-game text says "PATROL THE LINE ALONG THE RIVER - PICK UP EVERY CROSSER IN THE LOT - NEVER DOUBLE BACK OVER THE LINE".

On September 4, 2026, The Tetris Company issued a public response to disassociate itself from the creation of "BUILD THE WALL" and also stated that it was reviewing the matter for potential violation of copyright. On September 8, 2026, it was reported that the Trump Administration removed "BUILD THE WALL" from the Arcade.

On September 6, 2026, the Trump Administration posted an AI video of President Trump portrayed as Green Lantern, utilizing the character's glowing ring to construct a border wall.

A United States Army soldier with 591st Combat Engineer Company-Infantry, 62nd Engineer Battalion, 36th Engineer Brigade, assigned to Joint Task Force-Southern Border (JTF-SB) in support of Operation Ardent Vanguard, conducts security during barrier reinforcement operations along the southern border near Santa Teresa, New Mexico (September 17, 2026).

On September 18, 2026, it was reported that CBP was constructing an average of 12 miles of barrier per week, which is double the pace of barrier construction that CBP commissioner Rodney S. Scott had previously stated in a June 11, 2026 interview.

On September 18, 2026, Governor Greg Abbott announced that Texas would receive $7.5 Billion in funding from the Department of Homeland Security to reimburse the state for its border security expenditures during the Biden Administration, which included the construction of 82.2 miles of border barrier on state-owned land. Governor Abbott also announced that Texas would also apply for a portion of an additional $3 Billion in funding from the Department of Justice to cover additional immigration-related costs it incurred during the Biden Administration.

On October 1, 2026, it was reported that CBP was seeking input from the community on its plan to build 62 miles of border barrier on the Tohono O'odham Nation's reservation in Pima County, Arizona through October 29, 2026. Per CBP, ~53 miles of vehicle barriers will be replaced with 30-foot-high pedestrian fencing and ~9 miles of new 30-foot-high pedestrian fencing will also be constructed.

In an October 20, 2026 interview, DHS secretary Markwayne Mullin stated that CBP was purchasing and installing new technology for the wall at a record pace, and although construction had been slightly slowed by lawsuits from environmental groups and land disputes, the Primary Wall would be finished in 2027.

On November 17, 2026, a CBP spokesperson stated that construction is steadily advancing toward its targets with primary border wall completion projected for January 2028, while Axios published an estimate that the primary wall wouldn't be completed until late 2029, well after President Trump leaves office. In a statement to The Independent, a CBP spokesperson disclosed that all Southwest border construction contracts had been awarded by June 30, 2026, following funding from the Working Families Tax Cut Act, and that large infrastructure projects ramp to build momentum and pace as individual projects transition from design phase to construction phase.

== Concerns and impacts ==
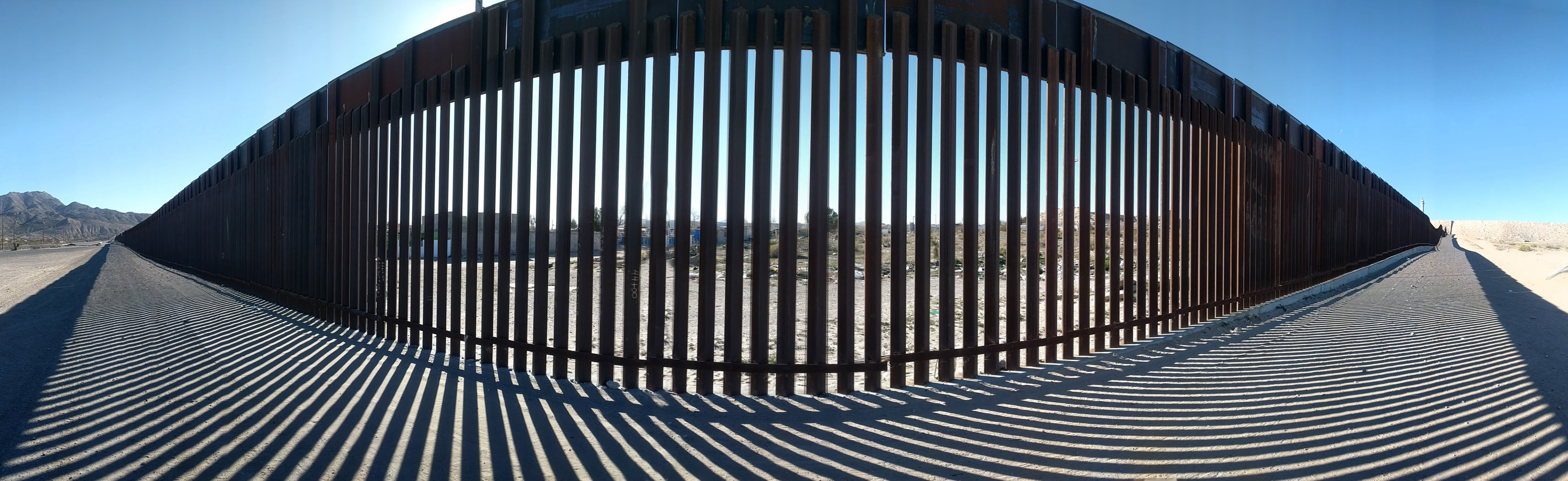
This 2017 fence upgrade at Anapra was planned by the Obama administration.

=== Effectiveness ===
Different sources draw different conclusions about the actual or likely effectiveness of the wall. Experts on the subject have said that aside from the human crossings, drugs, among other things, will still be making their way to the United States illegally. U.S. Customs and Border Protection has frequently called for more physical barriers on the Mexico–United States border, citing their efficacy. However, research at Texas A&M University and Texas Tech University indicated that the wall, and border walls in general, are unlikely to be effective at reducing illegal immigration or movement of contraband. By contrast, the American Economic Journal found that wall construction caused a 15–35% reduction in migration, varying with proximity to the barrier.

Critics of Trump's plan note that expanding the wall would not stop the routine misuse of legal ports of entry by people smuggling contraband, overstaying travel visas, using fraudulent documents, or stowing away. They also point out that in addition to the misuse of ports of entry, even a border-wide wall could be bypassed by tunneling, climbing, or by using boats or aircraft. Additionally, along some parts of the border, the existing rough terrain may be a greater deterrent than a wall. Trump reportedly suggested fortifying the wall with a water-filled trench inhabited by snakes or alligators, and electric fencing topped with spikes that can pierce human flesh. (Note: In May 2011, after announcing that the planned border fence was "basically complete", President Barack Obama stated, We have gone above and beyond what was requested by the very Republicans who said they supported broader reform as long as we got serious about enforcement. All the stuff they asked for, we've done. But ... I suspect there are still going to be some who are trying to move the goal posts on us one more time. They'll want a higher fence. Maybe they'll need a moat. Maybe they want alligators in the moat. They'll never be satisfied. And I understand that. That's politics.) The U.S. Customs and Border Protection agency has frequently called for more physical barriers, citing their efficacy. "I started in the San Diego sector in 1992, and it didn't matter how many agents we lined up," said Chief Patrol Agent Rodney Scott. "We could not make a measurable impact on the flow [of undocumented immigrants] across the border. It wasn't until we installed barriers along the border that gave us the upper hand that we started to get control." Carla Provost, the chief of U.S. border patrol, stated "We already have many miles, over 600 miles (970 km) of barrier along the border. I have been in locations where there was no barrier, and then I was there when we put it up. It certainly helps. It's not a be-all end-all. It's a part of a system. We need the technology, we need that infrastructure."

Over the wall's first three years, Mexican smugglers sawed through the wall multiple times per day, usually with ordinary power tools, according to maintenance records from U.S. Customs and Border Protection. The Washington Post reported "891 breaches during fiscal 2019, 906 during fiscal 2020, and 1,475 during fiscal 2021." The government patched these holes, spending approximately $800 per incident and often leaving visible evidence of the repair. One early report of this damage was in November 2019. People were sawing through steel bollards in areas where sensors to detect such breaches had not yet been installed. Though Trump claimed it was "very easily fixed" by "put[ting] the chunk back in", border agents argued that smugglers tend to return to previously sawed wall because the bollards are weakened.

In October 2020, the DHS published data indicating that the new border barrier has been effective at reducing the number of illegal border entries. The barrier also reduced ongoing manpower costs in at least one area in which it had been built.

=== Divided Indigenous land ===
Tribal lands of three American Indian reservations are divided by a proposed border fence.

On January 27, 2008, a Native American (Indian) human rights delegation in the United States, which included Margo Tamez (Lipan Apache-Jumano Apache) and Teresa Leal (Opata-Mayo) reported the removal of the official International Boundary obelisks of 1848 by the U.S. Department of Homeland Security in the Las Mariposas, Sonora-Arizona sector of the Mexico–U.S. border. The obelisks were moved southward approximately 20 m (70 ft), onto the property of private landowners in Sonora, as part of the larger project of installing the 18-foot (5.5 m) steel barrier wall.

The proposed route for the border fence would divide the campus of the University of Texas at Brownsville into two parts, according to Antonio N. Zavaleta, a vice president of the university. There have been campus protests against the wall by students who feel it will harm their school. In August 2008, UT-Brownsville reached an agreement with the U.S. Department of Homeland Security for the university to construct a portion of the fence across and adjacent to its property. On August 20, 2008, the university sent out a request for bids for the construction of a 10-foot (3.0 m) high barrier that incorporates technology security for its segment of the border fence project. The southern perimeter of the UT-Brownsville campus will be part of a laboratory for testing new security technology and infrastructure combinations. The border fence segment on the campus was substantially completed by December 2008.

The SpaceX South Texas launch site was shown on a map of the Department of Homeland Security with the barrier cutting through the 50-acre facility (20 ha) in Boca Chica, Texas.

In June 2026, the Tohono O'odham Nation sued the Department of Homeland Security to prevent construction of border wall on tribal lands along the United States-Mexico border. The first federal court hearing was held on July 22, 2026, in the United States District Court for the District of Columbia. On August 7, 2026, Tribal officials put the community on alert that federal contractors may attempt to enter the Nation's lands to begin construction work and posted "No Trespassing" signage. On August 14, 2026, Senior U.S. District Judge Richard J. Leon denied the Nation's request to block the federal government from starting construction on 62 miles of border wall across the tribe's reservation. Judge Leon's ruling held that the 60-foot strip of land at the border designated by President Theodore Roosevelt in 1907, known as the Roosevelt Reservation, constituted a public reservation and therefore permitted construction of the border wall. On August 25, 2026, CBP Commissioner Rodney S. Scott announced the project (Tucson 5 Wall Project) was moving forward. On August 26, 2026, tribal officials described how armed United States Customs and Border Protection agents and border wall contractors entered tribal land to begin soil sampling and other pre-construction work. During proceedings, CBP informed the Court that construction would not likely begin until October 12, 2026. On August 26, 2026, the Nation filed notice for an expedited appeal with the Court, with first briefs due on September 16, 2026, and oral arguments in November 2026. On October 1, 2026, it was reported that CBP was seeking input from the community on its plan to build 62 miles of border barrier on the Tohono O'odham Nation's reservation in Pima County, Arizona through October 29, 2026. Per CBP, ~53 miles of vehicle barriers will be replaced with 30-foot-high pedestrian fencing and ~9 miles of new 30-foot-high pedestrian fencing will also be constructed.

=== Santa Ana National Wildlife Refuge ===
On August 1, 2018, the chief of the Border Patrol's Rio Grande Valley sector indicated that although Starr County was his priority for a wall, Hidalgo County's Santa Ana National Wildlife Refuge had been selected instead for initial construction, because its land was owned by the government.

In June 2026, updated maps released by United States Customs and Border Protection showed border wall through the Refuge. It was also announced that the Levee hike and bike trail would be closed for the duration of construction (July 2026 - September 2027).

On July 30, 2026, Judge Nereida Lopez-Singleterry Nereida (476th District Court) issued a temporary restraining order against Spencer Construction, LLC and Royal Concrete Products, LLC. On August 12, 2026, the case was moved from state court to the United States District Court for the Southern District of Texas as the defendants are contractors acting on behalf of a U.S. Government Agency building the border wall. On August 13, 2026, U.S. District Judge Arthur Robert Jones upheld and extended the temporary restraining order issued against the defendants, which resulted in a pause on construction until August 27, 2026. At a Preliminary Hearing on August 17, 2026, U.S. Magistrate Judge Juan Alanis of the U.S. District Court for the Southern District of Texas continued the temporary restraining order which paused border wall construction. The next hearing for the case was also scheduled for August 26, 2026. On August 28, 2026, it was reported that Judge Alanis extended the temporary restraining order through September 10, 2026. On September 10, 2026, Judge Alanis issued a recommendation to Judge Jones, who is handling the case, to keep border wall construction paused until trespassing claims against the federal government's contractors are resolved. Judge Jones has the option to accept or reject this recommendation.

=== National Butterfly Center ===
The proposed border wall has been described as a "death sentence" for the American National Butterfly Center, a privately operated outdoor butterfly conservatory that maintains a significant amount of land north of the Rio Grande, but south of the wall's route. Filmmaker Krista Schlyer, part of an all-woman team creating a documentary film about the butterflies and the border wall, Ay Mariposa, estimates that construction would put 70% of the preserve habitat on the Mexican side of the border fence. In addition to concerns about seizure of private property by the federal government, center employees have also noted the local economic impact. The center's director has stated that "environmental tourism contributes more than $450m to Hidalgo and Starr counties."

In early December 2018, a challenge to wall construction at the National Butterfly Center was rejected by the U.S. Supreme Court. According to the San Antonio Express-News, "the high court let stand an appeals ruling that lets the administration bypass 28 federal laws", including the Endangered Species Act, the Safe Drinking Water Act, and the Native American Graves Protection and Repatriation Act. Despite this, in 2019 Congress amended an existing appropriations bill, prohibiting new funding from being used in border wall construction at the center. Following this, Trump declared a National Emergency Concerning the Southern Border of the United States, which put into question the future of the center. But then on May 24, 2019, a federal judge blocked the Trump administration's plan to divert funds not explicitly appropriated by Congress, which impeded further construction.

On February 13, 2026, the center was made aware by U.S. Customs and Border Protection that they were planning to access the property to build border wall through Hidalgo County, offering $1,000 as a right or entry. The agency also claimed to be able to take the property via eminent domain, in accordance with the Federal Declaration of Taking Act of 1931 if the offer is refused.

=== Mexico–U.S. relations ===
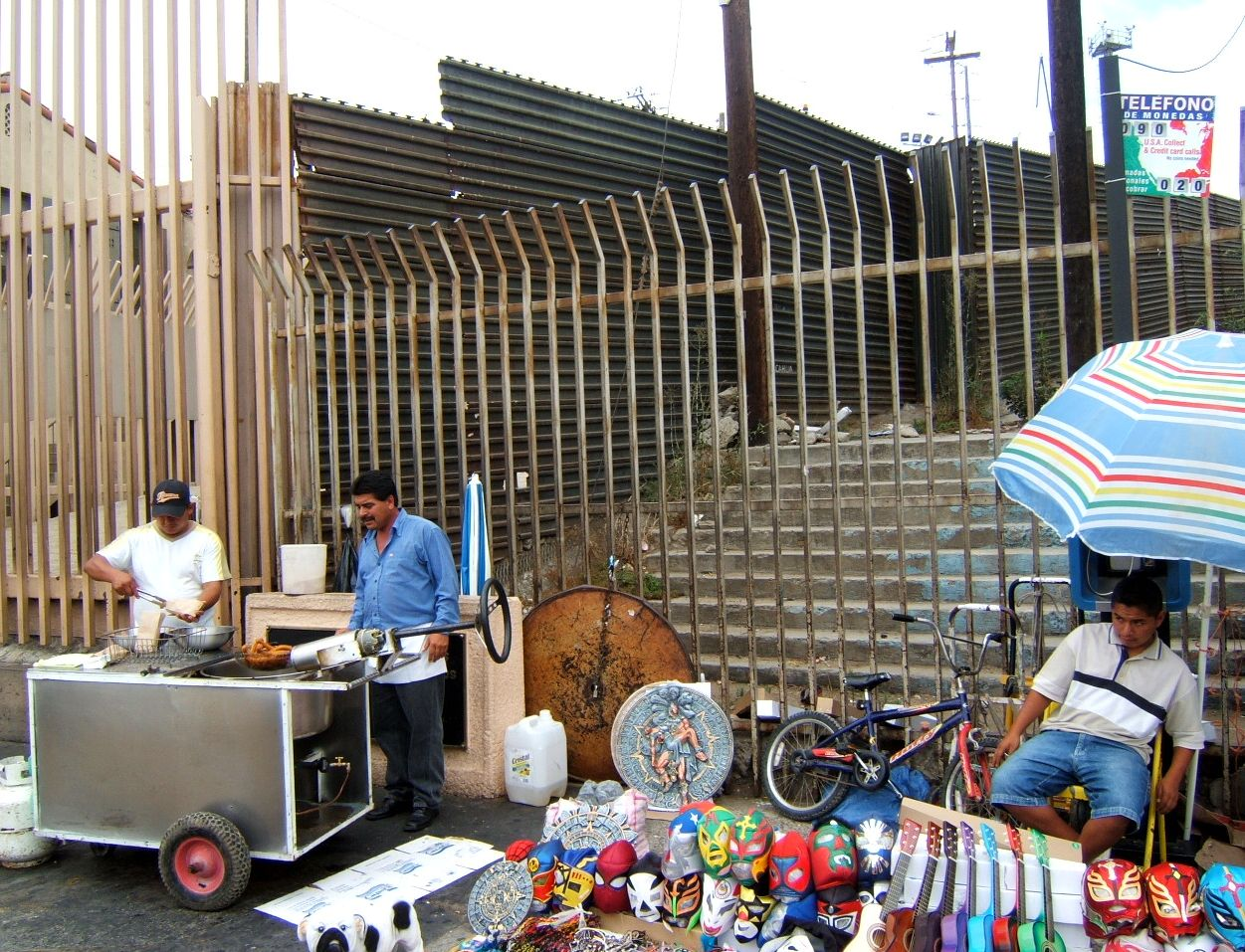
Mexico–United States barrier at the pedestrian border crossing in Tijuana

In 2006, the Mexican government vigorously condemned the Secure Fence Act of 2006. Mexico has also urged the U.S. to alter its plans for expanded fences along their shared border, saying that it would damage the environment and harm wildlife.

In 2012, Mexican presidential candidate Enrique Peña Nieto campaigned at the Plaza Monumental de Tijuana, less than 600 yards (550 m) from the U.S.–Mexico border adjacent to Border Field State Park. In one of his speeches, he criticized the U.S. government for building the barriers and asked for them to be removed, referencing President Ronald Reagan's "Tear down this wall!" speech from Berlin in 1987.

In January 2017, President Donald Trump's signing of his Executive Order 13767 soured relations between the U.S. and Mexico. Mexican president Peña Nieto addressed Mexican citizens via a recorded message, in which he condemned the executive order and again said Mexico would not pay for the wall's construction. Following a Twitter feud between the two leaders in which Trump threatened to cancel a planned meeting with Peña Nieto in Washington, Peña Nieto decided to cancel the meeting himself. At the same time, while addressing supporters, Mexican opposition politician Andrés Manuel López Obrador condemned the wall order as an insult to Mexico and demanded the Mexican government pursue claims against the American government in the United Nations.

In March 2017, Mexican congressman Braulio Guerra of Querétaro illegally climbed, and partially crossed, an existing 30-foot (9.1 m) border fence on American soil dividing San Diego and Tijuana, saying that more walls would be ineffective. (Note: In a video he can be heard to say: "I was able to scale it, climb it, and sit myself right here. It would be simple for me to jump into the United States, which shows that it is unnecessary and totally absurd to build a wall. It's easy, and it shows how unnecessary this project, this political rhetoric from Donald Trump, is".)

The Roman Catholic archbishop of Mexico opposed the border wall, and wrote that any Mexican company that participates in construction of the wall or supplies materials for construction would be committing "treason against the homeland".

=== Other international reactions ===
At the annual summit of the Community of Latin American and Caribbean States in January 2017, representatives from Latin American and Caribbean countries condemned the wall proposal.

Israeli prime minister Benjamin Netanyahu applauded the plan, calling it a "Great idea." Netanyahu said "Trump is right" and likened the proposal to the Israeli West Bank barrier. After Mexican protests, the prime minister's office issued a statement saying that "[he] was addressing Israel's unique circumstances and the important experience we have and which we are willing to share with other nations. There was no attempt to voice an opinion regarding U.S.–Mexico ties."

Pope Francis was critical of the project, saying in a March 2019 interview: "If you raise a wall between people, you end up a prisoner of that wall that you raised." During his tenure he made references in several speeches, and in a tweet, to building "bridges, not walls".

In February 2022, the Dominican Republic began building its own border wall along the frontier with Haiti under President Luis Abinader who based the idea off from Trump's border wall. Abinader inaugurated construction on 20 February 2022, with him and his supporters stating the barrier would help control bilateral trade and regulate migration, and combat people smuggling, drug trafficking and illegal arms sales. The four-metre-high concrete wall was planned to cover the most sensitive half of the 244 mi (393 km) border, with 70 watchtowers and 41 access gates, at a projected cost of over $30 million. Human rights groups on the other hand, protested that the wall would increase tension between the two countries.

International reactions include artistic and intercultural facilitation devices. Projects have included exhibitions, signs, and demonstrations as well as physical adaptations promoting socialization, such as a bright pink see-saw built through the wall that is accessible to people on both sides to enjoy together.

=== Migrant deaths ===
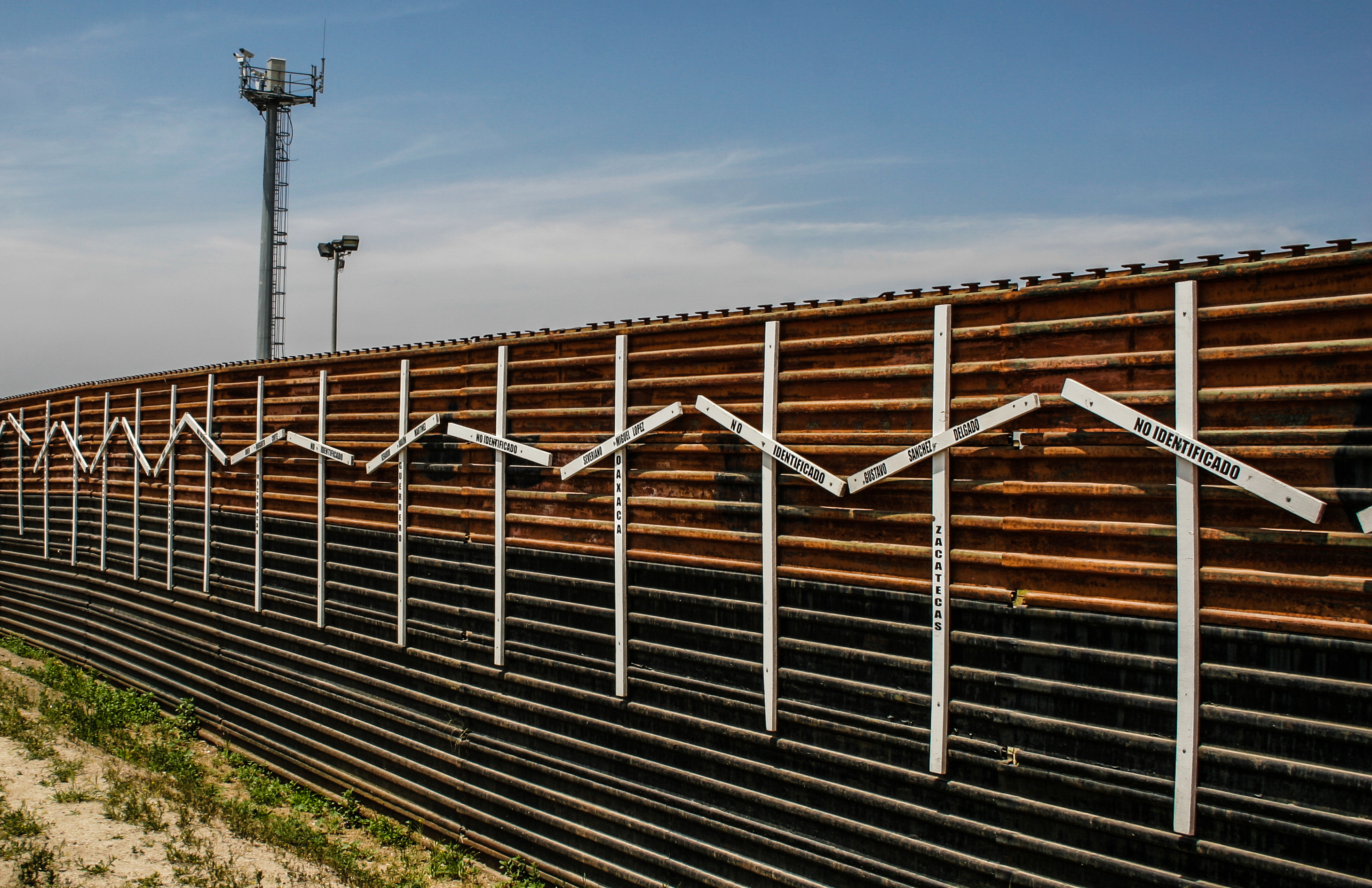
The wall at the border of Tijuana, Mexico, and San Diego; the crosses represent migrants who have died in crossing attempts.

Between 1994 and 2007, there were around 5,000 migrant deaths along the Mexico–United States border according to a document created by the Human Rights National Commission of Mexico and signed by the American Civil Liberties Union. An April 2021 report by the University of Arizona's Binational Migration Institute said the remains of 3,356 migrants were found in Southern Arizona between 1990 and 2020.

Between 43 and 61 people died trying to cross the Sonoran Desert from October 2003 to May 2004, three times as of the same period the previous year. In October 2004, the Border Patrol announced that 325 people had died crossing the entire border during the previous 12 months.

U.S. Border Patrol Tucson Sector reported on October 15, 2008, that its agents were able to save 443 illegal immigrants from certain death after being abandoned by their smugglers. The agents also reduced the number of deaths by 17%: from 202 in 2007 to 167 in 2008. Without the efforts of these agents, hundreds more could have died in the deserts of Arizona. According to the same sector, border enhancements like the wall have allowed the Tucson Sector agents to reduce the number of apprehensions at the borders by 16% compared with 2007.

=== Environmental impact ===
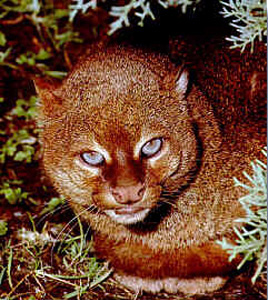
The Gulf Coast jaguarundi is already threatened by extirpation.

In April 2008, the Department of Homeland Security announced plans to waive more than 30 environmental and cultural laws to speed construction of the barrier. Despite claims from then Homeland Security Chief Michael Chertoff that the department would minimize the construction's impact on the environment, critics in Arizona, New Mexico, and Texas, asserted that the fence endangered species and fragile ecosystems along the Rio Grande. Environmentalists expressed concern about butterfly migration corridors and the future of species of local wildcats, the ocelot, the jaguarundi, and the jaguar.

By August 2008, more than 90% of the southern border in Arizona and New Mexico had been surveyed. In addition, 80% of the California–Mexico border has been surveyed. About 100 species of plants and animals, many already endangered, are threatened by the wall, including the jaguar, ocelot, Sonoran pronghorn, Mexican wolf, a pygmy owl, the thick-billed parrot, and the Quino checkerspot butterfly. According to Scott Egan of Rice University, a wall can create a population bottleneck, increase inbreeding, and cut off natural migration routes and range expansion.

In 2008, a resolution "based on sound and accurate scientific knowledge" expressing opposition to the wall and the harmful impact on several rare, threatened, and endangered species, particularly endangered mammals such as the jaguar, ocelot, jaguarondi, and Sonoran pronghorn, was published by The Southwestern Association of Naturalists, an organization of 791 scientists specializing in the zoology, botany, and ecology of southwestern United States and Mexico. A decade later, in 2018, well over 2500 scientists from 43 countries published a statement opposing the Border Wall, affirming it will have "significant consequences for biodiversity" and "Already-built sections of the wall are reducing the area, quality, and connectivity of plant and animal habitats and are compromising more than a century of binational investment in conservation."

An initial 75-mile (121 km) wall for which U.S. funding has been requested on the nearly 2,000-mile (3,200 km) border would pass through the Tijuana Slough National Wildlife Refuge in California, the Santa Ana National Wildlife Refuge and Lower Rio Grande Valley National Wildlife Refuge in Texas, Arizona's Cabeza Prieta National Wildlife Refuge and Mexico's El Pinacate y Gran Desierto de Altar Biosphere Reserve, a UNESCO World Heritage Site that the U.S. is bound by global treaty to protect. The U.S. Customs and Border Protection plan to build the wall using the Real ID Act to avoid the process of making environmental impact statements, a strategy devised by Chertoff during the Bush administration. Reuters said, "The Real ID Act also allows the Secretary of Homeland Security to exempt CBP from adhering to the Endangered Species Act", which would otherwise prohibit construction in a wildlife refuge.

In July 2026, over 30 federal laws were waived to construct floating barriers in the Rio Grande in Cameron County, including the National Environmental Policy Act, the Endangered Species Act, the Migratory Bird Conservation Act, and the Safe Drinking Water Act.

On August 3, 2026, the Trump Administration ordered crews constructing border wall in New Mexico to stop drilling new wells for pumping groundwater due to drought and the potential impact on livestock. Construction crews are using water to make concrete for roads and wall construction, as well as for dust suppression. On August 3, 2026, the New Mexico Office of the State Engineer issued "Notices of Violation" to two federal subcontractors, alleging that they had drilled multiple unauthorized wells. On October 2, 2026 it was published in the Federal Register that the DHS secretary Markwayne Mullin had signed a waiver for multiple federal and New Mexico state laws and regulations pursuant to Section 102 of the Illegal Immigration Reform and Immigrant Responsibility Act of 1996 to expedite construction of border barrier and roads.

On September 5, 2026, it was reported that the UNESCO World Heritage Committee had issued a judgment instructing Mexico to organize a joint reactive monitoring mission which would assess the harm and disruption caused by the border wall to the Organ Pipe Cactus National Monument and Cabeza Prieta National Wildlife Refuge.

On October 5, 2026, it was reported that 10 individuals protesting construction associated with the “Tucson 2 Wall Project” in Lochiel, Arizona had been arrested. A number of these individuals had spent the last 70 days attempting to protect a grove of four "Grandmother" Cottonwood Trees, with the encampment forming after contractors from Fisher Sand & Gravel had felled three of the trees. The fourth tree was felled on October 5, 2026. Protests continue to be held at the site. On October 13, 2026, it was reported that the encampment had been shut down and cleaned up by the organizers. Environmental advocates gathered pieces of the Cottonwood Trees and have been able to grow cuttings for future planting.

== Legal aspects ==
On September 12, 2017, the United States Department of Homeland Security issued a notice that Acting Secretary of Homeland Security Elaine Duke would be waiving "certain laws, regulations, and other legal requirements" to begin construction of the new wall near Calexico, California. The waiver allows the Department of Homeland Security to bypass the National Environmental Policy Act, the Endangered Species Act, the Clean Water Act, the Clean Air Act, the National Historic Preservation Act, the Migratory Bird Treaty Act, the Migratory Bird Conservation Act, the Archaeological Resources Protection Act, the Safe Drinking Water Act, the Noise Control Act, the Solid Waste Disposal Act, the Antiquities Act, the Federal Land Policy and Management Act, the Administrative Procedure Act, the Native American Graves Protection and Repatriation Act, and the American Indian Religious Freedom Act.

In 2020, two contractors who were employed by Sullivan Land Services Co. to provide security for wall construction filed a federal complaint alleging that the company and a subcontractor had performed illegal acts such as hiring undocumented workers, going "so far as to build a dirt road to expedite illegal border crossings to sites in San Diego, using construction vehicles to block security cameras", which was approved by an "unnamed supervisor at the Army Corps of Engineers".

=== Appropriations challenge ===
Following Trump's executive order to proceed with the wall's construction in February 2019, two separate cases were filed in the United States District Court of the Northern District of California alleging that the Trump administration had overstepped its boundaries by authorizing funds to use to build the border wall without Congressional approval, citing the Congressional restrictions they had passed earlier in the month. One was filed by the state of California and 19 other states, while the other was filed by the American Civil Liberties Union for the Sierra Club and the Southern Border Communities Coalition. Both cases were heard together by Judge Haywood Gilliam.

On May 17, 2019, the U.S. Department of Justice argued in court that, because Congress had not explicitly stated in an appropriations bill that "no money shall be obligated" for construction of the wall, the administration was free to spend funds that were not expressly appropriated for border security. Douglas Letter, the general counsel for the House of Representatives, responded, "That just cannot be right. No money may be spent unless Congress actually appropriates it." On the following week, Gilliam granted a preliminary injunction preventing the Trump administration from redirecting funds under the national emergency declaration issued earlier in the year to fund a planned wall along the border with Mexico. Gilliam ruled that "Congress's 'absolute' control over federal expenditures – even when that control may frustrate the desires of the Executive Branch regarding initiatives it views as important – is not a bug in our constitutional system. It is a feature of that system, and an essential one." The injunction applied specifically to some of the money the administration intended to allocate from other agencies, and limited wall construction projects in El Paso, Texas and Yuma, Arizona. Gilliam's decision was temporarily upheld on appeal to the Ninth Circuit Court on July 3, 2019.

The U.S. Department of Justice petitioned the Supreme Court, and on July 26, 2019, the Supreme Court, in a 5–4 decision, issued a stay to Gilliam's ruling, allowing wall and related construction to proceed while litigation continues. The summary ruling from the majority indicated the groups suing the government may not have standing to challenge the executive order. However, the plaintiffs will return to the Ninth Circuit Appeals Court. Rulings for both the states' and the environmental groups' cases were issued on June 26, 2020, with the Ninth Circuit affirming that the funds for constructing the wall were transferred illegally against the Appropriations Clause.

The parties in the Sierra Club suit sought to have the Supreme Court lift their stay based on the Ninth's decision, but the Supreme Court refused to grant this on a 5–4 order on July 31, 2020, effectively allowing the wall construction to continue despite the decision of the Ninth; Justices Ginsburg, Breyer, Kagan, and Sotomayor dissented. On August 7, 2020, the U.S. Department of Justice petitioned the Supreme Court challenging the Ninth Circuit's ruling in both the California and Sierra Club cases on the questions of standing and the legality of the appropriations transfer. On October 19, 2020, the Supreme Court announced that it would hear the case.

The House of Representatives also filed suit in the U.S. District Court for the District of Columbia against the administration in 2019 for misappropriation of funds. U.S. district judge Trevor N. McFadden dismissed the lawsuit in June 2019, determining the House could not show damages and thus had no standing to sue. On appeal, a unanimous panel of the U.S. Court of Appeals for the District of Columbia Circuit reversed, in September 2020, finding that expenditures made without the approval of the House of Representatives are an injury for which the House has standing to sue.

On February 3, 2021, the Supreme Court of the United States granted the government's motion to hold further briefing on Biden v. Sierra Club (Previously captioned as Trump v. Sierra Club) in abeyance and removed the case from its February 2021 argument calendar. On July 2, 2021, the Supreme Court of the United States vacated the Ninth Circuit's ruling in Biden v. Sierra Club and remanded the case given the change in administration and circumstances. The case was made moot with the cessation of construction and delegated to lower courts for any necessary further processing.

=== Environmental legal challenge ===
In April 2017, the Center for Biological Diversity, an environmental group, and U.S. representative Raúl Grijalva from Arizona, the ranking Democratic member on the House Committee on Natural Resources filed a lawsuit in federal court in Tucson. In their complaint, Grijalva and the Center argue that the government's wall construction plans fail to comply with the National Environmental Policy Act, and seek to compel the government to carry out an environmental impact study and produce an environmental impact statement (EIS) before building the wall. The lawsuit specifically seeks "to stop any work until the government agrees to analyze the impact of construction, noise, light and other changes to the landscape on rivers, plants and endangered species – including jaguars, Sonoran pronghorns and ocelots – and also on border residents". Two separate cases, also arguing about the government's failure to complete an EIS, were later filed, one by the groups the Sierra Club, Defenders of Wildlife and the Animal Legal Defense Fund, and the second by California's Attorney General Xavier Becerra.

The three lawsuits were consolidated into a single case within the U.S. District Court for the Southern District of California by Judge Gonzalo P. Curiel. Oral arguments were heard in February 2018, and Curiel ruled by the end of the month in favor of the government, citing that the Department of Homeland Security has several waivers in its authorization to expedite construction of border walls, which includes bypassing the EIS statement. Curiel had written his opinion without consideration of the other political issues regarding the border wall, ruling only on the environmental impact aspect. The ruling was challenged to the U.S. Supreme Court by the Sierra Club, Defenders of Wildlife, and the Animal Legal Defense Fund, but the Court denied their petition for writ of certiorari by December 2018, allowing Curiel's decision to stand.

=== Eminent domain ===
About two-thirds of the U.S.–Mexico border runs along private or state-owned lands, and the federal government would need to acquire such land through purchase or seizure (eminent domain) to build any border wall. The "process is likely to cost the government millions and could take years of complex litigation", as was the case for pre-existing border walls. In his budget request to Congress, Trump requested funds for twenty U.S. Department of Justice lawyers "to pursue federal efforts to obtain the land and holdings necessary to secure the Southwest border". In 2017, he also revived condemnation litigation against land owners that had been dormant for years. There are 162 miles (261 km) of it in Southern Texas; 144 miles (232 km) are privately owned. By December 2019, the Trump administration had acquired three miles (4.8 km).

=== Religious freedom ===
The Roman Catholic Diocese of Brownsville has challenged the government's right to build part of the wall on the grounds of a historic chapel, La Lomita Chapel in Mission, Texas. At a hearing in McAllen, Texas, on February 6, 2019, U.S. district judge Randy Crane said the diocese must allow surveyors onto the grounds. It was said that if the government did not reconsider, then the diocese would plan to assert its rights under the Religious Freedom Restoration Act, a federal law which prohibits the government from placing a "substantial burden" on the practice of religion. According to Mary McCord, a Georgetown University ICAP attorney representing the diocese, "a physical barrier that cuts off access to the chapel, and not only to Father Roy and his parish but those who seek to worship there, is clearly a substantial burden on the exercise of religious freedom."

== Polling ==
A Rasmussen Reports poll from August 19, 2015, found that 51% supported building a wall on the border, while 37% opposed.

In a January 2017 study conducted by the Pew Research Center, 39% of Americans identified construction of a U.S.–Mexico border wall as an "important goal for U.S. immigration policy". The survey found that while Americans were divided by party on many different immigration policies, "the widest [partisan split] by far is over building a southern border wall. Two-thirds of Republicans and Republican-leaning independents (67%) say construction of a wall on the U.S.–Mexico border is an important goal for immigration policy, compared with just 16% of Democrats and Democratic leaners."

A February 2017 Pew Research Center study found that "As was the case throughout the presidential campaign, more Americans continue to oppose (62%) than favor (35%) building a wall along the entire U.S. border with Mexico." 43% of respondents thought a border wall would not have much impact on illegal immigration, while 54% thought it would have an impact (29% thought it would lead to a major reduction, 25% a minor reduction). 70% of Americans thought the U.S. would ultimately pay for the wall; 16% believed Mexico would pay for it. Public opinion was polarized by party: "About three-quarters (74%) of Republicans and Republican-leaning independents support a border wall, while an even greater share of Democrats and Democratic leaners express opposition to building a wall across the entire U.S.–Mexico border (89%)." Younger Americans and Americans with college degrees were more likely to oppose a wall than older Americans and those without college degrees.

A survey conducted by the National Border Patrol Council found that 89% of border patrol agents said a "wall system in strategic locations is necessary to secure the border". 7% of agents disagreed.

A poll conducted by CBS on June 21 and 22, 2018, found that 51% supported the border wall, while 48% opposed. A poll conducted by the Senate Opportunity Fund in March 2021 found that 53% supported finishing construction of the border wall, while 38% opposed.

An updated June 2025 Pew Research Center survey found that 56% of Americans favored substantially expanding the wall along the U.S.–Mexico border, up from 46% in 2019. Republicans and Republican-leaning independents continued to overwhelmingly favor expansion (88%, compared with 86% in 2019), while support among Democrats and Democratic leaners rose from 14% to 27%, with 73% of Democrats remained opposed.

== See also ==
- Border barrier
- Border control
- Canada–United States border
- E-Verify
- Immigration reform in the United States
- Mexico–United States border
- Mexico–United States border crisis
- Open border
- Operation Intercept
- Roosevelt Reservation
- Tortilla Wall
- United States Border Patrol interior checkpoints
