= Ben Adams (disambiguation) =

Ben Adams (born 1981) is an English singer-songwriter.

Ben or Benjamin Adams may also refer to:

- Benjamin Adams (politician) (1764–1837), American lawyer and politician
- Benjamin F. Adams (1822–1902), American farmer and politician
- Benjamin Matthias Adams (1824–1902), American Methodist minister
- Benjamin C. Adams (1847–1906), Mississippi politician
- Benjamin H. Adams (1888–1989), United States Navy admiral
- Ben Adams (track and field) (1890–1961), American athlete
- Ben Adams (baseball) (1936–2005), American baseball player
- Ben Adams (police commissioner) (born 1965), British politician and police commissioner
- Ben Adams (Idaho politician), member of the Idaho House of Representatives

== See also ==
- Benjamin Adams House, an historic house in Uxbridge, Massachusetts
