= Circuit rider (religious) =

Itinerant preacher who serves a region

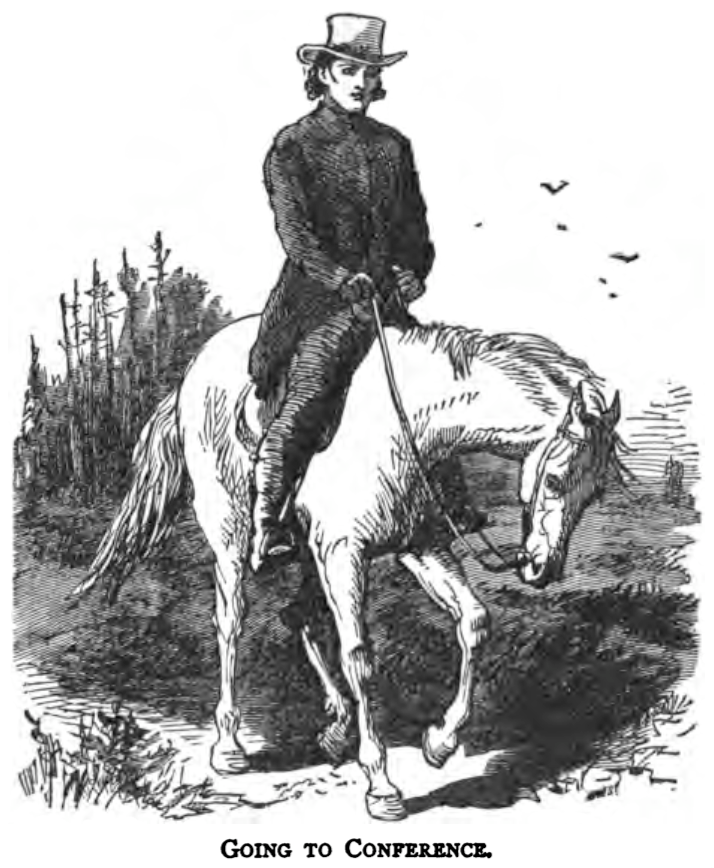
Illustration from The Circuit Rider: A Tale of the Heroic Age by Edward Eggleston, depicting a Methodist circuit rider

Circuit riders, also known as horse preachers, were clergy assigned to travel around specific geographic territories to minister to settlers and organize congregations. Circuit riders were clergy in the Methodist Episcopal Church and related denominations, although similar itinerant preachers could be found in other faiths as well, particularly among minority faith groups. They were most prominent during the early years of the United States, from 1784–1830, and were part of the Second Great Awakening revival movement.

== History ==
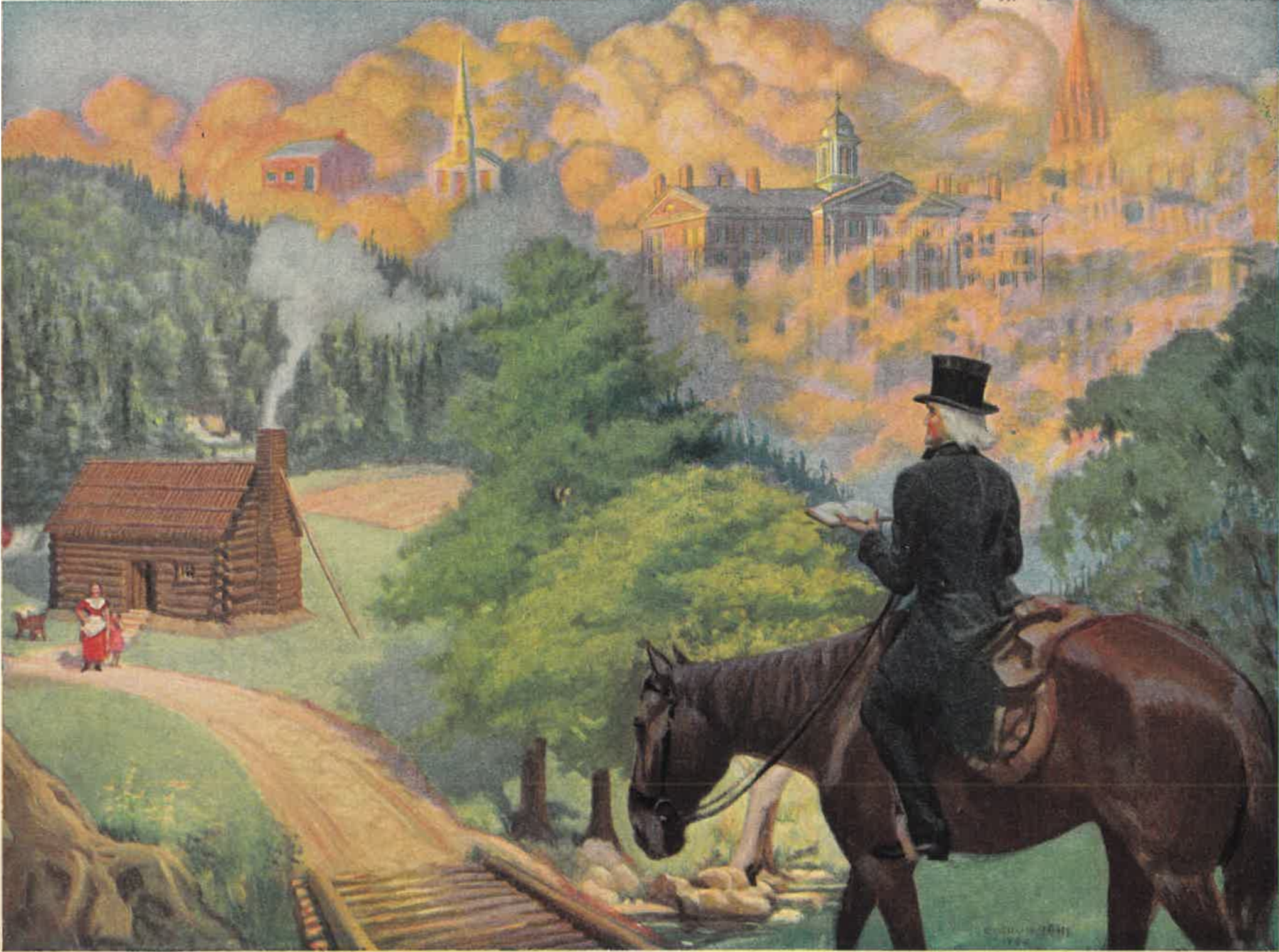
"The Vision of the Circuit Rider", a romanticized view of preachers with Bible in hand visiting humble log cabins

In sparsely populated areas of the United States it always has been common for clergy in many denominations to serve more than one congregation at a time, a form of church organization sometimes called a "preaching circuit". In the rough frontier days of the early United States, the pattern of organization in the Methodist Episcopal denomination and its successors worked especially well in the service of rural villages and unorganized settlements. In a number of Methodist denominations, congregations do not "call" (or employ) a pastor of their own choice. Instead, a bishop "appoints" (assigns) a pastor to a congregation or a group of congregations, and until late in the 20th century, neither pastor nor congregation had any say in the appointment. This meant that in the early days of the United States, as the population developed, Methodist clergy could be appointed to circuits wherever people were settling. Early leaders such as Francis Asbury and Richard Whatcoat exercised near total discretion on the selection, training, ordaining, and stationing of circuit riders.

A "circuit" (nowadays referred to as a "charge") was a geographic area that encompassed two or more local churches. Pastors met each year at "Annual Conference" where their bishops would appoint them either to a new circuit or to remain at the same one. Most often they were moved to another appointment every year. (In 1804, the Methodist Episcopal General Conference decreed that no pastor was to serve the same appointment for more than two consecutive years.) Once a pastor was assigned a circuit, it was his responsibility to conduct worship and visit members of each church in his charge on a regular basis in addition to possibly establishing new churches. He was supervised by a Presiding Elder (now called a District Superintendent) who would visit each charge four times a year, the "Quarterly Conference".

=== Rural locations ===
Riding on horseback between distant churches, these preachers were popularly called "circuit riders" or "saddlebag preachers" although their official role was "traveling clergy". Carrying only what could fit in their saddlebags, they traveled through wilderness and villages, preaching every day at any place available (peoples' cabins, courthouses, fields, meeting houses, even basements and street corners). Unlike clergy in urban areas, Methodist circuit riders were always on the move, needing five to six weeks to cover the longest routes. Their ministerial activity boosted Methodism into the largest Protestant denomination at the time, with 14,986 members and 83 traveling preachers in 1784 and by 1839, 749,216 members served by 3,557 traveling preachers and 5,856 local preachers.

The early frontier ministry was often lonely and dangerous. Samuel Wakefield's hymn describes a circuit rider's family anxiously waiting for the preacher's return; the final stanza reads

Yet still they look with glistening eye,
Till lo! a herald hastens nigh;
He comes the tale of woe to tell,
How he, their prop and glory fell;
How died he in a stranger’s room,
How strangers laid him in the tomb,
How spoke he with his latest breath,
And loved and blessed them all in death.

=== Bishop Francis Asbury ===
Francis Asbury (1745–1816), the founding bishop of American Methodism, established the precedent for circuit riding. Together with his driver and partner "Black Harry" Hosier, he traveled 270,000 miles and preached 16,000 sermons as he made his way up and down early America supervising clergy. He brought the concept of the circuit from English Methodism, where it still exists: British Methodist churches are grouped in circuits, which typically include a dozen or more churches, and ministers are appointed ("stationed") to the circuit, not to the local church. A typical English circuit has two or three times as many churches as ministers, the balance of the services being led by lay Methodist local preachers or retired ("supernumerary") ministers. The title circuit rider, however, was an American coinage born of American necessities. Although John Wesley, the founder of Methodism, covered enormous distances on horseback during his career, and early British Methodist preachers also rode around their circuits, in general they had far less formidable traveling commitments than their American counterparts.

Asbury came from humble beginnings (his father was a gardener) and took seriously the idea that Jesus ministered to the poor. He selected preachers willing to experience a similar life. He said "We must suffer with if we labor for the poor," and insisted that the trappings of respectable middle-class life be set aside. This included financial security; the annual salary of $80 for circuit riders was rarely paid in full. The result was that circuit riders were largely zealous young men, with few lasting longer than 12 years as a circuit rider due to death or retirement. Asbury also invited only circuit riders and other traveling preachers to the Methodist Annual Conference; "local" preachers were not invited.

=== Decline ===
As the United States prospered, there came to be more Methodists living in settled cities with enough population for a proper church building, and less need for the frontier-style camp revivals invoking the Holy Spirit and circuit riders. A split developed between the two styles, with more Methodists in congregations with formal attire, church choirs, seminary-educated ministers, and so on. Many Methodists ministers wanted to marry, have children, and settle down with a family, rather than the poor itinerant style favored by Asbury with its high turnover. Nathan Bangs, a former circuit rider himself in Upper Canada and Quebec, became an influential advocate within Methodism for mature style that eschewed rowdy camp meetings and had educated and middle-class clergy. While some groups sought to restore the older frontier style, in general Methodism moved beyond circuit riders as their main tool for evangelism.

== Modern Methodist practices ==
As well as being constantly on the move between the churches in their charge, Methodist ministers were regularly moved between charges, a principal known as itinerancy. Although most charges in the United States now consist of a single church, the tradition of itinerancy is still relevant in contemporary American Methodism and in most Methodist Churches worldwide. Although not moving as frequently as in the past, the average U.S. United Methodist Church pastor will stay at a local church for 2–5 years before being appointed to another charge at the Annual Conference (although technically, every pastor is assigned to a charge every year, it is just usually the same one). In British Methodism, ministers are normally appointed to a circuit for five years (again, they are stationed there annually by the Conference); the Conference may not station someone beyond this period without an invitation from the Circuit Meeting for that minister to remain in the circuit, but it is unusual for a minister to stay for longer than seven or eight years in one circuit.

In the contemporary United Methodist Church, a minister serving more than one church is referred to as having a "(number of churches) point charge".

== Examples ==
Possibly the most famous circuit rider was Peter Cartwright, who wrote two autobiographies. John B. Matthias was an early circuit rider from New York state who is credited with having written a gospel hymn, "Palms of Victory." Wilbur Fisk, who became an educator, served as a circuit rider for three years. It was not uncommon for clergy to serve on circuits for a few years and then go to other work. Kentucky native Eli P. Farmer, a circuit rider for the Methodist Episcopal Church on the Indiana frontier from 1825 to 1839, became a Bloomington, Indiana, farmer, newspaper editor, and businessman. He later served in the Indiana Senate (1843 to 1845) and as a self-appointed chaplain during the American Civil War. Joseph Tarkington, another circuit rider in Indiana, was the grandfather of novelist Booth Tarkington.

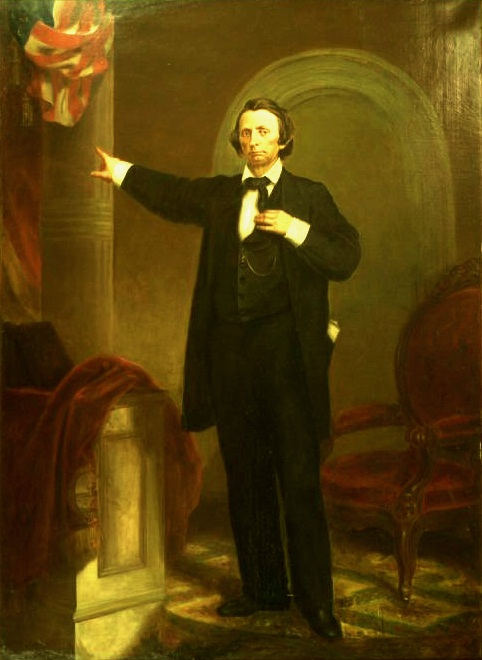
Portrait of Governor Brownlow by George Dury

William G. "Parson" Brownlow, Tennessee's radical newspaper publisher, noted book author, American Civil War-Reconstruction Era Tennessee governor, and U.S. Senator, began his career as a circuit rider in the 1820s and 1830s. Brownlow gained wide notoriety for his wild clashes --- both in person and in print --- with rival Baptist and Presbyterian missionaries and Christian sectarian authors across the Southern Appalachian region of the United States. Brownlow's books detailing the Confederate States of America military occupation of his hometown of Knoxville, Tennessee, and his own time briefly spent in a Confederate prison during the American Civil War gained Brownlow a greatly expanded audience across the northern United States who were eager to purchase both his books and admission tickets for his northern U.S. speaking tour during the later years of the American Civil War.

The father of outlaw John Wesley Hardin, James "Gip" Hardin, was a Methodist preacher and circuit rider in the mid-1800s. Hardin's father traveled over much of central Texas on his preaching circuit until 1869 when he and his family settled in Sumpter, Trinity County, Texas, where he established a school – also named for John Wesley, the founder of Methodism.

Thomas S. Hinde was a Methodist circuit rider in Illinois, Indiana, Kentucky and Missouri from the early 1800s until about 1825. He eventually settled in Mount Carmel, Illinois, the town he had earlier founded. Hinde was a notable minister, newspaper publisher, attorney, real estate entrepreneur and clerk for the Ohio House of Representatives. More than 47 volumes of his personal and business documents are among the Lyman Draper collection at the Wisconsin Historical Society, since they were donated after his death by his son-in-law, Charles H. Constable.

Father Pierre Yves Kéralum was a Catholic priest who ministered to ranchers in the Lower Rio Grande Valley from 1853 to 1872. He was one of about thirty Catholic priests known as the Cavalry of Christ because they traveled on horseback. Kéralum was also an architect who designed and helped build churches such as the Immaculate Conception Cathedral in Brownsville, Texas, as well as chapels, rectories, and other buildings in the region.

== In culture ==
In retrospect, the circuit rider became a romantic figure and was featured in a number of novels in the late 19th and early 20th centuries. Two of these novels are Edward Eggleston's The Circuit Rider and Ernest Thompson Seton's Preacher of Cedar Mountain.

A circuit rider is also a character in the Newbery Award–winning novel for children, Caddie Woodlawn, set in western Wisconsin in the 1860s.

During the 1970s, prior to its sign-off message, Richmond, Virginia, television station WWBT broadcast "Justice and The Circuit Rider", a rural preacher appearing on his mount, Justice, and presenting a brief parable using props from his saddlebag. These spots also appeared on the Richmond ABC affiliate WXEX, now operating as WRIC-TV just after the end of "Shock Theater". In these short films, the host was identified only as the Circuit Rider from Cobbs Creek, Virginia, at the end of the three-minute segment. The preacher was William B. Livermon Sr., who served several Virginia churches during his lifetime before dying in 1992.

Inspired by the story of Catholic circuit rider Pierre Yves Kéralum, author Paul Horgan wrote a fictionalized account of the priest's last days titled The Devil in the Desert (1952).

Elliott Smith's 'Coast To Coast' on From A Basement On The Hill features mention of Circuit riders, with the song formerly being named as such up until 2001-2002.

== Autobiographies ==
The first-person accounts of pioneer circuit riders give insight to the culture of the early United States as well as the theology and sociology of religion (and especially Methodism) in the young nation. Quite a few circuit riders published memoirs. These are generally available in the collections of United Methodist seminary libraries. The United Library of Garrett-Evangelical Theological Seminary and Seabury-Western Theological Seminary (Evanston, Illinois) seems to have the largest collection of these writings, including over 70 items.

Through his role as chairman of the United Methodist editorial committee in Shreveport, Louisiana, in the latter 1970s, the historian Walter M. Lowrey spearheaded a project, A History of Louisiana Methodism, which includes material on the church's extensive network of circuit riders.
