= Trinity United Methodist Church (Lafayette, Indiana) =

Historic church in Indiana, United States

Coordinates: 40.420752°N 86.891027°W

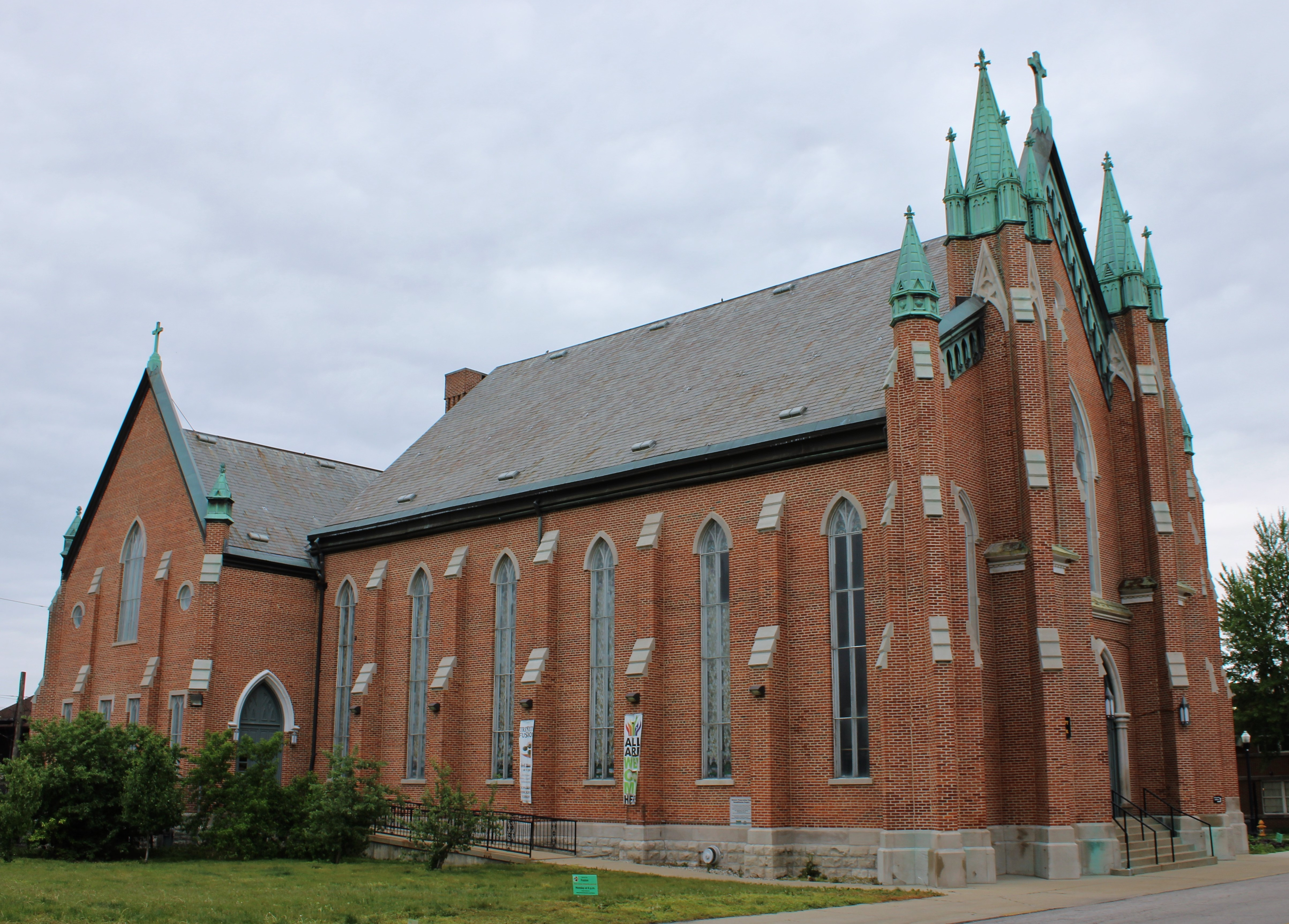
Trinity United Methodist Church in 2023

Trinity United Methodist Church, the first church in Lafayette, Indiana, was established in 1824, before the city was founded. The first meetings were held in the old log courthouse; the church was formally organized in 1827 with ten members. Trinity United Methodist is located at 314 North Sixth Street in Lafayette, Indiana 47901.

== History ==
While traveling on the Crawfordsville Circuit, a Methodist circuit riding preacher named Eli P. Farmer organized in 1824 the first church in Lafayette, Indiana, which became the present-day Trinity United Methodist Church.

In 1830, the first church building was built on Sixth Street for $1,500. In 1836, the church moved to the northwest corner of Fifth and Ferry streets. They worshiped there until 1845 when they moved into a building along Fifth Street.

Lot #140 at Sixth and North streets was purchased in 1868 for $7,000. The Chapel (now the portion of the current building that contains the Parlor) was completed in 1869; the Sanctuary was completed in 1873 and was formally dedicated on March 23, 1873. The cost for the building was $90,000. In 1869, the church was officially given the name Trinity, as other Methodist churches were being established in the community.

Trinity's stained glass windows were designed by Edna Browning Ruby, a world-famous artist from Lafayette. She also made stained glass windows for area churches, including Stidham United Methodist Church and Elston Presbyterian Church.

One of the biggest changes to the church building was the installation of the basement in the 1930s. In 1933, the Homebuilders Sunday school class volunteered to enlarge the basement. By hand-digging the entire area of the current basement and carrying out the dirt in buckets, they created the space that now houses the Fellowship Hall, the Friendship Room and the kitchen. Numerous upgrades, remodeling and building projects have happened at the church since then.

== Current usage ==
Trinity is a Welcoming and Reconciling Congregation and part of the Reconciling Ministries Network. Trinity offers a blended style of worship, including traditional hymns led by a pipe organ and contemporary choruses led from the piano. The preaching is centered on scripture and offers practical guidance for daily living.

== See also ==
- Centennial Neighborhood District
