= National Butterfly Center =

Butterfly conservatory in Mission, Texas, United States

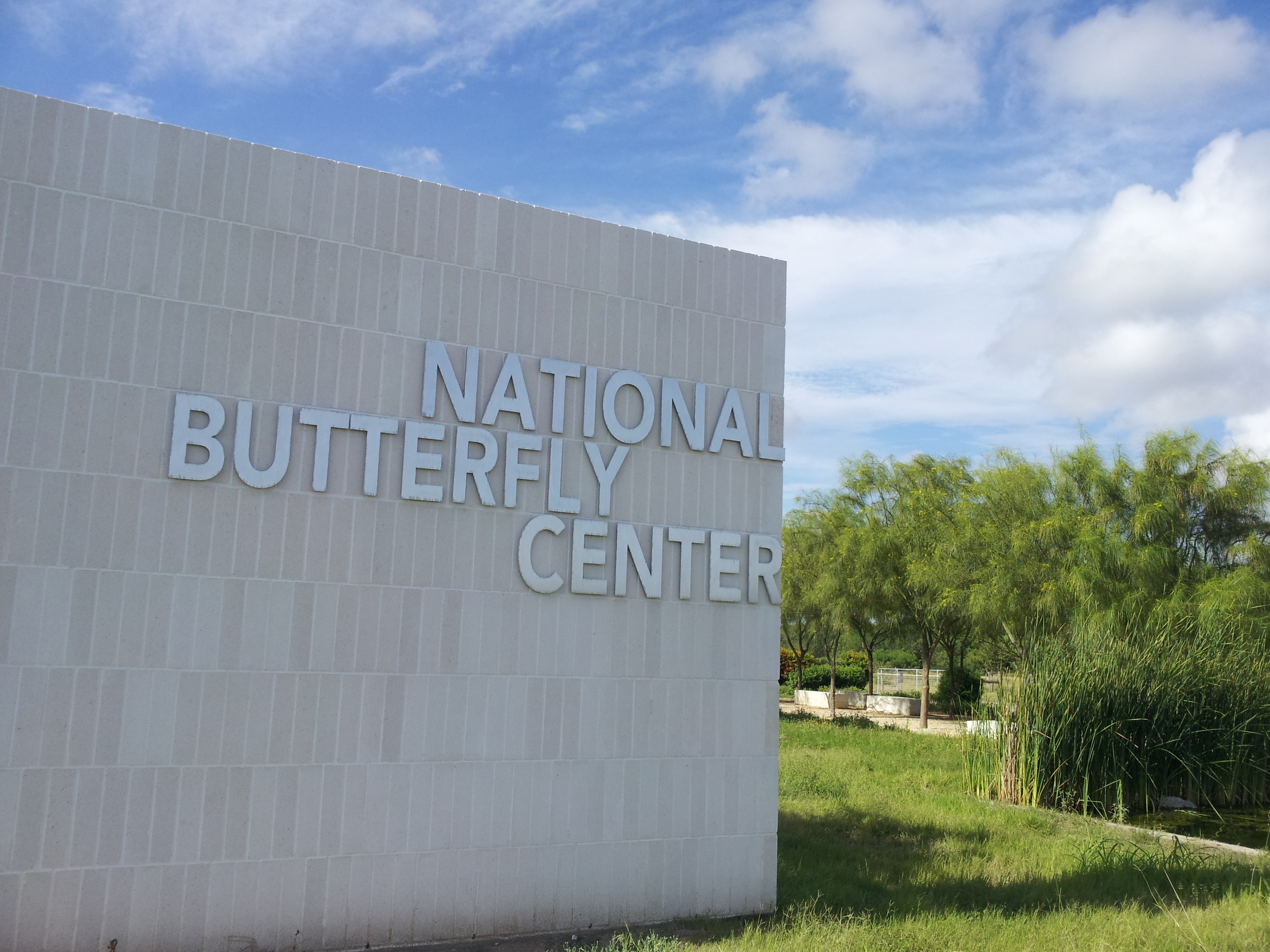
- Interactive map of National Butterfly Center
- Location: Hidalgo County, Texas
- Nearest city: Mission, Texas
- Coordinates: 26.1802°N 98.3650°W
- Founder: Jeffrey Glassberg
- Operator: North American Butterfly Association
- Visitors: 35,000 (2021)
- Executive director: Stephanie Lopez
- Website: www.nationalbutterflycenter.org

The National Butterfly Center is a private nature preserve operated by the North American Butterfly Association that serves as an outdoor butterfly conservatory. It is located adjacent to Bentsen-Rio Grande Valley State Park, near the city of Mission in Hidalgo County in the U.S. state of Texas.

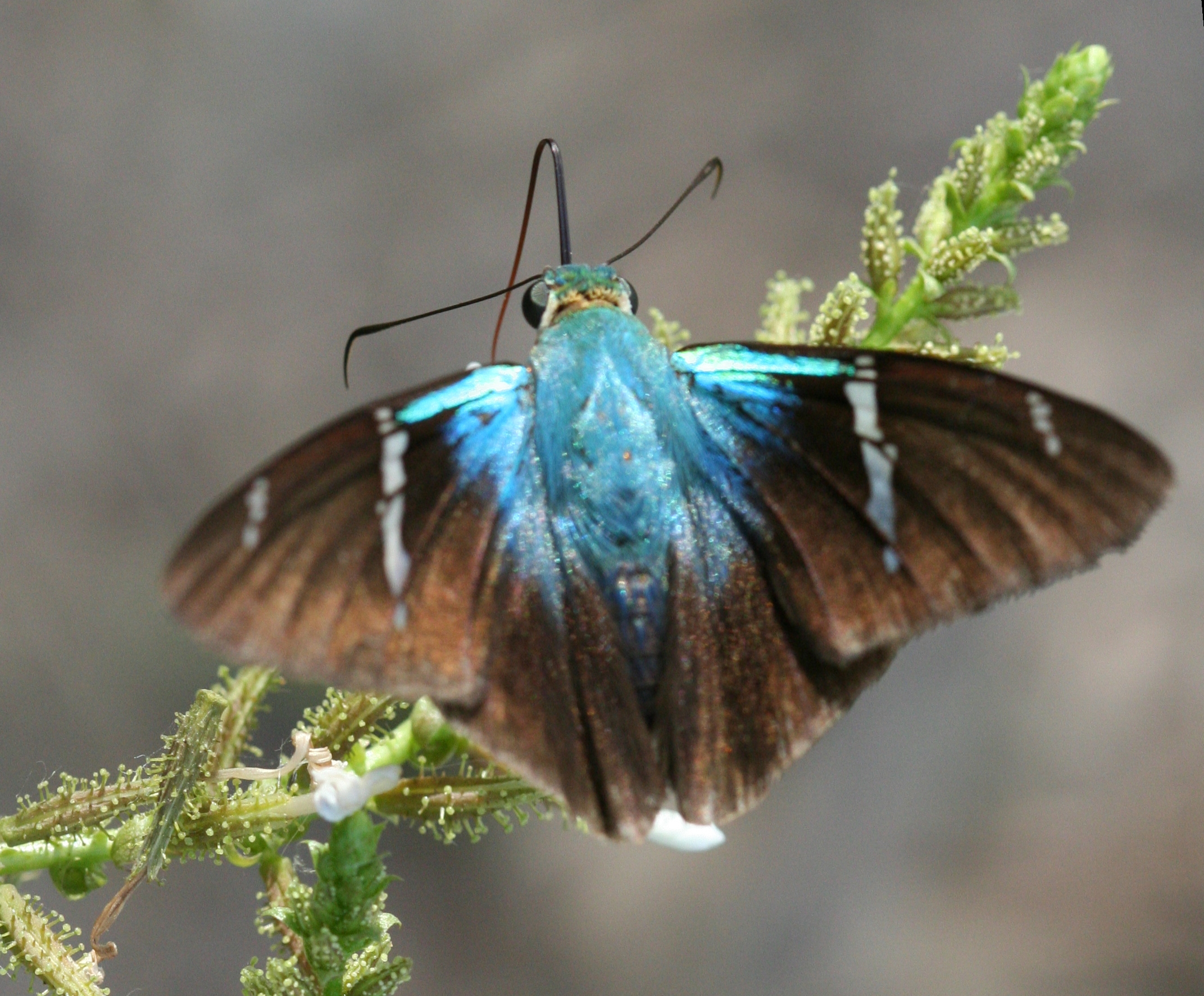
Two-barred flasher (Telegonus fulgerator), Lower Rio Grande Valley, Texas

== Description ==
The National Butterfly Center is engaged in preserving the 340 species of butterflies found in the Rio Grande Valley through habitat restoration. It is considered "the most diverse sanctuary" for butterflies in the United States.

The grounds of the center are planted with native species that provide nectar for butterflies, and serve as hosts for caterpillars.

Over 240 species of butterflies have been identified in the center's grounds, including the monarch butterfly, the Mexican bluewing, and the red-bordered pixie. Habitat restoration has also attracted birds to the center that cannot be seen anywhere else in the continental US, such as green jays and chachalacas, and the grounds are home to bobcats, armadillos, coyotes and tortoises.

Visitors can typically see over 60 species of butterflies on a visit to the center. Its executive director is Stephanie Lopez.

== US–Mexico border wall ==
The proposed US–Mexico border wall is slated to pass through the grounds of the National Butterfly Center. Filmmaker Krista Schlyer, part of an all-woman team creating a documentary film about the butterflies and the border wall, Ay Mariposa, estimates that construction would put "70 percent of the preserve habitat behind the border wall."

In late July 2017, a National Butterfly Center employee was surprised to discover a bulldozer crew clearing vegetation with a chainsaw and a brush mower, in an area that had been restored with native species from its earlier use as an onion field. The crew had no paperwork indicating they were authorized to clear this land. Even though the Department of Justice was required to notify the landowner in writing, neither the center's founder, Jeffrey Glassberg, nor the center's director had been informed about the plans to clear the land.

On August 1, 2017, the chief of the Border Patrol's Rio Grande Valley sector indicated that although Starr County, Texas, was his first priority for a wall, the nearby Santa Ana National Wildlife Refuge had been selected instead for initial construction, because its land was owned by the government.

In early December 2018, a challenge to wall construction at the National Butterfly Center was rejected by the US Supreme Court. According to the San Antonio Express-News, "the high court let stand an appeals ruling that lets the administration bypass 28 federal laws", including the Endangered Species Act, the Safe Drinking Water Act and the Native American Graves Protection and Repatriation Act.

In a December 17, 2018, opinion piece in the Washington Post, the center's nature photographer and outreach coordinator expressed concerns about the loss of habitat and disruption to nocturnal species, and said:

Right now, in Mission, Texas, we don’t worry about immigrants who crossed the border illegally or drug smugglers. We worry about having to defend our private property from seizure by the federal government.

The center's director noted that the local economic impact will also be considerable, saying "environmental tourism contributes more than $450m to Hidalgo and Starr counties."

Bulldozers were expected to arrive in early 2019 to continue construction, and on February 5 heavy equipment was seen at the site, and was met by protesters.

=== Legislative and court actions ===
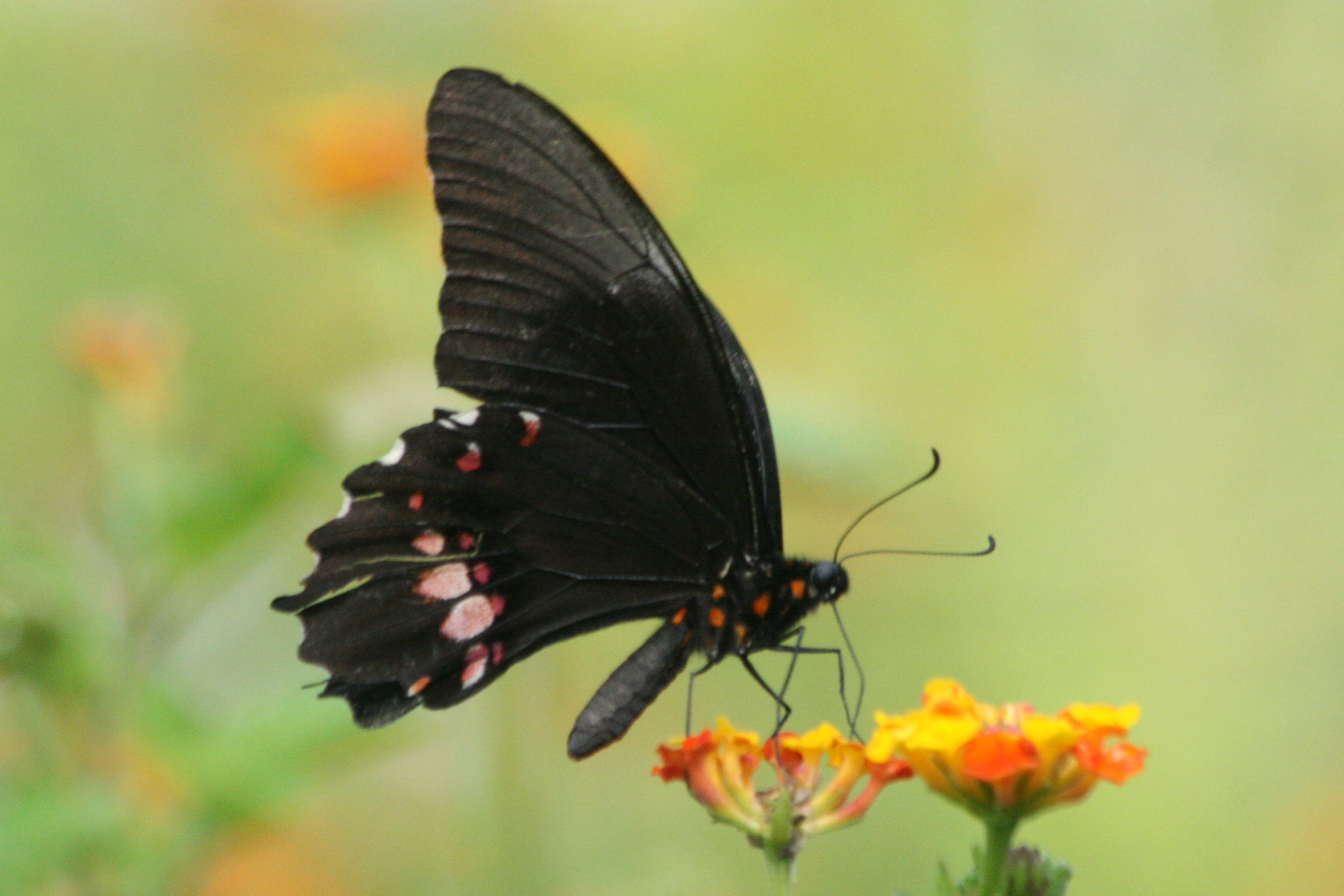
Ruby-spotted swallowtail (Papilio anchisiades), Bentsen-Rio Grande Valley State Park

In February 2019, Congress amended an existing appropriations bill, adding language that specifically prohibits new funding from being used to build border barriers at the National Butterfly Center, La Lomita Chapel, the Santa Ana National Wildlife Refuge, the Bentsen-Rio Grande Valley State Park, and the area "within or east of" the Vista del Mar Ranch tract of the Lower Rio Grande Valley National Wildlife Refuge. Soon afterwards, however, President Trump declared a National Emergency Concerning the Southern Border of the United States, which the administration claimed invalidated the restrictions imposed by Congress. As a result, the status of the protected sites was still in question.

On May 24, 2019, a federal judge blocked the Trump administration's plan to divert funds not explicitly appropriated by Congress, ruling that "Congress's 'absolute' control over federal expenditures—even when that control may frustrate the desires of the Executive Branch regarding initiatives it views as important—is not a bug in our constitutional system. It is a feature of that system, and an essential one."

== QAnon ==
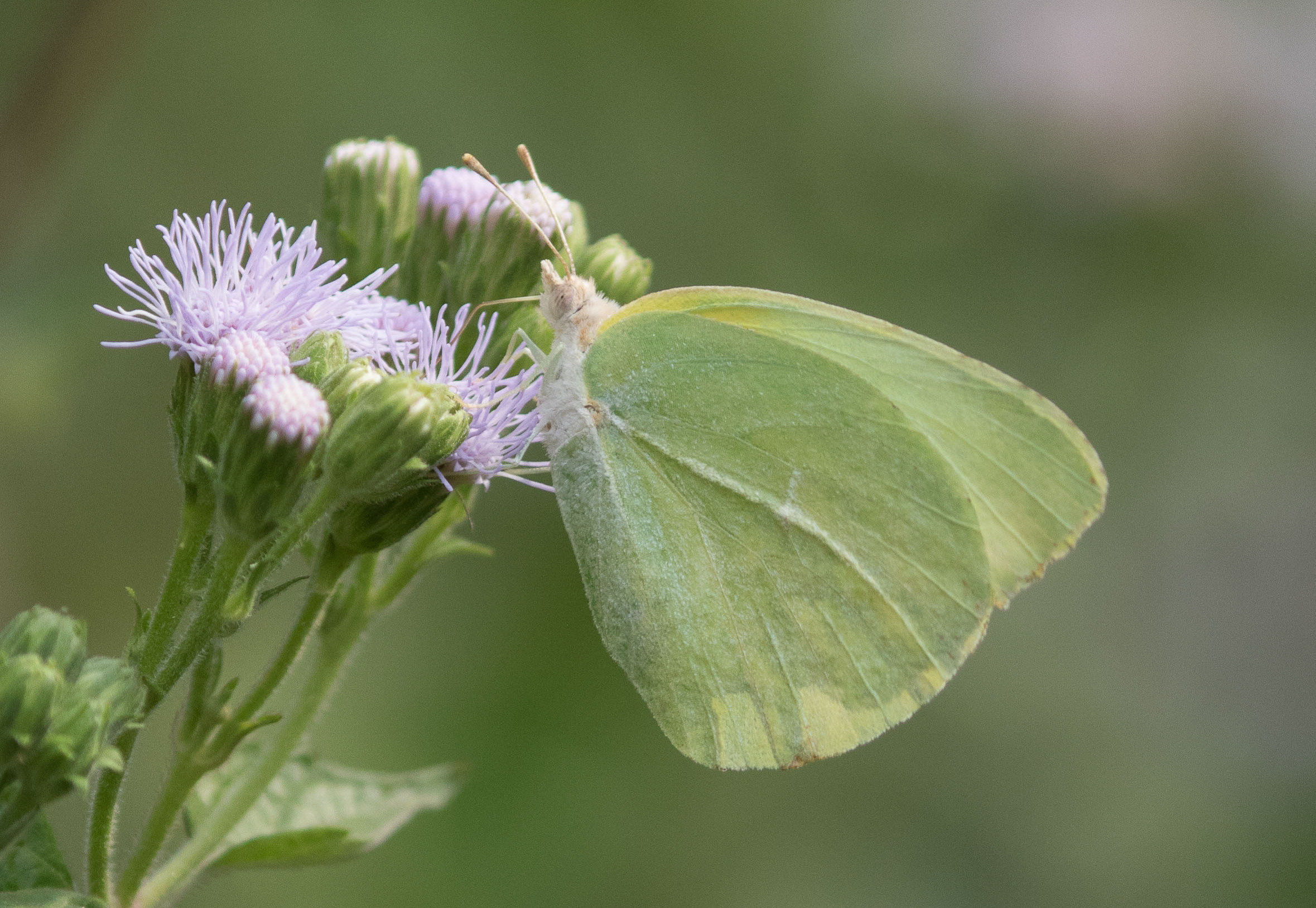
Lyside sulpher (Kricogonia lyside), National Butterfly Center

After a QAnon conspiracy theory spread on social media that the National Butterfly Center was smuggling migrants into the US, in late January 2022, Republican Congressional candidate Kimberly Lowe and her purported Secret Service Agent visited the center referring to "the rafts with the illegal crossing" and to child rape, then reportedly injured the director, Marianna Trevino Wright, and almost struck her son with their vehicle. In response, the center closed for three days the following weekend as a precaution during the We Stand America rally nearby, and announced on February 3, 2022, that it would be closed indefinitely for "the safety of our staff and visitors". The center reopened on Earth Day in 2022.

== Wildlife at the National Butterfly Center ==
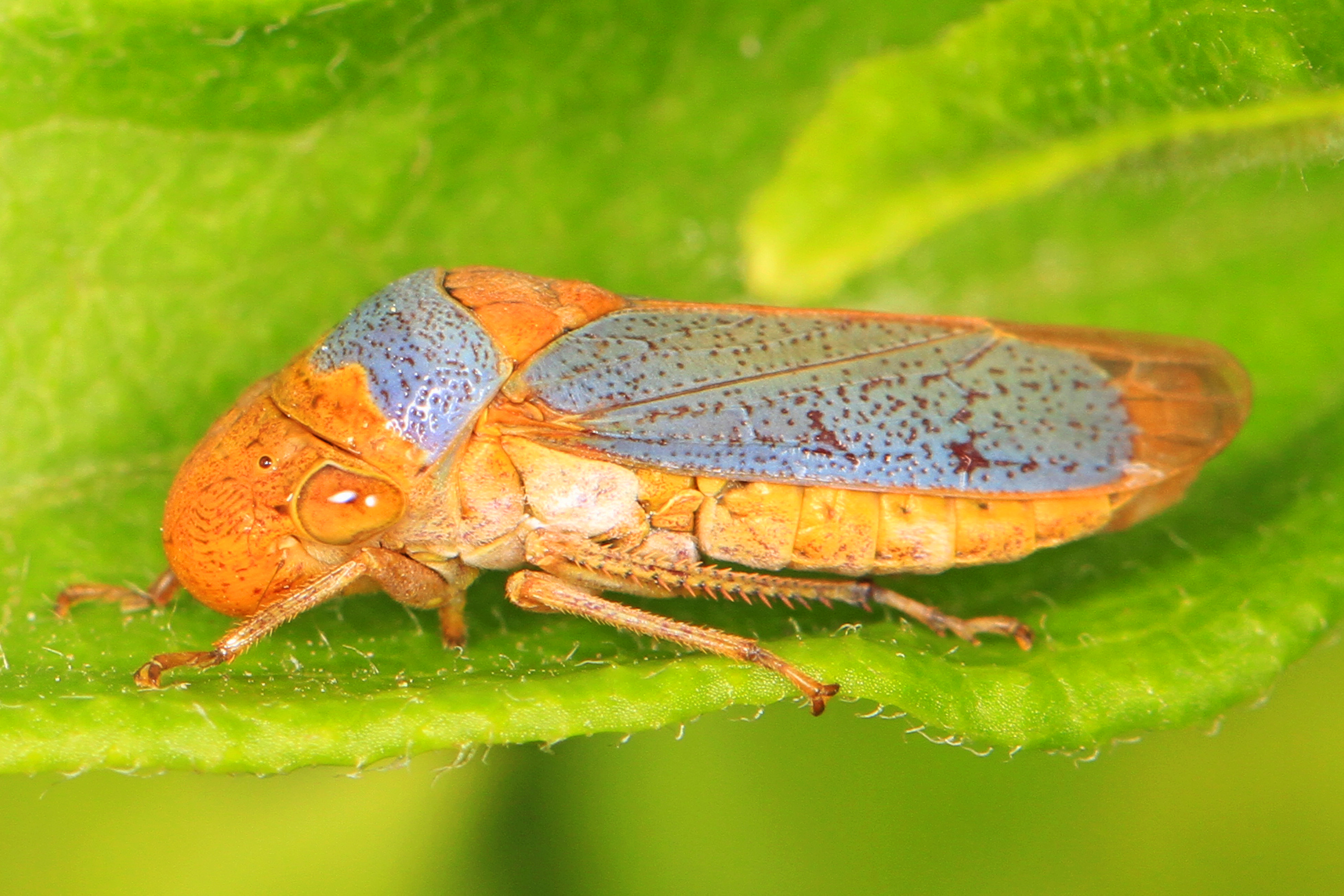
Sharpshooter (Oncometopia clarior)

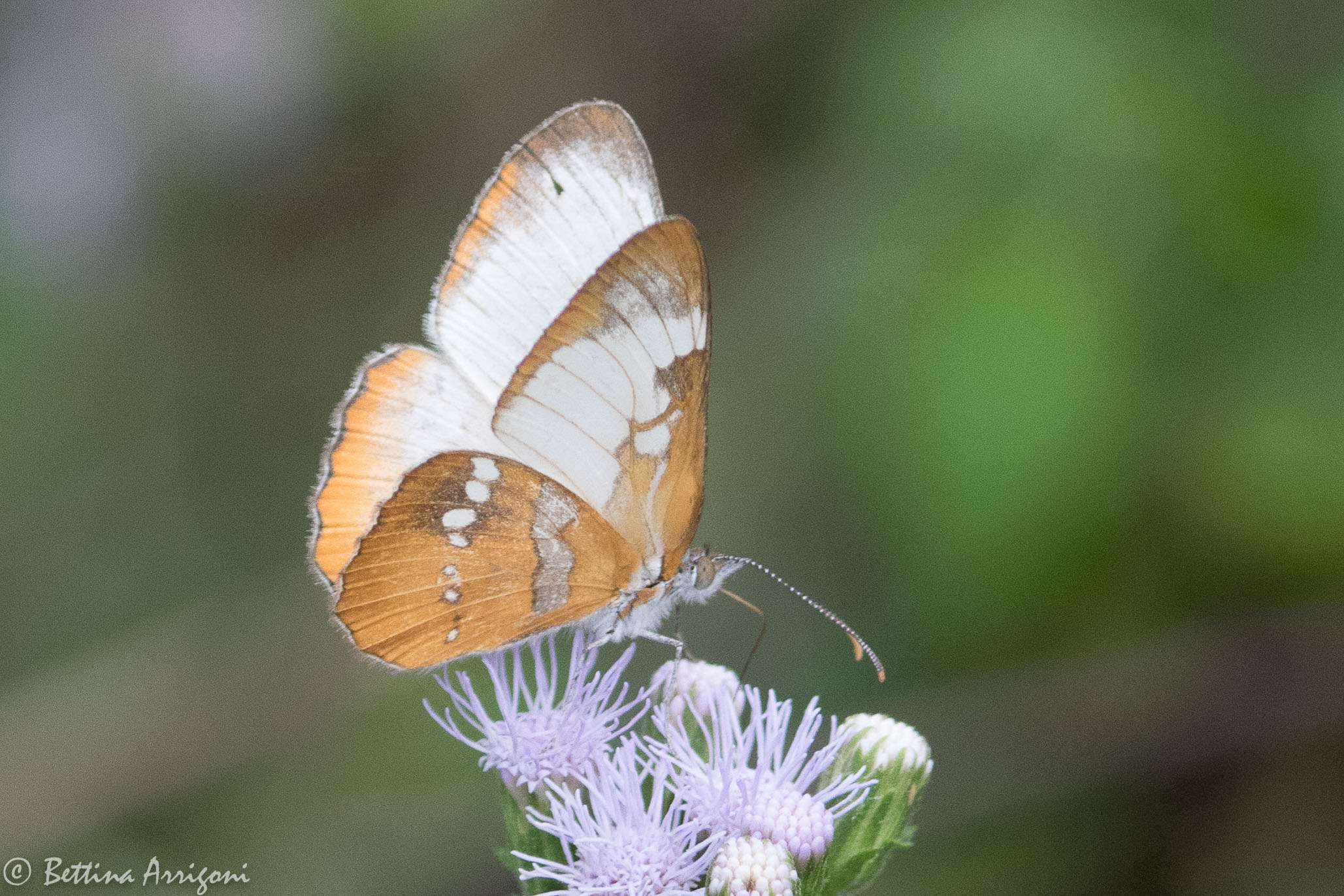
Common Mestra (Mestra dorcas)

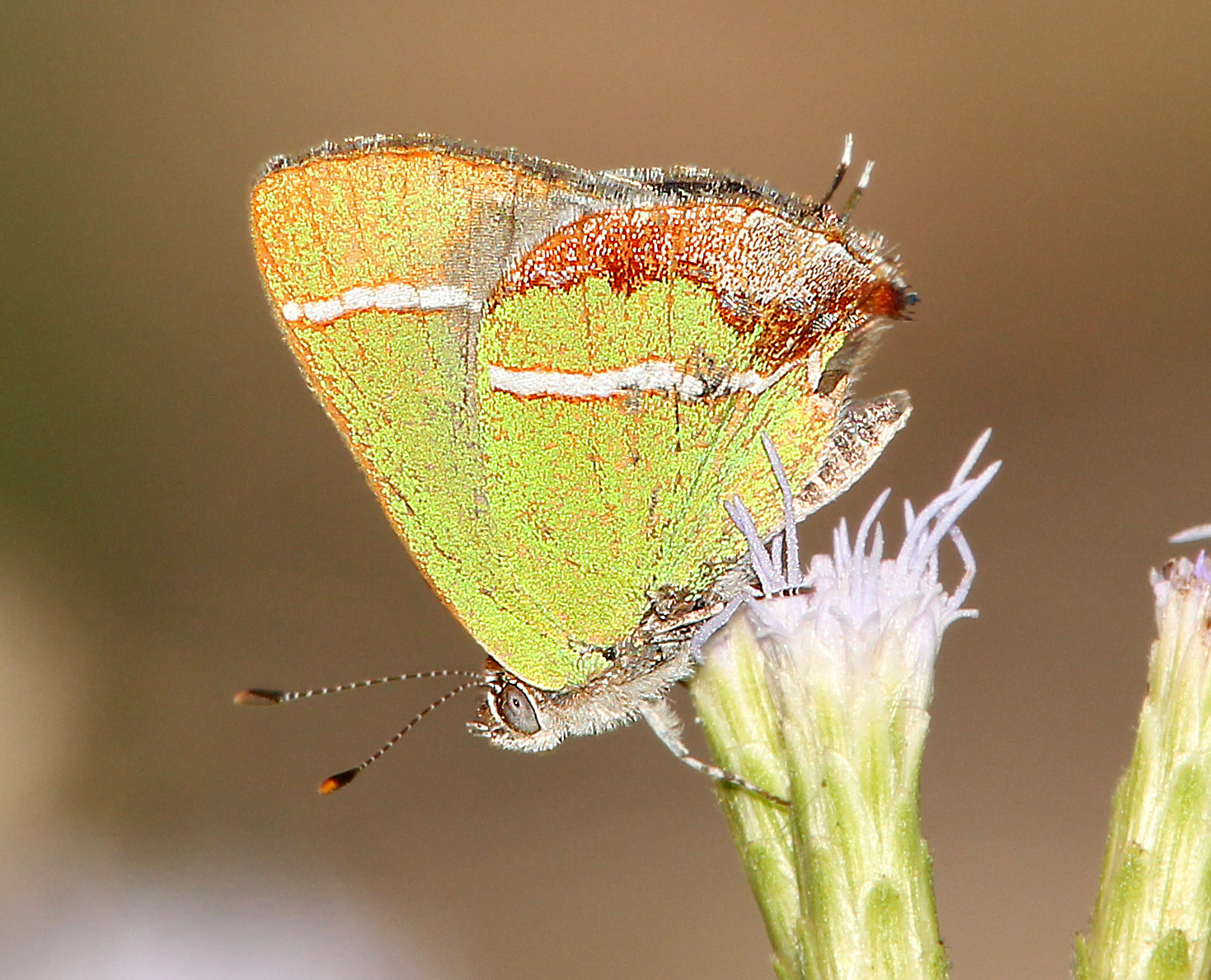
Silver-banded hairstreak (Chlorostrymon simaethis)

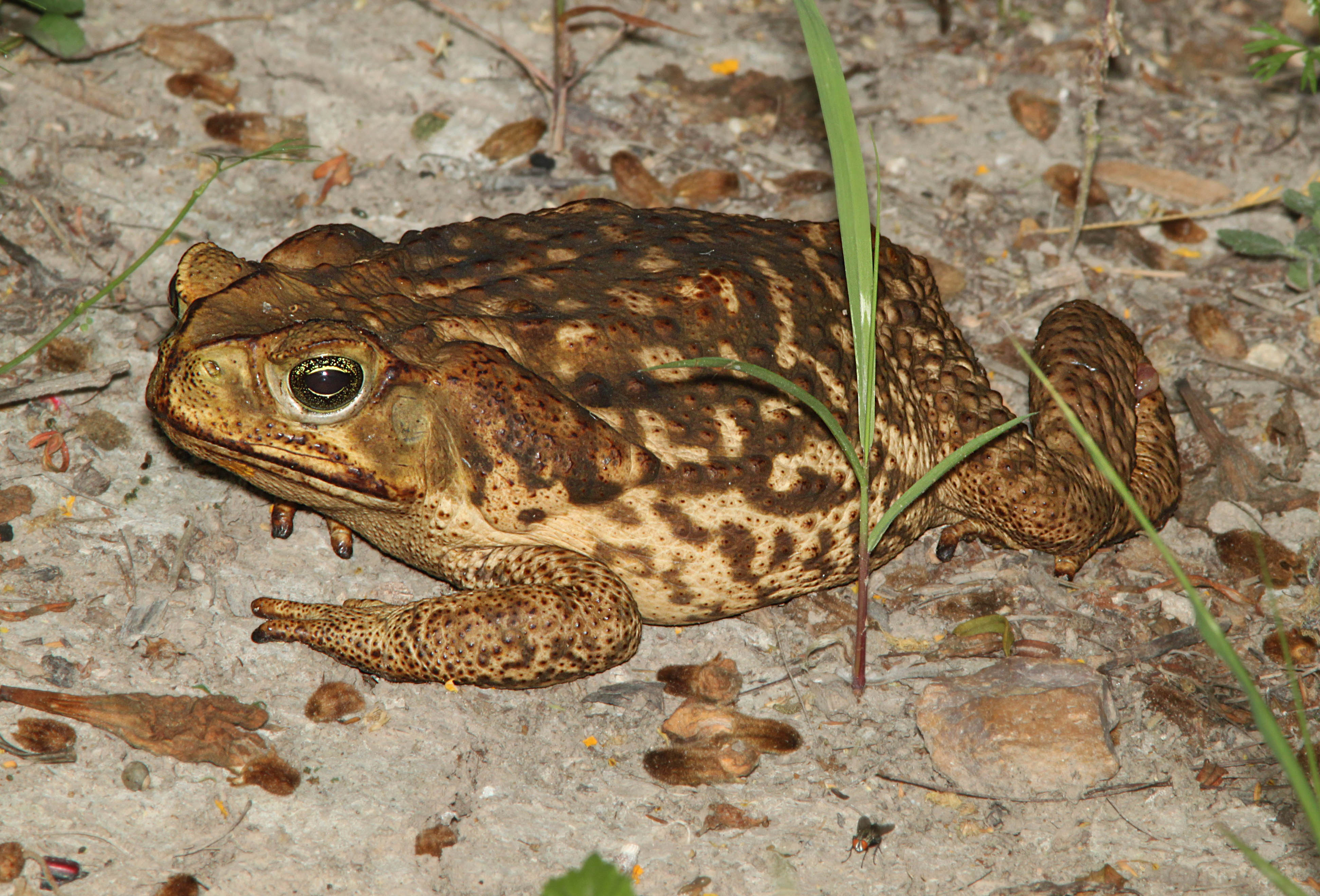
Mesoamerican cane toad (Rhinella horribilis)

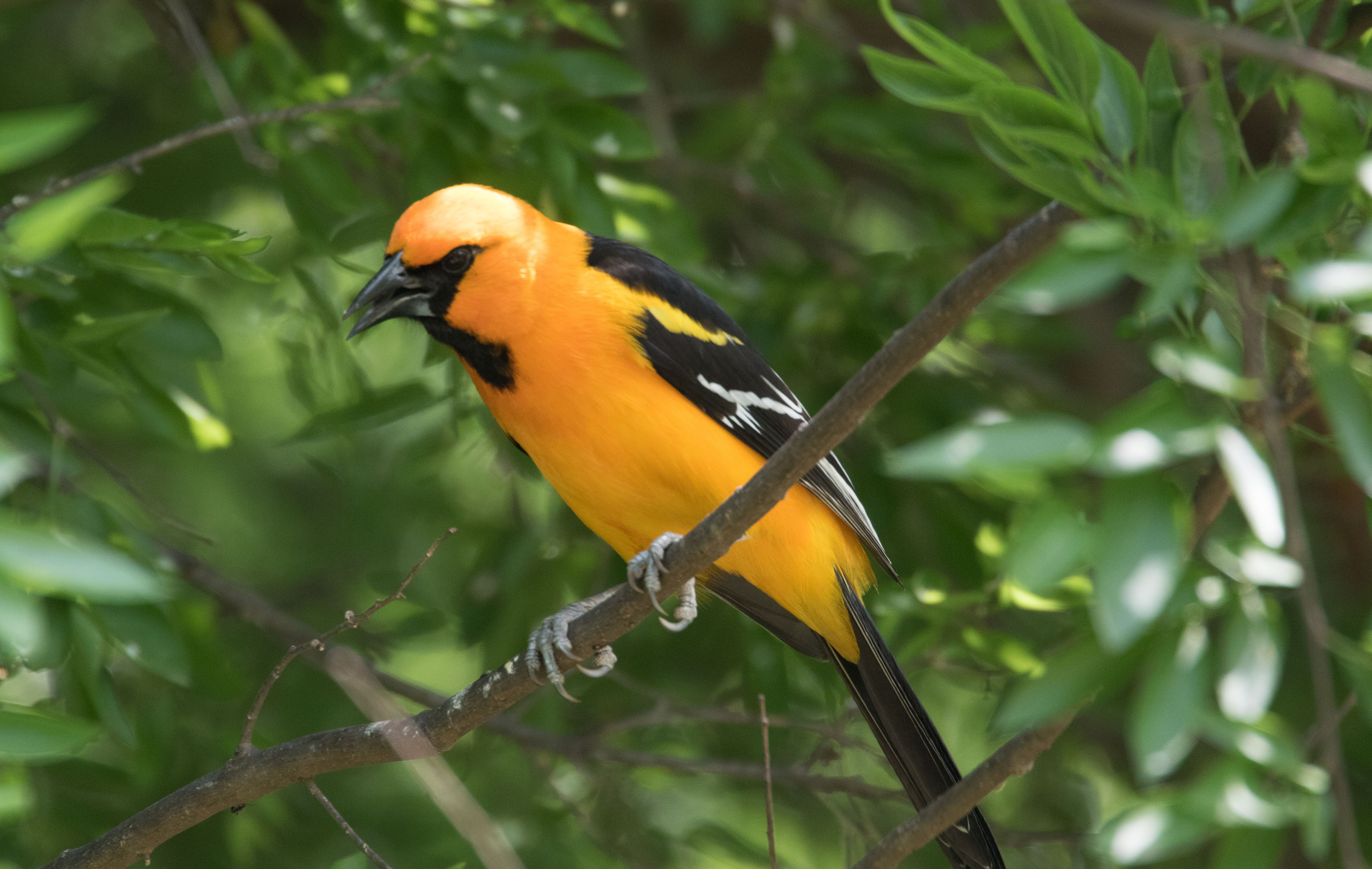
Altamira oriole (Icterus gularis), male

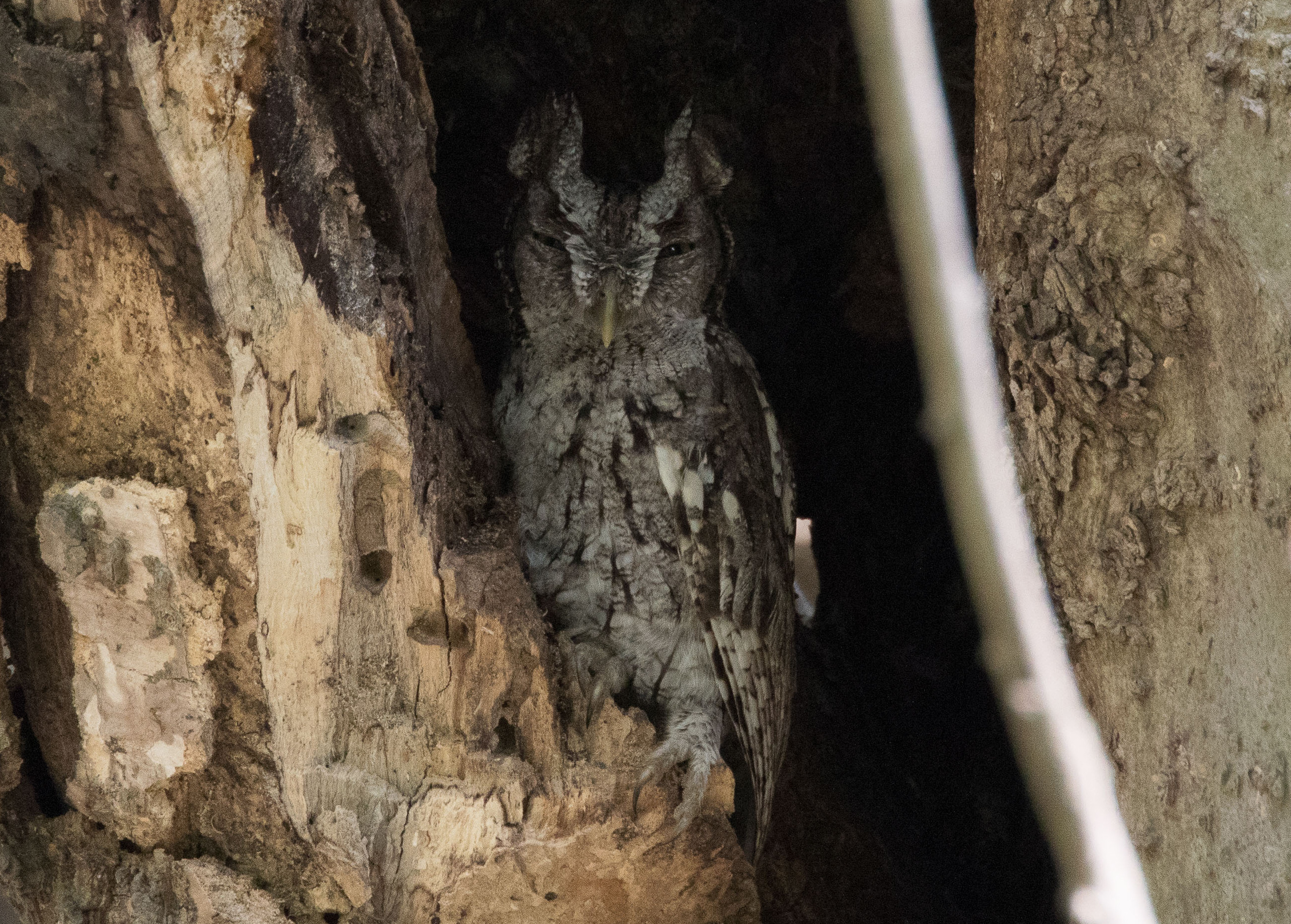
Eastern screech owl (Megascops asio)
