= Lifecodes (company) =

- Founded: 1982
- Founder: Jeffrey Glassberg

Lifecodes, formerly known as ACTAGEN (Advanced Clinical Testing And Genetics), was a company founded in 1982 that throughout a 10-year period dominated the DNA fingerprinting scene. The company worked closely with prosecutors in order to provide DNA evidence for trials. Through the case of People v. Castro, it was revealed that Lifecodes did not fulfill their own stated standards and had sloppy record keeping. Their failure in maintaining standards, led the National Academy of Sciences to establish a panel which would standardize DNA fingerprinting for judicial affairs.

== Background ==
ACTAGEN was founded in 1982 by Jeffrey Glassberg and two other medical researchers. With the help of National Distillers and Chemicals Corporation, ACTAGEN began to research DNA fingerprinting and managed to patent their own procedure. After ACTAGEN’s successful patenting of their technique, National Distillers and Chemicals Corporation, which owned half of ACTAGEN, changed their name to Quantum Chemical Corporation in 1986. Then they bought the rest of ACTAGEN and renamed it Lifecodes. Founder Jeffrey Glassberg would then continue to work with the company until 1988. At some point later, Lifecodes was acquired by Immucor, to which it still belongs in 2020.

== People v. Castro ==
In 1996, Lifecodes came under scrutiny after its role in the People v. Castro case was found to be sloppy and negligent. After Joseph Castro was accused of murdering Vilma Ponce and her daughter, Lifecodes was asked to examine a bloodstained watch. After stating that the watch confiscated from Mr. Castro matched the DNA of Vilma, the defense brought forward evidence that showed mishandle of the sample. Upon further investigation, it was found that Lifecodes not only mishandled the blood but also utilized contaminated equipment. Their standards for matching bloods were different to their standards at proving the match. This made their confidence levels higher than what they should have been. Lifecodes' failure in this trial led to a change in terms of standardization of DNA fingerprinting. The National Academy of Sciences had to establish an authority that would oversee all processes regarding the matching of DNA in order to set concrete standards across all cases.
