= La Lomita Chapel =

Historic church in Texas, United States

- U.S. National Register of Historic Places
- Recorded Texas Historic Landmark
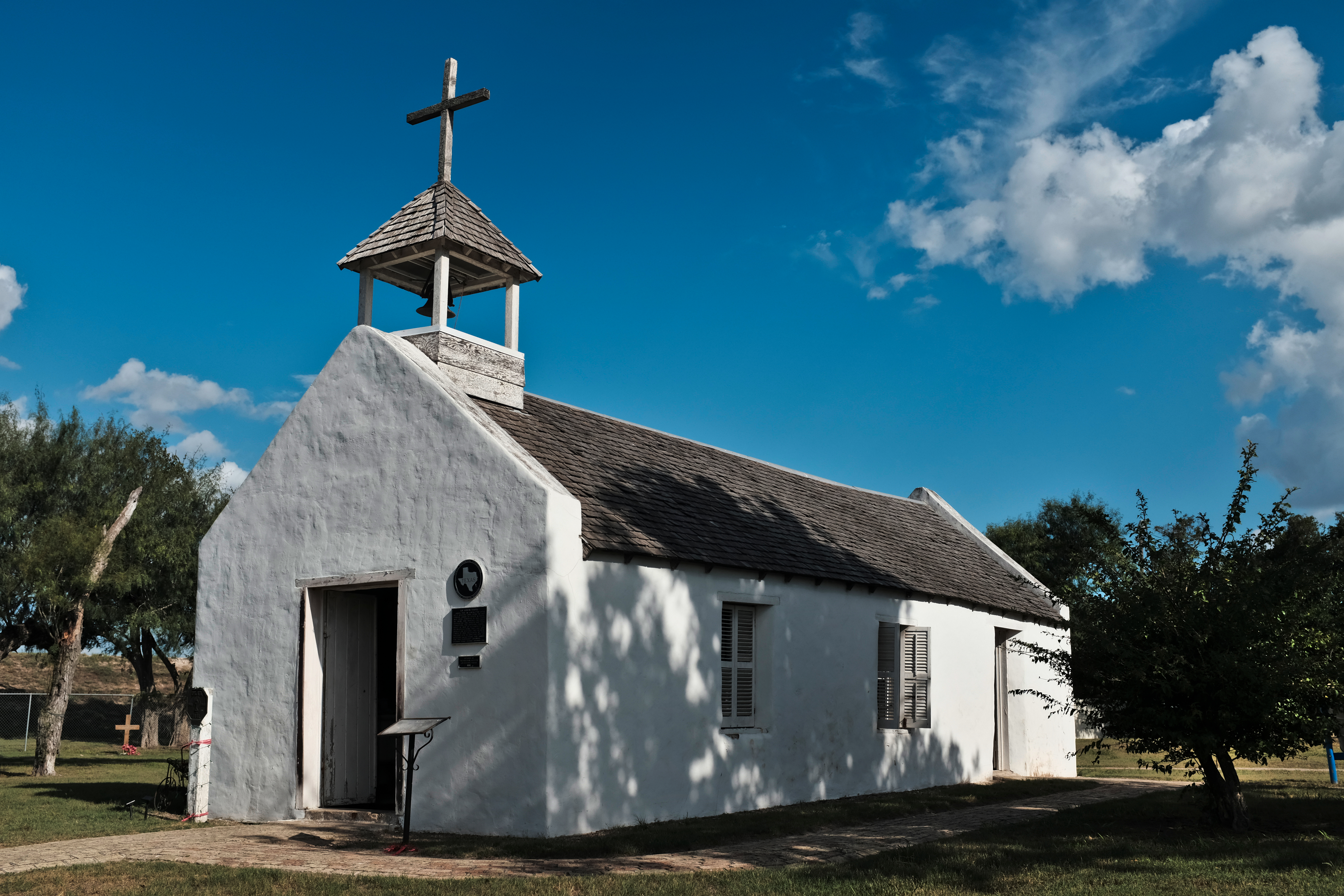
- La Lomita Chapel in 2014

- Location within Texas Location within the United States
- Location: 3 miles south of Expressway 83 on FM 1016, Mission, TX 78572
- Coordinates: 26°9′28″N 98°19′50″W
- Built: 1865, 1899
- NRHP reference No.: 75002165
- RTHL No.: 2997
- Designated RTHL: 1964

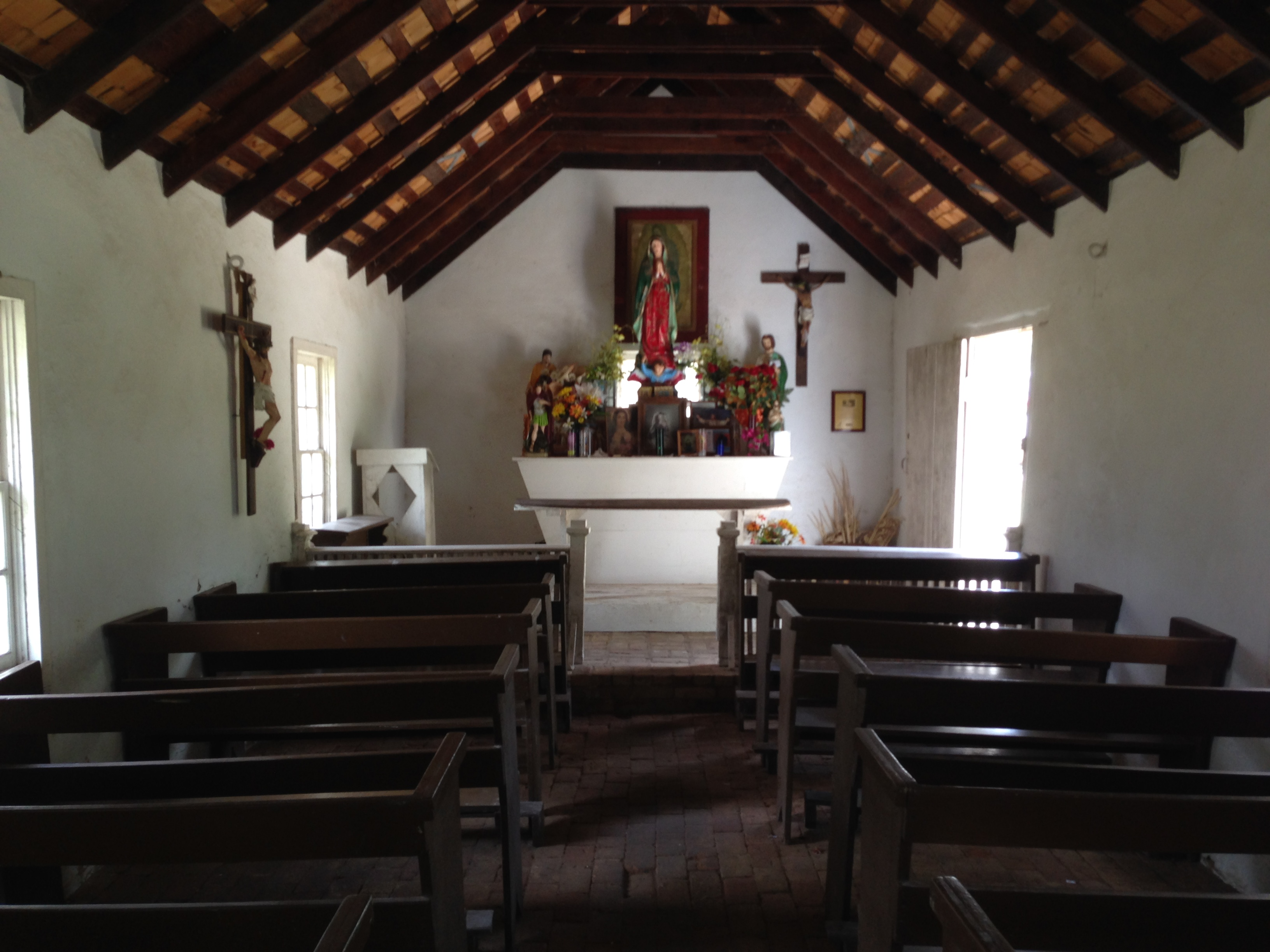

La Lomita Chapel is a historic Catholic chapel in Mission, Texas. It was once an important site for the Cavalry of Christ, a group of priests who traveled long distances on horseback to minister to Catholics living on isolated ranches along the Rio Grande.

In 2018, the chapel became the subject of a dispute between the United States government and the Catholic Church due to the Trump administration's proposal to seize the chapel's land for the border wall between the U.S. and Mexico. In 2019, the proposed seizure was blocked by a budget provision enacted by Congress.

== Architecture and site ==
The chapel is made of white adobe. Its land is adjacent to the Rio Grande.

== History ==
The site was first named La Lomita ("the hillock") by a rancher, José Antonio Cantu, who was granted the land by Spain in 1770. In 1851, a French merchant named René Guyard purchased the land. A devout Catholic, Guyard built the chapel in 1865, and in 1871 bequeathed it to the Missionary Oblates of Mary Immaculate. Located between the Brownsville and Roma missions, La Lomita became an important stop for the Cavalry of Christ; it served some 65 area ranches, and traveling missionaries often stopped there to rest.

The area developed into a village as the Oblate Fathers constructed a rectory, a guest house, a blacksmith shop, a buggy shed, and quarters for the lay brothers and laborers in what is now La Lomita Historic District. Following a flood in 1899, the chapel was rebuilt with stones from the surrounding hillside. When the city of Mission, Texas, was founded in 1908, it was named in honor of La Lomita. The chapel was designated a Recorded Texas Historic Landmark in 1964, and was added to the National Register of Historic Places in 1975. In 2010, a team of consultants was hired to restore the building; the project won a TSA Design Award and was featured in Texas Architect magazine.

Professor Terry G. Jordan-Bychkov has suggested that La Lomita chapel, along with several other small, parapet-gabled buildings in the region, were designed by the noted French-American priest and architect Pierre Yves Kéralum: "Father Keralum had the expertise, background, and mobility to achieve a substantial implantation of the Atlantic European roof type. Moreover, some related features such as gable-end shed rooms and table or bed outshots are also known in Breton folk architecture." Today, according to a local guidebook, La Lomita stands "—small and humble, cared for and preserved—marking the important role it played in the history of the area."

=== Border wall dispute ===
In October 2018, the United States Border Patrol filed a federal lawsuit to seize the land surrounding the chapel and begin surveying for a border fence. The pastor, Roy Snipes, and his bishop, Daniel E. Flores, oppose the project, and the Brownsville diocese has tried to put a stop to it in court. In December 2018, the Georgetown University Law Center's Institute for Constitutional Advocacy and Protection (ICAP) filed a brief in support of the diocese. The construction as planned would cut off access to the church, which would be on the Mexican side of the fence. Moreover, according to Flores, the entire border wall project is "contrary to Catholic principles of the universality of human relations."

Locals held several demonstrations in support of La Lomita. On Palm Sunday, April 14, 2019, over a thousand parishioners held a procession from Our Lady of Guadalupe Church to the chapel. After the procession, Pastor Roy Snipes was nominated for an award by Catholic Extension, a national fundraising organization that supports poor mission dioceses across the country. In retaliation for opposing the wall, Snipes became the target of a right-wing smear campaign. The "We Build the Wall" group (a privately funded effort, led by Steve Bannon, Brian Kolfage, and Kris Kobach, to build a portion of Trump's border wall) vilified both Snipes and the National Butterfly Center (another border site in south Texas that opposed wall construction on its land).

At a hearing in McAllen, Texas, on February 6, 2019, U.S. District Judge Randy Crane said that the diocese must allow surveyors onto the grounds. If the government didn't reconsider its plan to seize the land, the diocese planned to assert its rights under the Religious Freedom Restoration Act, a federal law that prohibits the government from placing a "substantial burden" on the practice of religion. According to Mary McCord, a Georgetown University ICAP attorney representing the diocese, "a physical barrier that cuts off access to the chapel, and not only to Father Roy and his parish but those who seek to worship there, is clearly a substantial burden on the exercise of religious freedom."

In February 2019, Congress amended an existing appropriations bill, adding language that specifically prohibits new funding from being used to build border barriers at La Lomita and several other properties, including the Santa Ana National Wildlife Refuge, the Bentsen-Rio Grande Valley State Park, the National Butterfly Center, and the area "within or east of" the Vista del Mar Ranch tract of the Lower Rio Grande Valley National Wildlife Refuge. Soon afterwards, however, Trump declared a National Emergency Concerning the Southern Border of the United States, and the White House Counsel claimed that the restrictions contained within the annual appropriations law did not apply, leaving the status of La Lomita and the other sites still in question. On May 24, 2019, a federal judge temporarily blocked the Trump administration's plan to divert funds not explicitly appropriated by Congress. However, on June 3, 2019, another federal judge denied a request by the U.S. House of Representatives to temporarily block spending on the wall.

Although the budget deal ultimately protected the chapel from wall construction, in May 2020, the U.S. Department of Homeland Security notified U.S. Representative Henry Cuellar (Democrat of Texas), the vice-chairman of the United States House Appropriations Subcommittee on Homeland Security, that DHS intended to deploy the Linear Ground Detection System, a "virtual wall" technology, in the Rio Grande Valley, although the department would still need the permission of the chapel to deploy any infrastructure on the property.

== See also ==
- National Register of Historic Places listings in Hidalgo County, Texas
- Recorded Texas Historic Landmarks in Hidalgo County
