= Cavalry of Christ =

Group of Roman Catholic priests

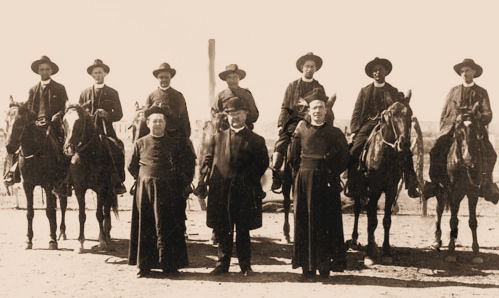
Cavalry of Christ

The Cavalry of Christ were Oblate fathers (Catholic priests belonging to the Missionary Oblates of Mary Immaculate) who traveled long distances on horseback to minister to Catholics living on isolated ranches in the Rio Grande region from 1849 to 1904.

== History ==
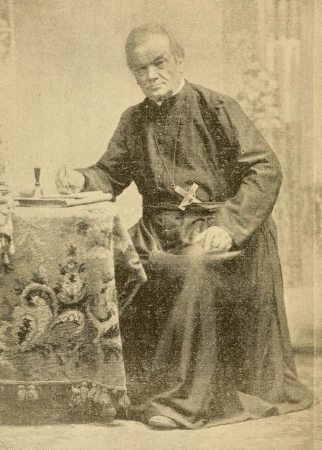
Texas missionary Pierre F. Parisot, circa 1899.

Following the annexation of Texas to the United States, Bishop Jean-Marie Odin invited the Oblates of Mary Immaculate to come to Texas. The priests, a handful of young urban Frenchmen, arrived in 1849. They were tasked with ministering to the eight southernmost counties of Texas. The Rio Grande region at the time exemplified the Wild West, and the Oblates faced many dangers, from violent crime to yellow fever. The Catholics they served were mostly poor, scattered over a vast region prone to oppressive heat and flooding. As they rode their six-week circuits through the harsh terrain, the Oblates were recognizable in their long black soutanes with the Oblate cross hanging from their necks. In addition to administering the sacraments they founded and ran schools in Brownsville and Galveston.

From 1849 through 1851, the mission consisted of three priests, a Brother, and a scholastic who served the Brownsville area. From 1852 through 1883, there were 30 priests and 8 brothers serving hundreds of ranches from three mission centers: Brownsville, Roma, and La Lomita. They also occasionally served parishes in Mexico, including Matamoros, Ciudad Victoria, and Agualeguas. In 1883, the American Oblate Province was established. From 1883 through 1904, a handful of Oblates served the same parts of Texas as well as Eagle Pass and San Antonio. In 1904 they moved their Texas headquarters to San Antonio.

One notable member of the Cavalry of Christ was Father Pierre Yves Kéralum (1817–1872), a French priest and architect who designed the Immaculate Conception Cathedral in Brownsville. Kéralum was also skilled in masonry and carpentry, and laid brick and built church pews and coffins. Known for his humility and kindness, he was dubbed "el Santo Padre Pedrito" by the locals. While in his 50s, in poor health and with failing eyesight, he continued to travel to the more than 70 ranches on his route. Nearly blind, he became lost on several occasions. In 1872 he left a ranch northwest of Mercedes, Texas and never returned. His remains were found in the brush ten years later. Kéralum's memory is still honored by area Catholics. In 1995 the cathedral square in Brownsville was named for Kéralum, and in 2005, local Catholics campaigned to have him canonized.

Father Jean Baptiste Brétault (1843–1934) is also remembered for his 39 years of service. Brétault rode an estimated 70,000 miles serving the area that today comprises Hidalgo, Willacy, Kenedy, and Kleberg counties.

Father Pierre Parisot (1827-1903) founded Saint Joseph's College in Brownsville (now Saint Joseph Academy) and served as pastor there. His 1899 memoir, Reminiscences of a Texas Missionary, describes what life was like for the Oblates at the time; for example, ministering to the family of a small child killed by an alligator; giving the last rites to a Union soldier sentenced to be shot for desertion; and working for the release of several priests who were political prisoners in Matamoros.

== See also ==
· · · ·
