= Eli P. Farmer =

American preacher and politician

Eli Price Farmer
- Born: February 15, 1794; Franklin County, Kentucky, U.S.
- Died: February 5, 1881 (aged 86); Bloomington, Indiana, U.S.
- Occupations: Methodist preacher, businessman, politician, newspaper editor
- Title: Indiana state senator
- Term: 1842–45
- Political party: Whig; Republican
- Movement: Second Great Awakening (Western Revival)
- Spouse(s): Matilda (Allison) Farmer (m. 1822–1825); Elizabeth McClung (m. 1828–1881)
- Parent(s): Sarah (Price) and Joel Farmer

Eli P. Farmer (February 15, 1794 – February 5, 1881) was an American pioneer preacher for the Methodist Episcopal Church and a circuit rider on the Indiana frontier from 1825 to 1839 during the Second Great Awakening. He also served in the Indiana Senate from 1843 to 1845. In addition, the Kentucky native became a Bloomington, Indiana, farmer, editor of the Bloomington Religious Times (later renamed the Western Times), and businessman. Farmer served as a captain in the Kentucky militia during the War of 1812 and as a self-appointed chaplain during the American Civil War.

== Early life and education ==
Eli P. Farmer, the second of Sarah (Price) and Joel Farmer's six children, was born on February 15, 1794, at Dr. Emiss Station in Franklin County, Kentucky, about 5 miles (8.0 km) northwest of Frankfort, Kentucky. His father was of Dutch and Welsh ancestry; his mother had Irish and English ancestors. During Farmer's youth his family frequently moved in search of better economic opportunities. He left home in 1811 at the age of seventeen but occasionally returned to live with his family in Kentucky and Virginia.

Farmer attended his first school at the age of eighteen. Although he learned to read and write, Farmer had no formal religious training. He became a converted Christian in 1812 at a revival-style camp meeting called Gillbad in present-day West Virginia. The event was a turning point in Farmer's life, but he had trouble maintaining a religious life away from the camp meetings and the encouragement of other Christians. His parents did not allow him to offer prayers in their home.

In 1814, during the War of 1812, Farmer served as a captain in the Kentucky militia, but his service ended before his regiment was deployed to defend Washington, D.C. Although his formal education was limited, Farmer ran a school for a short time in Morgantown, West Virginia, after completion of his military service. He closed the school around 1816 or 1817 and returned to Kentucky to pursue other vocations such as farming, carpentry, and hauling millstones down the Ohio River while he continued to attend religious services and camp meetings, and preach on occasion.

Farmer crossed the Ohio River into Indiana around 1820 and settled in Monroe County, Indiana, in 1822. Although he initially intended to preach to Native Americans in Indiana, Farmer changed his plans after deciding to marry. He felt that it was necessary to establish a business to support a wife and future family before entering a full-time Christian ministry.

== Marriage and family ==
Farmer married Matilda H. Allison in October 1822 and settled on land that he had bought near Bloomington, Indiana. They had one child, a son named John Allison Farmer. Matilda Farmer died in 1825.

The widowed Farmer married Elizabeth W. McClung in 1828. They were the parents of several children. To supplement the family income, Elizabeth Farmer spun, knitted, weaved, and made shoes.

== Career ==
Although Farmer engaged in several occupations during his lifetime, he is best known for his service as a pioneer preacher and Methodist circuit rider on the Indiana frontier. In addition to farming and other business ventures, Farmer became a politician and served in the Indiana Senate in Indianapolis from 1843 to 1845. Farmer was also editor of the Bloomington Religious Times, a local newspaper in Bloomington, Indiana. During the American Civil War Farmer was an unofficial, self-appointed chaplain for the Union army and tended to the needs of the soldiers, mostly in Tennessee.

=== Methodist circuit rider ===
Farmer, a converted Christian, was determined to become a preacher in Indiana. Soon after the death of his first wife, Matilda (Allison) Farmer, in 1825, he began preaching in Greene County, Indiana, although he did not serve in an official capacity and was not affiliated with any specific denomination at the time. While working in Greene County in 1825, Farmer established the Bloomfield Circuit and became a circuit-riding preacher. Later that year the Illinois Conference of the Methodist Episcopal Church officially licensed him to preach, formally making him a circuit rider for the circuit he had established. Methodist preachers on the Indiana frontier, where church buildings had not yet been constructed, were assigned to a circuit within a state or territory and met in settlers' log homes, in nearby woods, or at revival gatherings called camp meetings, which Farmer and other circuit riders helped to organize.

Circuit riders such as Farmer could also form new and abandon circuits at will. Farmer officially served as a Methodist circuit rider for nine years. Between 1825 and 1839 he was assigned to Methodist circuits in Indiana that included Bloomfield (1825–26), Vermillion (1826–27), Crawfordsville (1827–28), Washington (1829–30), White Lick (1830–31), Franklin (1831–32), Greencastle (1832–33), and Brown Mission (1837–38), although Farmer did not take an assignment due to ill health during some of these years. His final assignment was at Danville (1838–39) before he returned to his farm in Bloomington, Indiana.

While traveling on the Crawfordsville Circuit in 1827–28, Farmer married Elizabeth McClung and organized the first church in Lafayette, Indiana. This congregation became the present-day Trinity United Methodist Church. Farmer and his wife also spent some time at their rural home near Bloomington, Indiana, due to poor health. During 1828–29 Farmer was so ill that he did not take an official preaching assignment. Family friends persuaded the Farmers to rent out the farm in Bloomington and reside at Fairplay in Greene County, Indiana. By 1829 Farmer had regained his health and resumed work as an itinerant preacher, although he remained in Bloomington for several more years in order to operate a local store that was struggling. By 1836 Farmer was preaching on a part-time basis in Brown County, Indiana, and in 1837 was formally assigned to the Methodist Church's newly established Brown Mission in Brown County. During his year of service at Brown Mission, Farmer reported that 300 members joined its Methodist congregation. In 1838 he received his final appointment to the Danville Circuit. Farmer temporarily resided in Danville, Indiana, before permanently returning to Bloomington in 1839.

During Farmer's years as a circuit rider in the 1820s and 1830s, the Methodist Church experienced significant growth, becoming the dominant religion in Indiana by the 1850s. The Second Great Awakening, which began in the early 1800s, contributed to the significant growth of the Methodist faith and other religious denominations among the early settlers on the frontier, including Presbyterian, Baptist, Christian Church, United Brethren, New Lights, the Cumberland Presbyterian Church, and the Evangelical Association congregations. By 1831, the same year that Farmer reported he had received 550 members while traveling the Franklin Circuit, the Methodist Church claimed it had more than 500,000 members.

After officially serving as a Methodist preacher for nine years, Farmer separated from the Methodist Episcopal Church in 1839 to pursue his idea for a Christian Union, a nonsectarian church. Farmer faced opposition from some church leaders for this decision, but found an ally in Indiana University president Andrew Wylie, who offered the use of the university's chapel on its Bloomington campus for nonsectarian revivals. Farmer's plans for a Christian Union faltered as he became more involved in business and farming ventures, as well as politics and other interests. However, around 1863, Reverend James Fowler Given and others formed a Christian Union in Columbus, Ohio. This Christian Union movement held religious beliefs similar to those espoused by Farmer. Following his return from the American Civil War, Farmer merged his group with the one in Ohio. Christian Union later became recognized as a religious denomination.

=== Businessman ===
During the 1830s, Farmer was involved in farming and several business ventures. He became an investor in a Bloomington general store in the early 1830s and ran a mill. After selling his interest in the store, Farmer acquired a salt works, but sold a portion of his investment when he returned to preaching. After his break with the Methodist Church in 1839, Farmer gave up full-time preaching and ran a couple of brick-making kilns to earn additional income to support his family.

=== Politician ===
Farmer, a Whig who later became a member of the Republican Party, strongly opposed the Indiana Mammoth Internal Improvement Act of 1836. A supporter of the Mexican–American War, he also opposed slavery and those who sympathized with the South. Although Farmer was an unsuccessful candidate for the Indiana Senate in 1836 and the Indiana House of Representatives in 1840, he won a state senate seat in 1842. Farmer served in the Indiana Senate from 1842 to 1845. Following his service in the state legislature, Farmer tried to extend his political career by running for a seat in the U.S. House of Representatives, but he was defeated in 1845 and in 1851.

=== Newspaper editor ===
In 1853 Farmer and two business partners established the Bloomington Religious Times, a weekly newspaper in Bloomington, Indiana. In addition to providing news of the day, it served as a platform for Farmer to describe his religious beliefs and Christian Union plan and was also the official organ of the Republican United Brethren. Its first issue was published on November 11, 1853. Farmer's "rambling" and "sarcastic" prose in his newspaper articles quickly attracted critics. In June 1854 the newspaper's name was changed to the Western Times; the enterprise disbanded the following year.

== Later years ==
Early in the American Civil War Farmer helped recruit at least two companies of volunteer soldiers to serve in the Union army. Farmer also traveled south to meet Union troops and assist with the wounded, mostly in Tennessee. In addition, Farmer acted as an unofficial, self-appointed chaplain during the war. Five of his sons and two sons-in-law served in the Union army. One son was wounded in the war; another son, James, died at his post in Memphis, Tennessee, in December 1865. Farmer returned to Indiana after the war and established a church near his home in Bloomington. In 1874, at the age of eighty, he completed writing his autobiography.

== Death and legacy ==
Farmer died on February 5, 1881, at his home near Bloomington, Indiana, at the age of eighty-eight. An obituary described Farmer as "the Fighting Preacher" because of the strong personality he developed from his life on the frontier and his lack of opposition to participating in physical brawls. However, for much of his life he remained committed to spreading "his vision of religious purity." One religious writer credited Farmer with inspiring thousands to join the Methodist Episcopal Church before he split with them in 1839.

Farmer's lasting legacy includes his autobiography, which documents the details of the Indiana frontier in the 1830s, a time when it was undergoing significant change. He provided descriptions of his daily life as well as his religious conversion and service as an itinerant preacher for the Methodist Episcopal Church during the Second Great Awakening. As the Methodist Episcopal Church underwent dramatic growth and change, Farmer found himself at odds with its leadership, but remained steadfast in his religious beliefs and moved ahead with his plans for a Christian Union of nonsectarian churches. The present-day Christian Union denomination is conservative congregation whose beliefs are based solely on teachings of the Old and New Testaments of the Bible. In addition, a Methodist congregation he organized in 1824 was the first church in Lafayette, Indiana. It continues as the present-day Trinity United Methodist Church.
