= John B. Matthias =

American Methodist minister and circuit rider (1767–1848)

John B. Matthias (January 1, 1767 – May 27, 1848) is known as the writer of the words and music for the gospel song, “Palms of Victory” (also known as “Deliverance Will Come” or “I Saw a Way-worn Traveler”), for which he is generally given credit. He was typical of Methodist Episcopal circuit riders in early 19th Century United States.

== Biography ==
There are two major primary sources for information about his life. First, the minutes of the New York Annual Conference of the Methodist Episcopal Church from 1811 through 1848, especially his official obituary written by his son, the Rev. John J. Matthias Much of the obituary is available on-line in Sacred Memories, or Annals of deceased preachers, etc. The second primary source is John B. Matthias’ personal journal, housed in the United Methodist Archives, Madison, NJ.

John B. Matthias was born January 1, 1767, in Germantown, PA., a post of the British troops, and a field of one of the battles of the revolution. His father was a German emigrant, a firm adherent to the cause of the American Revolution, and a member of the Reformed Dutch Church. John B. was educated in the German language and grew up to be a strong American patriot who spoke frequently about the political privileges enjoyed by U.S. citizens. He learned the trade of a ship-joiner, in Philadelphia, and on the expiration of his apprenticeship he went to New-York.

In New York he began attending John Street Methodist Episcopal Church, where the Rev. John Dickens was pastor. During the 19th century it was common for the bishop to move Methodist ministers every year or two, and Mathias was apparently upset when Dickens was moved, but he warmed to the ministry of Dickens’ successors and became a regular attender. One of these successors, the Rev. Thomas Morrell, was reassigned to the Bowery where he started a congregation known as the Forsyth Street Church. Matthias followed him to that church, where he was converted. A year after his conversion, he married Sarah Jarvis, a member of the John Street Church.

He subsequently felt that God was calling him to preach, and the New York Annual Conference granted him a license to preach in 1793. In 1796 he moved to Tarrytown, New York, where he followed the ship-joiner trade for twelve years while preaching on Sundays (often three times on a Sunday). His son, John J. Matthias, was born at Tarrytown.

The beginning of his ordained ministry is unclear. His obituary indicated that he was ordained as a Deacon in 1797, but the Minutes indicate that he was not admitted “on trial” until 1811, and apparently ordained Deacon in 1812. In any case, he clearly was active in ministry, whether lay or ordained, from 1793 onward. (The Minutes kept no record of lay ministers or their appointments, even though they were a significant part of the development of the early Methodist Episcopal Church. Dixon noted that in 1848, almost half of the clergy in the New York Conference were lay ministers: 254 ministers and 220 local preachers.)

The obituary indicates that he had hoped to be appointed as a full-time minister in 1810, but he was married with a family, and the church officials preferred young single men for the arduous work of circuit riding. Since there were enough such single ministers in the New York Conference, Matthias was passed over, much to his disappointment. Then, in the fall of 1810, he was asked to take responsibility for a circuit where the appointed minister had become ill. A layman from Rhinebeck, NY, gave him a horse, and he began his full-time ministry. For the next 30 years he served as minister on circuits up and down the Hudson River valley from just north of New York City to Schenectady.

We don't have good records of the boundaries of the circuits, but their size is suggested by one bit of data: In 1814–1815, Matthias served two years on the Albany circuit (apparently not including the main congregation in Albany, but possibly including another, smaller congregation in the city), and one of the congregations on this circuit was Windham, more than 20 miles (32 km) south.

In 1840 Matthias had such a serious problem with cataracts that he could not see well enough to guide his horse, so for his last year of active ministry, his wife had to accompany him on the circuit. At the 1841 meeting of the New York Annual Conference he received a superannuated relation (i.e., retired), and resided at his son's home on Hempstead, L. I. until his death on May 27, 1848. At his death, his son, John J. Matthias, was attending the infamous Methodist Episcopal General Conference of 1848, at which the decision was made to split the denomination over the issue of slavery, and was called home from Pittsburgh via the telegraph.

John B. Matthias also had a grandson who was a Methodist minister, Rev. Benjamin M. Adams, and it is possible that some traditions about the elder Matthias were never documented, but were passed down through the family. This could be the basis for the attribution that he is author of “Palms of Victory.”

During his years of retirement, Matthias received a pension based on whatever congregation members in the New York Conference contributed that year. The Minutes indicate that his annual pension ranged between $86.40 and $157.28.
