= Pierre Yves Kéralum =

American architect (1817–1872)

- Born: March 2, 1817; Quimper, Brittany, France
- Died: November 12, 1872 (aged 55); Mercedes, Texas, U.S.
- Other names: Peter Keralum
- Occupations: Catholic priest, architect

Pierre Yves Kéralum OMI (March 2, 1817 – November 12, 1872) was a French-born American Catholic missionary and architect. He was member of the Missionary Oblates of Mary Immaculate and served in South Texas from 1853 to 1872, traveling long distances on horseback to minister to Catholics living on isolated ranches along the Rio Grande. He was also an architect who designed many buildings in the area, including the Immaculate Conception Cathedral in Brownsville, Texas.

== Early life and education ==
Pierre Yves Kéralum was born in the Brittany region of France on March 2, 1817, the youngest of ten children of Marc Yves Kéralum, a carpenter, and Jeanne Colcanap. As an apprentice carpenter and cabinetmaker, he was making his traditional Tour de France when he was called to the priesthood. He studied at the Pont-Croix minor seminary, then entered the Quimper major seminary in 1847. He was ordained a deacon in 1850. After deciding to join the Missionary Oblates of Mary Immaculate, he began his novitiate at Notre-Dame-de-l'Osier in 1851, and spent several months at the Marseille major seminary. He was ordained a priest by the Bishop of Marseille, Eugène de Mazenod, on February 15, 1852, and was sent to Galveston, Texas.

== Priesthood ==
Kéralum spent nine months in Galveston, where he helped establish the city's first Catholic college-seminary. Originally named Immaculate Conception College and Seminary, it was chartered in 1856 as St. Mary's University of Galveston. In 1853, he was transferred to Brownsville, Texas, where he began serving as a circuit rider for the Lower Rio Grande Valley.

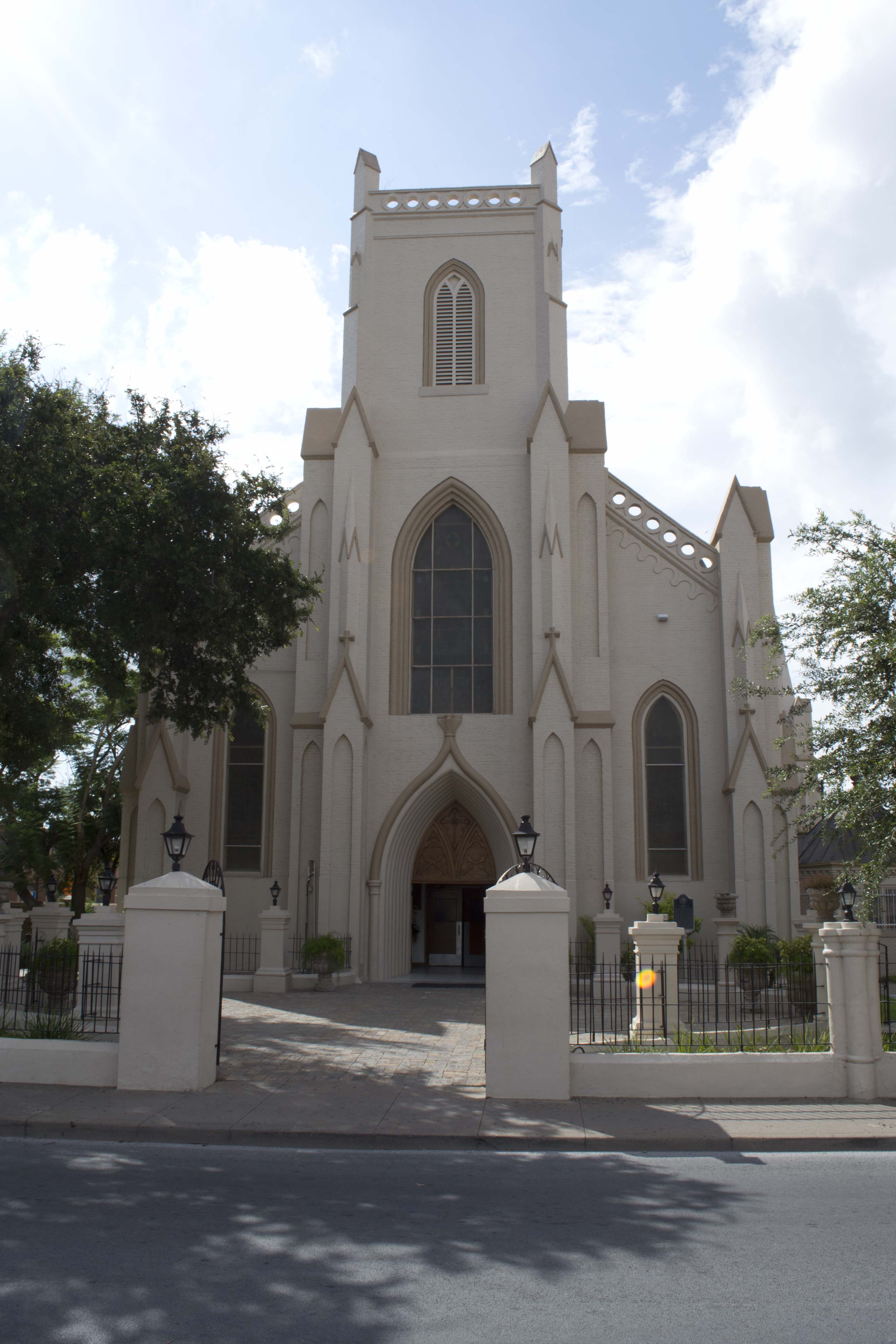
Immaculate Conception Church in Brownsville, Texas.

=== Architectural work ===
In addition to carpentry, Kéralum was skilled in masonry and could lay brick as well as building church pews, coffins, and whatever else was needed. In 1854, he was briefly transferred to the mission center in Roma, Texas, where he designed and helped build the parish church. Our Lady of Refuge Catholic Church is still in use and is part of the Roma Historic District.

In 1856, the priest originally in charge of building the Immaculate Conception Cathedral in Brownsville, Father Verdet, was returning from a trip to France when he was drowned in a shipwreck off the Louisiana coast. Father Kéralum was assigned to take over for him. The Gothic Revival church is still in use today and is listed in the National Register of Historic Places. Kéralum designed and helped with the construction of many other buildings in the Brownsville mission district.

In 1872, he helped the priests in Laredo, Texas, finish building the Cathedral of San Agustin. He designed Our Lady of Visitation Church in Santa Maria, another Gothic Revival edifice, and St. Joseph's chapel at the Toluca Ranch in Progreso. He may also have designed La Lomita Chapel in Mission, Texas.

=== Cavalry of Christ ===
The Oblate fathers who ministered to the Rio Grande area in the 19th century were known as the Cavalry of Christ because they traveled by horseback. The priests traveled over harsh desert and through lawless territory to administer the sacraments to Catholics living on small, far-flung ranches. Father Kéralum was one of the best known and beloved members of this group. At least three times a year he covered a large territory spanning 70-120 ranches, where he would preach, catechize young people, hear confessions, and perform wedding and funeral rites. He also crossed the Rio Grande to preach at several Mexican missions in 1865. Known for his kindness and humility, he was called "El Santo Padre Pedrito" by the locals.

Stories about Kéralum illustrate his consideration for others. Once when he arrived at the Brownsville rectory late at night, he camped out in the graveyard rather than wake anyone. He preferred to wear second-hand clothes rather than spend money on new ones. A neighbor once saw him carrying lumber and tools into a shack on the outskirts of town; on investigation, it turned out that Kéralum was building a coffin for the impoverished woman who had died there.

While in his fifties, Kéralum's health began to fail and he became nearly blind. Nevertheless he insisted on continuing his rounds, and on several occasions lost his way. Once he returned covered with mesquite scratches after having become lost in the brush and survived for three days on mesquite beans and prickly pear.

On November 12, 1872, Kéralum left the Cano family ranch, northwest of Mercedes, Texas, and never returned. His horse turned up a few days later without its saddle. The Oblates formed a search party and scoured the area for days, but found no trace of him. For a time it was rumored that he had been murdered. In 1882 some cowhands found his remains in the brush, identifiable by his belongings: a rosary fragment, a chalice and other ceremonial items, and an old saddle hanging from a tree limb. Apparently he had died of snakebite or become hopelessly lost in the desert and starved to death.

== Memorials ==
Stained-glass window at Our Lady of Guadalupe Catholic Church in Mission, Texas.

Kéralum's memory is still honored by area Catholics. A life-size crucifixion scene, erected in 1920, marks the spot in Mercedes where his remains were originally interred before being transferred to San Antonio, Texas. The city of Roma has hosted an annual Kéralum festival, and in 2004 celebrated the 150th anniversary of the Oblates' arrival with a reenactment of the scene on horseback. A Knights of Columbus chapter and several streets and buildings in the region have been named for him. In 1995 the cathedral square in Brownsville was named for Kéralum.

In 2003, Vatican officials visited the area and were impressed with the respect for Kéralum that had been passed down from the original ranching families. Rev. Roy Snipes of Our Lady of Guadalupe Catholic Church in Mission, Texas, presented the visitors with a recording of a corrido, or Mexican folk ballad, written in Kéralum's honor. A member of the Fernandez family from Toluca Ranch wrote a history which Snipes adapted into a play about Kéralum, which is performed once a year at La Lomita Chapel. The Missionary Oblates of Mary Immaculate, supported by Bp. Daniel Flores of the Diocese of Brownsville, are prayerfully promoting his causes to be declared a saint by our Catholic church.

Author Paul Horgan wrote a fictionalized account of Kéralum's last days titled The Devil in the Desert (1952).
