= Jeffrey Glassberg =

American biologist and author

Jeffrey Glassberg is an American biologist and author. Following a distinguished academic career he pioneered and patented work in DNA Fingerprinting. Later he founded the North American Butterfly Association (NABA) and is the leading proponent of moving interest in butterflies from hobbyist collecting and nets to butterflying with binoculars and cameras. He has written a number of field guides as well as numerous articles.

== Life ==
=== Early life ===
Jeffrey Glassberg was born in Brooklyn, New York, on November 27, 1947, where his family lived until 1952 when they moved to Long Island, New York. His father established his own company making automobile seat covers and his mother worked there as well. Glassberg's early years were devoted to nature; bird-watching, chasing butterflies, and, with his younger brother, to chemistry experimentation. Moving from the buildings of New York City to a place of forests and meadows on Long Island where his parents allowed him to roam stimulated his interest and love of nature which continues.

=== Family life ===
Jeffrey Glassberg met his future wife, Jane Scott, in a seminar course on bacteriophage lambda at Rice University. When he moved to Stanford University School of Medicine in 1972, she accompanied him and was a post-doctoral fellow at the University of California, San Francisco. In 1979 they both moved to Rockefeller University, where she worked on virology in the laboratory of Purnell W. Choppin.

== Education and academic career ==
Glassberg graduated from Tufts University School of Engineering with a degree in civil engineering in 1969, but turned to biology after travels to South America with a colleague to study butterflies. He took summer biology courses and taught high school biology on the North Shore of Long Island, before acceptance into the graduate program at Rice University, Houston, Texas, in 1972. Glassberg received his PhD in biology from Rice University in 1977, working on the genetics of bacteriophage SP01 DNA replication in the laboratory of Charlie Stewart. He then spent three years in the Biochemistry Department at the Stanford University School of Medicine where he was a post-doctoral fellow in Arthur Kornberg's laboratory doing research on DNA-binding proteins. Glassberg moved to Rockefeller University, New York City in 1979 and worked on creating a genetic system using the eukaryote, Crithidia fasciculata, a trypanosomatid parasite of mosquitos.

== DNA Profiling (DNA Fingerprinting) ==
Glassberg continued his scientific work as one of the founders of ACTAGEN (an acronym for advanced clinical testing and genetics) in March 1982. This company, renamed as Lifecodes played a major role in the early period of DNA fingerprinting. This included providing the test cases for the first court trials in the United States as well as the first training of F.B.I. personnel in DNA forensics. One of the first F.B.I. scientists trained was Bruce Budowle, a Senior Scientist, who initially headed the F.B.I.'s effort in this area and who later became the Executive Director of the Institute of Applied Genetics at the Univ. of North Texas health Science Center, Ft. Worth, Texas.

Glassberg is the inventor on the patent "Method for forensic analysis" (US 5593832 A), with a priority date of February 28, 1983. From the abstract: "This invention relates to a method for identification of samples collected as physical evidence for forensic analysis. The identification is based upon an analysis of DNA length polymorphisms generated by the action of restriction endonucleases." Versions of this patent was applied for in a number of countries and in most was granted in 1984. The US patent went through a number of extensions and was finally granted on January 14, 1997.

- Belgium as BE899027A1, filing No. 899.027, priority date of February 28, 1983 was granted August 28, 1984. "Essai Pour la Détermination é La Paternité et Pour L'Etablissement de L'Identite Genetique Individuelle" . (English: "Test for the determination of paternity and the establishment of the individual genetic identity"). Glassberg was the inventor on this patent.
- Canada as CA1215304 A with application number CA 448439, with a priority date February 28, 1983 was granted December 16, 1986. "". (English: "Test for the determination of paternity and the establishment of individual identity"). Glassberg was the inventor on this patent.
- France as FR2541774A1 application number FR2541774A1 "Essai Pour la Détermination é La Paternité et Pour L'Etablissement de L'Identite Genetique Individuelle". (English: "Test for the determination of paternity and for the establishment of individual genetic identity").
- Germany as DE3407196 A1, with a priority date of February 28, 1983 and granted August 30, 1984. "Verfahren zur identifizierung einzelner mitglieder einer spezies von organismen " (English: "A method of identifying individual members of a species of organisms "). Glassberg was the inventor on this patent.
- Great Britain as granted as GB8405107D0, filing as GB2135774A, with Priority Date 2018-02-23 was granted April 4, 1984. "Identification of individual members of a species". Glassberg was the inventor on this patent.
- Japan as Application JPS59199000A with a priority date 1983-02-28. "Determination of master system and establishment of indivisual [sic] hereditary identity".
- United States as US5593832A with a priority date of February 28, 1983 and granted January 14, 1997. "Method for forensic analysis". Glassberg was the inventor on this patent.

Glassberg was also co-author on related papers including:

- "Application of Deoxyribonucleic Acid (DNA) Polymorphisms to the Analysis of DNA Recovered from Sperm"
- "The Application of DNA-Print for the Estimation of Paternity"
- "Application of DNA Polymorphisms to the Forensic Examination of Semen"
- "Allele frequency distribution of two highly polymorphic DNA sequences in three ethnic groups and its application to the determination of paternity"

In 1986 the founders of Lifecodes, John Ford, Ronald Dorazio and Jeffrey Glassberg sold Lifecodes Corporation to Quantum Chemical Corporation.

== Return to Education ==
Following his work with DNA fingerprinting, Glassberg went to Columbia Law School, graduating in 1993 with his Doctor of Jurisprudence (J.D.) .

He is an adjunct faculty member at Rice University in the department of Ecology & Evolutionary Biology Graduate Program Faculty.

== Conservation with butterflies ==
In November 1992, Glassberg founded the North American Butterfly Association to engage the public in the support of conservation.

As president he has been a driving force behind NABA's growth, including the founding of the National Butterfly Center in southern Texas.

== Field guides ==
He is the author of seven butterfly field guides that use photographs of live butterflies, in addition to initiating and editing a field guide to dragonflies and one to wildflowers.

Glassberg was the first to write a butterfly field guide intended for readers to identify butterflies using binoculars. "His new book, Butterflies Through Binoculars: A Field Guide to Butterflies in the Boston-New York-Washington Region, published this year by Oxford University Press, is the first to focus on netless butterflying." "His own Butterflies through Binoculars, published in 1993, is credited with revolutionizing the pursuit of butterflies with its emphasis on observation in the field".

In 1999, Robert Robbins, then chair of the Department of Entomology at the Smithsonian Institution's National Museum of Natural History, stated that "Glassberg's butterfly guides have provided a new way for amateur naturalists to identify species without collecting them or dissecting them. Previously, he said, butterfly books distinguished between species using technical, almost microscopic details. But in Mr. Glassberg's years of field observation, Dr. Robbins said, he has found variations in the way butterflies appear that allow species – or the sex of individuals of a species – to be distinguished simply by looking. The option of just watching butterflies and understanding what you're seeing just wasn't there before".

Glassberg's 2001 book, Butterflies Through Binoculars: The West received first place in the nature guidebook category of the 2001 National Outdoor Book Awards.

== Books ==
=== as sole author ===
- Butterflies through Binoculars: The Boston-New York-Washington Region. New York: Oxford Univ. Press, 1993.
- Butterflies through Binoculars: The East. New York: Oxford Univ. Press, 1999.
- Butterflies through Binoculars: The West. New York: Oxford Univ. Press, 2000.
- Butterflies of North America. New York: Friedman/Fairfax, 2002.
- A Swift Guide to Butterflies of Mexico and Central America. New Jersey: Sunstreak Books, 2007.
- A Swift Guide to Butterflies of North America. New Jersey: Sunstreak Books, 2012.
- Enjoying Butterflies More. Marietta: Bird Watchers Digest Press, 2013.

=== as co-author ===
- Butterflies through Binoculars: Florida. Jeffrey Glassberg, Marc C. Minno, and John V. Calhoun. New York: Oxford Univ. Press, 2000.
- Birds of North America. Tom Wood, Sheri Williams, Jeffrey Glassberg. New York: Sterling Publishing Co., 2005.
- Caterpillars in the Field and Gardens: A Field Guide to the Butterfly Caterpillars of North America. Thomas J. Allen, Jim P. Brock, and Jeffrey Glassberg. New York: Oxford Univ. Press, 2005.

=== as editor ===
- Dragonflies through Binoculars: North America. Sidney W. Dunkle. New York: Oxford Univ. Press, 2000.
- Wildflowers in the Field and Forest. Steven Clements and Carol Gracie. New York: Oxford Univ. Press, 2006.
