= Benjamin Adams (politician) =

American politician from Massachusetts (1764–1837)

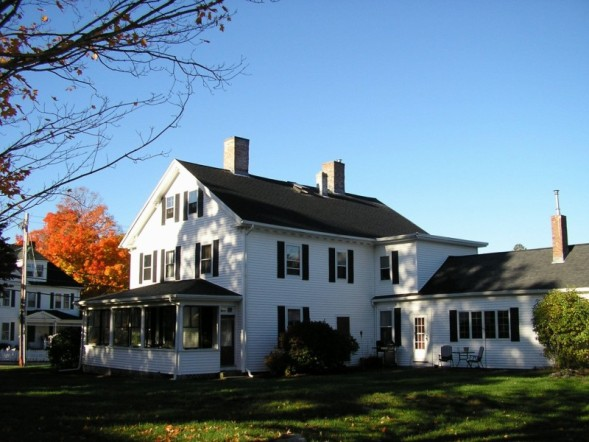

Member of the U.S. House of Representatives from Massachusetts's 11th district
- In office December 2, 1816 – March 3, 1821
- Preceded by: Elijah Brigham
- Succeeded by: Jonathan Russell

Personal details
- Born: December 16, 1764 Mendon, Province of Massachusetts Bay, British America
- Died: March 28, 1837 (aged 72) Uxbridge, Massachusetts, U.S.
- Resting place: Prospect Hill Cemetery, Uxbridge
- Party: Federalist
- Education: Brown University
- Profession: Lawyer

Benjamin Adams (December 16, 1764 – March 28, 1837) was an American lawyer and politician.

== Early life ==
Adams was born in Mendon in the Province of Massachusetts Bay on December 16, 1764, son of Josiah Adams, an uncle to President John Adams, and Sarah Reed. He grew up in Mendon, which was then a rural agricultural community. Adams was well educated by existing public schools in that community.

== College and practice of law ==
He graduated from Brown University in Providence, Rhode Island in 1788, where he studied law, receiving his A.M. degree in course. He was admitted to the Massachusetts Bar, and began the practice of the law in Uxbridge, Massachusetts.

== Political career ==
He was elected to the Massachusetts House of Representatives from 1809 to 1814, later winning election to the Massachusetts Senate in 1814 through 1815. In 1816, he was elected to the United States House of Representatives from Massachusetts in the 14th, 15th, and 16th congresses, having been elected first to fill the vacancy caused by the death of Elijah Brigham in 1816 and serving in that body until 1821, were succeeded by Jonathan Russell. In 1822 he was then reelected to the Massachusetts State Senate and served there through 1825.

== Death and afterward ==
He died in Uxbridge, Worcester County, Massachusetts, on March 28, 1837. The Benjamin Adams House is on the National Register of Historic Places in Uxbridge. The house is located at 85 North Main Street, near the "Uxbridge Common Historic District." Benjamin Adams is buried in the Prospect Hill Cemetery, next to the historic Capron Mill in downtown Uxbridge. Another elected Congressman is buried there, Phineas Bruce, as well as a Medal of Honor recipient from this town, Corporal Edward Sullivan. Benjamin Adams would have seen the early history and successes of the adjacent Capron Mill, and the beginnings of American industrialization which occurred there. On July 21, 2007, the historic Capron Mill, later known as the Bernat Mill, was burned in a spectacular ten-alarm fire. A housing development and street there is named in his honor today.

== See also ==
- List of Registered Historic Places in Uxbridge, Massachusetts
- Benjamin Adams House

== Sources ==
- United States Congress. "Benjamin Adams (id: A000030)". Biographical Directory of the United States Congress.

U.S. House of Representatives
| Preceded by Elijah Brigham | Member of the U.S. House of Representatives from Massachusetts's 11th congressional district December 2, 1816 – March 3, 1821 | Succeeded by Johnathan Russell |
