= Bentsen-Rio Grande Valley State Park =

Texas state park

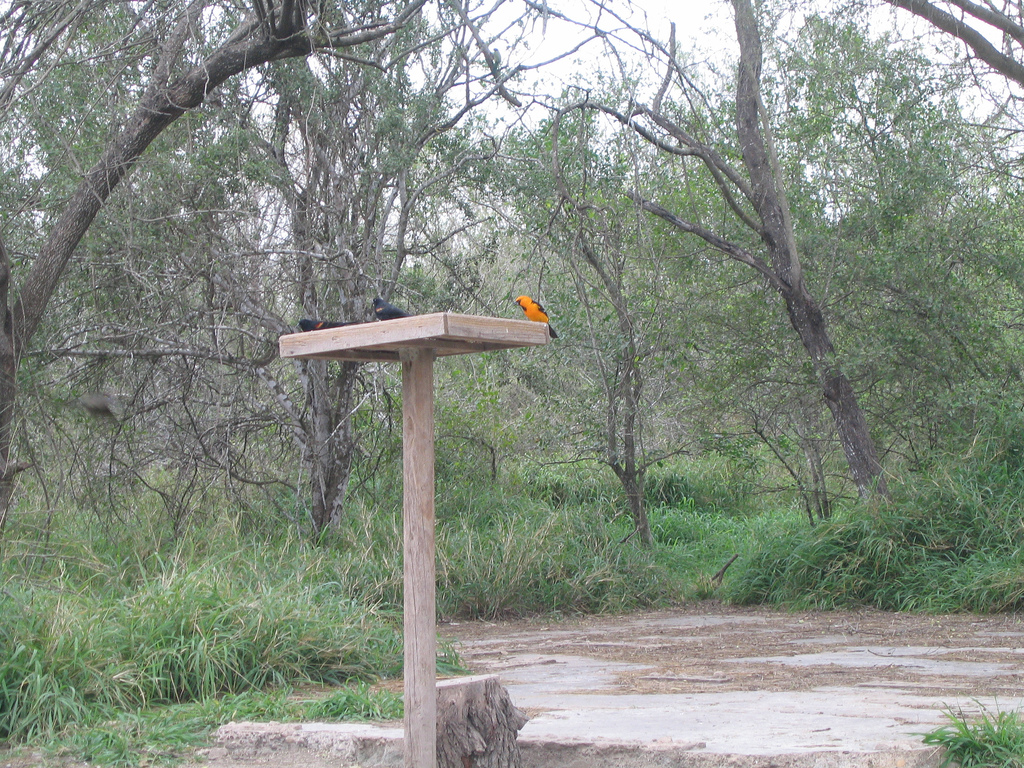
- An Altamira oriole at a feeder in Bentsen-Rio Grande Valley State Park

- Location within Texas Location within the United States
- Location: Hidalgo County, Texas, United States
- Nearest city: Mission
- Coordinates: 26°10′23″N 98°22′57″W
- Area: 764 acres (309 ha)
- Established: January 28, 1944
- Visitors: 31,287 (in 2025)
- Governing body: Texas Parks and Wildlife Department
- Website: Official site

Bentsen-Rio Grande Valley State Park is a 764-acre (309 ha) state park in Mission, Texas, United States. It is managed by the Texas Parks and Wildlife Department and serves as the headquarters for the World Birding Center.

== History ==
The park had its beginnings on January 28, 1944, when the parents of Senator Lloyd Bentsen, Lloyd M. Bentsen Sr. and his wife Edna Ruth Bentsen, along with Elmer and Marie Bentsen, donated 586 acres (237 ha) of land to the State Parks Board for a nature habitat. The park currently encompasses 764 acres (309 ha).

The park is a prime area for birdwatching and butterfly watching. When Bentsen–Rio Grande Valley State Park became the headquarters of the World Birding Center's network of nine sites in 2004, vehicular traffic was banned and RV camping was discontinued. More than 325 species of birds and over 250 species of butterflies have been recorded in the park. The park is particularly popular among butterfly watchers. The North American Butterfly Association operates the National Butterfly Center adjacent to the park.

== See also ==
- List of Texas state parks
- Museums in South Texas
- National Register of Historic Places listings in Hidalgo County, Texas
