= North American Butterfly Association =

U.S. nonprofit organization

- Abbreviation: NABA
- Formation: 1992; 34 years ago
- Type: Nonprofit
- Tax ID no.: 13-3689481
- Legal status: 501(c)(3)
- Headquarters: Morristown, New Jersey
- Executive Director: Stacy Cohen
- President: Jeffrey Glassberg
- Website: naba.org

The North American Butterfly Association (NABA) was created in 1992 by Jeffrey Glassberg who is the association's president. The NABA was formed in order to promote awareness of butterfly conservation and the benefits of butterfly gardening, observation, photography and education.

As with the National Audubon Society and the Christmas Bird Count, the NABA holds annual volunteer butterfly counts in the weeks leading up to or after July 4 in the United States, July 1 in Canada, and September 16 in Mexico. Volunteers scout out a meeting place and map out a 15-mile circle in which they count all the butterflies they see in one day. These counts give clues into the butterfly biodiversity of a particular region.

NABA also publishes the American Butterflies magazine quarterly. The magazine is currently 48 pages long and includes color photographs and articles on butterfly "hot spots", identification, gardening, photography, book reviews and regular features and columns.

NABA's 23 chapters across 14 states convene regular member meetings, field trips, butterfly monitoring counts and educational events to engage community members. States include Arizona, California, Florida, Kentucky, Massachusetts, Missouri, New Jersey, New York, Ohio, Oregon, South Carolina, Tennessee, Texas, Wisconsin.

== See also ==
- National Butterfly Center
- Butterfly Conservation (UK group)
