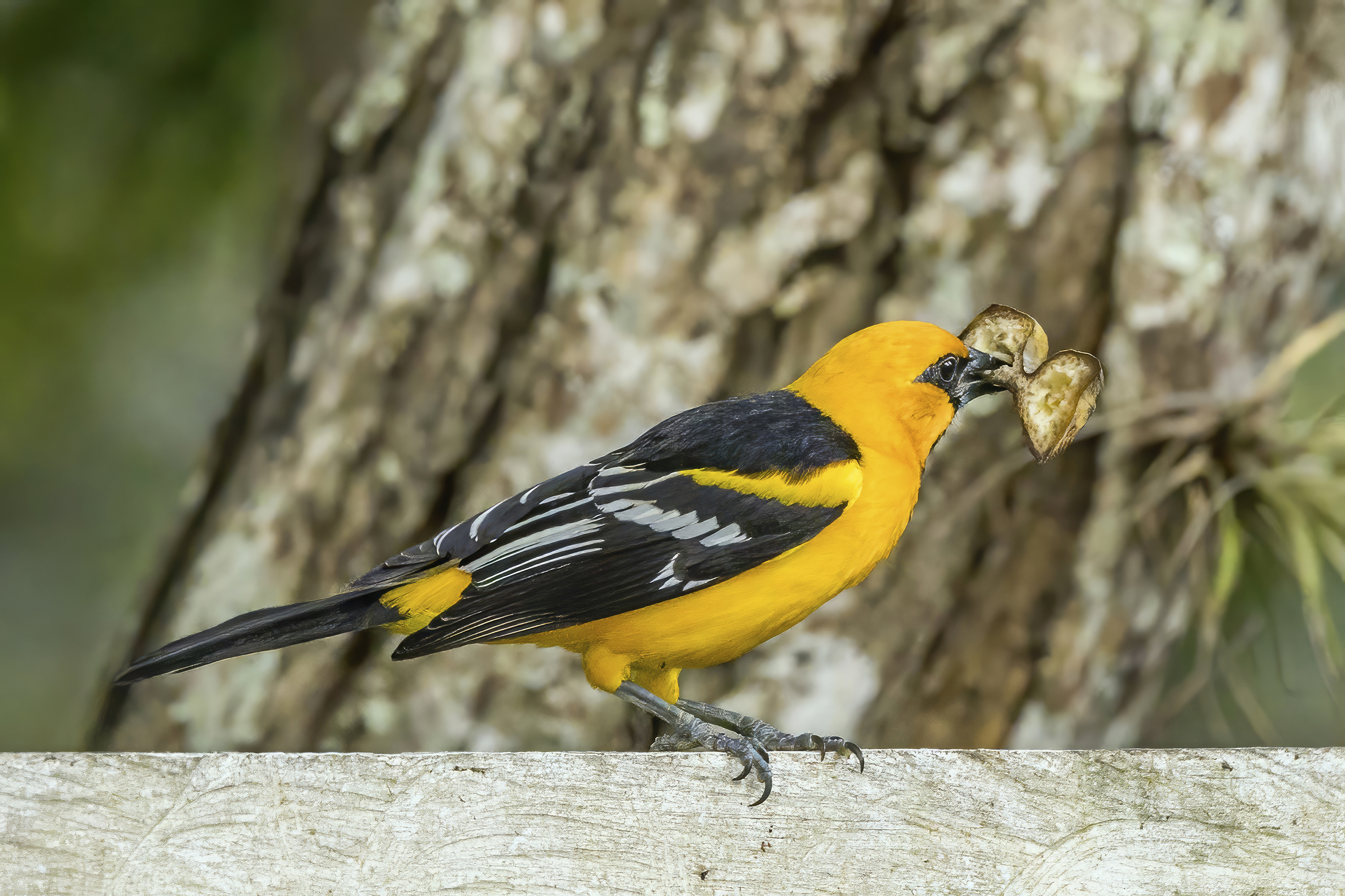
- Icterus gularis gigas Honduras

Conservation status
- Least Concern (IUCN 3.1)

Scientific classification
- Kingdom: Animalia
- Phylum: Chordata
- Class: Aves
- Order: Passeriformes
- Family: Icteridae
- Genus: Icterus
- Species: I. gularis

Binomial name
- Icterus gularis (Wagler, 1829)
- Range of I. gularis Year-round range

= Altamira oriole =

Species of bird

The Altamira oriole (Icterus gularis) is a New World oriole. The bird is widespread in subtropical lowlands of the Mexican Gulf Coast and northern Central America, the Pacific coast and inland. They have since spread to southern Texas, but this was not until 1939.

At 25 cm (9.8 in) and 56 g (2.0 oz), this is the largest oriole in genus Icterus. The bird nests in open woodland, with the nest being a very long woven pouch, attached to the end of a horizontal tree branch, sometimes to telephone wires.

This bird forages high in trees, sometimes in the undergrowth. They mainly eat insects and berries.

These birds are permanent residents, and unlike the migratory orioles that breed in the US, the species is sexually monomorphic—both the males and the females have elaborate coloration and patterning.

== Description ==
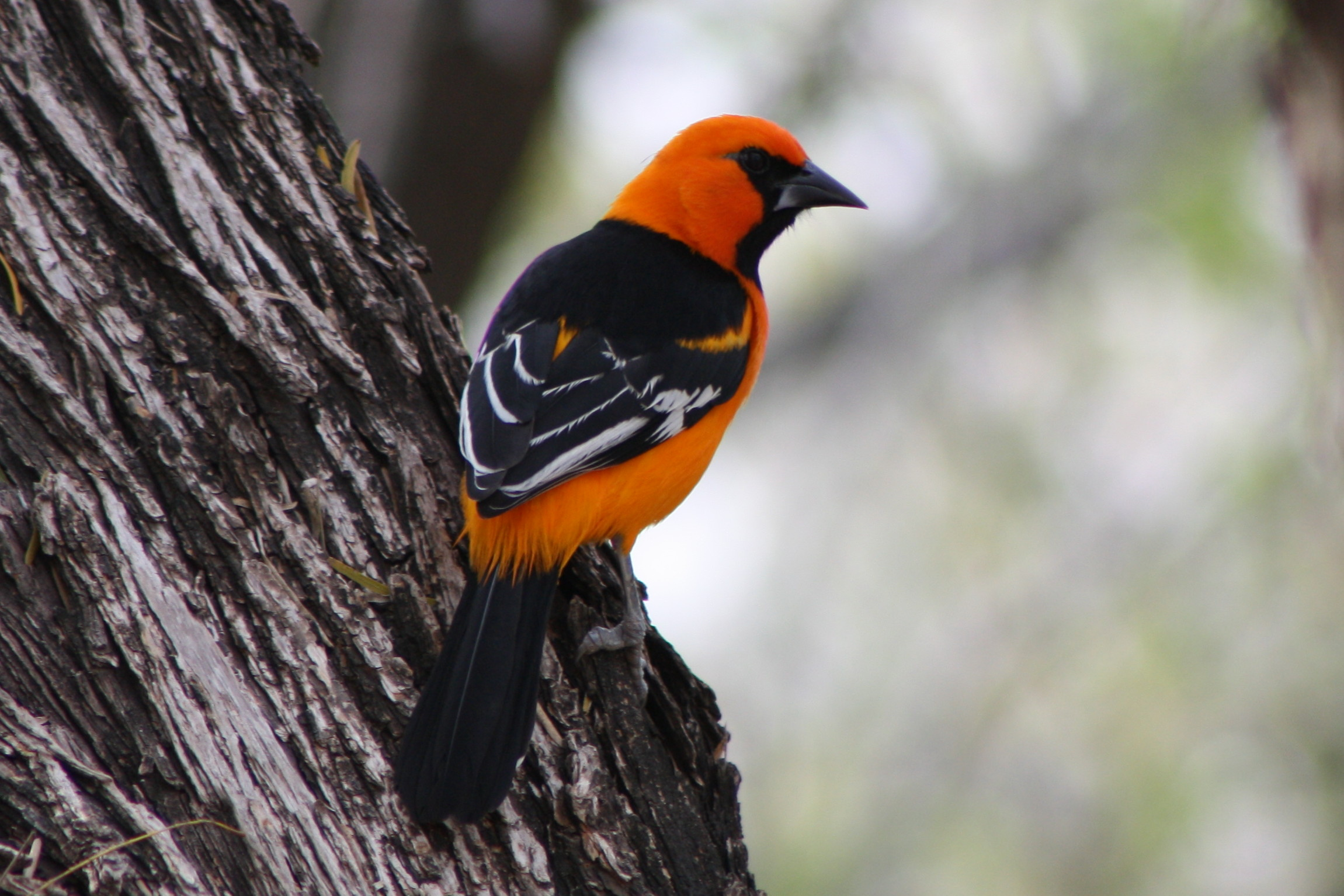
In Bentsen State Park, Texas, US

Both males and females have a black mandible and throat, as well as a black back and long black tail. Wings are black, but the remiges and rectrices (flight feathers) are fringed with white. These form a single white wing bar and white wing spots when folded. The secondary coverts form orange epaulets. The underside is almost uniformly orange or yellowish-orange. In general, immature specimens have an olive back, and a dull yellow on its head and its body. The first-year bird is similar to the adult, but it has an olive, not black, back, and yellow-olive tail.

== Behavior ==
The bird lives in semi-arid areas with scattered trees, and open riparian woodland. The bird is a solitary nester as well, with an average of a quarter kilometer between nests. Little aggression has been observed in breeding season from this bird, and it is not known to be territorial.

=== Reproduction ===
In Texas, their breeding season ranges from late April to late July. Their nest resembles a small pouch made of moss, grass, palm fibers, weeds, strips of bark, and is lined with feathers. The nest may also hang from telephone wires. The nest is assumed to be built by the female, but it is not known how long this takes. 4–6 eggs are laid, and nestlings are fed and cared for by both parents.

=== Diet ===
The Altamira oriole is a forage gleaner, searching for food through the tree-tops to the near-ground bottom of the tree. Its diet includes fruit (small fruits, hackberries and figs) and insects, such as grasshoppers, crickets, and caterpillars.

=== Voice ===
The song of the Altamira oriole is a series of clear, slow musical whistles. In contrast, the Altamira's calls are harsh whistles, rasping chatter, and nasal "ike"s.
