= Palms of Victory =

Gospel song

- Genre: Hymn
- Written: 1836
- Text: John B. Matthias
- Based on: Revelation 7:9
- Composed: 1836

"Palms of Victory", also called "Deliverance Will Come", "The Blood-washed Pilgrim", and "The Way-worn Traveler", is a Christian hymn that appears to have been written in 1836 by John B. Matthias, a Methodist Episcopal minister in New York State.

== Authorship ==
"Palms of Victory" appears to have been written by someone in particular, rather than having been the development of a community of folk singers, because it is a sophisticated song with complex verses that tell a consistent story. George Pullen Jackson notes that spiritual folk songs arising from a community feature a "progressive simplification of the text".

In 1886, William McDonald published Songs of Joy and Gladness, which included "Deliverance Will Come" as hymn #214. Then, in 1909, the song was included in New Songs of the Gospel as hymn #267, and that publication claimed that they had received permission from McDonald. As the song had been published prior to this book, however, it is clear that McDonald did not write it.

Ten years before New Songs of the Gospel, "Palms of Victory" had been published in an independent gospel songbook, and seven years earlier, the song had been published in a Mennonite songbook, Church and Sunday-school Hymnal, hymn #132. In both the 1899 and 1902 books, credit for words and music are given to John B. Matthias, with no mention of McDonald's arrangement. There is hardly any difference in the music between the 1902 and 1909 publications, and the only difference in the words is that the 1909 publication omits stanza 3 as found in the 1902 publication.

Wayne Erbsen refers to research done by Gus Meade, concluding that Matthias wrote "Palms of Victory".

== History of use ==
"Palms of Victory" has been published in several "standard" hymnals, between 1900 and 1966: the Methodist Cokesbury Worship Hymnal of 1923 (hymn no. 142, as "Deliverance Will Come"), the Mennonite Church and Sunday-school Hymnal of 1902 (hymn no. 132), the Nazarene Glorious Gospel Hymns of 1931 (hymn no. 132, as "The Bloodwashed Pilgrim"), the African Methodist Episcopal hymnal of 1954, and the National Baptist Convention hymnal of 1924 (hymn #333). In 1893, it was included in the Seventh-day Adventist hymnal as #1145. An informal survey of late-19th century and early-20th century gospel song books found the song included in a small number of collections. More recent research shows that it was included in 96 hymnals between 1875 and 1965.

Emmylou Harris, Dolly Parton, and Linda Ronstadt recorded the song in their first-attempt sessions of the album Trio. Recorded in 1978, the song went unreleased until Harris' 2007 compilation album, Songbird: Rare Tracks and Forgotten Gems.

In the early 1920s, the song was recorded by the Carter Family and by Uncle Dave Macon.

In 1962 or 1963, Bob Dylan picked it up, changed the words, and wrote "Paths of Victory", which he sang on a Westinghouse television special. Dylan's version was published in Broadside magazine and later recorded by other artists.

In 1995, the "Bloodwashed Pilgrim" version of the song was recorded by Crystal Lewis and included on her album entitled Hymns: My Life.

The University of California has several fight songs, one of which is sometimes called "Palms of Victory" and includes the words "Palms of victory we will win for Alma Mater true." This is not the gospel song but instead takes its melody from a minstrel song known as "Springtime in Dixieland", or "Happy Days in Dixieland".

Wayne Erbsen notes that the tune was used for a protest song called "Pans of Biscuits", with the chorus lyrics being "Pans of biscuits, bowls of gravy/Pans of biscuits we shall have."

It was recorded by Guy Penrod when he was a member of the Gaither Vocal Band, a Southern Gospel Group led by Bill Gaither. The song was featured in at least one Gaither Homecoming video title, The Hawaiian Homecoming.

== Lyrics and variations ==
=== Way-worn traveler variation ===
The words, as found in the 1902 publication, are as follows:

Deliverance Will Come

I saw a wayworn traveler, in tattered garments clad,
And struggling up the mountain, it seemed that he was sad;
His back was laden heavy, his strength was almost gone,
Yet he shouted as he journeyed, "Deliverance will come!"
Then palms of victory, crowns of glory,
Palms of victory I shall wear.

The summer sun was shining, the sweat was on his brow,
His garments worn and dusty, his step seemed very slow;
But he kept pressing onward, for he was wending home,
Still shouting as he journeyed, "Deliverance will come!"
Then palms of victory, crowns of glory,
Palms of victory I shall wear.

The songsters in the arbor that stood beside the way
Attracted his attention, inviting his delay:
His watchword being "Onward!" he stopped his ears and ran,
Still shouting as he journeyed, "Deliverance will come!"
Then palms of victory, crowns of glory,
Palms of victory I shall wear.

I saw him in the evening; the sun was bending low;
He'd overtopped the mountain, and reached the vale below:
He saw the Golden City, "his everlasting home"
And shouted loud, "Hosanna! Deliverance will come!"
Then palms of victory, crowns of glory,
Palms of victory I shall wear.

While gazing on that city, just o'er the narrow flood,
A band of holy angels came from the throne of God;
They bore him on their pinions safe o'er the dashing foam,
And joined him in his triumph: Deliverance had come!
Then palms of victory, crowns of glory,
Palms of victory I shall wear.

I heard the song of triumph they sang upon that shore,
Saying, "Jesus has redeemed us to suffer nevermore!"
Then casting his eyes backward on the race which he had run,
He shouted loud, "Hosanna! Deliverance has come!"
Then palms of victory, crowns of glory,
Palms of victory I shall wear.

Additional stanzas were published in the 1888 Songs of Pilgrimage: A Hymnal for the Churches of Christ:

His eyes were dim and heavy, his body weak and way,
Therefore his Brother gave him a couch to lie upon;
And closed the blinds around him, and locked him up alone,
That nothing might disturb him, till deliverance should come.

Hope made for him a pillow, and faith a garment rare,
To wrap him in his slumbers, till Christ his home prepare.
But when the dawn of morning broke in his little room,
He rose, and cried "Hosanna! Deliverance has come!"

Then I heard the song of triumph he sung upon that shore,
Saying, "Jesus has redeemed me, to suffer never more;"
And casting his eyes backward on the race that he had run,
He shouted loud, "Hosanna! Deliverance has come!"

The chorus has been translated into German as follows:

Denn Siegespalmen
Und Ehrenkronen,
Siegespalmen sind unser Lohn.

=== Bloodwashed pilgrim variation ===
The song has also been sung with the title "The Bloodwashed Pilgrim", using different words and the same tune:

I saw a blood washed pilgrim, a sinner saved by grace,
Upon the King's highway, with peaceful, shining face;
Temptations sore beset him, but nothing could afright;
He said, "The yoke is easy, the burden, it is light."

Refrain
Then palms of victory, crowns of glory,
Palms of victory I shall wear.

His helmet was salvation, a simple faith his shield,
And righteousness his breastplate, the spirit's sword he'd wield.
All fiery darts arrested, and quenched their blazing flight;
He cried "The yoke is easy, the burden, it is light."

Refrain

I saw him in the furnace; he doubted not, nor feared,
And in the flames beside him, the Son of God appeared;
Though seven times 'twas heated, with all the tempter's might,
He cried, "The yoke is easy, the burden, it is light."

Refrain

'Mid storms, and clouds, and trials, in prison, at the stake,
He leaped for joy, rejoicing, 'twas all for Jesus' sake;
That God should count him worthy, was such supreme delight,
He cried, "The yoke is easy, the burden, is so light."

Refrain

I saw him overcoming, through all the swelling strife,
Until he crossed the threshold of God's eternal life;
The crown, the throne, the scepter, the name, the stone so white,
Were his, who found, in Jesus, the yoke and burden light.

Refrain
