= Benjamin Adams House =

Historic house in Massachusetts, United States

- U.S. National Register of Historic Places
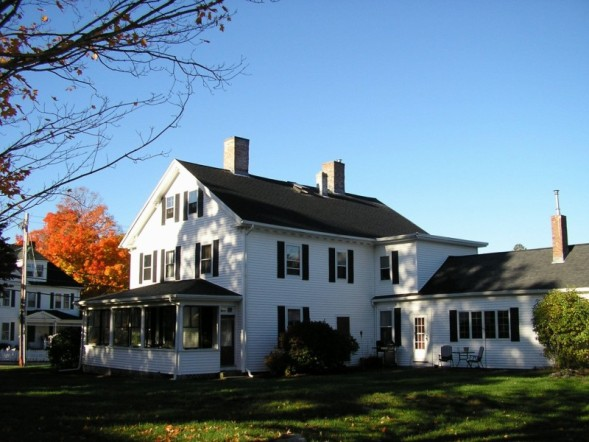
- Rear/side view of the house, fall 2007

- Location within Massachusetts Location within the United States
- Location: 85 N. Main St., Uxbridge, Massachusetts
- Coordinates: 42°4′49″N 71°38′3″W
- Area: 1.86 acres (0.75 ha)
- Built: 1792
- Architectural style: Federal
- MPS: Uxbridge MRA
- NRHP reference No.: 83004101
- Added to NRHP: October 7, 1983

The Benjamin Adams House is a historic house located at 85 North Main Street, in Uxbridge, Massachusetts. Probably built before 1792, it is a good quality example of Federal period architecture, built for a prominent local lawyer and businessman. On October 7, 1983, it was listed on the National Register of Historic Places.

== Description and history ==
The Benjamin Adams House is located north of the center of Uxbridge, on the east side of North Main Street just beyond its junction with Seagrave Street. It is a 2 1/2-story wood-frame structure, with a side-gable roof and symmetrically placed interior brick chimneys. The exterior is finished in aluminum siding, but retains its five-bay front facade. The main entrance is sheltered by a shallow hip-roof portico, supported by paired paneled square columns, which rise to an entablature and modillioned eave. The entrance is framed by sidelight windows and topped by a semi-oval fanlight window. An enclosed hip-roof porch extends across the right side. The house had an associated 19th-century barn into the late 20th century; a modern block of condominiums extends to the rear over its site.

The house was most likely built sometime before 1792; it exhibits high-quality Federal styling despite the application of modern siding. Benjamin Adams, probably its first owner, was an early 19th-century United States Congressman, lawyer, and banker. For much of the 19th century, it was owned by members of the Gunn family, including a manufacturer of men's suits and a pharmacist.

== See also ==
- National Register of Historic Places listings in Uxbridge, Massachusetts
