= Benjamin Matthias Adams =

Benjamin Matthias Adams (born Stamford, Connecticut, 1824; died Bethel, Connecticut, 27 December 1902) was a United States Methodist minister.

== Biography ==
He was the son of General Adams, and his mother was a daughter of the Rev. John B. Matthias. He was educated in a private school in which William Miner, afterward governor of Connecticut, taught. After considerable mental struggle he entered the ministry of the Methodist Episcopal Church and joined the New York Conference in 1848, in which he labored for 17 years. He was then transferred to the New York East Conference.

He was a close observer of the habits of birds and nature and lectured on “Fun in Animals”. He was a member of the general conference of 1884. He was a personal friend of the Warner sisters. A letter which he wrote to Anna Warner contained a passage which led her to compose the widely known hymn, “One more day's work for Jesus.” His ministry, spent in and around New York and Brooklyn, was noteworthy.
