= Immaculate Conception Cathedral (Brownsville, Texas) =

Historic church in Texas, United States

- Immaculate Conception Church
- U.S. National Register of Historic Places
- Recorded Texas Historic Landmark
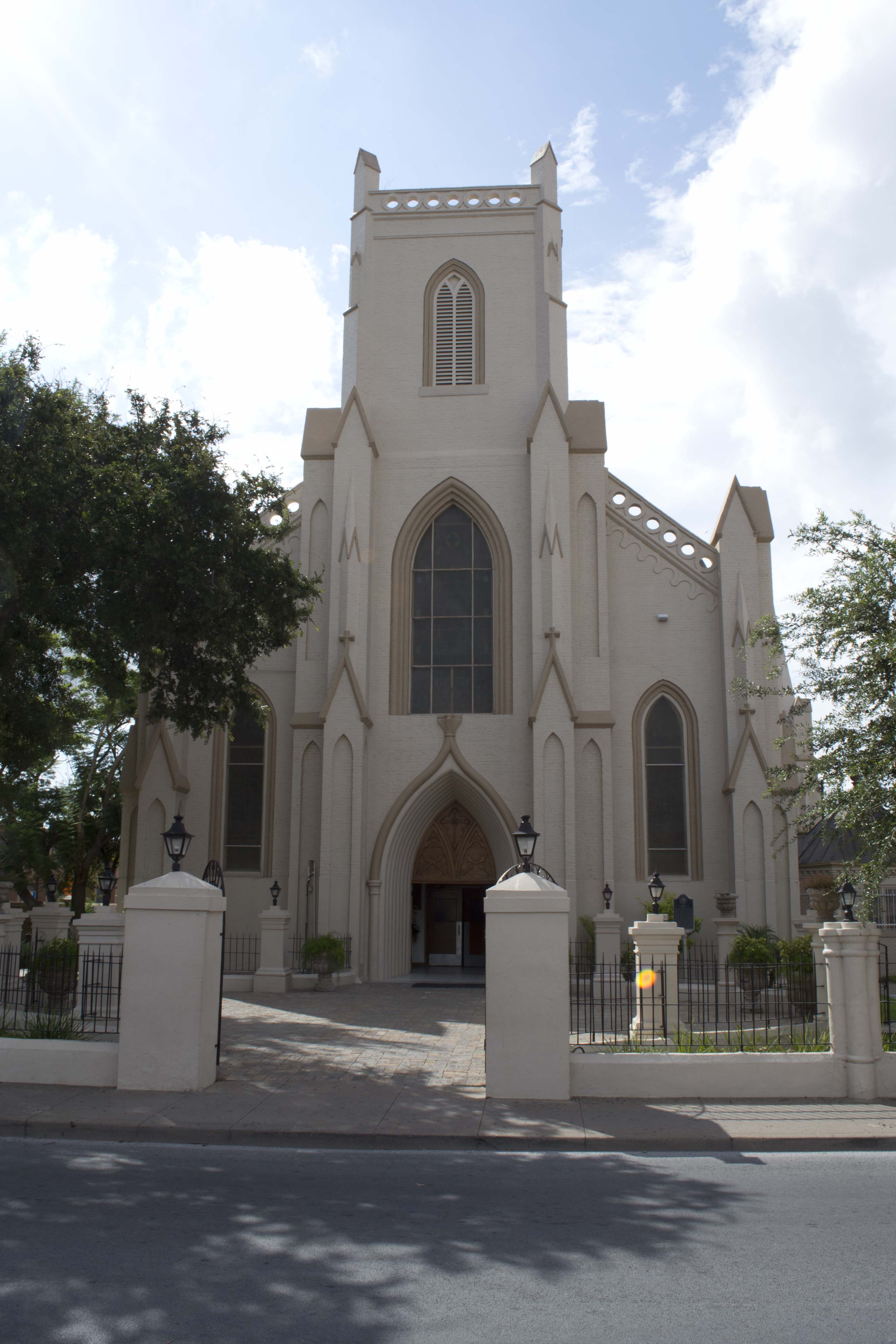
- Immaculate Conception Church in 2011

- Location within Texas Location within the United States
- Location: 1218 E. Jefferson St. Brownsville, Texas
- Coordinates: 25°54′9″N 97°29′45.5″W
- Area: less than one acre
- Built: 1856
- Architect: Father Pierre Yves Kéralum
- Architectural style: Gothic Revival
- NRHP reference No.: 80004085
- RTHL No.: 2617

Significant dates
- Added to NRHP: March 26, 1980
- Designated RTHL: 1962

Immaculate Conception Cathedral is a historic church at 1218 East Jefferson Street in Brownsville, Texas, United States. It is the cathedral church for the Roman Catholic Diocese of Brownsville. It was built in 1856 and added to the National Register of Historic Places in 1980 as Immaculate Conception Church.

== History ==
The Missionary Oblates of Mary Immaculate were the first priests to celebrate Mass in the area of Brownsville in 1849. The present Gothic Revival style building was designed by Peter Yves Keralum. The Oblates operated a seminary in the rectory, which also was a haven for priests who fled the revolutions in Mexico. The first Catholic bishop to reside at Immaculate Conception was Dominic Manucy who was the Apostolic Vicar of Brownsville. The Vicariate became the Diocese of Corpus Christi in 1912. On July 10, 1965 Pope Paul VI established the Diocese of Brownsville from Corpus Christi and Immaculate Conception became the cathedral for the new diocese.

== See also ==
- List of Catholic cathedrals in the United States
- List of cathedrals in the United States
- National Register of Historic Places listings in Cameron County, Texas
- Recorded Texas Historic Landmarks in Cameron County
