= Fisher Industries =

American construction company

Fisher Industries is a privately held construction company based in Dickinson, North Dakota, founded by Gene Fisher in 1952 and led in turn by sons David Fisher, Micheal Fisher, and Tommy Fisher. It is the parent company of Fisher Sand and Gravel, Arizona Drilling and Blasting, Southwest Asphalt, Southwest Asphalt Paving, Fisher Grading and Excavating, Fisher Ready Mix, and General Steel and Supply Co.

== Links with Donald Trump ==
President Donald Trump lobbied for the company to receive contracts on the Mexico–United States border wall, to the Department of Homeland Security, to Todd T. Semonite of the Army Corps of Engineers, and promoted the company in an interview on Fox News with Sean Hannity. Jared Kushner has also endorsed the company, as well as freshman North Dakota senator Kevin Cramer, to whose campaign the Fisher family contributed $50,000.

Tommy Fisher has appeared on local and conservative TV and radio and is a donor to several charities and the Republican Party. Senator Cramer suggested Fisher's Fox News appearances are what attracted Trump to the company. Tommy Fisher has spent $145,000 on lobbyists to discuss the border wall with lawmakers.

== Legal issues ==
The High Plains Reader has documented environmental violations and tax evasion by the company, including 169 citations and paying $1 million in air quality violation fines in Maricopa County, Arizona over the past 10 years. By May 2019, the company had racked up 1,300 air-quality violations and a $500,000 fine in 2013 for breaking an earlier air quality agreement. From 2002 to 2020, Fisher Sand & Gravel companies paid $697,000 in fines to the Environmental Protection Agency. In 2009, Micheal Fisher, then-owner of Fisher, pled guilty to nine counts of felony tax fraud, being sentenced to 37 months in prison and over $300,000 in restitution. Amiel Schaff, FSG's former chief financial officer, and Clyde Frank, FSG's former comptroller, also pled guilty to one count each of conspiracy to defraud the United States in 2009. The 2009 Department of Justice settlement required FSG to pay a total of $1.16 million in restitution, penalties and fines, implement measures to prevent future fraud at the company, and cooperate with the IRS in audits of its tax returns. Another former head of the company, David William Fisher, pled guilty in 2005 to possession of child pornography of a 10 year old child and was sentenced to 10 years in prison. Although in exchange for his guilty plea, the charges of sexual exploitation of minors was dropped. He was released on April 30, 2010.

A three-mile section of border wall constructed by Fisher Industries was found by the International Boundary and Water Commission (IBWC) to be in violation of the 1970 Boundary Treaty between the United States and Mexico, due to the wall potentially moving the centerline of the Rio Grande and thus the international border between the two countries. The IBWC in federal court asked Fisher Industries to address concerns with the Rio Grande centerline, flood damage, debris accumulation, and erosion due to the wall. The land the wall was built on was not subdivided before construction, and caused a $20 million increase in the taxable value of the farmland, increasing the tax bill by 7,500 percent. Fisher Industries had entered into a lease-purchase agreement strip of land the wall is built on, but did not complete the purchase in over a year, making it unclear who will pay the tax bill. The IBWC completed its hydrology model in March 2020 and found one point where the wall was deflecting too much water, but that the wall's impacts overall were minor. ProPublica and The Texas Tribune provided photos of the wall to engineers and hydrologists, who said the wall was starting to suffer from runoff erosion and is at risk of falling into the river unless repairs are made. The next hearing is scheduled for March 3, 2021.

== Projects ==
=== Galena Creek Bridge ===
In 2011, Fisher Sand & Gravel completed the Galena Creek Bridge in Washoe County, Nevada after work on it had been stopped by a previous contractor for being "too dangerous" due to high winds.

=== San Diego wall prototype and government contracts ===
In April 2019 Fisher Industries sued the Army Corps for using an inconsistent contract acceptance policy in two wall contracts. The Corps agreed and sided with Fisher. They had previously built a concrete-based prototype of the border wall in 2017. The concrete wall was late, over budget, and more expensive than a steel wall, and Fisher's later steel design did not meet the Army Corps requirements.

=== New Mexico private wall construction ===
The company built sections of a border wall on private property in Sunland Park, New Mexico owned by the American Eagle Brick Company. Sunland Park is adjacent to El Paso, Texas and Ciudad Juárez in the Mexican state of Chihuahua. Some of the construction money was raised by We Build the Wall, which began as a GoFundMe campaign by Internet fundraiser Brian Kolfage. Despite construction having been started, building permits for the wall had not been approved by Sunland Park whose mayor issued a cease and desist letter to Fisher. Construction resumed on May 30, 2019, after research on zoning showed the structure was within code.

=== Proposed Arizona demonstration project ===
Trump advisor and former Kansas Secretary of State, Kris Kobach, visited Coolidge, Arizona with disabled United States Air Force veteran Brian Kolfage and other border wall proponents to observe Fisher's demonstration of how it would build a border fence. Fisher maintained it could erect 218 miles of the barrier for $3.3 billion and be able to complete it in 13 months. Spin cameras positioned atop the fence would use facial recognition technology. Fiber optic cables buried in the ground could detect and differentiate between human activity, vehicles, tunneling, and animals as distant as 40 feet away. The Arizona barrier would be constructed with 42 miles near Yuma and 91 miles near Tucson, Arizona, plus 69 miles near El Paso, Texas, and 15 more miles near El Centro, California. It would reportedly cost $12.5 million per mile. Louisiana Republican U.S. Senator Bill Cassidy said he traveled with the group of politicians over the 2019 Easter recess to Coolidge, which is 120 miles north of the Mexico border, because he felt that not enough barrier and border enhancements had been erected since Donald Trump became president 27 months previously. Cramer was there to promote Fisher, which demonstrated its ability by constructing a 56-foot fence in Coolidge, located 120 miles north of the Mexican border. However, Arizona's freshman U.S. Senator, Republican Martha McSally said that a barrier will not resolve the border crisis.

=== Border infrastructure along Cabeza Prieta National Wildlife Refuge ===
On December 2, 2019, Fisher Sand and Gravel Company was awarded nearly $400 million by the U.S. Army Corps of Engineers to construct border infrastructure alongside the Cabeza Prieta National Wildlife Refuge. The estimated 31 miles of new barrier would cost $12.9 million per mile. The Department of Defense's inspector general launched an audit of the contract two weeks later.

=== Southern Arizona border wall project ===
On May 6, 2020, the US Army Corps of Engineers awarded a $1.28 billion contract to Fisher Sand and Gravel to build 42 miles of border wall near Nogales, Arizona, at a cost of $30.4 million per mile.

== Involvement with We Build the Wall organization ==
In late 2018, Kobach had joined with other right-wing political operatives, including billionaire Erik Prince, Trump adviser and former Breitbart editor Steve Bannon, Breitbart manager Brandon Darby, former Milwaukee County, Wisconsin Sheriff David Clarke, former Congressman Tom Tancredo and Kolfage to form an organization to raise funds facilitating construction of a barrier. Kolfage had raised tens of millions of donated dollars and asserted the organization would raise such private funds to construct hundreds of miles of their proposed border wall on private lands in Arizona, New Mexico, and Texas. As its prime organizer, in December 2018, Kolfage launched what he represented as an attempt to raise $1 billion via GoFundMe for the wall's construction, but changed the structure of the organization to become a 501(c)4, that allows it to make unlimited political contributions. Kolfage stated that the target figure was achievable, adding "This won't be easy, but it's our duty as citizens". In June 2019, Tommy Fisher took part in We Build the Wall's three-day "Wall-A-Thon" fundraiser, which raised $25 million by mid-2020. The organization had difficulty giving the money to the US government, and instead formed a nonprofit organization to spend the money. On August 20, 2020, a federal grand jury indictment was unsealed against Bannon, Kolfage and two others, charging them with conspiracy to commit wire fraud and money laundering. Federal prosecutors of the U.S. Attorney's Office for the Southern District of New York allege that Bannon, Kolfage, and the two other defendants used funds received from the We Build the Wall fundraising campaign, marketed to support the building of a border wall between the U.S. and Mexico, in a way which was "inconsistent" with how they were advertised for use to the public.

== See also ==
- National Emergency Concerning the Southern Border of the United States
- First presidency of Donald Trump § Ethics
