= We Build the Wall =

Private, non-profit organization seeking to build sections of a Mexico–US border wall

We Build the Wall, Inc.
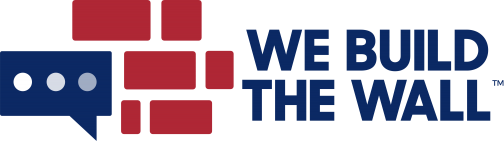
- Founded: 2019
- Founder: Brian Kolfage
- Type: 501(c)(4) Nonprofit organization
- Tax ID no.: 83-3040627
- Purpose: Fundraise and build the Trump Wall
- Headquarters: Panama City Beach, Florida
- Key people: Steve Bannon (Advisory Board Chair); Kris Kobach (Advisory Board); Erik Prince (Advisory Board); Tom Tancredo (Advisory Board)
- Website: https://webuildthewall.us (defunct)

We Build the Wall was an organization that solicited donations to build private sections of the wall along the Mexico–U.S. border. It started as a GoFundMe campaign by United States Air Force veteran Brian Kolfage in December 2018. Kolfage announced the formation of a 501(c)(4) non-profit organization in January 2019. By mid-2020, over $25 million had been raised and a 3-mile (4.8 km) section of fence had been built. The organization was involved in the construction of walls along the border in Sunland Park, New Mexico, and Mission, Texas.

Its advisory board included politicians and activists with a hard-line stance on illegal immigration, including former secretary of state of Kansas Kris Kobach; former congressman Tom Tancredo; Blackwater USA founder Erik Prince; former Milwaukee sheriff David Clarke; and former Trump chief strategist Steve Bannon, who was chairman of the board.

In August 2020, Brian Kolfage, Steve Bannon, Andrew Badolato and Timothy Shea were charged with a scheme to divert over a million dollars from We Fund the Wall, of which at least $350,000 illegally went to Kolfage for personal use. The men faced federal felony charges of conspiracy to commit wire fraud and conspiracy to commit money laundering. Kolfage and Badolato pled guilty and were sentenced. After Shea's first trial ended in a hung jury, he was convicted in October 2022 and received a 63-month sentence in July 2023. Bannon was pardoned of federal charges by then-president Donald Trump, but he was indicted in September 2022 on state charges in New York to which he pleaded guilty on February 11, 2025.

As of 2023, after the sentencing of the founders, the organization was defunct.

== Organizational history ==
=== Beginnings on GoFundMe ===
In December 2018, Kolfage started an attempt to raise $1 billion via GoFundMe, initially called We Fund the Wall, for the construction of a border wall between the United States and Mexico. Kolfage said the target figure was achievable, adding "This won't be easy, but it's our duty as citizens". In an email to The Washington Post, Kolfage stated that he began the fundraiser as "political games from both parties" have been holding back funding for the wall. Within three days, over $9 million had been raised.

=== Formation of non-profit organization ===
In January 2019, Kolfage posted a message to the GoFundMe page that he had decided that raising money through a nonprofit would be more successful. A new 501(c)(4) nonprofit was created and called We Build The Wall Inc. through which Kolfage plans to have segments of the wall privately constructed through negotiations with landowners along the border. GoFundMe however issued a statement after Kolfage's statement that it would give refunds unless the donor chose to opt into the change to where the donations would go.

By January 2019, former Kansas Secretary of State and anti-immigration activist Kris Kobach had joined Kolfage's advisory board. Kobach said he was currently unpaid, but might take a paid position with Kolfage's organization. Kobach indicated the biggest problems along the border were "litter and security." In a phone call between him and the president on January 23, 2019, Kobach said Donald Trump, endorsed the project saying, "...the project has my blessing, and you can tell the media that." As the money Kolfage is accumulating is going to a 501(c)4, it could all be spent as "dark money" in political campaigns, with next to no public reporting of expenditures required.

=== Kobach campaigns for Wall and Senate ===
On July 8, 2019, as he stood in front of a "Build the Wall" banner, in Leavenworth, Kansas, Kobach announced his candidacy for the 2020 United States Senate election in Kansas to replace retiring Senator Pat Roberts, saying, referring to his campaign theme: "I've been on the southern border constantly in the past six months and I can tell you stories that will make your skin crawl." "I don't talk about what the president and I say in our communications, but let me just say he was very encouraging when we spoke a few days ago." A spokesperson confirmed Kobach had spoken to President Trump about the announcement of his candidacy on July 4. Kobach received the endorsement of former congressman Tom Tancredo, who is known for his political views on illegal immigration and is also a board member for We Build The Wall. However, despite his best efforts, Kobach lost the Republican Primary to Representative Roger Marshall.

On August 1, 2019, Kobach sent out a campaign fundraiser using both the corporate name and email list of "Wall" donors. Kobach's involvement with WBtW, which is a 501(c)4 organization, has given cause for concern, as the fundraising and campaign mailing lists it is accumulating are prohibited from coordinating with his Senate campaign, but the ability and appetite for effective oversight within the Trump administration are anticipated to likely be inadequate. Common Cause Vice President of Policy and Litigation Paul S. Ryan said, "At a minimum, this Kobach for Senate fundraising solicitation email appears to violate the 'paid for by' disclaimer requirement" for official campaign communications. Ryan specified the requirement that mandates disclosure of the financial sponsors who originate official political communications. Kobach's email might be legal if his campaign paid fair market value for use of the list. If that were the case, a "paid for by" disclaimer would be required but was not present in the solicitation. Ryan said, "If the Kobach committee did not pay fair market value for the cost of disseminating this email, then the committee has arguably committed the more serious campaign finance law violation of receiving a corporate contribution in the form of a coordinated expenditure." WBtW is legally prohibited from financing federal political campaigns in any fashion.

On July 23, 2019, Kansas Senate President Susan Wagle of Wichita filed the paperwork with the Federal Election Commission necessary to run in the race for the vacant Senate seat. She criticized Kobach's employment in the controversial privately financed and constructed scheme to build the southern border wall. Wagle supports the building of a federally designed, bid and funded wall while saying Kobach's group undermines federal involvement. "We don't need some rogue organization going out and building the wall."

=== Donation concerns ===
Concern has been raised about how the money from the GoFundMe would be distributed after the fundraiser has ended. While on the fundraiser Kolfage has stated that he has contacted the Trump administration about donating the money, and citizens can mail money as gifts to the United States, according to the U.S. Treasury Department. He has also cited the 2012 Washington Monument restoration project in which a philanthropist billionaire matched donations to restore the monument after the 2011 East Coast earthquake. It is not clear if the Department of Homeland Security can accept gifts, and if the money is accepted it would still go into a general fund that must be allocated by Congress.

Other concerns about the use of donations were raised in 2019 by backers and others who became concerned about the reported clandestine operations and assurances of progress without physical backing of land being purchased or structures being built. Kolfage has repeatedly changed the date for the beginning of the project under WeBuildTheWall Inc, having told Politico in February 2019 that groundbreaking would be in May or June 2019, then in a March 2019 interview with American Family Radio he claimed the date to be April 2019.

=== Florida criminal investigation ===
In June 2019, Florida's Department of Agriculture and Consumer Services, which oversees Florida charities soliciting funds from the public, initiated investigations into several complaints, including allegations of questionable use of collected funds, the organization only having one director (Kolfage) on its board of directors instead of the mandatory minimum of three required for a nonprofit organization, and filing false statements about the board. Kolfage responded that the investigation was politically motivated by Florida Commissioner of Agriculture and Consumer Services Nikki Fried.

=== Criminal indictments ===
In August 2020, the Acting U.S. Attorney for the Southern District in New York announced indictments of Kolfage and Bannon for conspiracy to commit wire fraud and money laundering. Kolfage allegedly took more than $350,000 for his personal use and Bannon over $1 million to cover personal expenses and pay Kolfage, while concealing their use of donor funds by “creating sham invoices and accounts to launder donations and cover up their crimes”. Financier Andrew Badolato and Timothy Shea were also charged. All four initially pleaded not guilty, and a trial was first set for May 24, 2021. In April 2022, Kolfage and Badolato entered pleas of guilty including conspiracy to commit wire fraud. Kolfage was sentenced to 4 years 3 months in prison, Badolato to 3 years in prison. Shea was convicted in October 2022 of two conspiracy counts and an obstruction of justice charge. In July 2023, Shea was sentenced to 63 months imprisonment, the longest sentence of the four defendants for his role in the wire fraud scheme, as well as being ordered to forfeit $1,801,707 and pay restitution of the same amount.

Bannon alone was pardoned by outgoing president Donald Trump at the end of his presidency. Then-Manhattan District Attorney Cyrus Vance Jr. continued to pursue Bannon under state law. Shortly after the pardon, Vance subpoenaed Wells Fargo for records related to Bannon's role in We Build the Wall. Bannon pleaded guilty on February 11, 2025. As part his plea, Bannon received a sentence of three-year conditional discharge. He will not spend time in prison, nor will he need to pay restitution because his co-defendants in the federal case already paid restitution.

== Sunland Park wall ==
The organization began construction on Project 1 using donated funds over Memorial Day 2019. In an unannounced operation, the organization constructed between 1/2 and 1-mile of bollard fencing using "weathered steel" on a section of the border in Sunland Park, New Mexico, on the property of American Eagle Brick Company, near El Paso, Texas.

The 18-foot (5.5 m) high fencing was intended to close a gap between a 21-mile (34 km) section of existing fencing along the Rio Grande and mountainous terrain. Kris Kobach of We Build the Wall claimed the area was allowing up to 100 illegal immigrants and $100,000 in illegal drugs to enter the US each night. Jeff Allen, owner of the property upon which the wall was constructed, stated, "They are doing an incredible job. I have fought illegals on this property for six years. I love my country, and this is a step in protecting my country." The fence constructed on Allen's land reportedly cost $6–8 million of the donated funds. The section begins on the Rio Grande river and extends over 2,500 feet (760 m) to the lower elevations of Mount Cristo Rey in New Mexico. Construction was done by Tommy Fisher's Fisher Sand & Gravel, a company that President Trump has suggested should be contracted by the United States Army Corps of Engineers, or the US government for federally funded border wall construction. Allen had previously worked with United Constitutional Patriots, allowing them to conduct operations from his land, despite having a hostile attitude towards on his land. The United Constitutional Patriots helped with site visits by We Build the Wall (WBtW) and supplied video that was used in their funding campaign.

Kobach stated that WBtW has plans to construct further barriers on private lands adjoining the border in Texas and California. Now the General Counsel for the organization, he said, "We do have agility, and speed and determination, and that's what I hope you see on display when you look at this wall."

Construction was delayed for two days after the mayor issued a "cease and desist" order, but resumed on May 30, 2019, after research on zoning showed the structure was within code. In May, after completing a demonstration half-mile wall on private property in Sunland Park, New Mexico, WBtW was accused by local officials of failing to first obtain required work permits. He wrote on Twitter his group had "planned for battle" rushing the project during a holiday weekend "when the corrupt city was partying." That tweet was later deleted. Kolfage also tweeted "So Sunland Park officials support open borders, the sex slaves and illegal drugs coming into their communities?" Both Sunland Park and WBtW said they were laboring to get the project into compliance. A month later, local officials said the necessary permits had yet to be obtained; the city had filed a complaint against landowner on which the wall was constructed. In June 2019, the International Boundary and Water Commission (IBWC) determined that We Build the Wall had built its wall across federally owned land and had built and locked a gate across a road leading to Monument One without required permits. The IBWC also accused WBtW of installing a gate for the wall on federal land in lieu of proper permits or authorizations, while illegally preventing access to waterways and a public monument.

According to emails obtained via Open Records Act requests, WBtW was informed about such permits and studies that were required to build the gate on federal property but ignored them and proceeded with construction anyway. "We are literally making a mountain out of a molehill," said attorney Rich Kaye, who represented WBtW, in writing to the IBWC on June 3. The next day, Kolfage tweeted video of the gate being constructed. IBWC officials said the gate needed to be kept open during daytime work hours. They also said that the half-mile structure hadn't prevented people from illegal border crossings, but rather channeled them to cross at a nearby dam which created a "safety and security problem." Kolfage responded with accusations, in lieu of any evidence, that both Sunland Park and IBWC officials were corrupt and conspiring with Mexican drug cartels. WBtW and the IBWC eventually resolved their dispute. As a result, the gate is kept open during the day and closed and locked at night, which, according to Kolfage, is fine, because "all the traffic comes through that area at night."

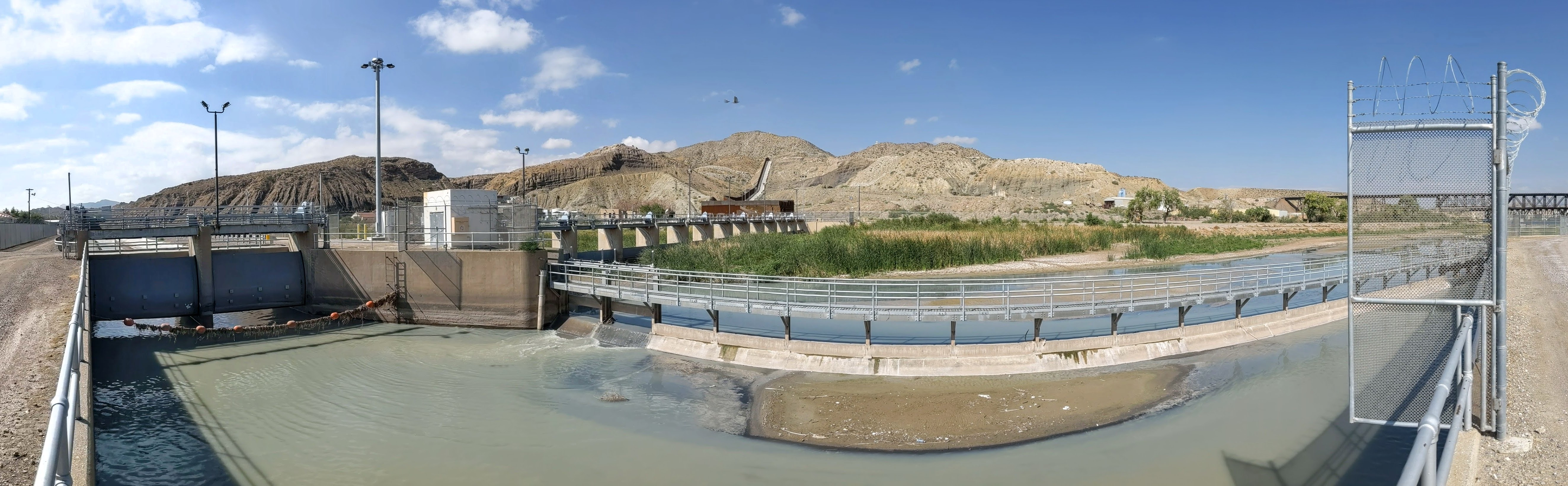
Panoramic view of the American Dam and Canal, with mountains of Mexico (left) and New Mexico (right). We Build the Wall's private border wall is seen on Mount Cristo Rey in the center background.

== Mission/Rio Grande wall ==
On October 13, 2019, marked the beginning of Project 2 along the Rio Grande in Mission, Texas. The website indicated that projects 2 and 3 were at 67% of their fundraising goals and could include up to 35 additional miles (56 km). This is significantly more mileage than Project 1. Fisher called it the "Lamborghini" of walls, versus the government's "horse and buggy" design.

=== Temporary halt ===
On December 3, 2019, Hidalgo County district judge Randy Crane ordered the group to temporarily halt all construction due to its plans to build in the floodplain the Rio Grande, which a lawyer for the National Butterfly Center argued would create a flooding risk. According to Kolfage, "We have many people who try to stop us legally with silly attempts, and in the end we always prevail. I would put a 50/50 chance [that the court order] is fake news, and if it's not it will be crushed legally pretty fast". Kolfage also tweeted the butterfly center had "rampant sex trade".

The order was ignored and work did not stop.

IBWC noted to Judge Crane that WBtW didn't supply the hydraulic models necessary for construction along the banks of the river, only providing a six-page analysis. Even during the court order, Fisher Industries continued to perform preparatory excavation.

On January 9, 2020, a federal judge lifted an injunction, allowing a construction firm to move forward with the 3 miles (4.8 km) project in the floodplain of the Rio Grande River. The lawsuit continued, however, as IBWC ran hydraulic modeling.

On February 17, 2020, We Build the Wall announced that Project 2 had been completed. The Texas Tribune and ProPublica also noted that in February IBWC Commissioner Jayne Harkins donated $500 to Trump and a Republican PAC.

=== Erosion ===
In March 2020, IBWC released their 24-page hydraulic analysis, noting the treaty was violated for hydraulic changes but that overall the problems were relatively minor.

In July, Assistant U.S. Attorney Eric Paxton Warner told Judge Crane that four areas of erosion needed to be fixed. The attorney for the Butterfly Center said the erosion is "massive", and "You can see the erosion actually made a hole under the wall." The consensus among hydrologists and engineers ProPublica talked to said the Rio Grande has scoured against the base of the wall, causing erosion and putting the wall in danger of falling down. Mark Courtois, a Fisher attorney, called it "a normal part of new construction projects like this" and denied it was serious. Kolfage stated it was "designed for floods", but engineers and hydrologists raised concerns, noting that the IBWC model was incorrect. The Fisher wall is also much shallower than federal walls, 2.5 feet (0.76 m) versus 6 feet (1.8 m) or more. The construction also removed vegetation from slopes, increasing erosion risk. The parties agreed to a detailed inspection of the wall on July 8.

In response to the ProPublica report and erosion problems, Trump tweeted that "I disagreed with doing this very small (tiny) section of wall", going on to say "It was only done to make me look bad, and perhsps [sic] it now doesn't even work. Should have been built like rest of Wall, 500 plus miles."

=== Tax liability ===
The 638 acres (2.58 km^{2}) of land the wall was built on is part of farmland that belongs to Neuhaus and Sons, and the wall added over $20 million in taxable land improvement, increasing the tax burden by 75 times. In January 2020, Fisher Industries started a lease-purchase agreement with Neuhaus and Sons for the land under the wall, but had not completed the ownership transfer by their court hearing on December 12, 2020, citing a problematic land survey by Fisher. Fisher's attorney, Mark Courtois, was hopeful the US government would become owners of both the wall and land. U.S. Customs and Border Protection (CBP) Public Affairs Officer Thomas Gresback said that the wall was privately paid for and on private property, and CBP does not have anything to do with the project. CBP is constructing its RGV-03 project wall outside the floodplain 0.3 miles (0.48 km) away. As of July 2021, the property had been reassessed at 100 times its original value, and Fisher was hoping to sell a 3-mile section of wall (4.8 km) that had cost $30 million to build.

== See also ==
- Citizens of the American Republic
- Executive Order 13767
