= Citizens of the American Republic =

Defunct American political organization

- Founded: 21 November 2017
- Defunct: 31 March 2021
- Type: 501(c)(4)
- Tax ID no.: 82-3509136(EIN)
- Headquarters: Los Angeles, California, United States
- Key people: Steven K. Bannon, president
- Revenue: $4,453,313 (2018 FY)
- Website: Official website

Citizens of the American Republic (COAR) was an American 501(c)(4) non-profit organization founded by Steve Bannon in 2017.

The organization attracted attention following the federal grand jury indictment of Bannon, Brian Kolfage, and several of their associates on charges of conspiracy to commit fraud and conspiracy to commit money laundering in connection with the We Build the Wall fundraising project.

== Finances ==
Citizens of the American Republic is a dark money organization. Bannon has declined to describe or identify the group's donors.

The group reported no contributions in the 2017 tax year. According to its tax filings, the group raised approximately $4.45 million in 2018, of which a single donor contributed $2 million, and most of the rest was part of "six- and seven-figure donations" from a small number of donors. In 2018, the group reported making a $200,000 loan and a $50,000 payments to Bannon's film company, Bannon Film Industries Inc. The group also reported $40,000 in payments to Sean Bannon (Steve Bannon's nephew) and $20,000 in payments to Mary E. Meredith (Steve Bannon's sister), who was listed as the group's vice president. The group reported making only $15,000 in grants that year, of which $10,000 went to volunteer fire department where Bannon hosted a political rally. The group reported spending $1.1 million on "other expenses" (vendors) and more than $1.4 million on "conferences, conventions and meetings."

== History and operations ==
Bannon founded Citizens of the American Republic in 2017, after he was abandoned by his previous financial backers, Robert Mercer and Rebekah Mercer. The New York Times reported in January 2018 that, according to Bannon's associates, Bannon aimed to raise between $25 million and $100 million "to build an antiestablishment political operation" that would spend money on Republican primary election campaigns, with half going to voter mobilization initiatives and half going to political advertising. Bannon reportedly "spent months quietly courting some of the deepest pockets on the right" to raise money for the effort.

The group is a platform for Bannon to promote President Donald Trump's views via podcasts and films. According to the organization it was formed to "advance the ideals of American nationalism and American sovereignty." The organization's website features videos and other content promoting "economic nationalism" and advocating against illegal immigration.

In 2018, the group focused on an attempt to keep Republican control of the House of Representatives in the 2018 election. During that year, Bannon's associate Guo Wengui (also known as Miles Kwok), exiled Chinese billionaire businessman, allowed Bannon to use one of his two private jets to travel to events in support of Republican congressional candidates in New Mexico and Arizona. The flights were revealed in February 2020 by ProPublica. Bannon made the flights under the auspices of Citizens of the American Republic. Several campaign finance experts who spoke with ProPublica said the trips could violate federal campaign finance law, which prohibits foreign nationals from making contributions to candidates in U.S. political campaigns (including in-kind contributions such as payment for campaign-related travel). Guo and Bannon denied that the travel was for campaign activity; an attorney for Bannon's group stated that the trips on the private jet were to promote Bannon's film, Trump@War.

In 2019, Bannon hired Cleta Mitchell, a high-profile conservative attorney who has also represented the National Rifle Association of America (NRA), to represent the organization.

The organization attracted attention following the federal grand jury indictment of Bannon, Brian Kolfage, and several of their associates on charges of conspiracy to commit fraud and conspiracy to commit money laundering in connection with the We Build the Wall fundraising project. The indictment alleges that Bannon used "Non-Profit-1" (a group matching the description of Citizens of the American Republic) to divert funds from the wall group. According to the indictment, federal prosecutors plan to seek forfeiture of the assets of the organization, as well as from other Trump-aligned political organizations.

== See also ==
- Breitbart News
- Government Accountability Institute
