= David Clarke (sheriff) =

American sheriff (born 1956)

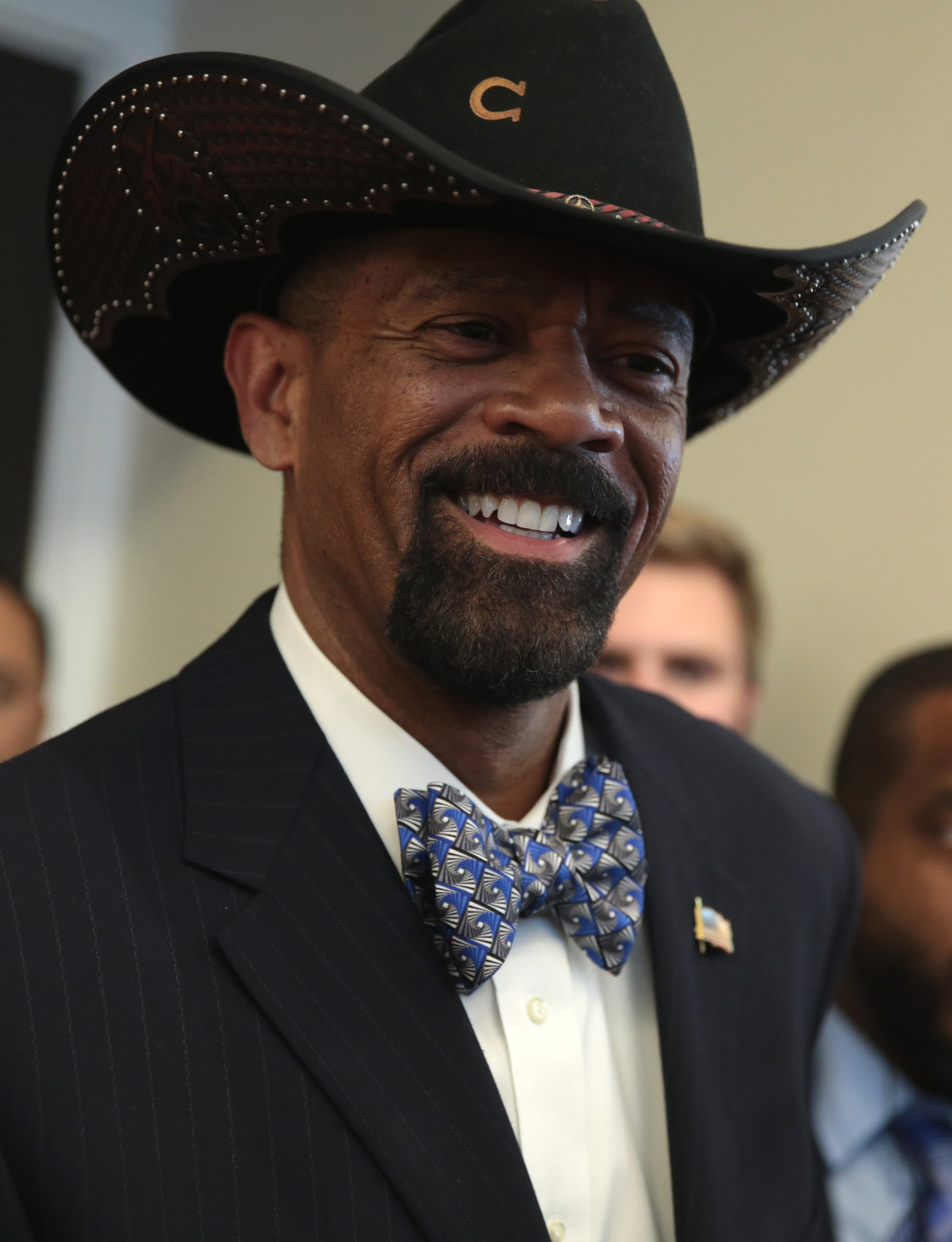
- Clarke in 2017

64th Sheriff of Milwaukee County
- In office March 19, 2002 – August 31, 2017
- Appointed by: Scott McCallum
- Preceded by: Leverett F. Baldwin
- Succeeded by: Richard Schmidt (acting); Earnell R. Lucas (elected)

Personal details
- Born: David Alexander Clarke Jr. August 21, 1956 (age 70) Milwaukee, Wisconsin, U.S.
- Party: Democratic (Note: Clarke served as the Sheriff of Milwaukee from 2002 to 2017 as a Democrat.)
- Other political affiliations: Republican (Note: Clarke had refused to join the Democratic Party of Wisconsin and aligned himself with Republicans.)
- Spouse: Julie Clarke (m. 1996; div. 2018)
- Education: Concordia University Wisconsin (BA); Naval Postgraduate School (MA)

David Alexander Clarke Jr. (born August 21, 1956) is an American former law enforcement official who served as Sheriff of Milwaukee County, Wisconsin, from 2002 to 2017.

In 2002, Clarke was appointed to the position by Republican governor Scott McCallum and later elected that same year to his first four-year term. He was reelected in November 2006, 2010 and 2014. Although Clarke declared himself as a Democrat after his appointment as sheriff and ran as a Democrat in a heavily Democratic county, many of Clarke's political views align with those of conservative Republicans; he refused to join the Wisconsin Democratic Party, instead promoting conservative views, and allying himself with Republican officials.

As sheriff, Clarke frequently clashed with other Milwaukee County officials over the budget and other matters, and came under scrutiny for deaths and alleged mistreatment of jail inmates. One man died of thirst in what a coroner ruled was a homicide, and pregnant women were handcuffed and shackled while undergoing labor. Clarke frequently appeared as a guest on Fox News through February 2018 and was a speaker at the 2016 Republican National Convention. He resigned as sheriff in August 2017. A vocal supporter of President Donald Trump, Clarke garnered attention for controversial and sometimes inflammatory social-media posts, and was considered for a role in the Trump administration. After resigning as sheriff, Clarke joined the pro-Trump super PAC America First Action as a spokesman and senior advisor; he left the group in 2019.

== Early life, education, and early career ==
Clarke was born in Milwaukee, one of five children of Jeri and David Clarke Sr. His father was a paratrooper with the 2nd Ranger Infantry Company. His uncle was NFL player Frank Clarke, whom he idolized.

Clarke Jr. attended Marquette University High School where he played for the varsity basketball team. After finishing high school, Clarke took classes at the University of Wisconsin in Milwaukee but dropped out during his first year when he got a job driving beer trucks.

His career in law enforcement began in 1978 at the Milwaukee Police Department (MPD). He "rose through the ranks at a slow but steady pace in his 24 years with the department". Clarke was a patrol officer for eleven years and then a homicide detective; he was promoted to lieutenant of detectives in 1993 and captain in 1999.

Clarke's career was not without controversy; in 1994, the mother of a 15-year-old boy filed a complaint alleging that Clarke used excessive force when arresting her son. According to public documents, Clarke was returning from a vacation when he spotted five teenagers heaving rocks at passing cars. Clarke chased down the teens, drew his service revolver and ordered them to lie on the ground. He admitted to using his foot to turn one boy over as he searched for weapons. The boy's mother claimed Clarke put a gun to her son's head and kicked him in the side, causing bruised ribs that required medical attention. However, the Fire and Police Commission ruled there was insufficient evidence to charge Clarke and dismissed the case.

In 1999, Clarke received a B.A. in Management of Criminal Justice from Concordia University Wisconsin's School of Adult and Continuing Education. In January 2002, Milwaukee County Sheriff Leverett F. Baldwin resigned midway through his term to take a pension payout. Clarke was one of ten applicants for the position, and Governor Scott McCallum appointed him on March 19, 2002. He was elected to a full term later in 2002, and was reelected in 2006, 2010, and 2014.

=== Master's thesis plagiarism ===
In 2013, Clarke received a master's degree in security studies from the Naval Postgraduate School (NPS). In May 2017, CNN reported that Clarke had plagiarized portions of the thesis he completed as part of the requirements for this degree, stating that in the thesis, "Clarke failed to properly attribute his sources at least 47 times." The thesis ("Making U.S. security and privacy rights compatible") was found to have lifted material verbatim from several sources without proper citation, including reports by the American Civil Liberties Union, the 9/11 Commission Report, and George W. Bush's memoir Decision Points. Clarke provided footnotes to sources that he used, but did not properly place quotations around verbatim words of his sources, which is an act of plagiarism according to the NPS. Following the report, the NPS removed the thesis from its online archive. In response to the report, Clarke called journalist Andrew Kaczynski, who broke the story, a "sleaze bag" and denied that he had plagiarized.

In a July 2017 letter to Clarke, NPS dean of students, Commander Paul Rasmussen, wrote that he concurred with the Honor Code Board that Clarke's thesis was "in violation" of the school's honor code but that the "violation was not a result of any intentional deception or misappropriation efforts". Rasmussen instructed Clarke to submit a revised thesis within 100 days or NPS would "initiate degree revocation". Clarke received several extensions on the original deadline before submitting his revised thesis in March 2018; NPS officials informed Clarke that his edits were satisfactory, and allowed him to retain his degree.

== Political views ==
Clarke has "built a following among conservatives with his provocative social media presence and strong support of Donald Trump". His prominence as a right-wing firebrand has made him a controversial and polarizing figure.

=== Planned Parenthood ===
He has criticized Planned Parenthood, suggesting instead that it be renamed "Planned Genocide".

=== Comments on race ===
In 2015, Clarke received criticism for his statement on his podcast: "Let me tell you why blacks sell drugs and involve themselves in criminal behavior instead of a more socially acceptable lifestyle: because they're uneducated, they're lazy and they're morally bankrupt. That's why."

In 2017, Clarke attracted attention and criticism for trading racial insults with Marc Lamont Hill, an African-American CNN commentator; on Twitter, Clarke used a racial slur ("jigaboo") to insult Hill.

==== Black Lives Matter ====
Clarke is a frequent and vociferous critic of the Black Lives Matter (BLM) movement, referring to it as "Black Lies Matter" and describing the movement as a hate group. Clarke denies that police officers are more willing to shoot black suspects than white suspects, has labeled BLM activists "subhuman creeps", and has called for the targeted eradication of the movement "from American society". He has also claimed that Black Lives Matter would eventually join forces with ISIS in order to destroy American society. He has urged the Southern Poverty Law Center to include BLM among the hate groups it monitors. Clarke has blamed "liberal policies" for rioting and other issues in American cities. Clarke's stance on the movement has been criticized by the Milwaukee chapter of the NAACP and other activists.

Clarke has harshly criticized various black critics of police abuses. He has called former attorney general Eric Holder an "a[ss]hole" and accused him in testimony before the Senate Judiciary Committee of "outright hostility" toward police, referred to Al Sharpton as a "charlatan" and criticized Beyoncé for her reference to the Black Panthers in her halftime-show performance at the 2016 Super Bowl.

=== Gun control ===
In January 2013, Clarke was featured on a series of public radio ads that said citizens could no longer rely on the police for timely protection and should arm themselves. Later that month, Clarke appeared on the CNN program Piers Morgan Live, with Milwaukee Mayor Tom Barrett, who "said it was irresponsible of Clarke to 'basically imply' that it won't help citizens to call 911 when they need help".

In 2015, Clarke traveled to Moscow on a $40,000 trip, with all expenses paid by the National Rifle Association of America, Pete Brownell (an NRA board member and CEO of a gun-parts supply company) and "The Right to Bear Arms", a Russian pro-firearms organization, founded by Maria Butina, a Russian national, who pleaded guilty in 2018 to being an unregistered Russian agent. During the meeting, Clarke met the Russian foreign minister and attended a conference at which Russian official Aleksander Torshin, a close ally of Vladimir Putin, spoke.

In 2018, Clarke attracted attention for using Twitter to promote a conspiracy theory about the Stoneman Douglas High School shooting in Parkland, Florida; Clarke tweeted that "The well ORGANIZED effort by Florida school students demanding gun control has GEORGE SOROS' FINGERPRINTS all over it", suggesting that the students from Parkland were being manipulated by Soros to organize for gun control.

=== Suspension of habeas corpus in the United States ===
Clarke has called for the suspension of habeas corpus in the United States in a December 2015 appearance on his radio program, where he asserted that there were "hundreds of thousands" or "maybe a million" people who "have pledged allegiance or are supporting ISIS, giving aid and comfort", and stated that "our commander in chief ought to utilize Article I, Section 9" to imprison them at the Guantanamo Bay detention camp "and hold them indefinitely under a suspension of habeas corpus".

=== Ideology and relationships with Republican and Democratic parties ===
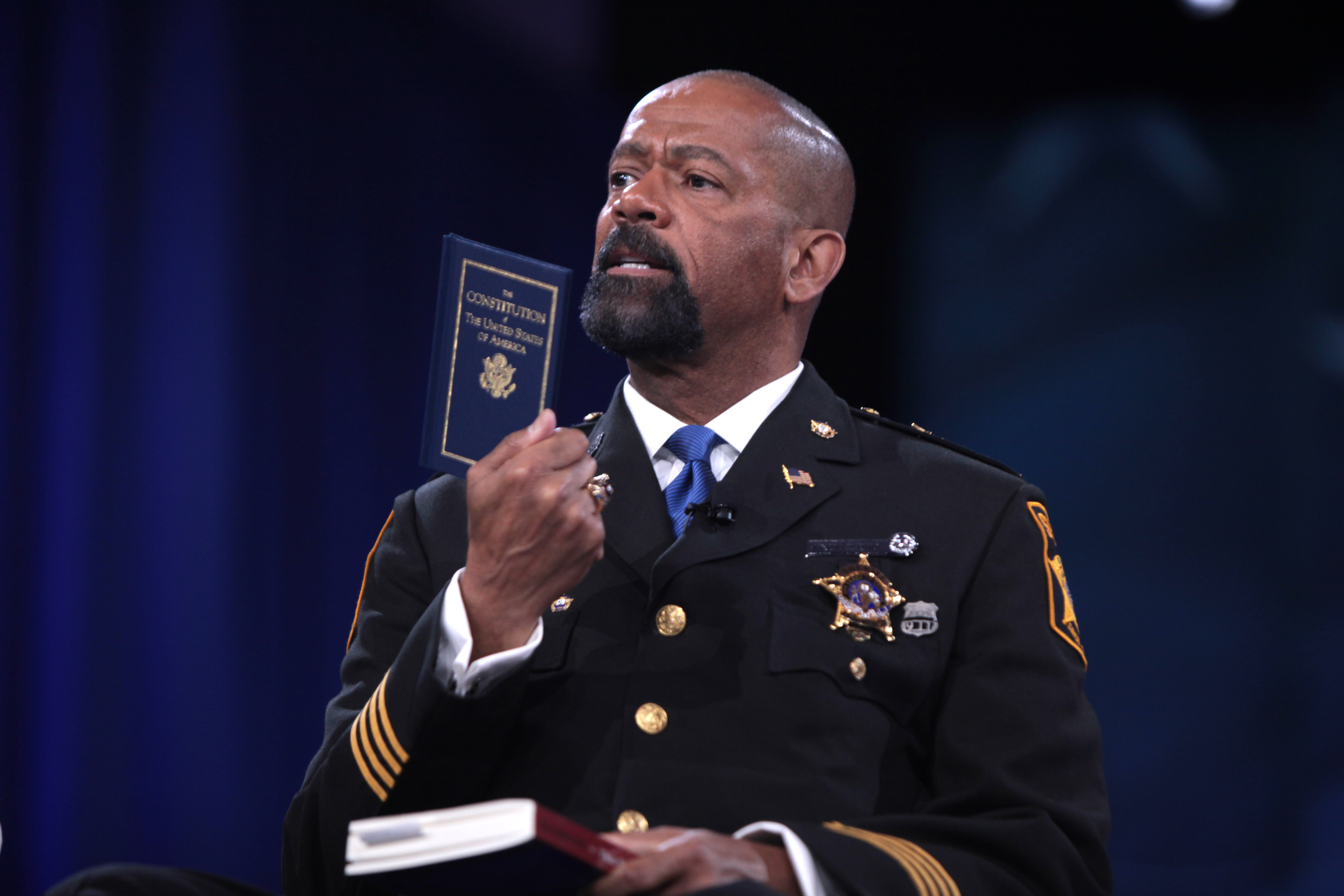
Clarke holding up a copy of the United States Constitution

After his appointment to the sheriff's post by McCallum, Clarke declared himself as Democrat, but refused to join the Wisconsin Democratic Party, instead promoting conservative views, and allying himself with Republican officials. Clarke ran for sheriff as a Democrat, which is advantageous in heavily Democratic Milwaukee County. However, Clarke is almost universally regarded as a staunch right-wing conservative. Clarke frequently criticizes Milwaukee Mayor Tom Barrett and other Democrats; often speaks at Republican events, and is allies with the National Rifle Association, which has raised funds for his re-election campaigns. Clarke has in turn been criticized by the local Democratic Party. On his website in 2014, Clarke stated that he questioned "why the Office of Sheriff is a partisan election" and wrote: "I have never asked a person to vote for me because I run as a Democrat. I ask them to vote for me based on my 35-year commitment to keeping citizens safe. Most voters get it when it comes to public safety. There is no Democrat or Republican way to be a sheriff. The enemy is not the opposing party; the enemy is the criminal."

In 2016, Maurice Chammah of The Marshall Project characterized Clarke as an "iconoclastic sheriff", one of "a long line of controversy-courting lawmen" that includes Richard Mack and Joe Arpaio in Arizona. Clarke attracted attention for "dalliances with the far right" over time including his acceptance in 2013 of the "Sheriff of the Year Award" from the Constitutional Sheriffs and Peace Officers Association, a group of sheriffs founded by Mack that has been criticized by the Southern Poverty Law Center for espousing radical-right views. Earlier the same year, Clarke appeared for an interview on the syndicated show of Alex Jones.

== Sheriff of Milwaukee ==
=== Budget and clashes with the Government of Milwaukee County ===
Clarke has often clashed with the county government over the sheriff's office budget, engaging "in a long-running, high-profile tiff" over the issue with Milwaukee County Executive Chris Abele, "with Clarke providing the more incendiary rhetoric". Abele's proposed budget for 2014 would cut $12 million from the Sheriff's Office budget, eliminating 69 jobs and "shifting park patrols, emergency management, 911 communications and training divisions" to other entities, such as the Milwaukee Police Department, suburban police departments, and the county Department of Emergency Preparedness. Abele described the budget as a way to refocus the sheriff's office on "core, mandated services". Clarke issued a statement calling Abele a "vindictive little man" and saying that "Abele should be drug-tested. He has to be on heroin or hallucinating with that statement." Abele responded by saying that it was "unfortunate the sheriff, instead of engaging in thoughtful civil discourse, is making personal attacks and making light of a serious problem in our community and state".

On another occasion, Clarke said that Abele had "penis envy".

In 2015, Clarke clashed with Abele again after Clarke filed a lawsuit against the county over the sheriff's budget, seeking $25 million in funds to hire 75 deputies, 43 House of Corrections officers and 17 supervisors. Clarke argued that his office is underfunded by the county, while Abele noted that the sheriff's office had received the largest increase of any county department and criticized Clarke for having what he termed "a very heavy command staff", "a lot of unnecessary overtime", and redundancies in courthouse security. Clarke sued Abele, alleging that he had violated Clarke's right to free speech through the budget process; a federal judge dismissed Clarke's suit in April 2016.

A county audit released in 2012 showed that the Milwaukee County Sheriff's Office used asset forfeiture funds to buy exercise equipment for Clarke's command staff, for a Disney training, and for a mounted patrol unit. The audit reported that the spending violated county procurement rules, although not federal rules on the use of seized money. Clarke was criticized for the amount of money spent on the mounted patrol by County Supervisor Patricia Jursik; Clarke defended the office's use of the funds.

According to an Associated Press tally, from 2012 to April 2016, Clarke had incurred more than $310,000 in legal fees for his private attorney, who represented him in litigation against Milwaukee County. Milwaukee County taxpayers paid the legal fees. The county spent an additional $83,000 defending itself against Clarke's lawsuits.

In 2012, the Milwaukee County Sheriff's office under Clarke spent $75,000 on an order of 565 new Glock handguns with "glow-in-the-dark" sights, "enough to outfit each of the department's 275 deputies with two of the popular guns and still have some left over". The order was criticized as excessive by critics, including county Supervisor John Weishan Jr. (who said there "was absolutely no reason to justify" the purchase) and the Milwaukee County Deputy Sheriffs Association president (who said that he would have preferred the sheriff's department to use funds to re-hire laid-off deputies rather than to replace weapons). Clarke declined to comment, but a department official defended the purchase.

=== Potential mayoral run ===
In January 2014, Clarke announced he was considering a run for mayor of Milwaukee in 2016, but ultimately decided not to run, instead endorsing Republican Alderman Bob Donovan's unsuccessful bid to unseat Mayor Tom Barrett.

=== House of Correction and detainee abuse controversies ===
In January 2008, a National Institute of Corrections audit of the Milwaukee County House of Correction in Franklin identified 44 areas of concern, calling the House of Correction "dysfunctional" and determining that it suffered from "serious security, staff morale and management flaws". The House of Corrections was at the time a separate Milwaukee County department overseen by a superintendent who reported to then Milwaukee County Executive Scott Walker. Walker and the County Board transferred control over the House to the Sheriff's Department under Clarke on January 1, 2009.

Clarke was repeatedly accused of abusing detainees at the county jail. Following the deaths of four inmates at the jail in six months, the United States Department of Justice launched an investigation of the jail. Milwaukee County chief medical examiner Brian Peterson accused Clarke of verbally harassing and threatening him in an October 2016 telephone conversation after Peterson's office made the mysterious deaths of two inmates at the jail earlier that year public. According to the Milwaukee Journal Sentinel, Clarke also attracted attention for temper-related incidents: "He once berated a 911 dispatcher for not being professional, threatened to arrest the new House of Correction chief and called a sergeant a 'terrorist' and 'cancer' in a two-hour, expletive-filled rant".

==== Death of Terrill Thomas ====
The Milwaukee County Jail turned the water off to inmate Terrill Thomas's cell, resulting in his death by dehydration on April 24, 2016. According to inmates, the water was turned off for six days and the staff refused to provide water to Thomas. On September 15, 2016, the Milwaukee medical examiner ruled Thomas's death a homicide. Later that day Clarke's office sent out a press release which stated it would be "withholding employee internal investigations and will not be commenting on this matter until the completion of all investigative and review processes, and any resultant civil litigation". Clarke did not comment publicly on his agency's handling of Thomas's incarceration, but has highlighted Thomas's poor physical health and criminal history.

In May 2017, after hearing six days of testimony at an inquest, a Milwaukee County jury found probable cause that seven jail employees (two supervisors, five officers) had committed a crime—specifically, abuse of a resident of a penal facility—and recommended that charges be brought. In February 2018, three Milwaukee jail officers were charged with a felony in connection with Thomas's death. Clarke was not charged. District Attorney John T. Chisholm said "he believed his office had charged the people who were most culpable."

In May 2019, Milwaukee County and the health care company Armor Correctional Health Services Inc. settled the lawsuit for $6.75 million, which is one of the largest settlements related to the death of an inmate in an American prison.

==== Death of newborn and shackling of pregnant women ====
Clarke's department came under fire for its use of restraints on pregnant women inmates. This controversial practice has been abolished or restricted by at least ten states and has been prohibited by the Wisconsin Department of Corrections as well as by the Federal Bureau of Prisons.

In 2014, a woman who was handcuffed and shackled for 21 hours while in labor sued the county. In 2017, a second lawsuit was filed by another woman who was shackled while giving birth, and while hospitalized for prenatal care and postpartum treatment. The suit contends that the jail has a blanket policy of shackling all hospitalized inmates, "regardless of their criminal or medical history", and that at least 40 women were shackled in this manner.

In June 2017, a federal jury awarded $6.7 million in a lawsuit by a woman who accused a Milwaukee County Jail guard of raping her on at least five occasions when she was 19 years old and pregnant. Criminal charges of sexual assault had been dropped against the guard after he pled no contest to lesser charges in 2014.

In July 2016, a pregnant inmate at the jail with serious mental illness went into labor and the newborn baby died. The mother filed a federal lawsuit against the Milwaukee County Sheriff's Office, stating that she was denied medical attention before her pregnancy, had medical appointments canceled, received prenatal vitamins only once, and was "laughed at" by guards after going into labor. This death and others at the jail prompted calls for Clarke's resignation from a county supervisor and several Democratic state legislators.

=== Proselytism lawsuit ===
In 2006, Clarke invited members of an Evangelical Christian organization, the Fellowship of Christian Centurions, to speak at several mandatory employee meetings, at which the group members proselytized. Several deputies complained about the Centurions' proselytizing, but Clarke refused to stop the presentations. The sheriff deputies' union and two individual sheriff's deputies (a Catholic and a Muslim) successfully sued Clarke in the United States District Court for the Eastern District of Wisconsin. Clarke appealed to the U.S. Court of Appeals for the Seventh Circuit, which upheld the lower court's ruling in 2009. The sheriff did not seek review in the U.S. Supreme Court.

=== Airport harassment and abuse-of-power investigation and lawsuit ===
In February 2017, a Detroit-area man, Dan Black, filed a harassment lawsuit against Clarke after Milwaukee deputies detained the man at the Milwaukee airport in January. The man had asked Clarke about his football team preference and shook his head at Clarke. On the tarmac, Clarke sent text messages to one of his captains, Mark Witek, directing sheriffs' deputies to detain Black. Clarke wrote: "Question for him is why he said anything to me. Why didn't he just keep his mouth shut? Follow him to baggage and out the door. You can escort me to carousel after I point him out." After arriving at the airport, Black was "met by a group of six uniformed deputies and two dogs, all of whom were accompanied by the sheriff" who questioned him before releasing him. Airport surveillance video showed Black telling deputies: "He [Clarke] thinks because I asked who he is, he can exert that kind of power over me." Local media reported that "at least one of the deputies who was ordered to confront Black didn't believe he had been disruptive".

After Black filed a complaint with the Milwaukee County Sheriff's Office, Clarke responded by taunting and threatening Black via Facebook. Black's counsel states that Clarke engaged in a "gross and arbitrary abuse of power" and ordered an unlawful stop and detention. An ensuing civil lawsuit by Black resulted in 2018 in a verdict in Clarke's favor; the jury found that Clarke's Facebook posts did not chill Black's exercise of his First Amendment rights.

The incident drew national attention, prompting federal investigations to examine Clarke's conduct. In a May 2017 letter, the U.S. Attorney's Office declined to prosecute Clarke for federal civil-rights offenses, writing: "Our decision is not meant to affirm the wisdom or propriety of what occurred. It reflects only our belief that it would be difficult or impossible to prove a violation of the only federal statute available to us ... beyond a reasonable doubt."

Milwaukee County auditors launched an investigation into whether Clarke abused taxpayer resources during the airport incident. Clarke refused to cooperate with the investigation, and blocked auditors from interviewing Milwaukee County sheriff's deputies. Clarke's refusal to cooperate in the investigation prompted the Milwaukee County Board to authorize legal action against Clarke on the issue. An affidavit filed by the FBI in March 2017 (and made public in December 2017) indicated that "investigators for the Audit Services Division of the Milwaukee County controller's office determined as part of its own investigation that Clarke had 'used his official position as sheriff of Milwaukee County in excess of his lawful authority to direct his deputies to stop and question Black without legal justification.'"

=== Approval ratings ===
In a January 2017 poll conducted by Public Policy Polling, which surveyed Milwaukee County voters, 31% approved of the job Clarke was doing, compared to 62% who disapproved. In the same poll, 65% said they believed Clarke had a negative impact on the image of Milwaukee County, and among registered Democrats, 13% said they would vote for Clarke in a hypothetical Democratic primary, compared to 82% who would prefer another candidate.

=== Donald Trump support and possible role in Trump administration ===
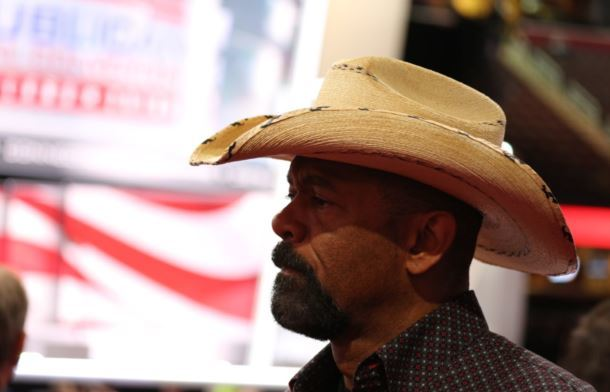
Clarke at the 2016 Republican National Convention

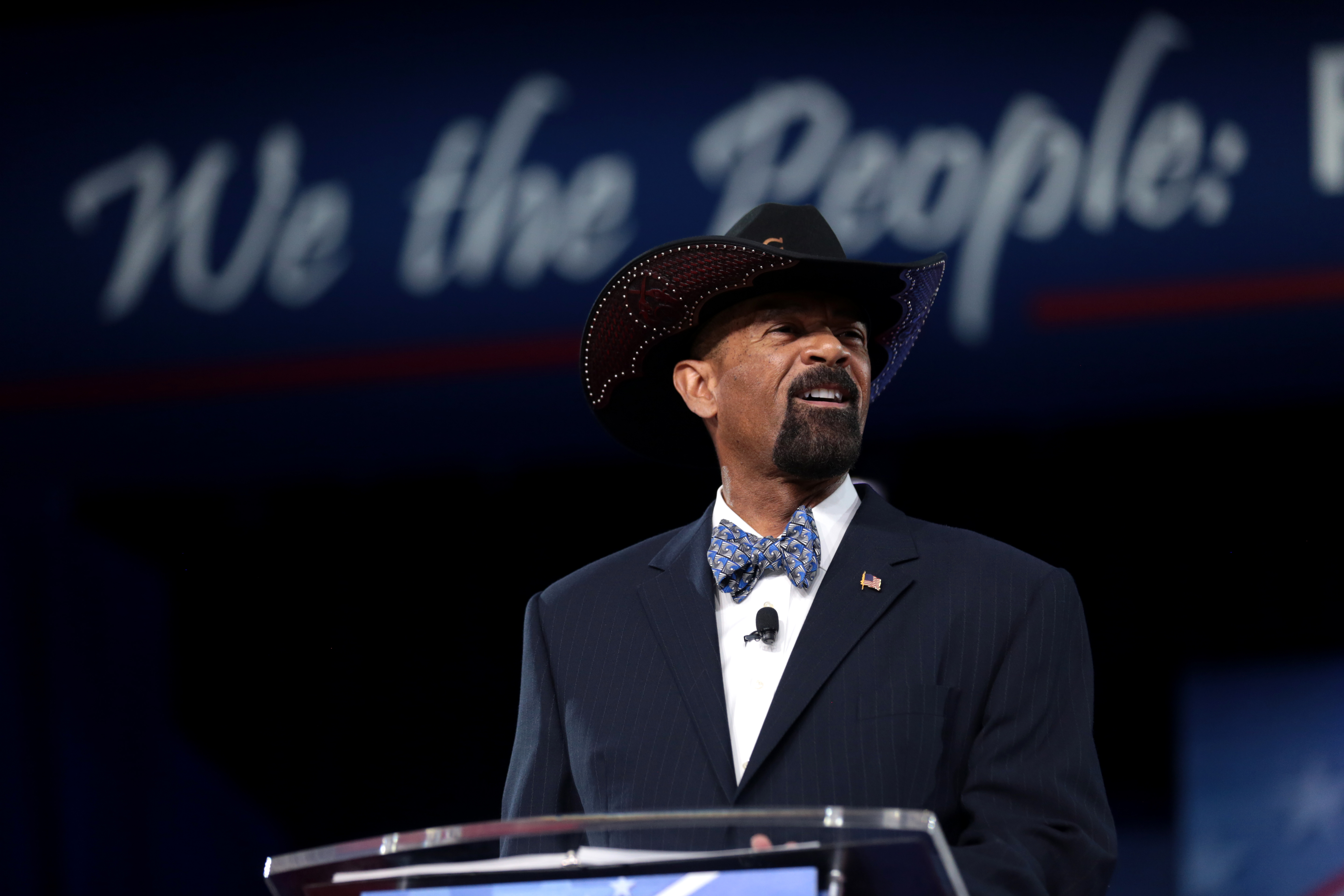
Clarke at the 2017 Conservative Political Action Conference

Clarke is a strong supporter of Republican Donald Trump, saying during Trump's 2016 presidential campaign that he would "do everything I can" to help Trump win the presidency. Clarke spoke at the 2016 Republican National Convention in Cleveland, Ohio. In October 2016, Clarke tweeted, "It's incredible that our institutions of gov, WH, Congress, DOJ, and big media are corrupt & all we do is bitch. Pitchforks and torches time." with an attached photo of an angry mob holding pitchforks and torches. Clarke met with Trump, when Trump was president-elect, about a possible position in his administration.

In May 2017, Clarke said in a radio interview that he would take the post of Assistant Secretary of Homeland Security for Partnership and Engagement in the Trump administration. The White House declined to comment, and the Department of Homeland Security stated that no appointment had been officially made. The position does not require Senate confirmation.

The DHS did not say whether the appointment was actually offered to Clarke. Following a CNN report on plagiarism in his master's thesis, Clarke said that he was unsure if the Trump administration would hire him.

The prospective appointment of Clarke was criticized by Milwaukee County Executive Chris Abele; former Homeland Security official Juliette Kayyem; and California Senator Kamala Harris, who sits on the Senate Homeland Security Committee. Harris wrote that "Clarke's unconscionable record makes him unfit to serve" and that the "appointment is a disgrace". On June 17, Clarke rescinded his acceptance of the post. John F. Kelly, who had been the Secretary of Homeland Security at the time, told Clarke that he would not be given a position at the DHS in part due to scandal surrounding the treatment of inmates in Clarke's jail and the ensuing negative media attention.

=== Conservative media commentary and absences from Milwaukee County ===
Clarke "has become a fixture of conservative media" and in 2015 began hosting a podcast talk show, David Clarke: The People's Sheriff, on Glenn Beck's TheBlaze Radio Network, where he has expressed support for the occupation of the Malheur National Wildlife Refuge. Clarke also frequently appeared as a guest on Fox News, and on one occasion in September 2015 guest-hosted The Sean Hannity Show. However, in March 2019, The Daily Beast reported that Clarke had essentially been banned from Fox News and that he had not appeared on Fox News since February 2018. He also appeared on CNN, Fox News, and other major news outlets to discuss ongoing police controversies.

Clarke's higher profile coincided with an increase in his speaking fees and time spent outside Milwaukee County on outside activities. In 2015 financial disclosure documents, Clarke reported receiving $150,000 in speaking fees, travel reimbursements, gifts and other items; in 2016, he received $220,000 worth of such items. Also in 2016, Clarke spent about 60 days traveling or attending events, 59 of them outside Wisconsin. Clarke's absences from the county, as well as redactions in his official schedule as provided to journalists who made public-records requests, led to "increasing scrutiny over his job performance" from local media outlets and criticism from the Wisconsin Freedom of Information Council. Milwaukee County Executive Chris Abele has repeatedly criticized Clarke's absences from the county.

=== Resignation as sheriff ===
On August 31, 2017, Clarke resigned his position. Following his abrupt resignation, he received pension payments of more than $100,000 a year from Milwaukee County and the City of Milwaukee.

== Career post-resignation ==
A few days after his resignation as sheriff, it was announced that Clarke had joined pro-Donald Trump super PAC America First Action as a spokesman and senior advisor, where his role was to make regular appearances in the media, particularly on Fox News. The same year, Clarke published a book titled Cop Under Fire: Moving Beyond Hashtags of Race, Crime and Politics for a Better America, which Trump promoted on Twitter. America First Action paid Clarke's consulting firm, DAC Enterprises, almost $92,000 from September 2017 through July 2018, when the firm (a Maryland-based LLC) was dissolved. By that point, Clarke had reportedly been banned from Fox News (his last appearance on a Fox channel occurring in February 2018); Clarke repeatedly criticized Fox and praised the right-wing One America News Network. The cause of Clarke's break with Fox News was unclear, although Clarke's inflammatory Twitter posts and attacks on the high-school students victimized in the Stoneman Douglas High School shooting in Parkland, Florida may have played a role. In January 2018, Twitter temporarily suspended Clarke's account after he posted three messages appearing to encourage violence against the media, including a tweet reading "Punch them in the nose & MAKE THEM TASTE THEIR OWN BLOOD." Clarke was unblocked by Twitter after deleting the posts.

By early 2019, Clarke had also left his position with the Trump's America First Action super PAC; a Clarke staffer said that he had joined Brian Kolfage's and Steve Bannon's "We Build the Wall" group instead. Clarke was one of eight members of the group's advisory board, which consisted of prominent right-wing, pro-Trump figures. Clarke participated in fundraiser for the group and was listed on its website as "sheriff" (although he had in fact resigned from that office). Bannon, a former Trump chief strategist, along with Kolfage and others, promoted the group's fundraising efforts, claiming to have a plan to construct a U.S.–Mexico border wall. The fundraising effort was later revealed to be a scam, Kolfage and two other co-founders were convicted of fraud, while Bannon was pardoned by Trump before trial. Clarke was not charged or named in the indictment.

After leaving Fox, Clarke continued his career as a right-wing commentator, making regular TV appearances. In 2018, Clarke was featured on Sacha Baron Cohen's spoof comedy series Who Is America?, being interviewed by Baron Cohen's alter-ego, far-right YouTuber OMGWhizzBoyOMG. Interviewed by Baron Cohen's persona, Clarke said that if he was a sheriff in 1930s Germany, he would not want to "take sides" between fascists and antifascists.

In March 2020, Twitter deleted three of Clarke's posts for promoting disinformation about the COVID-19 pandemic. One of his tweets proclaimed that COVID-19 was "just the damn flu" while another called measures to prevent the spread of the virus "an orchestrated attempt to destroy capitalism". Clarke responded by labeling Twitter administrators "totalitarian bigots" and saying that he would join Parler instead. Also in March 2020, a day after a mass shooting at the Mayfair Mall in Wisconsin (in which eight people were injured), Clarke held a "MAGA rally" outside the mall.

In 2020, after Trump was defeated in his bid for re-election, Clarke embraced Trump's false claims of election fraud. Days after Trump was defeated, Clarke headlined a Trump rally in Milwaukee, in which he called for the Proud Boys, a violent far-right group, to establish a chapter in Wisconsin. In a speech at a QAnon conference in Las Vegas in March 2021, Clarke critiqued the January 6 attack (in which a pro-Trump mob invaded the Capitol and disrupted the counting of the electoral votes in a failed attempt to keep Trump in power); Clarke said that the attack was a "frat party" and that a future insurrection must be "serious", "well-planned", and "disciplined".

In 2021, Clarke launched a conservative advocacy nonprofit, Rise Up. in 2023, Clarke started a podcast, billing himself as "America's sheriff". The same year, he publicly mulled a potential run for U.S. Senate in 2024 for the seat currently held by Democrat Tammy Baldwin.

== Persona ==
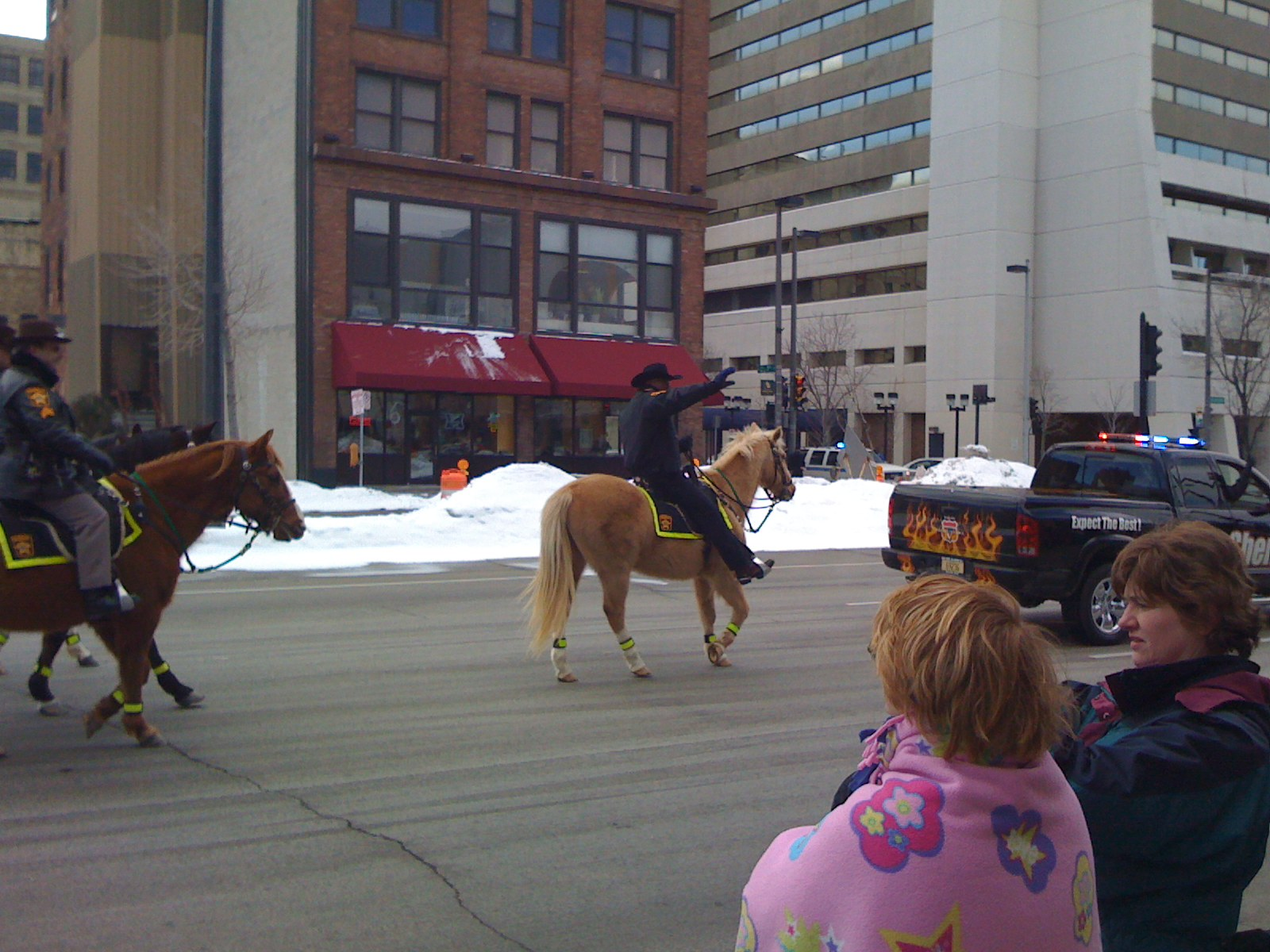
Clarke on horseback at the 2008 Milwaukee St. Patrick's Day parade

Clarke frequently appears at public events on horseback wearing a cowboy hat. While sheriff, Clarke often wore 20 or more pins and badges on his uniform when in public, many with no official meaning or purpose; this habit led to accusations of stolen valor.

== Personal life ==
Clarke married his wife Julie in 1996; she was a court clerk and later a real estate agent. They lived on the northwest side of Milwaukee. In 2018, Clarke filed for divorce from his wife. Clarke has no children.

In 2003, a profile in Milwaukee Magazine described Clarke as a "deeply religious" Catholic.

== Notes ==
Legal offices
| Preceded by Leverett F. Baldwin | Sheriff of Milwaukee County; March 19, 2002 – August 31, 2017 | Succeeded by Richard Schmidt (acting); Earnell R. Lucas (elected) |
