= Kolfage =

Kolfage may refer to:

- Brian Kolfage (born 1982), veteran of the United States Air Force
- Kolfage Island, an Ontarian island in Lake Huron
