= Larry Hopkins =

Larry Hopkins may refer to:

- Larry Hopkins (ice hockey) (born 1954), Canadian professional ice hockey player
- Larry J. Hopkins (1933-2021), American politician who served in the Kentucky House of Representatives
- Larry Mitchell Hopkins (born 1950) leader of the United Constitutional Patriots militia group in New Mexico
