= Puerto de Anapra =

Neighborhood in Ciudad Juárez, Chihuahua, Mexico

Coordinates: 31.784167°N 106.563327°W

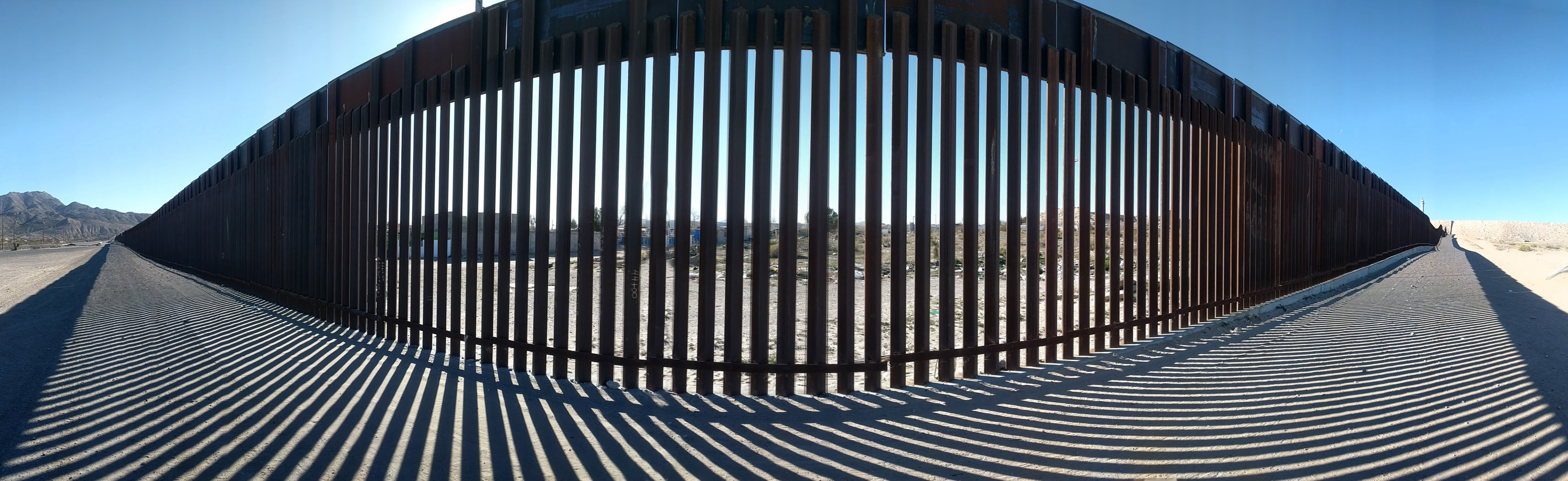
This 2017 Mexico–United States barrier upgrade at Anapra was planned by the Obama administration. Panoramic view from US side looking toward Anapra.

Puerto de Anapra, (or Colonia Puerto De Anapra or simply Anapra) is a colonia in the city of Ciudad Juárez in the Mexican state of Chihuahua. Anapra is west of the Rio Grande, on the border of the U.S. state of New Mexico. It is one of the poorest communities within the city.

The unincorporated town of Anapra, New Mexico, across the border in the United States, was incorporated as part of Sunland Park, New Mexico.
