= 2020 Mayfair Mall shooting =

Mass shooting in Wisconsin, U.S.

Coordinates: 43°4′50″N 088°2′41″W

Mayfair Mall shooting
- Wauwatosa, Wisconsin, the location of the shooting
- Location: Wauwatosa, Wisconsin, United States
- Date: November 20, 2020; 5 years ago 2:50 PM (CST)
- Attack type: Mass shooting
- Weapon: Glock 9mm handgun
- Deaths: 0
- Injuries: 8
- Perpetrator: Xavier Sevilla

On November 20, 2020, a shooting occurred at Mayfair Mall in Wauwatosa, Wisconsin, United States. Eight people were injured but survived. The shooter fled the scene afterwards and was later arrested during a traffic stop. Police said the shooting was not a random act and had been sparked by an earlier altercation between two groups. Two days later, several people were arrested in connection with the shooting, including a 15-year-old boy.

== Background ==
On February 2, 2020, a fatal shooting had occurred at Mayfair Mall. In that shooting, Alvin Cole, a 17-year-old African-American male, was killed in an incident with police officers. Cole fired a bullet from a gun before being fatally shot five times by black police officer Joseph Mensah. Mensah was suspended and eventually resigned after an independent investigation found that he was involved in two other fatal shootings, among other issues, and revealed that the bullet Cole fired hit his own arm before he was fatally shot by the officer. His resignation is effective as of November 30, 2020. Despite this, no charges were filed against the officer, sparking protests.

== Shooting ==
At around 2:50 p.m. CST on November 20, 2020, an unidentified suspect fired between eight and fifteen shots near the entrance to the Macy's in the mall. Officers believe the shooting was in relation to a fight near the area prior to the shooting, and they do not believe that the shooting was a random act. Eyewitnesses said they heard several shots but did not realize that it was a gun being fired until they saw victims fall to the floor. Many people fled the mall and went into the parking lots, where they used cars as cover to hide from the gunfire. Others sheltered in place or dropped to the floor to avoid the gunfire.

By the time the first officers arrived at the scene, the suspect had already fled. More than 100 officers from local and federal agencies ultimately responded at the mall, including agents from the FBI. A reunification site was created away from the mall for all those that got separated during the shooting.

== Victims ==
Seven adults and one teenager were injured in the shooting, but all of them survived. Four of the victims were involved in the altercation that sparked the shooting, while the other four were described by police as innocent bystanders.

== Perpetrator ==
In a press conference, the Wauwatosa police chief said that, according to eyewitness accounts, the suspect was likely "a white male in his 20s or 30s".

A later report from police clarified the suspect was a 15-year-old Hispanic male named Xavier Sevilla who allegedly committed the shooting due to a previous altercation with a group at the mall. Sevilla was arrested during a traffic stop in Milwaukee, during which the believed weapon he used was also recovered in the car. Two more arrests in connection with the shooting were announced; a person believed to have been involved and the passenger of the car at the traffic stop. The suspect's name is being withheld as authorities have identified him as a 15-year-old male. On January 6, 2023, Sevilla pleaded guilty to five counts of first-degree reckless injury with the use of a dangerous weapon and on March 30, he was sentenced to 15 years in prison and five years of extended supervision.

== Reactions ==
Wisconsin Governor Tony Evers said of the shooting: "We are thinking about all the customers and workers affected by this act of violence and are grateful for the first responders who helped get people to safety. As we learn more, we offer our support for the entire Wauwatosa community as they grapple with this tragedy."

The Milwaukee Office of Violence Prevention issued a statement after the shooting commending the quick response of first responders to the shooting, stating; "We commend the quick actions of mall staff and first responders in assisting families to safety and the life-saving efforts of the trauma unit at Froedtert Hospital. The Trauma Response Team is a partnership between the City of Milwaukee Office of Violence Prevention and Milwaukee County’s Child Mobile Crisis team to support children and youth exposed to violent or traumatic incidents in our community."

Macy's released a statement that it was working with police officers in the investigation of the shooting, and that they were saddened by the incident and the safety of their employees and customers was their top priority.

== See also ==
- Crime in Wisconsin
- Killing of Alvin Cole – 2020 police shooting of a black teenager outside Mayfair Mall
