= United Constitutional Patriots =

American right-wing vigilante group

United Constitutional Patriots is a right-wing unofficial militia group based in Flora Vista in northern New Mexico, according to the Southern Poverty Law Center (SPLC), operating primarily in the southern part of the state detaining alleged illegal immigrants. It came to national attention in the United States by April 2019. The governor of New Mexico, Michelle Lujan Grisham, released a statement indicating the vigilantes have no legal right to detain people entering the US. The head of UCP is Larry Mitchell Hopkins who uses the pseudonym Johnny Horton, Jr.

== The group and its actions ==
Jim Benvie, a spokesman for the group, said in April 2019 they were present in New Mexico "to support the Border Patrol and show the public the reality of the border." The group intends to remain in the area until the Mexico–United States border wall has been built, or Congress passes stronger immigration laws to make seeking asylum more difficult. The UCP does not consider itself to be a militia, but has a number of militia-like characteristics.

It runs an online radio show on which its members offer support for the QAnon conspiracy theory. The SPLC has documented other rumours and conspiracy theories the group espouses, such as the migrant caravans being an invading army, a means of Muslim militants gaining entry into the US or that the caravans are funded by George Soros. UCP has a rivalry with other armed groups on the border. Horton has said his group is armed for their own self-defense.

In mid-April 2019, a video was released online of the group detaining 200 migrants at gunpoint on the US-Mexico border near Sunland Park, New Mexico. This was not the first video the group posted online concerning its activities; it was part of a series extending over several months. The group's patrols, which began the previous February, hold migrants until law enforcement arrives. The group has had an encampment in the area since November 2018, and claims to have detained 3,000 migrants in all. The American Civil Liberties Union (ACLU) believes the UCP is a product of the "vile racism" of the Trump administration that "has emboldened white nationalists and fascists to flagrantly violate the law."

The group's claim that it is performing "citizen's arrests" has been dismissed by Peter Simonson, the executive director of ACLU in New Mexico, because they are allowable only for a felony. Illegal entry to the country, according to Simonson, is legally classed only as a misdemeanor. Hector Balderas, the attorney general of New Mexico, has said: "These individuals should not attempt to exercise authority reserved for law enforcement." Its PayPal and GoFundMe accounts, used for donations, were cut around this time because those online outlets have a policy of not allowing their financial services to be used by organizations which promote hate or violence.

The people living at the campsite, on or accessing land owned by the Union Pacific Railroad, were removed by the authorities on April 23. Benvie indicated that the group would not end its detention of migrants following Hopkins arrest two days earlier.

== Larry Mitchell Hopkins ==
Hopkins has multiple criminal convictions. In Klamath County, Oregon, in 2006, Hopkins was found guilty of felony firearms offences. He pleaded no contest to the charge of impersonating a police officer. He was sentenced to 60 days' imprisonment and three years' probation, but disappeared after his release from prison. At the time of his arrest, he claimed to be working directly under President George W. Bush. His uniform, similar to a police officer's, had a "Special Agent" emblem on it, but the precise nature of his claimed investigations were never consistent. An earlier felony involving Hopkins occurred in Michigan in 1996.

The FBI visited his New Mexico home in 2017 after they received reports his group was training in the state's northwest to assassinate Hillary Clinton, President Obama and George Soros "because of these individuals support" of the Antifa movement, he is said to have claimed. These details were later stated in an affidavit from an FBI special agent, but Hopkins lawyer Kelly O’Connell said her client had indicated these details were untrue. The FBI agents saw about ten firearms which Hopkins said belonged to his common-law wife Fay Sanders Murphy. They seized at least nine firearms for use as evidence, including a 12-gauge shotgun. At this time, Hopkins’ home was the base for about 20 members of UCP. The FBI has not said why it did not bring charges against Hopkins in 2017.

On April 20, 2019, Hopkins was arrested by the FBI in Sunland Park on the grounds that, as a felon, he was in illegal possession of firearms. "This is a dangerous felon who should not have weapons around children and families," Attorney General Balderas said in a statement.

Hopkins appeared in Federal District Court on April 22 charged with being a felon in possession of firearms and ammunition. He was indicted by a grand jury on these charges on April, the office of the U.S Attorney General said on April 26. Preliminary and detention hearing were scheduled for April 29 in Albuquerque, New Mexico, but a bomb threat resulted in the court having to be cleared moments before the hearing. Hopkins pled guilty to "being a felon in possession of a firearm" on January 2, 2020. Then aged 70, he was sentenced to 21 months in prison.

== Jim Benvie ==
The group's spokesman, Jim Benvie (born James Christopher Benvie), split from the UCP in May 2019 and formed his own militia group, the Guardian Patriots; the UCP lost about half its members. Benvie was arrested in Oklahoma and indicted in New Mexico the following month accused of impersonating a border patrol official the previous April. A video created by Benvie was used as evidence. Benvie, identified as being 45 at the time, was convicted and jailed for 21 months (plus a year of monitored parole) in October 2020.
