= Sunland Park, New Mexico =

- City
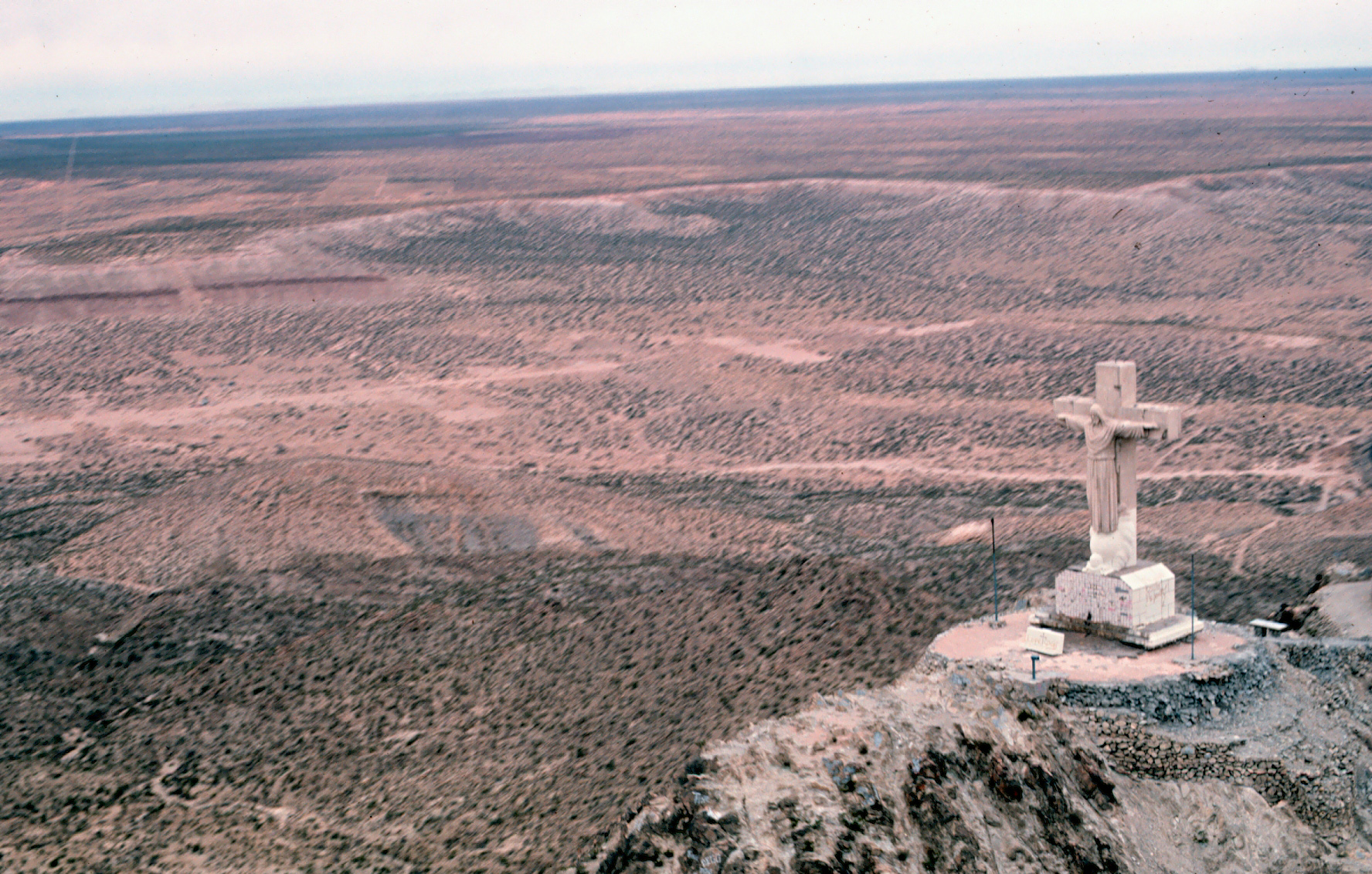
- Statue of Christ the King (by Urbici Soler) on Mount Cristo Rey in Sunland Park

- Seal

- Location of Sunland Park, New Mexico

- Location in the United States Location in New Mexico
- Coordinates: 31°51′30″N 106°38′26″W
- Country: United States
- State: New Mexico
- County: Dona Ana

Government
  - Type: Council-Manager
  - Mayor: Javier Perea
  - City Manager: Mario Juarez Infante

Area
  - Total: 15.01 sq mi (38.88 km^{2})
  - Land: 14.74 sq mi (38.17 km^{2})
  - Water: 0.27 sq mi (0.71 km^{2})
- Elevation: 3,740 ft (1,140 m)

Population (2020)
  - Total: 16,702
  - Density: 1,133.2/sq mi (437.55/km^{2})
- Time zone: UTC−7 (Mountain (MST))
  - Summer (DST): UTC−6 (MDT)
- ZIP codes: 88063, 88008
- Area code: 575
- FIPS code: 35-75640
- GNIS feature ID: 2412006
- Website: sunlandpark-nm.gov

Sunland Park is a city in southeastern Doña Ana County, New Mexico, United States, on the borders of Texas and the Mexican state of Chihuahua, with Ciudad Juárez adjoining it on the south and El Paso, Texas, on the east. The community of Santa Teresa adjoins it on the northwest. As of the 2020 census, Sunland Park had a population of 16,702. It was estimated at 17,978 by the United States Census Bureau in 2019. Though it lies adjacent to El Paso, being in Doña Ana County makes it a part of the Las Cruces metropolitan statistical area. Las Cruces is 42 miles (68 km) to the north.

The city is at the foot of Mount Cristo Rey, next to the Rio Grande, and is named for Sunland Park Racetrack & Casino, which lies within the city limits. The location was formerly called "Anapra", a name shared by an adjacent area of Ciudad Juárez.

== History ==
Sunland Park was formed when the unincorporated communities of Anapra, Sunland Park, and Meadow Vista voted to incorporate as Sunland Park on July 13, 1983.

=== 2012 extortion scandal ===
In February 2012, then-Mayor Pro Tem Daniel Salinas and City Manager Jaime Aguilera were arrested and charged with extortion of mayoral candidate Gerardo Hernandez. Salinas and Aguilera allegedly tried to blackmail Hernandez into withdrawing from the race with a videotape of Hernandez receiving a lap dance in his campaign office.

An election for mayor was held in March 2012, with Daniel Salinas winning the mayor's office, but he was denied taking office due to extortion, bribery, and election fraud charges filed against him, which disqualified him from taking an oath of office.

=== Border barrier ===
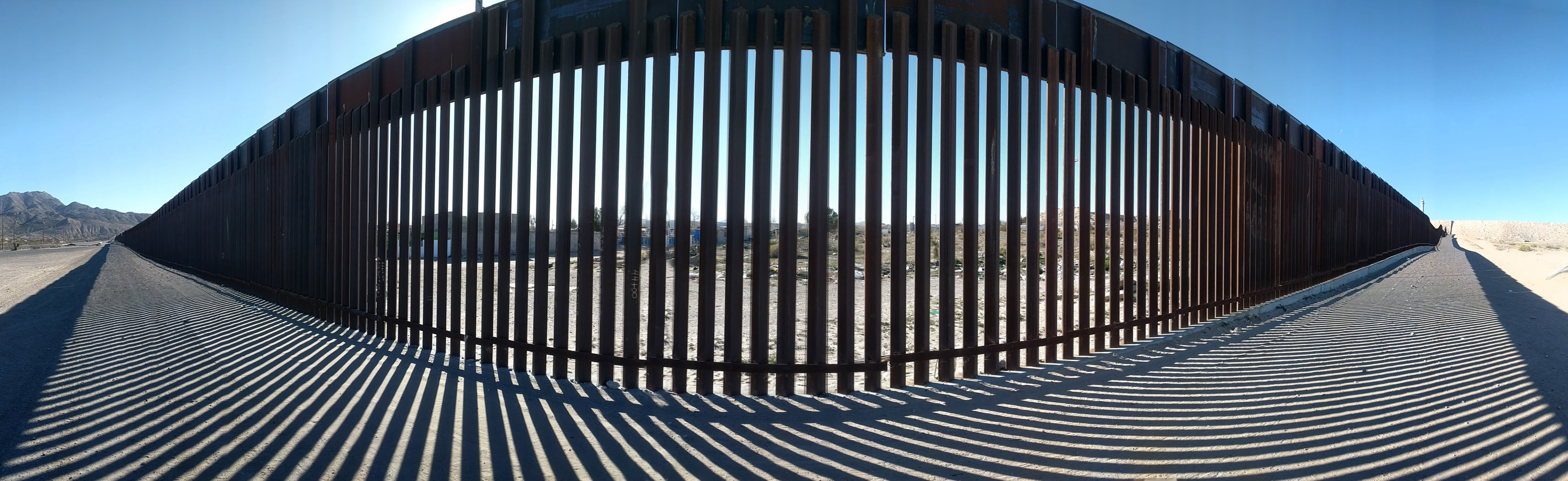
This stretch of wall between Sunland Park and Anapra, Mexico, was planned during the Obama administration.

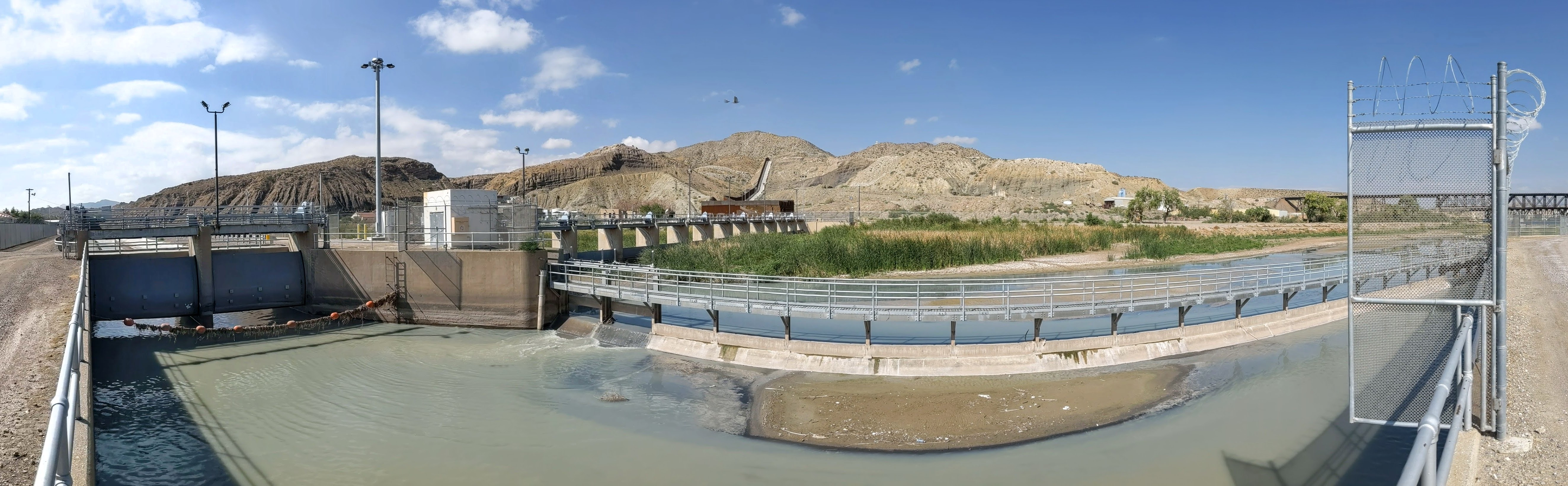
This short stretch running up Mount Cristo Rey from the American Dam, in the background of this photo, was built by We Build the Wall.

A private organization, named We Build the Wall built a 0.5-mile wall on at the border of Sunland Park and Mexico in 2019. Privately financed using a GoFundMe campaign, the wall was built on private property but the gate they constructed blocked access needed to maintain a federal dam. The barrier in Sunland Park also blocked access to Monument One, an official marker of the International Boundary and Water Commission that was set where New Mexico, Texas and the Mexican state of Chihuahua converge. Lighting along the stretch was shut off in 2021 after the group failed to pay electricity bills, and the owner of the land upon which the wall stood owed property taxes and penalties. The group's leaders built only two small stretches of wall/fencing, while defrauding donors of hundreds of thousands of dollars, which were diverted to personal expenses. Among the group's organizers, Brian Kolfage pleaded guilty to wire fraud conspiracy and a tax offense; Steve Bannon was also criminally charged, but accepted a pardon from Donald Trump during his final hours as US President.

== Geography ==
According to the United States Census Bureau, Sunland Park has a total area of 11.6 square miles (30.1 km^{2}), of which 11.4 square miles (29.5 km^{2}) is land and 0.2 square miles (0.6 km^{2}), or 2.02%, is covered by water.

Sunland Park is the only U.S. border town to the south of the Rio Grande. The city sits close to the unincorporated community of Santa Teresa, New Mexico, another border town.

== Economy and points of interest ==
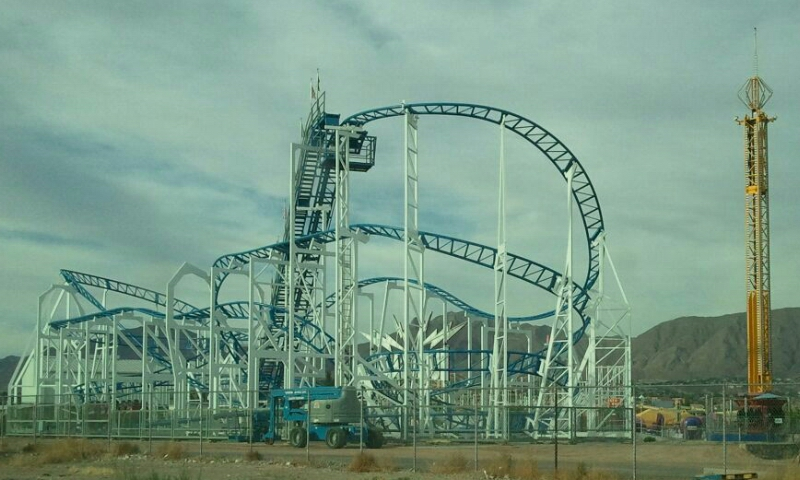
Western Playland Amusement Park

The Sunland Park Racetrack & Casino is located in the city; in the 2010s, it was the main economic driver of the city, which suffers from a high poverty rate. After New Mexico began legal sales of marijuana for recreational use in 2022, a booming marijuana economy sprung up in Sunland Park, sustained primarily by Texans who travel to New Mexico to purchase marijuana, as recreational marijuana sales are prohibited in Texas. As of January 2024, sixteen marijuana dispensaries operated in Sunland Park, the second-most in the state (after Albuquerque, which has a much larger population).

Although the town sits on the U.S.-Mexico border, there is no port of entry in the town. It is the location of the International Boundary Marker No. 1, U.S. and Mexico, the easternmost US-Mexico border marker.

Western Playland, an amusement park, moved to Sunland Park in 2006, after it left its original location in El Paso County, Texas's Ascarate Park, where it had opened in 1960. The park shut down in November 2021, but reopened in 2023 under new ownership.

== Demographics ==
Historical population
Census	Pop.	Note	%±
1990	8,179		—
2000	13,309		62.7%
2010	14,106		6.0%
2020	16,702		18.4%
U.S. Decennial Census

=== 2020 census ===
As of the 2020 census, Sunland Park had a population of 16,702. The median age was 32.3 years. 29.9% of residents were under the age of 18 and 11.7% of residents were 65 years of age or older. For every 100 females there were 92.7 males, and for every 100 females age 18 and over there were 88.6 males age 18 and over.

96.6% of residents lived in urban areas, while 3.4% lived in rural areas.

There were 5,084 households in Sunland Park, of which 47.6% had children under the age of 18 living in them. Of all households, 51.4% were married-couple households, 14.7% were households with a male householder and no spouse or partner present, and 28.5% were households with a female householder and no spouse or partner present. About 15.6% of all households were made up of individuals and 6.4% had someone living alone who was 65 years of age or older.

There were 5,415 housing units, of which 6.1% were vacant. The homeowner vacancy rate was 0.9% and the rental vacancy rate was 5.6%.

Racial composition as of the 2020 census
Race	Number	Percent
White	4,802	28.8%
Black or African American	117	0.7%
American Indian and Alaska Native	193	1.2%
Asian	55	0.3%
Native Hawaiian and Other Pacific Islander	6	0.0%
Some other race	4,776	28.6%
Two or more races	6,753	40.4%
Hispanic or Latino (of any race)	15,553	93.1%

=== 2010 census ===
As of the 2010 census, 14,267 people, 3,884 households, and 3,314 families resided in the city. The population density was 1,260.6 people/mi^{2} (486.7 people/km^{2}). The 4,131 housing units averaged 342.6 units per square mile (132.3 units/km^{2}). The racial makeup of the city was 76.00% White, 0.63% African American, 0.51% Native American, 0.2% Asian, 0.01% Pacific Islander, 26.02% from other races, and 2.76% from two or more races. Hispanics or Latinos of any race were 96.44% of the population.

Of the 3,884 households, 44.3% had children under the age of 18 living with them, 55% were married couples living together, 24% had a female householder with no husband present, and 11.5% were not families. About 12.6% of all households were made up of individuals, and 3.9% had someone living alone who was 65 years of age or older. The average household size was 3.63 and the average family size was 3.97.

In the city, the population was distributed as 37.5% under the age of 18, 11.9% from 20 to 24, 7.6% from 25 to 29, 6.6% from 45 to 64, and 7.5% who were 65 years of age or older. The median age was 28.8 years. For every 100 females, there were 93.5 males. For every 100 females age 18 and over, there were 88.4 males.

== Government ==
Sunland Park is led by a mayor and a city council. In the mayor's absence, the powers of the mayor are exercised by a mayor pro tem. In the event of a vacancy in the mayor's seat between elections, the council selects a mayor by appointment. There is also a city manager. City politics are often fractious, and in the 2010s, local politics were marred by a series of scandals.

== Education ==
Sunland Park is served by the Gadsden Independent School District, which operates these schools located in the city:

- Santa Teresa High School
- Santa Teresa Middle School
- Desert View Elementary School
- Riverside Elementary School
- Sunland Park Elementary School

Sunland Park also has a branch campus of Doña Ana Community College, a two-year college branch of New Mexico State University.

== Infrastructure ==
Water is supplied by the Camino Real Regional Utility Authority.

== Points of interest ==
- Mt. Cristo Rey
