= Urbici Soler i Manonelles =

Spanish artist (1890–1953)

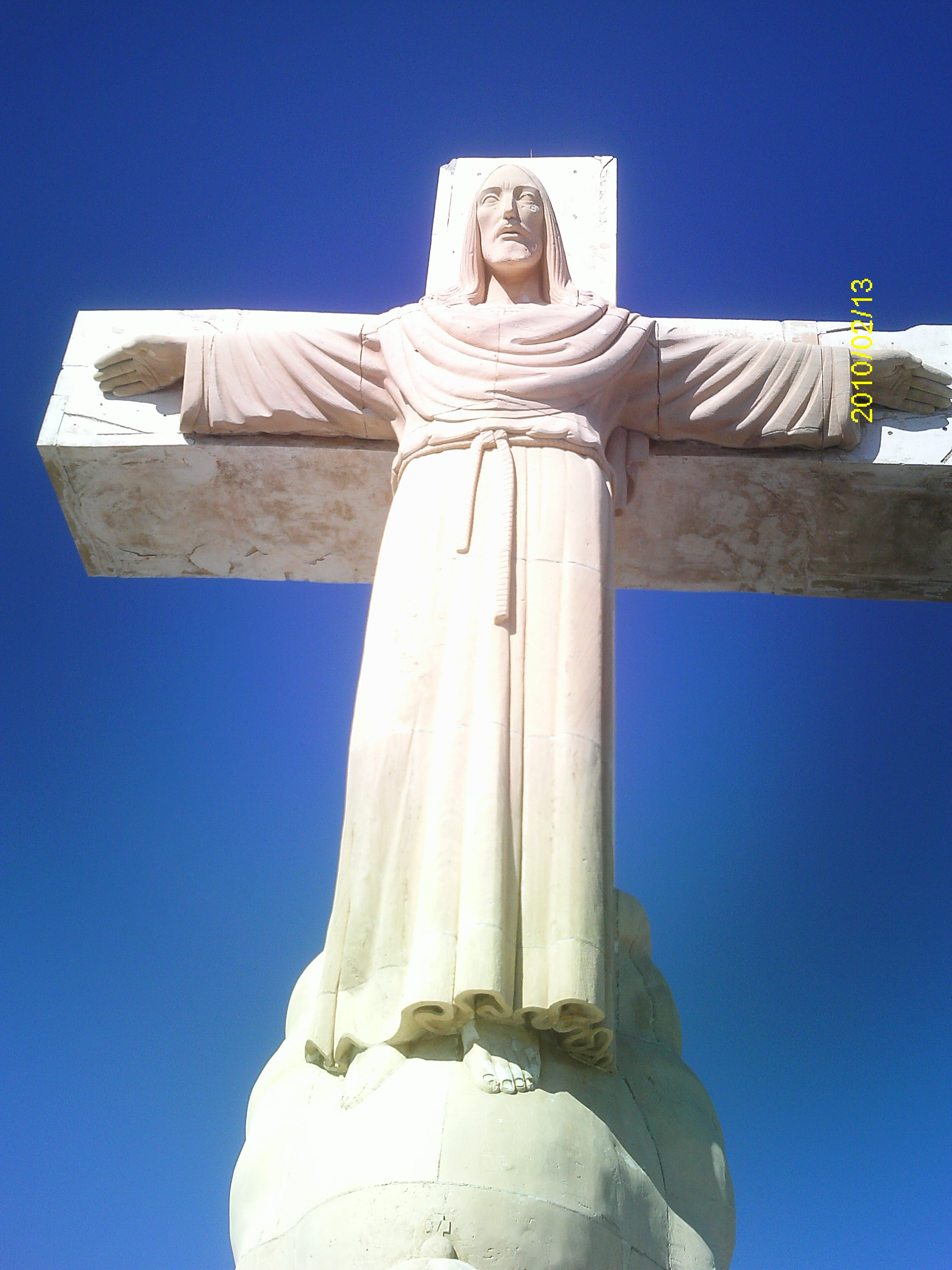
The cross on the top of Mount Cristo Rey

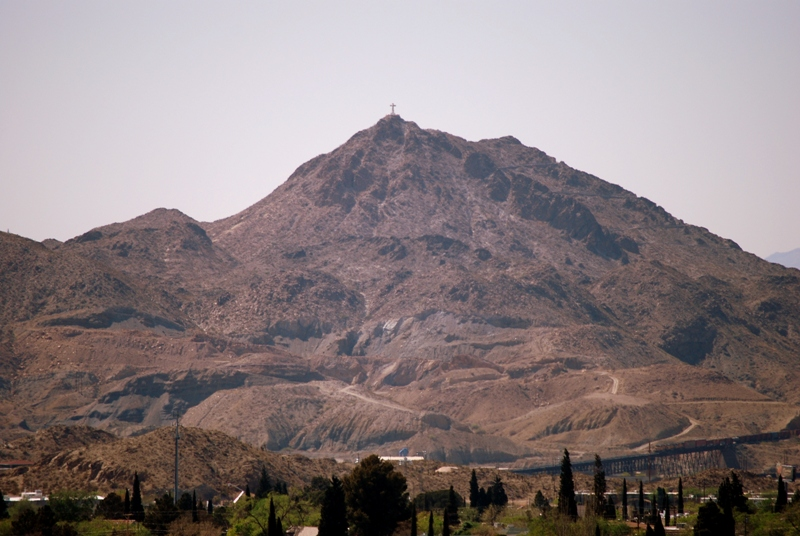
Mount Cristo Rey, Sunland Park, New Mexico, across the Rio Grande from El Paso, Texas

Urbici Soler (Urbici Soler i Manonelles) (1890–1953) was an American sculptor and art educator. He is remembered chiefly for Cristo Rey (Spanish for 'Christ the King'), a monumental statue of Jesus on a cross (a crucifix) that stands atop Mount Cristo Rey in the El Paso suburb of Sunland Park, New Mexico. (Note: Celebratory masses on the Feast of Christ the King and a pilgrimage to the top of the mountain are held annually in October. The Stations of the Cross line the trail up the mountainside. By tradition, the mass ends with the shout Long live Christ the King.) Completed in 1939, the monument has been a site of Roman Catholic pilgrimage.

== Life ==
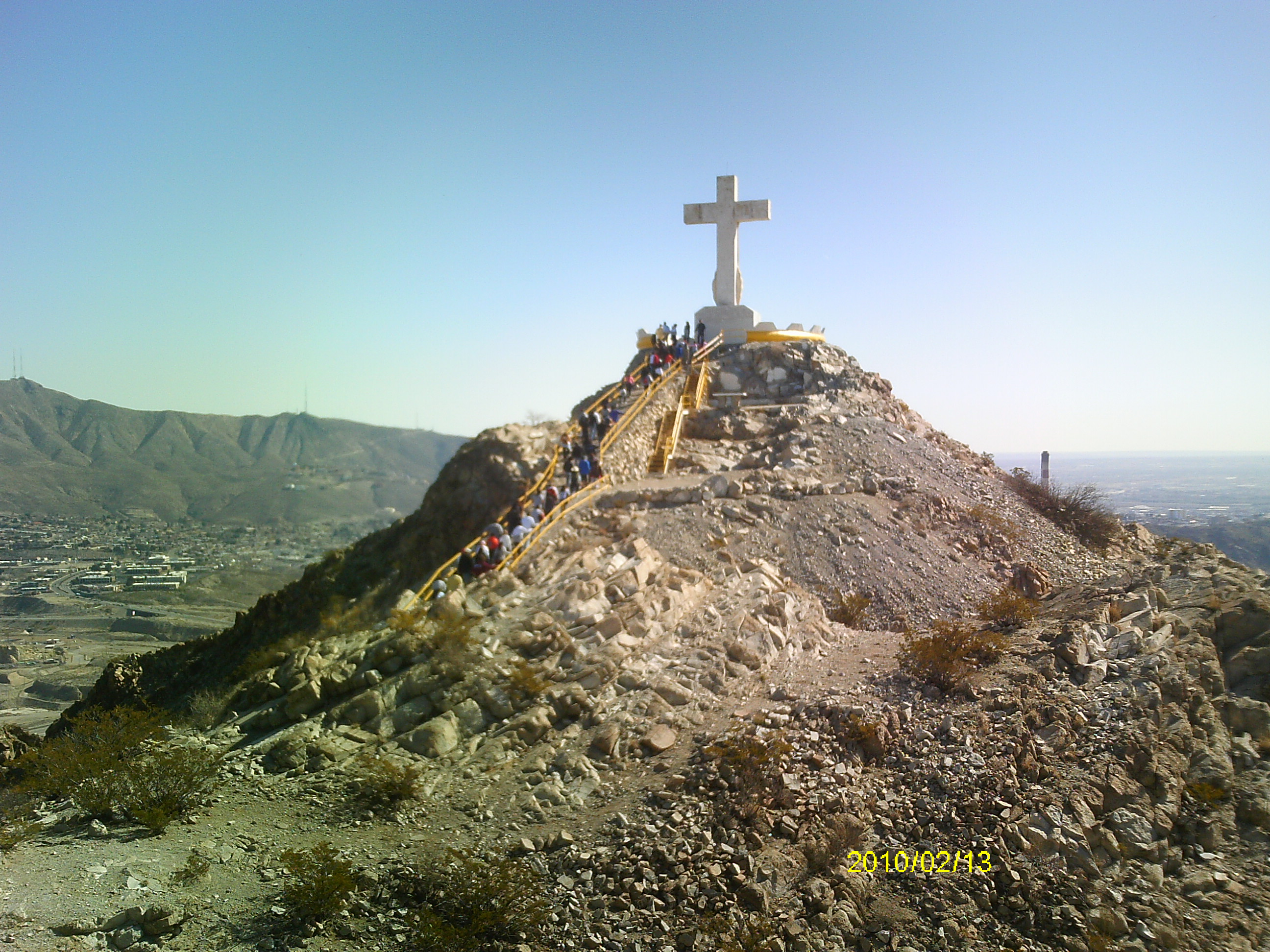
Pilgrims heading up to the cross

Urbici Soler was born on June 21, 1890, in Ferran, Lleida, in Catalonia, Spain. He was a student of Pere Carbonell i Huguet. Soler also studied at night at the Escola de la Llotja in Barcelona. In 1913, Soler became a student of Adolph von Hildebrand in Munich. He completed his first monumental sculpture, Princess María de la Paz, in 1918, and studied with Emile Antoine Bourdelle in Paris before returning to Spain, when he was called to South America. Soler's most important collection, The World, is a study of the native peoples of Mexico, Central America, and South America. The Spanish Civil War prevented his return to Spain. In 1937 he was called to work on Christ the King.

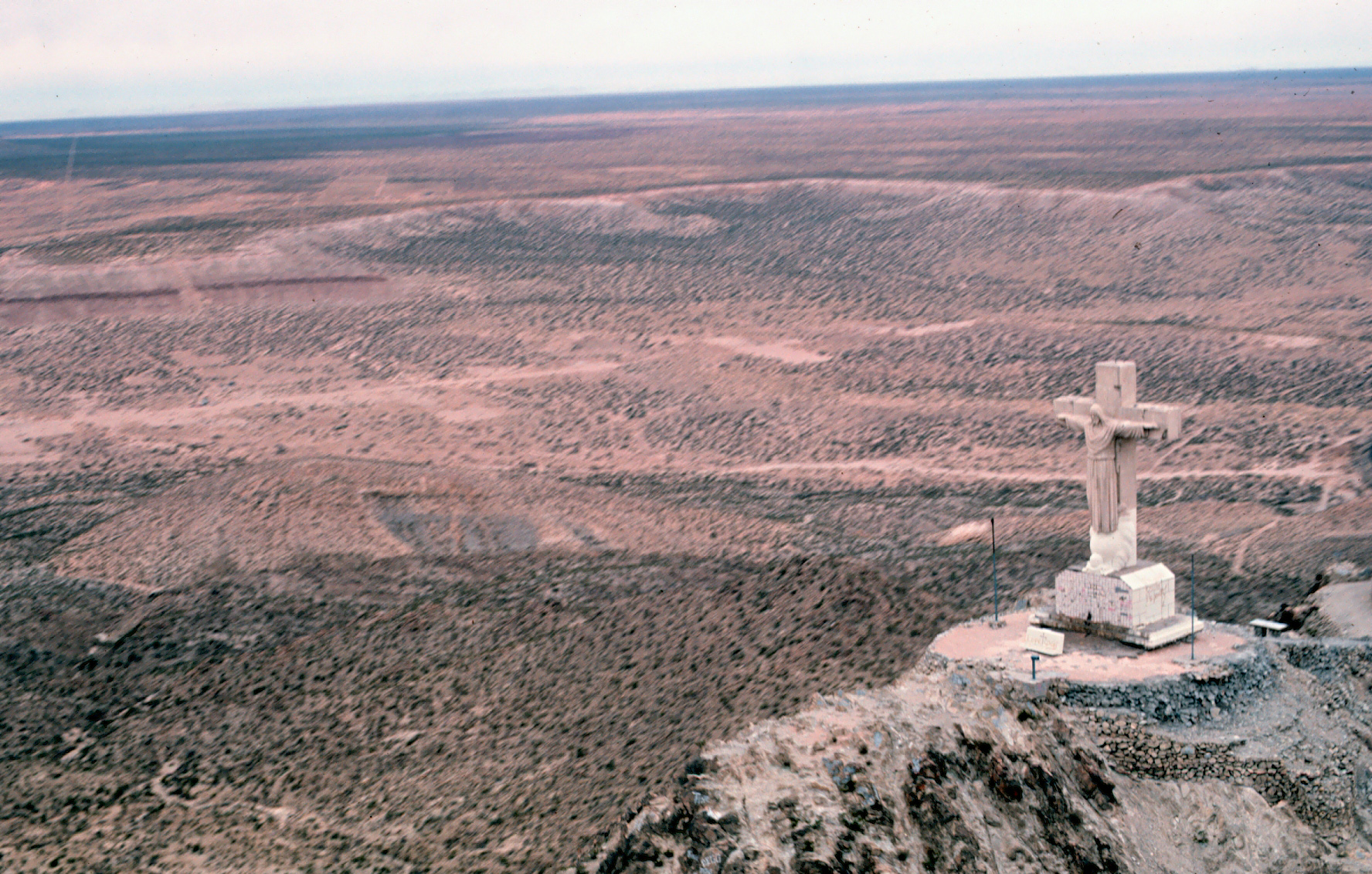
Another view of Christ the King

Soler was twice married, including a brief marriage in 1940 to Bettie Binkley of Santa Fe, New Mexico. Neither marriage was successful. He then moved to New Orleans, California, New York, and South America in 1943, returning to El Paso in 1945 to attempt further work on Christ the King, and joined the faculty of the Texas School of Mines, now called the University of Texas at El Paso. He became a US citizen in 1949. Soler built a house at the foot of Mount Cristo Rey in Anapra, New Mexico, (now part of Sunland Park) and lived there until his death on January 15, 1953. The Texas Historical Commission placed a marker at his gravesite in Evergreen Cemetery in El Paso in 1984.

== Christ the King statue ==
The statue Christ the King was inspired by a papal call for mementos of the 1900th anniversary of the coming of Christ. The project was begun at the behest of Father Lourdes Costa, pastor of the Smeltertown parish, which covered both the New Mexico and the Texas sides of the Rio Grande. Costa received funding from the Diocese of El Paso to purchase 200 acres (81 ha) from the New Mexico Public Land Office for the statue, and to build a cross. Costa first erected a wood cross, then a steel cross built by the efforts of the Smeltertown parish, on the summit of Cerro de Muleros (now Mount Cristo Rey), the northernmost peak of the Juarez Mountains, located on the border of the United States and Mexico. Costa, like Soler, was Catalan, and Soler stayed with him while working on the statue.

The statue is 40 feet (12 m) tall, including a 9-foot (2.7 m) base, and is composed of concrete, steel and Cordovan cream limestone which was quarried near Austin, Texas. The blocks were chosen by Soler and winched up the mountain. Soler carved it on site with an air chisel. The head of the statue is elongated so that the figure appears of natural proportions when viewed from below. The statue is not technically a crucifix, as the palms of Christ face downward in a gesture of blessing. The statue was completed in 1939 and dedicated in 1940. The diocese ran short of money, but Soler completed the front of the statue with his own funds. (Note: After the success of the project, Cerro de Muleros (Mule Drivers' Mountain) was renamed Mount Cristo Rey. In 1991, a lightning strike damaged the statue and dislodged several limestone blocks, which were retrieved from down the mountainside.)

On May 7, 2026, the federal government filed an eminent domain claim in the United States District Court of New Mexico. The Mexico–United States border wall stops at the base of Mount Cristo Rey, but the federal government argues the wall must be built across the mountain. United States Customs and Border Protection officials claimed an offer was made for the land but that the Catholic Church refuses to sell. The Diocese of Las Cruces asked a federal judge to stop the action, saying the site is sacred and a wall would block pilgrims from visiting.

== Works by Soler ==
- Cabeza de Estudio (1907)
- Princess María de la Paz (1918)
- The World, 1920s - 1940s, a collection of studies of native peoples
- Charlotte Dahmen Chao (1925)
- Diego Rivera (1931), sandstone
- Abelardo Rodríguez (1932)
- Enrique González Martínez (1934)
- Cristo Rey (1939), limestone
- Tom Lea (1946) bronze
- Fresia (1946), hardwood
- Mater Dolorosa (1950), modernist
- Caupolican (1930) bronze
