= International Boundary Marker No. 1, U.S. and Mexico =

Monument

- U.S. National Register of Historic Places
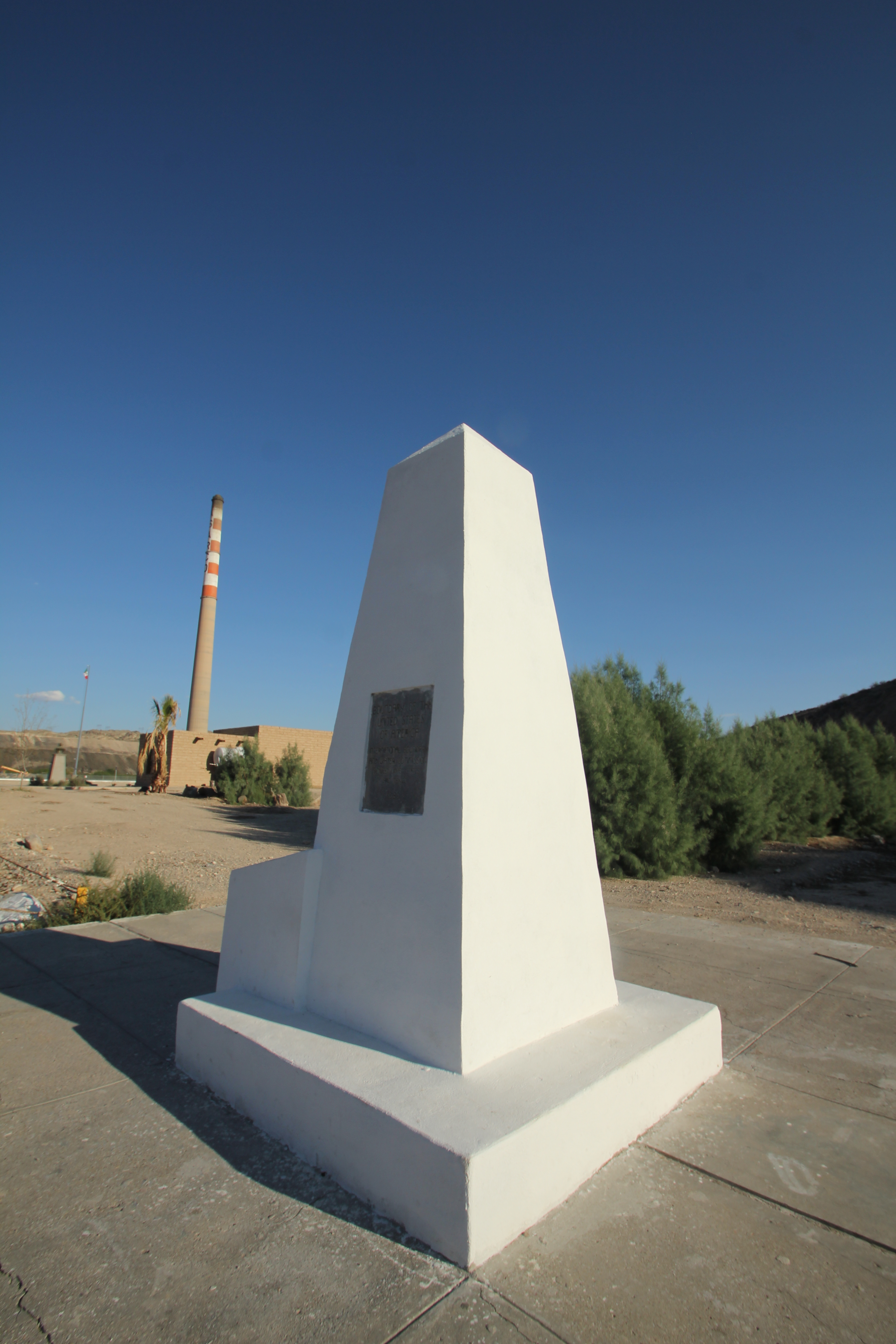

- Location within New Mexico
- Nearest city: El Paso, Texas
- Coordinates: 31.783889°N 106.529755°W
- Area: 0.1 acres (0.040 ha)
- Built: 1855
- Built by: Emory–Salazar Commission
- NRHP reference No.: 74001195
- Added to NRHP: September 10, 1974

International Boundary Marker No. 1, U.S. and Mexico is a monument on the Mexico–U.S. border, on the west bank of the Rio Grande River near El Paso, Texas. It was listed on the National Register of Historic Places in 1974 and designated as a National Historic Civil Engineering Landmark by the American Society of Civil Engineers in 1976.

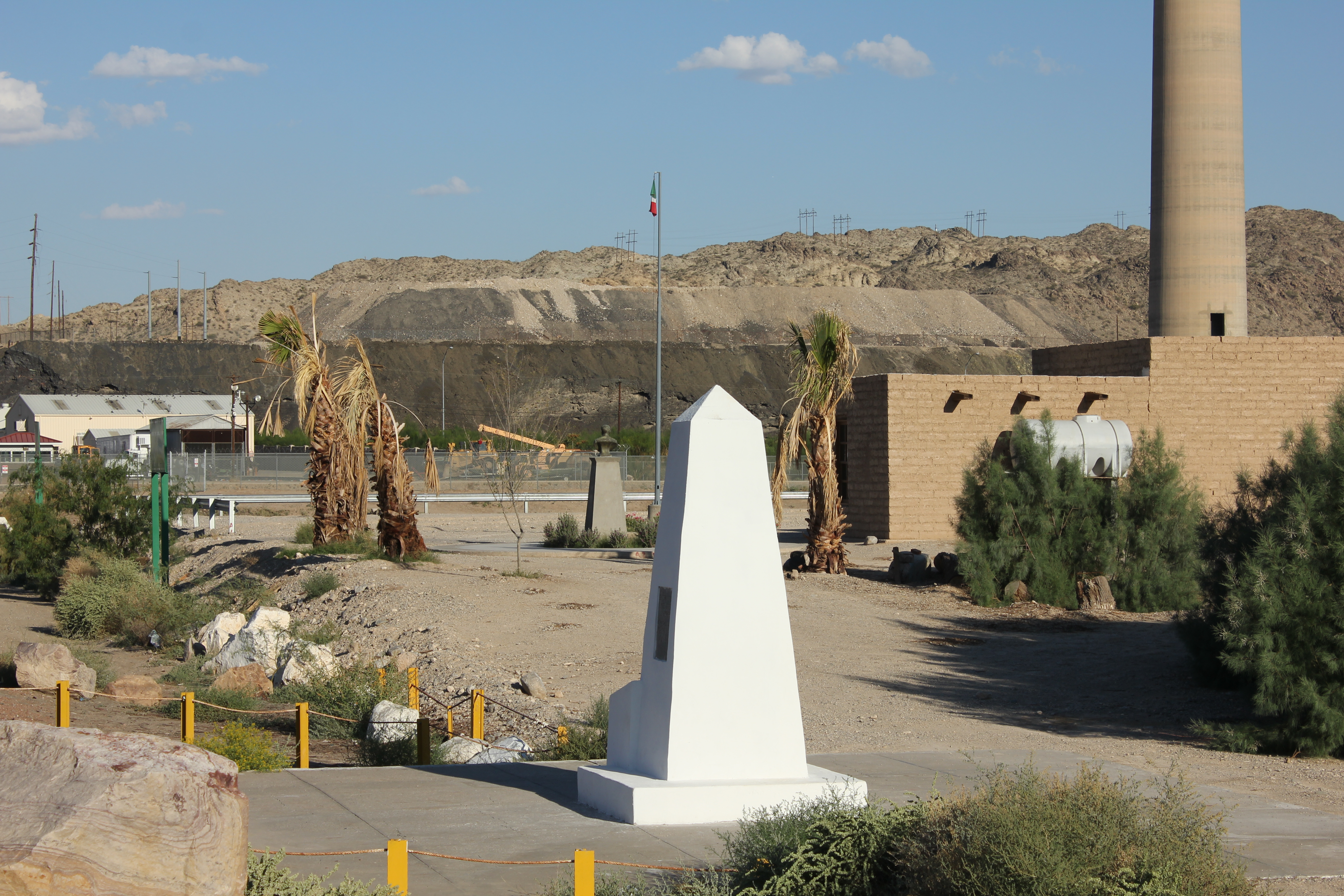
Photo from northwest in 2012

The monument was placed there in 1855 by the Emory–Salazar Commission. It is a dressed cut stone monument 12 feet (3.7 m) tall, 5 by 5 feet (1.5 m × 1.5 m) at its base and 2.5 by 2.5 feet (0.76 m × 0.76 m) at its top. The monument was repaired in 1892 by the Barlow–Blanco Commission, and again in 1929 by the International Boundary Commission. It was repainted in 1933 and in 1959, the latter time by the International Boundary and Water Commission (IBWC). It was refurbished in 1966 by both sections of the IBWC, which stripped its old plaster coating down to the original masonry monument and re-faced it with white marbleized concrete. A 9 by 9 metres (30 ft × 30 ft) concrete slab platform was added then, too.

It has also been known as Western Land Boundary Marker No. 1, U.S. and Mexico.

It is located in Doña Ana County, New Mexico, west of El Paso off Interstate 10.

== Border wall dispute ==
In June 2019, the International Boundary and Water Commission (IBWC) determined that We Build the Wall (WBtW) had built its wall across federally owned land and had built and locked a gate across a road leading to Monument One, without required permits. The IBWC also accused WBtW of installing a gate for the wall on federal land in lieu of proper permits or authorizations, while illegally preventing access to waterways and a public monument. WBtW and the IBWC eventually resolved their dispute. As a result, the gate is kept open during the day and closed and locked at night.
