= Brian Kolfage =

US Air Force veteran and convicted felon

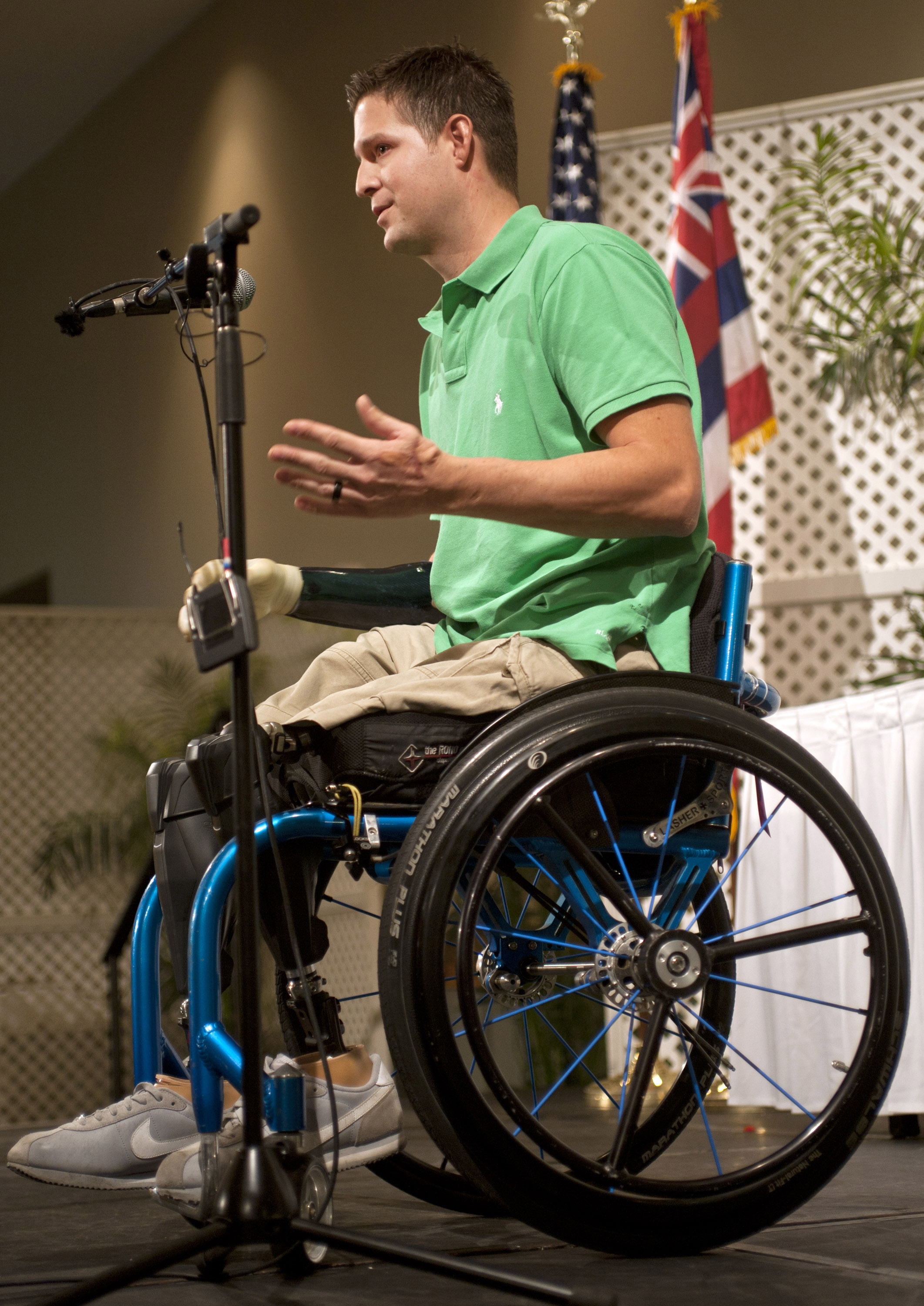
- Kolfage in 2012
- Born: September 21, 1982 (age 43); Detroit, Michigan, U.S.
- Education: University of Arizona (BA)
- Known for: Founding We Build the Wall, pleading guilty to federal wire fraud conspiracy and tax charges.
- Political party: Republican
- Criminal charges: Conspiracy to commit wire fraud, conspiracy to commit money laundering, tax fraud
- Criminal penalty: 51 months (4 years, 4 months) in Federal prison, forfeiture of $17,872,106, restitution of $2,877,414 and three years of supervised release after completion of prison term.
- Criminal status: removed from FMC Rochester and moved to Residential Reentry Management Orlando, Florida.
- Spouses: Ashley Kolfage (m. 2011; div. 2025); Nikki Grounds (m. 2005; div. ?)
- Children: 2
- Awards: Purple Heart
- Military career
- Branch: United States Air Force
- Rank: Senior Airman

Brian Kolfage is an American far-right political activist, former United States Air Force airman, and convicted felon, currently serving a prison sentence at FMC Rochester.

He co-founded We Build the Wall, a private organization that purportedly aimed to construct a privately funded barrier on the Mexico–United States border; he pleaded guilty in 2022 to federal fraud and tax crimes for defrauding donors to the group.

Kolfage is a triple amputee who suffered injuries during the Iraq War while serving with the U.S. Air Force. He later became a right-wing political activist who established a ring of conspiracy theory-promoting clickbait websites. In December 2018, Kolfage initiated a fundraising campaign ostensibly to build U.S. President Donald Trump's proposed U.S.–Mexico border barrier extension for a nonprofit organization called "We Build the Wall, Inc.," which ultimately raised $25 million, mostly from GoFundMe and other online crowdfunding. The organization constructed a 0.5-to-1-mile (0.80 to 1.61 km) fence near El Paso, Texas on private land adjoining the border using $6–8 million of the donated funds. It claimed that it planned to construct further barriers on private lands adjoining the border with Mexico in Texas and California, but never did so.

In August 2020, Kolfage was indicted, along with Steve Bannon and two other co-defendants, on federal charges of defrauding hundreds of thousands of We Build the Wall donors by diverting money that was raised to personal use. Federal prosecutors said that the defendants, despite telling donors that Kolfage would not be paid, schemed to divert $350,000 to Kolfage, "which he used to fund his lavish lifestyle." Kolfage was separately indicted in May 2021 on federal charges of defrauding the IRS and filing false tax returns.

Kolfage pleaded guilty in 2022 to one count of wire fraud conspiracy and two counts of filing a false tax return (for failing to report the diverted income); a co-defendant, Andrew Badolato, also pleaded guilty to fraud. In April 2023, he was sentenced to four years and three months in prison, and ordered to pay $25 million in restitution. In July 2023, he was imprisoned at Federal Medical Center Rochester (Rochester, Minnesota) where he is serving his sentence and is due to be released in November 2026.

== Early life, military service and education ==
Kolfage was born in Michigan and grew up in Hawaii. He graduated in 1999 from Kaimuki High School in Honolulu. He joined the U.S. Air Force and, in 2001, was assigned to the 17th squadron of the Air Force Security Forces, stationed at Goodfellow Air Force Base. He was stationed in Kuwait in 2004, he volunteered to go to Balad Air Base in Iraq, where he was deployed as an air-cargo inspector.

Kolfage was injured in Balad on September 11, 2004, after a missile exploded three feet away from him after he left his quarters. He lost both legs and his right hand, and received a Purple Heart for his injuries. He was hospitalized for nearly a year at Walter Reed Medical Center, leaving the hospital in July 2005. After his discharge from Walter Reed, he took a civilian job at the Davis-Monthan Air Force Base until enrolling in college. He attended the University of Arizona on a scholarship from the Pat Tillman Foundation, and graduated from its School of Architecture in 2014.

After his injury he began to speak publicly about his experience and recovery. He filmed a campaign ad for Democratic Representative Gabby Giffords, and was invited as Giffords's special guest to President Obama's State of the Union address in 2012.

== Personal life ==
Kolfage married his first wife, Nikki (née Grounds), in 2004 at Walter Reed National Military Medical Center, during his recovery from his military-service injuries.

During his time at Goodfellow, he met his second wife, Ashley (née Goetz), whom he married in 2011. Kolfage lived in Tucson, Arizona, for almost a decade before moving with his wife to Florida, where they settled in Miramar Beach. Ashley filed for divorce in July 2024 and the marriage was dissolved in January 2025.

== Business ventures ==
=== Fake news websites and social media activity ===
By 2013, Kolfage began to spread conspiracy theories on social media.

After becoming a right-wing political activist, Kolfage established various business ventures, including various fake news websites that promoted clickbait and conspiracy theories.

He ramped up his online presence in 2015. Sites that Kolfage either owned or was closely associated with included Freedom Daily; Keep America First; Right Wing News; Trump Republic; and VeteranAF. They were heavily promoted on Facebook. In text messages, Kolfage claimed that his websites and Facebook pages netted him up to $200,000 a month. The Independent noted that the websites relied on outrage-inducing headlines, "often false, racist and provocative—to increase viewership and shares"; headlines featured on the website included "Obnoxious Black People Lose Their Minds When Victoria Secret Models Say This 1 Word On Live Video" and "Trump Just Released Embarrassing Vids Of Obama's Muslim Friends That He Never Wanted Seen." He also began writing articles for website The Blaze. Kolfage repeatedly denied owning Freedom Daily, but NBC News reported in 2019 that "former employees and competitors, most of whom asked for anonymity out of fear of retribution, provided company emails, employment documents and company checks that show Kolfage's home address as Freedom Daily's corporate business address."

In October 2018, all of Kolfage's Facebook news pages – as well as his "Military Grade Coffee" page – were taken down as part of Facebook's purge of spam and "inauthentic activity" sites. Facebook cited Kolfage's creation of multiple fake accounts and posting of "ad farms" links.

Kolfage frequently used social media to personally attack detractors and promote misinformation against those he perceived as opponents, including progressives, fellow veterans, and former conservative allies. Kolfage's vilification of his critics on social media led to his followers targeting the critics with invective, harassment, and death threats. After a Catholic priest of the La Lomita Chapel (a historic Catholic site whose land was threatened by the wall) opposed the project, Kolfage smeared him as a promoter of "human trafficking and abuse of women and children." Other social media targets of Kolfage included the National Butterfly Center, which is located adjacent to a border fence constructed in the Rio Grande Valley. In 2019, Kolfage posted 30 tweets attacking the butterfly center, attacking it as "left-wing thugs with a sham butterfly agenda" and accusing the center of supporting "illegal immigration and sex trafficking of women and children." Kolfage also lashed out at the International Boundary and Water Commission and the mayor of Sunland Park, New Mexico, blaming the latter for moving too slowly to grant border-wall permits.

In 2013, Kolfage shared a fabricated image of a post from a Massachusetts woman, doctored so that it appeared she had called disabled veterans worthless; after Kolfage shared the content, the woman, as well as her elderly mother, were inundated with hundreds of violent threats online and in menacing phone calls. The case led to civil litigation in the U.S. District Court for the District of Arizona, in 2015, Kolfage issued a formal apology to the woman.

Kolfage closed his Twitter feed after he was indicted on federal charges, but in September 2020, he re-launched his account to promote his claim that the criminal prosecution against him is a politically motivated "witch hunt." Kolfage's social media rants prompted federal prosecutors to complain that Kolfage's statements had "the potential to taint a future jury pool." A federal judge issued a warning to Kolfage but declined to issue a gag order.

=== Fundraising lists ===
In addition to his Facebook pages and websites, Kolfage also ran many online fundraising campaigns. Through his border-wall campaign, Kolfage claimed to have amassed 3.5 million email addresses as well as phone numbers and names, a formidable asset in support of pro-Trump efforts. In 2019, NBC News reported that "according to former employees and public records including website archives, Nevada business registrations, and property records, Kolfage has repeatedly created GoFundMe campaigns and published inflammatory fake news articles, pushing them both from websites that he sought to hide behind shell companies and false identities, in part to harvest email addresses" which were "then used to push people back to Kolfage's websites, to sell a brand of coffee he owns, or to be stockpiled for future use by conservative campaigns." During the 2020 political campaigns, Kolfage reportedly offered his list to a Republican fundraising consultant, proposing to keep half of any revenue the list generated.

=== America First Medical ===
In February 2020, Kolfage started a medical-equipment company America First Medical amid growing alarm about COVID-19-related personal-protective-equipment (PPE) shortages. He told Reuters that he planned for the company to acquire N95 respirators from stockpiles he had found around the world, broker large-volume sales of them, and collect up to 3% of every total sale. He did not explain where the alleged stockpiles were located, nor how he found them.

In March 2020, Kolfage ordered a total of 25 million masks for America First Medical from MAMS Global Trading House (a manufacturer and distributor of power tools and safety equipment based in Dubai). The first order was for 10 million masks, for a total of $1.5 million. According to documents detailing the transaction, AFM agreed to wire half of the money ($750,000) up front, and the rest when the masks were delivered.

The deal was not successfully concluded. MAMS' CEO said before the company received payment, Kolfage disputed the transaction with his bank and reported the company as fraudulent to Dubai police. Kolfage also asked his bank to place the $750,000 in his personal account instead of the AFM account. The bank denied the request.

== "We Build the Wall, Inc." scam ==
=== Origins ===
In December 2018, Kolfage, along with fellow Trump allies, started an attempt to raise $1 billion via GoFundMe for the construction of a border wall between the United States and Mexico. Kolfage said the target figure was achievable, adding "This won't be easy, but it's our duty as citizens." In an email to the Washington Post, Kolfage stated that he began the fundraiser as "political games from both parties" have been holding back funding for the wall. Within three days, over $9 million had been raised.

Kolfage was one of four co-founders of the group. His three co-founders were Steve Bannon, a former senior advisor to Trump; Timothy Shea, a Castle Rock, Colorado businessman who ran a pro-Trump group; and Andrew Badolato, a financier based in Florida. Kolfage served as the public face of the group. The organization boasted on social media about its tie to Trump. Its advisory board was filled with Trump allies, including Erik Prince, the founder of the private military company Blackwater (later known as Academi); Tom Tancredo, a former Republican congressman from Colorado; and Curt Schilling.

In January 2019, Kolfage posted a message to the GoFundMe page that he had decided that raising money through a nonprofit would be more successful. A new 501(c)4 non-profit was created and called We Build the Wall Inc., through which Kolfage planned to have segments of the wall privately constructed through negotiations with landowners along the border. Funding was passed through an LLC operated by Shea.

In May 2019, the organization constructed a 0.5-to-1-mile (0.80 to 1.61 km) "weathered steel" bollard fence near El Paso, Texas on private land adjoining the border using $6–8 million of the donated funds. The group claimed that it planned to construct further barriers on private lands adjoining the border with Mexico in Texas and California, but never did so.

The group was praised by Donald Trump Jr., who was a "special guest" at a July 2019 event hosted by the group; Trump Jr. praised the effort, saying: "This is what capitalism is all about. This is private enterprise at its finest. Doing it better, faster, cheaper than anything else. What you guys are doing is amazing."

Kris Kobach, the Republican former Kansas Secretary of State and now its Attorney General, was also involved. In 2019, during his campaign for the U.S. Senate, he sent out a campaign fundraiser using both the corporate name and email list of "Wall" donors. His involvement with "We Build the Wall," as 501(c)(4) organization, and use of the fundraising and campaign mailing lists it was accumulating, raised concerns, as 501(c)(4)s are legally prohibited from coordinating with federal campaigns.

=== Investigation and indictment ===
On August 20, 2020, Kolfage was indicted and arrested along with Steve Bannon and two other co-defendants (Andrew Badolato and Timothy Shea) on charges of defrauding donors to build a border wall along the Mexico–U.S. border and funneling the money for their own personal use; the case is pending in New York federal court. While Donald Trump issued a pardon to Bannon in the final hours of his presidency (before the case could come to trial), Trump did not pardon Kolfage or the other two indicted defendants. Because Bannon was pardoned, his ability to invoke his Fifth Amendment right against self-incrimination could be curtailed, meaning that Bannon could be called as a witness against his three former co-defendants, including Kolfage. Bannon's federal pardon did not shield him against prosecution for state crimes, and he was indicted in 2022 in New York state. Kolfage testified before a grand jury in Manhattan before Bannon's indictment.

In early May 2021, Kolfage was separately indicted by a grand jury in federal court in Pensacola, Florida on charges of fraud and filing false tax returns. The indictment charged Kolfage with knowingly underreporting his income to the IRS—specifically, by claiming an income of $63,000 in his 2019 tax return while failing to report more than $350,000 deposited into his personal bank account from "We Build the Wall" contributors and other sources."

=== Guilty plea and sentence ===
On April 21, 2022, Kolfage pleaded guilty to one count of conspiracy to commit wire fraud; one count of conspiracy to commit money laundering; and two counts of filing a false tax return (for failing to report the diverted income). A co-defendant, Andrew Badolato, also pleaded guilty to fraud. Shea had earlier been convicted, in an October 2021 trial.

Pleading guilty, Kolfage acknowledged that he induced donors to contribute to the group "in part through the misrepresentation that I would not profit from We Build the Wall or take a salary or compensation", and that he "knowingly and willingly conspired to receive money from the donations."

On April 26, 2023, U.S. District Judge Analisa Torres sentenced Kolfage to 51 months (4 years, 4 months) in federal prison, followed by three years of supervised release, and ordered him to forfeit $17,872,106, pay $2,877,414 in restitution. During the sentencing hearing, Kolfage expressed contrition, saying he was "disgusted, humiliated ... deeply sorry for" his crimes. Arguing for home incarceration, Kolfage's defense lawyers depicted him as merely a "symbolic leader" of the group, and cited his military service and expression of regret in arguing for a "home incarceration" sentence. In passing sentence, Torres called the scam "infamous" and said it injured not only the individual donors who were defrauded, but also the broader "body politic" because it produced "a chilling effect on civic participation in the political realm."

=== Imprisonment ===
On July 25, 2023, Kolfage started his sentence and was imprisoned as inmate 26978-017 at FMC Rochester (a Federal Medical Center Prison) in Rochester, Minnesota. Without any reduction in sentence or early release, he would have been released on January 25, 2027, however according to the Bureau of Prisons inmate lookup, he was no longer in custody as of March 6, 2026, with no reason for the earlier release (dates have changed at least six times since incarceration based on look BOP inmate lookup). Upon release, Kolfage will serve an additional three years of supervised release per his sentencing.
