= Brownsville, Texas =

- City
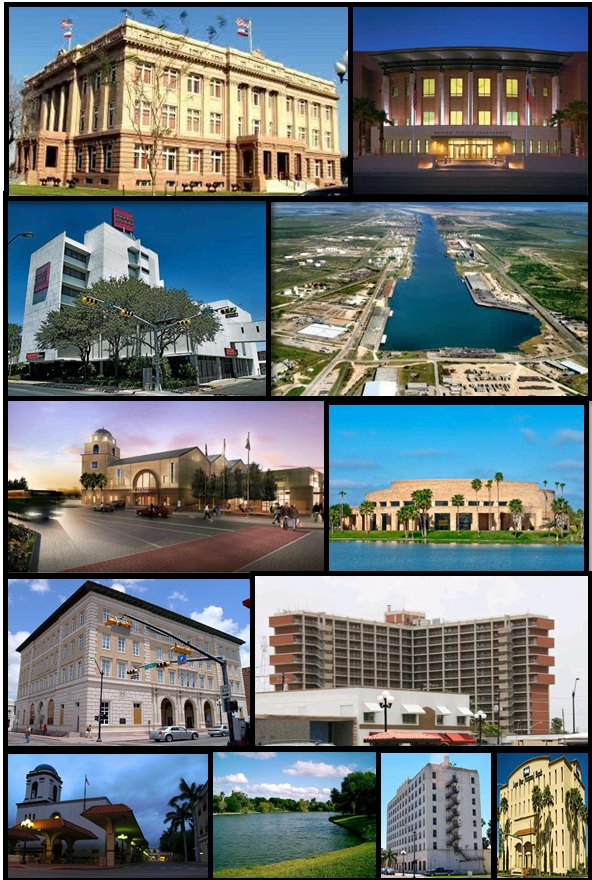
- Images from left to right, top to bottom Cameron County Courthouse (1914), Reynaldo G. Garza & Filemon B. Vela Courthouse, Cameron County Administrative Building, Port of Brownsville, La Plaza Multimodal Terminal, TSC Performing Arts Center, U.S. Post Office, Villa del Sol Apartments, Market Square, Resaca, Hotel El Jardin, Lone Star National Bank Tower

- Flag
- Nickname: Chess Capital of Texas
- Motto: "On the Border, By the Sea, and Beyond!"
- Location within Texas Location within the United States Location within North America
- Coordinates: 25°55′49″N 97°29′4″W
- Country: United States
- U.S. state: Texas
- County: Cameron
- Founded: 1848
- Incorporated: February 7, 1853
- Named for: Fort Brown, named for Jacob Brown

Government
  - Type: Council-manager
  - Mayor: John Cowen
  - City Council: Council members: John Cowen Jr.; Rose M. Z. Gowen; Nurith Galonsky Pizana; Jessica Tetreau-Kalifa; Joel Munguia; Ben Neece
  - City Manager: Helen Ramirez

Area
  - City: 145.19 sq mi (376.03 km^{2})
  - Land: 131.53 sq mi (340.66 km^{2})
  - Water: 13.66 sq mi (35.37 km^{2}) 4%
  - Metro: 349.72 sq mi (905.76 km^{2})
- Elevation: 33 ft (10 m)

Population (2020)
  - City: 186,738
  - Density: 1,420/sq mi (548.2/km^{2})
  - Urban^{[β]}: 216,444 (US: 178th)
  - Urban density: 3,485.3/sq mi (1,345.7/km^{2})
  - Metro: 421,017 (US: 130th)
  - Metro density: 472.5/sq mi (182.4/km^{2})
  - CSA: 441,181 (US: 94th)
- Demonym: Brownsvillian
- Time zone: UTC−6 (CST)
  - Summer (DST): UTC−5 (CDT)
- ZIP Codes: 78520–78523, 78526
- Area code: 956
- FIPS code: 48-10768
- GNIS feature ID: 1372749
- Airport: Brownsville/South Padre Island International Airport KBRO (BRO)
- Website: brownsvilletx.gov
- α. ^{^} ^{1} ^{2} Area, city density, metro population/density and CSA population/density as of the 2017 estimate. β. Urban population/density as of the 2020 Census.

Brownsville is a city in the U.S. state of Texas and the largest city and county seat of Cameron County, located on the western Gulf Coast in South Texas, adjacent to the border with Matamoros, Tamaulipas, Mexico. The city covers 145.2 sq mi (376.066 km^{2}), and had a population of 186,738 at the 2020 census. As of the 2020 U.S. census, it is the 136th-most populous city in the United States and 18th-most populous in Texas. It is part of the Matamoros–Brownsville metropolitan area. The city is known for its year-round subtropical climate, deep-water seaport, and Hispanic culture.

The city was founded in 1848 by American entrepreneur Charles Stillman after he developed a successful river-boat company nearby. It was named for Fort Brown, itself named after Major Jacob Brown, who fought and died while serving as a U.S. Army officer during the Mexican–American War (1846–1848). As a county seat, the city and county governments are major employers. Other primary employers fall within the service, trade, and manufacturing industries, including a growing aerospace and space transportation sector. It operates international trading through the Port of Brownsville. The city experienced a population increase in the early 1900s, when steel production flourished.

Due to significant historical events, the city has multiple houses and battle sites listed under the National Register of Historic Places. The city played a primary role in the Mexican–American War with the siege of Fort Texas and the first engagements of the war: The Battle of Palo Alto and the Battle of Resaca de la Palma. Several key events of the American Civil War took place in the city, such as the Battle of Brownsville and the Battle of Palmito Ranch. The city was also involved in the Texas Revolution. Brownsville's idiosyncratic geographic location has made it a wildlife refuge center. Several state parks and historical sites are protected by the Texas Parks and Wildlife Department.

Brownsville has a predominantly Hispanic population, which at 93.9% is the fourth-highest proportion of Hispanic Americans of any city in the United States outside of Puerto Rico.

== History ==
=== Founding ===
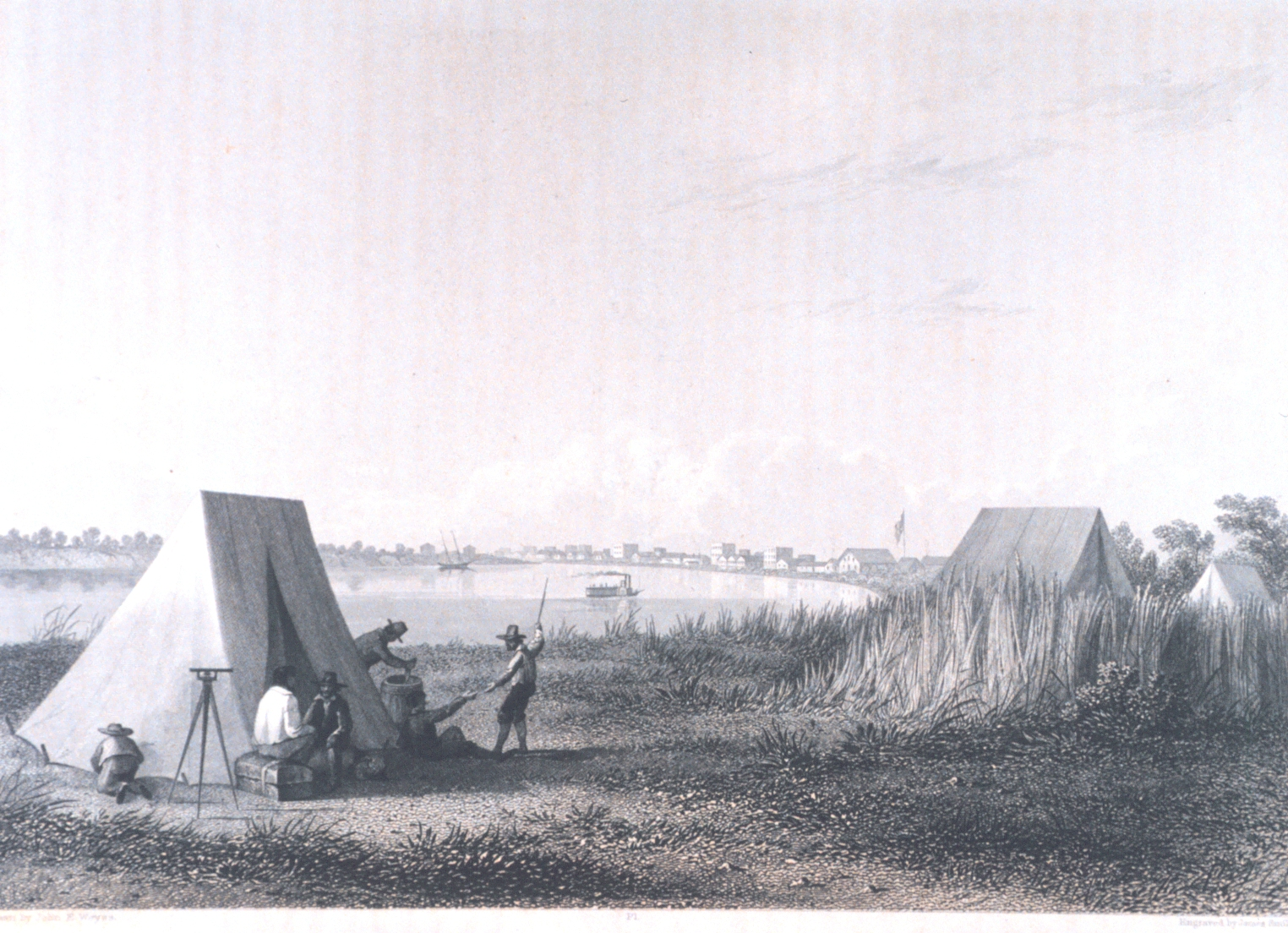
Brownsville in 1857

In 1781, Spanish government officials granted José Salvador de la Garza 59 leagues of land (408 sq mi). He used the land to construct a ranch several miles northwest of the area. During the early 1800s, Brownsville was known to residents as los tejidos (English: "pasturelands"). Settler presence grew around 1836 when Texas colonial rule declared its independence from Mexico. On February 4, 1846, United States President James K. Polk instructed American General Zachary Taylor and his troops, including 2nd LT. Ulysses S. Grant, to begin moving south towards what was still remembered as los tejidos. Once Taylor arrived, he built Fort Texas. It was later renamed Fort Brown for Major Jacob Brown, one of two American soldiers who died during the siege of Fort Texas.

Charles Stillman arrived in Matamoros in 1828 from Connecticut to help his father in the cotton trade. Brownsville became part of Texas after the signing of the Treaty of Guadalupe Hidalgo in 1848. During that year, Stillman formed a partnership with Samuel Belden and Simon Mussina to form the Brownsville Town Company. They reportedly sold lots valued at $1,500 following displacement of prior residents. Brownsville was originally established as a U.S. recognized city in late 1848 following Stillman's colonization efforts, and was made the county seat of Cameron County on January 13, 1849. The state originally incorporated the city on January 24, 1850. This was repealed on April 1, 1852, because of a land-ownership dispute between Stillman and its former owners (including Juan Cortina, a Mexican rancher). The state reincorporated the city on February 7, 1853; this remains in effect. The issue of ownership was not decided until 1879, when the United States Supreme Court ruled in favor of Stillman.

=== Mexican–American War ===
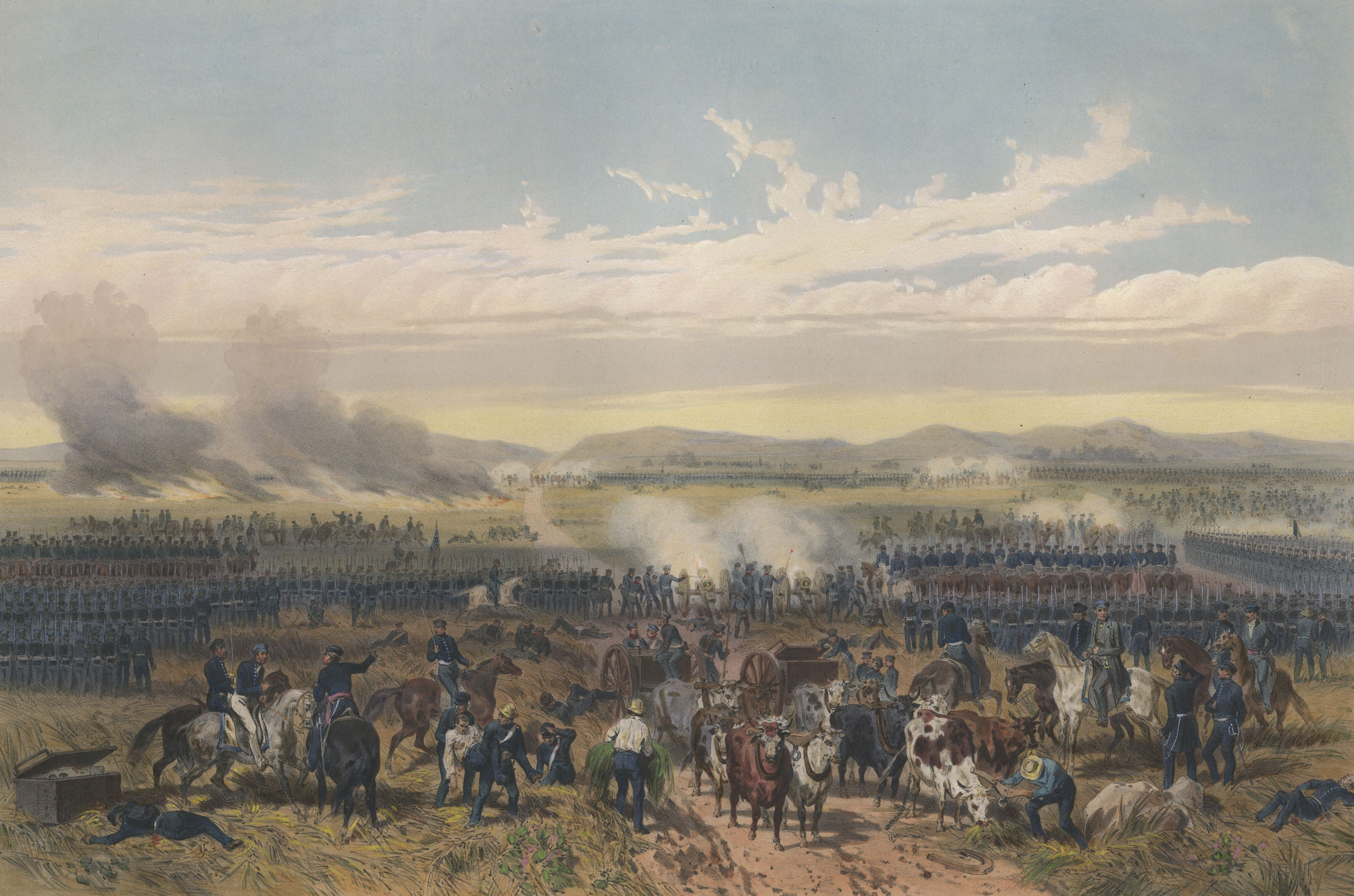
The Battle of Palo Alto was fought on May 8, 1846

On April 25, 1846, Captain Seth B. Thornton received reports of Mexican troops crossing the Rio Grande. Thornton and 63 U.S. dragoons moved to Rancho de Carricitos and discovered several houses in the area. Mexican General Anastasio Torrejón crossed the Rio Grande the previous day. He commanded 1,600 cavalry and infantry troops to surround Thornton's troops in fractions. Due to heavy force from Torrejón's troops, Thornton's troops surrendered. Eleven American casualties were reported; 45 troops and Thornton were held as prisoners. Reports of the incident were sent to President James K. Polk, who announced, "American blood has been spilled upon the American territory." On May 13, the United States Congress declared war against Mexico.

American General Zachary Taylor retreated from Fort Texas on May 1, 1846; Mexican General Mariano Arista began preparing artillery and troops from across the Rio Grande. On May 3, Arista and the Mexican Army began the siege of Fort Texas, during the first active campaign in the Mexican–American War. This was counteracted by the United States 7th Infantry Regiment. Despite heavy strikes, Mexican General Pedro de Ampudia outlined a traditional siege to move forward. Taylor was notified of the incident and began moving towards Fort Texas. Mexican troops intercepted them near Palo Alto, about 5 mi (8.0 km) north of present-day Brownsville, resulting in the first battle of the war.

The following day, Mexican troops had retreated. Taylor's troops charged up to them, resulting in the Battle of Resaca de la Palma, which took place within the present limits. When Taylor arrived at the besieged Fort Texas, he found that two soldiers, including the fort's commander, Major Jacob Brown, had died. Brown, who suffered an injury when a cannonball hit his leg, died three days after his injury on May 9. In his honor, General Taylor renamed the facility as Fort Brown. An old cannon at the University of Texas at Brownsville and Texas Southmost College marks the spot where Major Brown received his fatal wound.

On July 13, 1859, Juan Cortina saw Brownsville city Marshal Robert Sheers arrest and beat an elderly man who had been a ranch hand at his mother's ranch. Cortina approached the marshal, questioning his motives, before shooting him twice after he refused to release the man. The first shot reportedly missed Sheers, but the second struck his shoulder, causing him to fall to the ground. Cortina and the elderly man rode off on a horse. The following year, Cortina returned with troops, executing four Anglo men and simultaneously releasing several Mexican prisoners. He then issued a proclamation explaining his reasons for the attack.

=== Civil War ===
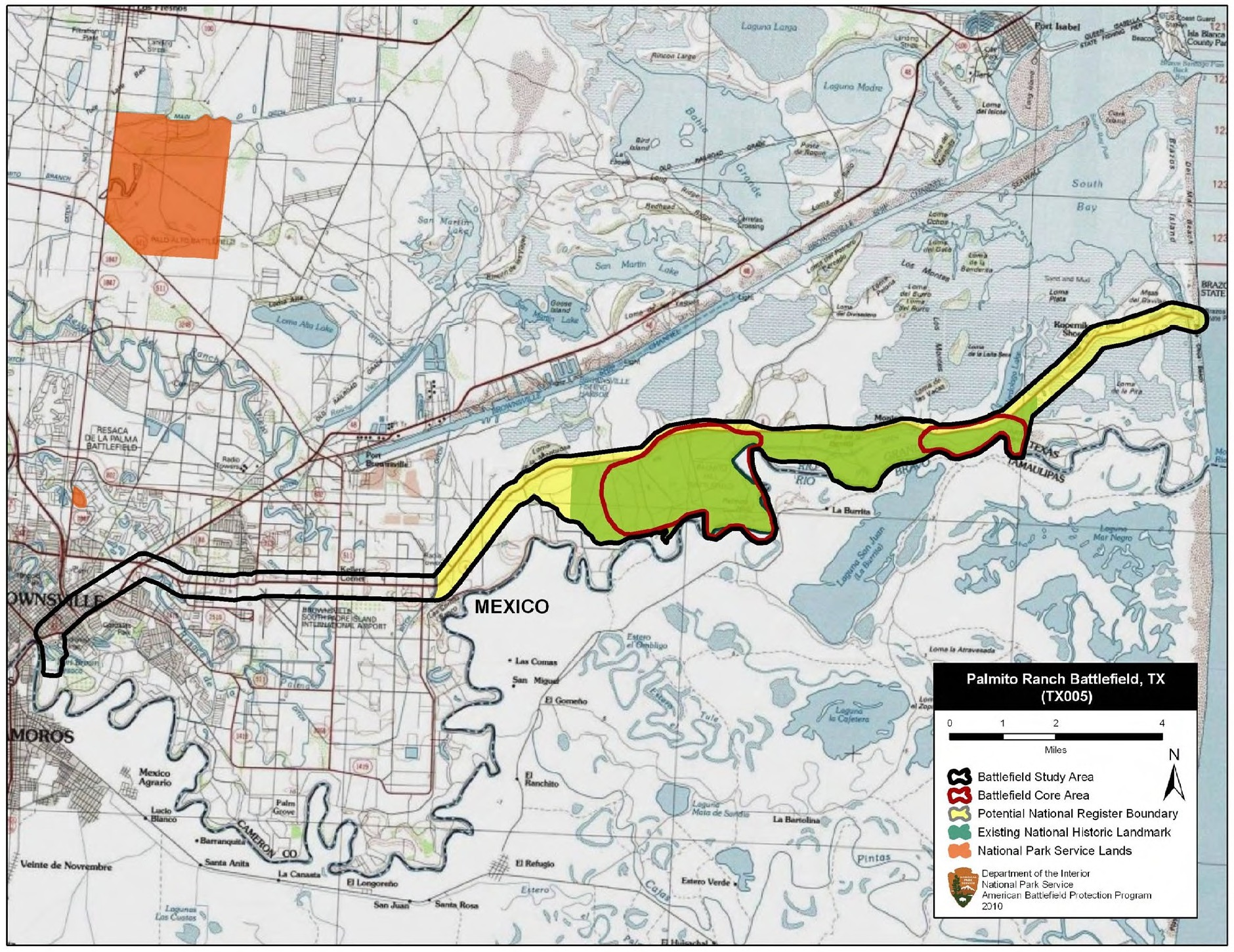
Map showcasing the location of the Battle of Palmito Ranch

During the American Civil War, Brownsville served as a smuggling point for Confederate goods into Mexico. Most significantly, cotton was smuggled to European ships through the Mexican port of Bagdad to avoid Union blockades. The city was located at the end of the "Cotton Road", southwest of the Cotton Belt. In November 1863, Union troops landed at Port Isabel and marched towards Brownsville to take control of Fort Brown. In the ensuing Battle of Brownsville, Confederate forces abandoned the fort, blowing it up with 8,000 lb (3,600 kg) of explosives. In 1864, Confederate forces commanded by Colonel John Salmon Ford reoccupied the town, and he became mayor of Brownsville.

Robert E. Lee and his Confederate army surrendered to Union commander Ulysses S. Grant on April 9, 1865, signing a hand-written document at the Appomattox Court House, effectively ending the American Civil War. Theodore Barrett was ordered to move 500 62nd Regiment troops of colors towards Brazos Island. On May 11, Barrett's troops moved inland towards Brownsville and spotted Confederate soldiers. John Salmon Ford received news of this and prepared to attack. On May 15, 1865, 34 days after the signing of the surrender, the Battle of Palmito Ranch took place. Confederates killed or wounded around 30 opponents and captured more than 100 other troops. This is accepted by some historians as the last battle of the American Civil War. President Grant sent Union General Frederick Steele to Brownsville to patrol the United States–Mexico border after the Civil War to aid the Juaristas with military supplies.

=== 20th century ===
Texas, like other Southern states, passed a new constitution and Jim Crow laws that established racial segregation and disenfranchised African Americans at the turn of the 20th century, generally by raising barriers to voter registration. While Hispanic residents were considered white under the terms of the United States annexation of Texas, legislatures found ways to suppress their participation in politics.

==== 1906 Brownsville affair and Black soldiers ====
On August 13 and 14, 1906, Brownsville was the site of the Brownsville affair. Racial tensions were increasing between white townsfolk and black infantrymen who were stationed at Fort Brown. On the night of August 13, one white bartender was killed, and a white police officer was wounded by rifle shots in the street. Townsfolk, including the mayor, accused the infantrymen of the murders. Without affording them a chance to defend themselves in a hearing, President Theodore Roosevelt dishonorably discharged the entire 167-member regiment due to their alleged "conspiracy of silence". Investigations in the 1970s revealed that the soldiers were not responsible for the attacks, and the Nixon Administration reversed all dishonorable discharges. Fort Brown was decommissioned after the end of World War II in 1945. In 1948, the city and college acquired the land.

==== Public health ====
In the spring of 1991, a cluster of anencephaly cases in the area made national headlines, prompting a public health investigation. A high anencephaly rate, of 19.7 per 10,000 live births, was found. Additionally, it was discovered that other neural tube defects, including spina bifida and encephalocele, had been an ongoing, undetected issue in pregnant Mexican-American women for years in the area. Subsequently, multiple risk factors were found, such as folate deficiency, and that increasing dietary folate intake had a protective effect.

=== 21st century ===
Brownsville has received significant media attention surrounding immigration policies and border-wall funding costs. In 2006, President George W. Bush signed into law the Secure Fence Act of 2006. The act administered the construction of a tall border "fence" extending from the Pacific Ocean (at San Diego and Tijuana's border crossing), through the entry of the Port of Brownsville. In 2008, the United States Department of Homeland Security issued a proposal to add 70 mi (110 km) of border fence, an action which would potentially reallocate portions of the University of Texas at Brownsville campus. The proposal would have transferred 180 acres (73 ha) of university land, including several historical monuments and the university's golf course, to Mexico. The proposal was altered after Andrew Hanen, a federal district judge, rejected the department's idea.

==== Border wall issue ====
In 2016, Republican presidential candidate Donald Trump proposed building a border wall along the United States-Mexico border. Trump's proposed wall, if completed, would consist of 2,000 mi (3,200 km) "of hardened concrete, and ... rebar, and steel" across the southern border, including Brownsville. On January 25, 2017, days after assuming office, Trump issued Executive Order 13767, directing construction for the border wall. Brownsville was also the center of controversy surrounding the new administration's continuation of an Obama-era policy of housing immigrant children separate from adults (except for mothers) who entered the country unlawfully. The issue surrounded Casa Padre, the largest juvenile immigration detention center in America, which is located within Brownsville's city limits.

==== Revitalization ====
Downtown Brownsville has received several revitalization projects from the city government to increase tourism and safety. The Texas Historical Commission named Brownsville as part of its Main Street Program in 2016. Several historic buildings were restored, including the Stegman Building, a historic building named after Baldwin G. Stegman, one of the city's first streetcar line developers. The Environmental Protection Agency (EPA) selected Brownsville as one of six cities for their "Greening America's Communities" program. The agency worked on a revitalization project for Market Square, a building constructed in 1850. The city also received a $3.4 million grant from the Façade Improvement Program for this project.

== Geography and climate ==
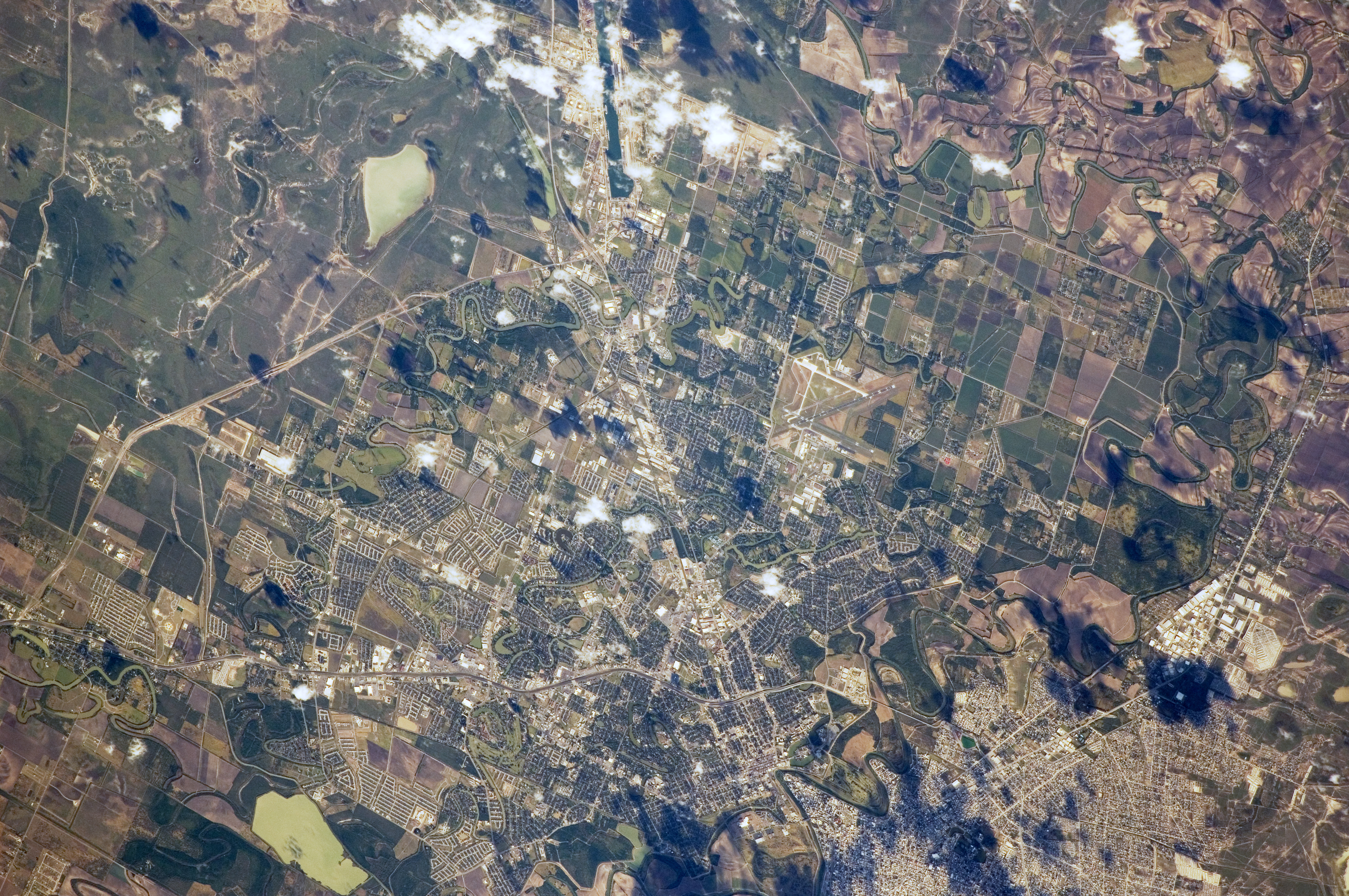
View from the International Space Station, with the photo centered on east Brownsville

Brownsville is one of the southernmost cities in the contiguous United States; only a handful of municipalities in Florida's Miami-Dade and Monroe Counties (plus Everglades City, Collier County) are located farther south than Brownsville. The city has a total area of 84.867 sq mi (220 km^{2}), of which 81.528 sq mi (211 km^{2}) are land and 3.339 sq mi (9 km^{2}) are water, according to the United States Census Bureau of 2017.

Brownsville is situated at the intersection of several different climates zones, such as the subtropics, the Chihuahuan Desert, the Gulf Coastal Plain, and the southern reach of the American Great Plains, thus attracting high numbers of migratory birds, and creating a unique biome for many species of plants and animals. Its idiosyncratic network of resacas (English: oxbow lakes), distributaries of the Rio Grande, provide habitat for numerous nesting and breeding birds, typically during the spring and fall migrations. Brownsville's vegetation is classified as grassland.

=== Metropolitan area ===
Brownsville is in one metropolitan statistical area as defined by the United States Census Bureau. The Brownsville–Harlingen–Raymondville combined statistical area consists of Cameron County and Willacy County. It includes the Brownsville metropolitan area and the micropolitan area of Raymondville. The city of Raymondville is the county seat of Willacy County. The Brownsville-Harlingen-Raymondville combined statistical area is home to 445,309 people (2017 estimated), making it the 106th-largest combined statistical area in the United States. Based on the Uniform Crime Report conducted by the Federal Bureau of Investigation in 2013, the Brownsville metropolitan area ranked last on its list of the "Most Dangerous Cities" in Texas, with "240 incidents of violent crime per 100,000 people" and a murder rate of 1.4. Robbery crimes make up 25% of overall crime in the city, with a rate of 58.1 per 100,000 residents.

In 2011, Brownsville became one of the first cities in the United States to require stores to charge a fee for single-use plastic shopping bags. The ordinance was enacted to reduce pollution and litter around the city. The city repealed the ordinance in 2018 after it was ruled illegal by the Supreme Court of Texas. Forbes identified Brownsville as one of 12 metropolitan areas in the United States with the cleanest air. In 2018, the Brownsville–Harlingen area was among the "Cleanest U.S. Cities for Ozone Air Pollution" in the American Lung Association's "State of the Air" in 2018.

=== Flora and soil ===
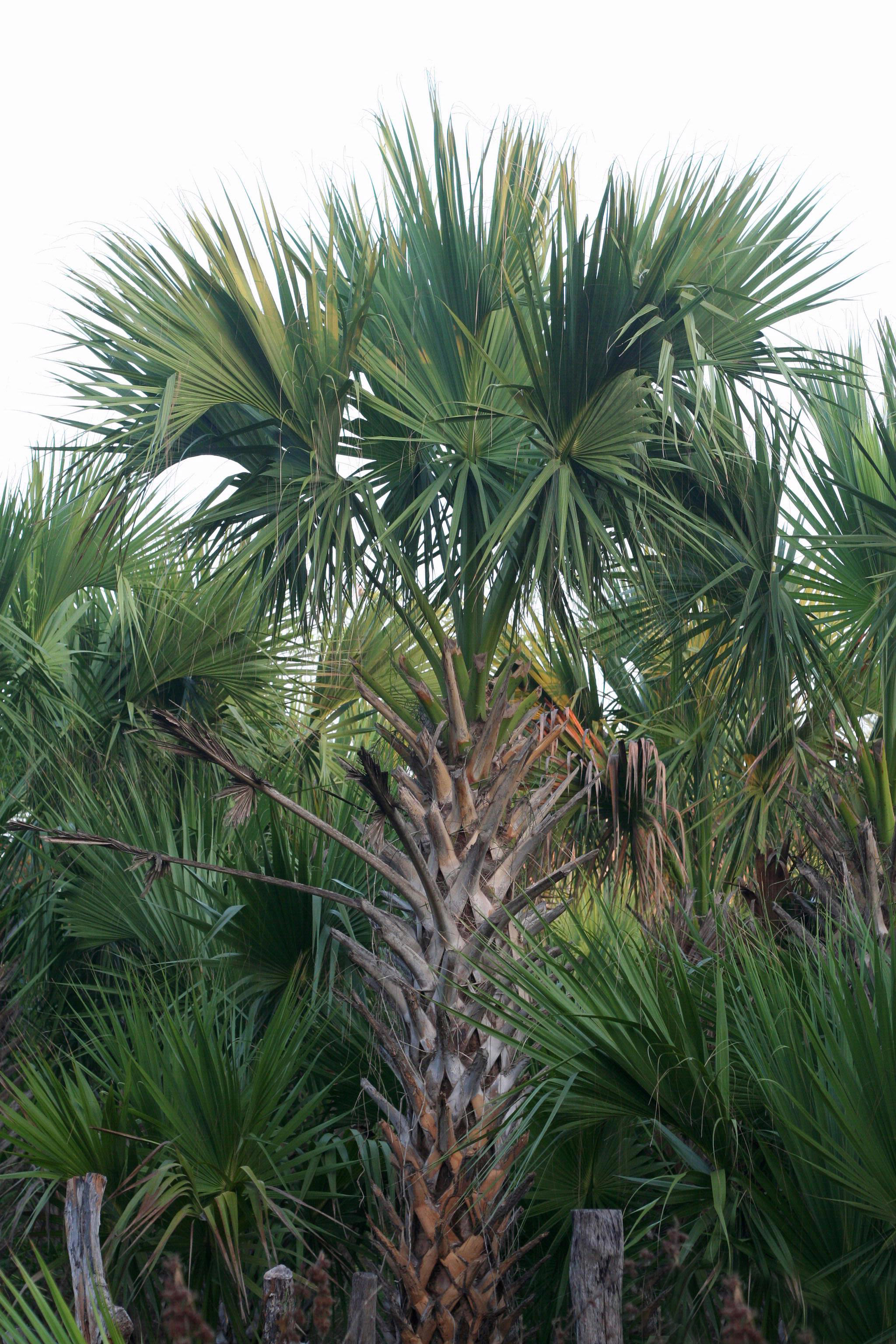
The Sabal mexicana (Texas sabal palm) is a native plant species in Brownsville.

Broadleaf evergreen plants, including palms, dominate Brownsville neighborhoods to a greater degree than other locations in Texas, including nearby cities such as Harlingen and McAllen. Brownsville is home to the Sabal mexicana, the only species of palmetto palm native to Texas with a significant trunk (Sabal minor, also native to Texas, is nearly trunkless). Though it used to cover a large portion of the land next to the Rio Grande, the city contains one of the last native stands of S. mexicana. Citharexylum berlandieri (Tamaulipan fiddlewood), Rivina humilis (pigeonberry), and Leucophyllum frutescens (Texas sage) are also native flora.

Soils are mostly of clay to silty clay loam texture, moderately alkaline (pH 8.2) to strongly alkaline (pH 8.5) and with a significant degree of salinity in many places; other types of soils present around the city include Cameron clay and sporadic amounts of Laredo silt loam. Due to Brownsville's proximity to the coast, Lomalta clay is common around the swamp areas of the vicinity. Several parts of the city have a high risk of localized flooding because of flat topography, ubiquitous low-permeability clay soils, and inadequate infrastructure funding.

According to the United States Geological Survey, Brownsville's soils are primarily alluvium and windblown deposits. The majority of the city's soil is made of floodplain deposits from the Rio Grande; it consists of clay, sand, silt, gravel, and organic matter. Windblown deposits are made up of "active dunes and dune complexes" that contain mostly clay and silt near the coastal region and combination of clay, sand, and silt inland.

=== Climate ===
Brownsville has a humid subtropical climate (Köppen Cfa). Winters are warm, and summers are hot and humid. Due to its location on the Gulf Coast about 2.49° north of the Tropic of Cancer, the climate closely borders a tropical savanna climate (Köppen Aw), while its proximity to the deserts of Chihuahua and the Gulf Coastal Plain, Brownsville's geographic location lies near the boundary of a hot semi-arid climate (BSh). Snow is a very rare event in Brownsville. Its wet season is concentrated during the late summer and early fall, peaking in September, when the threat from tropical cyclones is greatest. In most years, November through April is the dry season. As such, Brownsville receives modest annual rainfall, averaging about 26.78 inches or 680 millimeters annually based on records between 1991 and 2020, although extreme calendar year totals have ranged from 11.59 inches or 294.4 millimeters in 1953 to 60.06 inches or 1,525.5 millimeters in 1886. September 1886 saw as much as 30.57 inches or 776.5 millimeters of rain including 24.26 inches or 616.2 millimeters in three days from the 20th to the 22nd, whereas only 0.21 inches or 5.3 millimeters fell in four months from February to May 2011, and only 1.26 inches or 32.0 millimeters in six months from November 1951 to April 1952.

The monthly daily average temperature ranges from 62.9 °F (17.2 °C) in January to 87 °F (30.6 °C) in August. Heat waves during the summer cause an average of 141 afternoons of high temperatures over 90 °F (32.2 °C) but fewer than five of temperatures above 100 °F (37.8 °C). The city is located along the boundary of USDA hardiness zones 9b and 10a. The hottest temperature on record in Brownsville occurred on March 27, 1984, and August 28, 2023, when the city reached 106 °F (41.1 °C). On the other extreme, freezing temperatures occur once or twice a year typically. On December 25, 2004, Brownsville recorded its first instance of measurable snow in 109 years with 1.5 inches or 0.038 meters, and the first recorded White Christmas. Brownsville's lowest temperature on record occurred on February 13, 1899, when the city reached 12 °F (−11.1 °C). Based on 30-year averages obtained from the National Oceanic and Atmospheric Administration's National Climatic Data Center weather records, 24/7 Wall St. ranked Brownsville the fifth-hottest city in America in 2016.

Climate data for Brownsville/South Padre Island International Airport, Texas (1991−2020 normals, (Note: Mean monthly maxima and minima (i.e. the expected highest and lowest temperature readings at any point during the year or given month) calculated based on data at said location from 1991 to 2020.) extremes 1878−present)
Month	Jan	Feb	Mar	Apr	May	Jun	Jul	Aug	Sep	Oct	Nov	Dec	Year
Record high °F (°C)	95 (35)	94 (34)	106 (41)	104 (40)	104 (40)	104 (40)	104 (40)	106 (41)	105 (41)	99 (37)	98 (37)	94 (34)	106 (41)
Mean maximum °F (°C)	83.9 (28.8)	87.1 (30.6)	91.4 (33.0)	94.8 (34.9)	95.3 (35.2)	97.2 (36.2)	98.0 (36.7)	99.1 (37.3)	97.2 (36.2)	93.1 (33.9)	88.7 (31.5)	85.3 (29.6)	100.7 (38.2)
Mean daily maximum °F (°C)	72.6 (22.6)	76.2 (24.6)	80.6 (27.0)	85.7 (29.8)	90.3 (32.4)	94.0 (34.4)	95.0 (35.0)	96.3 (35.7)	92.2 (33.4)	87.3 (30.7)	80.3 (26.8)	74.2 (23.4)	85.4 (29.7)
Daily mean °F (°C)	62.9 (17.2)	66.5 (19.2)	71.3 (21.8)	76.7 (24.8)	82.0 (27.8)	85.6 (29.8)	86.4 (30.2)	87.0 (30.6)	83.4 (28.6)	77.9 (25.5)	70.5 (21.4)	64.4 (18.0)	76.2 (24.6)
Mean daily minimum °F (°C)	53.1 (11.7)	56.9 (13.8)	62.0 (16.7)	67.7 (19.8)	73.7 (23.2)	77.2 (25.1)	77.8 (25.4)	77.8 (25.4)	74.7 (23.7)	68.6 (20.3)	60.8 (16.0)	54.7 (12.6)	67.1 (19.5)
Mean minimum °F (°C)	36.4 (2.4)	40.1 (4.5)	43.8 (6.6)	50.9 (10.5)	60.9 (16.1)	70.4 (21.3)	72.8 (22.7)	72.7 (22.6)	64.7 (18.2)	51.9 (11.1)	42.5 (5.8)	36.5 (2.5)	33.7 (0.9)
Record low °F (°C)	18 (−8)	12 (−11)	28 (−2)	37 (3)	41 (5)	56 (13)	58 (14)	63 (17)	51 (11)	35 (2)	27 (−3)	16 (−9)	12 (−11)
Average precipitation inches (mm)	1.08 (27)	1.03 (26)	1.45 (37)	1.47 (37)	2.22 (56)	2.86 (73)	1.98 (50)	2.16 (55)	5.73 (146)	3.83 (97)	1.76 (45)	1.21 (31)	26.78 (680)
Average snowfall inches (cm)	0.0 (0.0)	0.0 (0.0)	0.0 (0.0)	0.0 (0.0)	0.0 (0.0)	0.0 (0.0)	0.0 (0.0)	0.0 (0.0)	0.0 (0.0)	0.0 (0.0)	0.0 (0.0)	0.1 (0.25)	0.1 (0.25)
Average precipitation days (≥ 0.01 in)	7.0	5.3	5.3	4.5	4.8	5.8	4.8	6.1	11.1	7.6	7.0	7.5	76.8
Average snowy days (≥ 0.1 inch)	0.0	0.0	0.0	0.0	0.0	0.0	0.0	0.0	0.0	0.0	0.0	0.1	0.1
Average relative humidity (%)	79.3	77.4	74.6	75.1	76.5	75.0	73.2	73.8	76.3	75.3	76.1	78.2	75.9
Average dew point °F (°C)	51.4 (10.8)	53.4 (11.9)	58.6 (14.8)	64.9 (18.3)	70.2 (21.2)	72.7 (22.6)	73.0 (22.8)	73.2 (22.9)	71.8 (22.1)	65.7 (18.7)	59.5 (15.3)	53.8 (12.1)	64.0 (17.8)
Mean monthly sunshine hours	130.6	151.3	206.8	232.7	266.4	306.5	334.4	306.4	252.0	228.3	166.2	130.7	2,712.3
Percentage possible sunshine	39	48	56	61	64	74	79	76	68	64	51	40	61
Source: NOAA (relative humidity, dew point and sun 1961−1990)

== Demographics ==
Historical population
Census	Pop.	Note	%±
1850	519		—
1860	2,734		426.8%
1870	4,905		79.4%
1880	4,938		0.7%
1890	6,134		24.2%
1900	6,305		2.8%
1910	10,517		66.8%
1920	11,791		12.1%
1930	22,021		86.8%
1940	22,083		0.3%
1950	35,086		58.9%
1960	48,040		36.9%
1970	52,522		9.3%
1980	84,997		61.8%
1990	98,962		16.4%
2000	139,722		41.2%
2010	175,023		25.3%
2020	186,738		6.7%
U.S. Decennial Census; 1850–1900 1910; 1920 1930 1940; 1950 1960 1970; 1980 1990 2000; 2010

Brownsville is the 18th-most populous city in Texas. It ranks as one of the top U.S. cities in terms of the percentage of Hispanic residents. According to the Pew Research Center, its metropolitan area holds the 26th-largest Hispanic population with roughly 373,000 (88.7%) sharing this distinction. Of that percentage, 96.7% are Mexican and 0.8% are Puerto Rican.

=== Racial and ethnic composition ===
Brownsville city, Texas – Racial and ethnic composition Note: the US Census treats Hispanic/Latino as an ethnic category. This table excludes Latinos from the racial categories and assigns them to a separate category. Hispanics/Latinos may be of any race.
Race / Ethnicity (NH = Non-Hispanic)	Pop 2000	Pop 2010	Pop 2020	% 2000	% 2010	% 2020
White alone (NH)	10,826	10,027	8,968	7.75%	5.73%	4.80%
Black or African American alone (NH)	276	332	414	0.20%	0.19%	0.22%
Native American or Alaska Native alone (NH)	77	120	85	0.06%	0.07%	0.05%
Asian alone (NH)	710	1,091	1,057	0.51%	0.62%	0.57%
Pacific Islander alone (NH)	9	24	24	0.01%	0.01%	0.01%
Some Other Race alone (NH)	36	72	336	0.03%	0.04%	0.18%
Mixed race or Multiracial (NH)	253	248	544	0.18%	0.14%	0.29%
Hispanic or Latino (any race)	127,535	163,109	175,310	91.28%	93.19%	93.88%
Total	139,722	175,023	186,738	100.00%	100.00%	100.00%

=== 2020 census ===
As of the 2020 census, Brownsville had a population of 186,738. The median age was 32.9 years. 28.8% of residents were under the age of 18 and 13.3% of residents were 65 years of age or older. For every 100 females there were 91.6 males, and for every 100 females age 18 and over there were 86.8 males age 18 and over.

97.8% of residents lived in urban areas, while 2.2% lived in rural areas.

There were 57,460 households in Brownsville, of which 45.0% had children under the age of 18 living in them. Of all households, 49.0% were married-couple households, 14.4% were households with a male householder and no spouse or partner present, and 31.7% were households with a female householder and no spouse or partner present. About 18.3% of all households were made up of individuals and 8.7% had someone living alone who was 65 years of age or older.

There were 63,191 housing units, of which 9.1% were vacant. Among occupied housing units, 60.1% were owner-occupied and 39.9% were renter-occupied. The homeowner vacancy rate was 1.2% and the rental vacancy rate was 7.5%. The ancestry of Brownsville was 0.9% German, 0.6% English, 0.5 Irish, 0.4% French, 0.4% Italian, and 0.2% Dutch.

Approximately 25.9% of the population were foreign born, with 35.7% of those being U.S. citizens and 64.3% of those not U.S. citizens. The median household income was $47,435, with families having $50,127, married couples having $59,604, and non-families had $18,322. A total of 22.0% of the population were in poverty, with 36.4% of people under 18, 21.2% of people between the ages of 18 and 64, and 28.2% of people 65 or older were in poverty.

=== 2010 census ===
As of the census of 2010, 175,023 people, 49,871 households, and 41,047 families were residing in the city. The population density was 1,207.1 people/sq mi (466.0/km^{2}). The 53,936 housing units averaged 372.0/sq mi (143.6/km^{2}). The racial makeup of the city was 88% White, 0.4% African American, 0.4% Native American, 0.7% Asian, 9.1% from other races, and 1.5% from two or more races. Hispanics or Latinos of any race were 93.2% of the population.

Of the 38,174 households, 50.1% had children under 18 living with them, 59.3% were married couples living together, 20.9% had a female householder with no husband present, 5.3% had a male householder with no wife present, and 15.7% were not families. About 13.7% of all households were made up of individuals, and 6.7% had someone living alone who was 65 or older. The average household size was 3.62, and the average family size was 3.99.

In the city, the age distribution was 34.6% under 18, 11.2% from 18 to 24, 27.5% from 25 to 44, 17.2% from 45 to 64, and 9.5% who were 65 or older. The median age was 28 years. For every 100 females, there were 89.0 males. For every 100 females age 18 and over, there were 82.5 males.

=== Income and employment ===
Despite a fast-growing economy, Brownsville has one of the highest poverty rates in the nation. The median income for a household in the city was $24,468, and the median income for a family was $26,186. Males had a median income of $21,739 versus $17,116 for females. The per capita income for the city is $9,762. It is frequently cited as having the highest percentage of residents in the nation below the federal poverty level. About 31.6% of families and 35.7% of the population were below the federal poverty line, including 48.4% of those under 18 and 31.5% of those 65 or over.

Based on data collected from the United States Census Bureau's American Community Survey, the Brownsville metropolitan area ranked as the second-poorest urban area in the country, behind the McAllen metropolitan area. In 2017, the city's unemployment rate was 6.2% with 18.1% adults holding a bachelor's degree. It reported a 5.8% jobless rate the following year. Despite high unemployment rates, the urban area is also one of the fastest growing in the United States.

== Economy ==
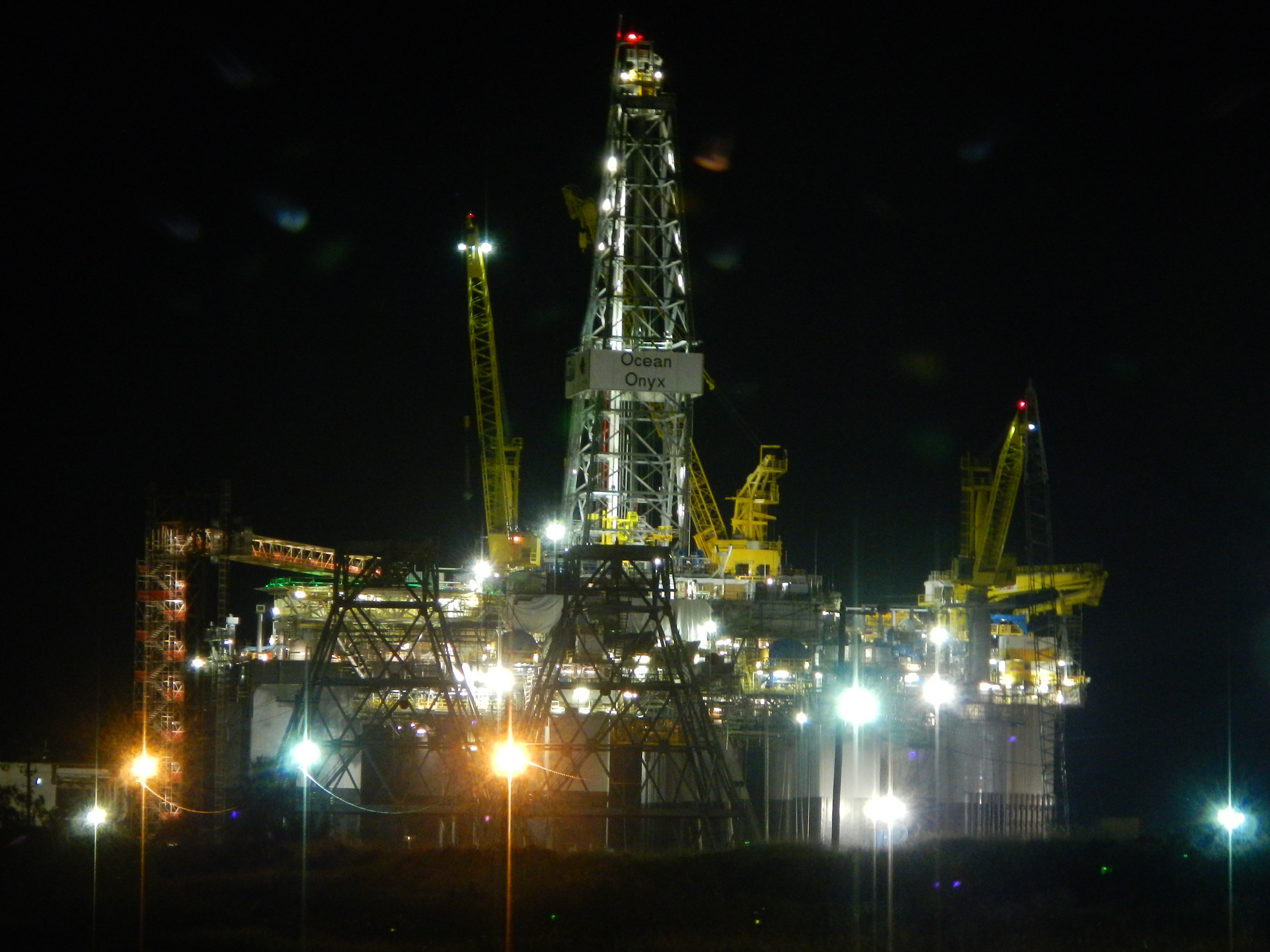
The Port of Brownsville constructed the Ocean Onyx deepwater rig in 2013

Brownsville's economic activity is derived from the service and manufacturing industries. Government and the University of Texas Rio Grande Valley are both large contributors to the local economy. Other prominent industries in Brownsville include education and aerospace and space transportation. During the first decade of the 1900s, the city's population increased after a boom in the agriculture industry. Brownsville's subtropical climate has made it a commercial hub for the citrus industry.

The Port of Brownsville produces significant revenue for the city of Brownsville. The port, located 2 mi (3.2 km) from the city, provides a link between the road networks of nearby Mexico and the Gulf Intracoastal Waterway of Texas. The port has become an important economic hub for South Texas, where shipments arrive from other parts of the United States, Mexico, and other foreign countries. The port also participates in ship recycling; it has five of the country's eight ship-recycling companies. It received a $1.8 million grant from the United States Department of Commerce to support business and infrastructure development. The grant is expected to create 700 jobs and generate $3 million in private investments.

=== International trade ===
Brownsville's economy is based mainly on its international trade with Mexico under the North American Free Trade Agreement (NAFTA). Due to Matamoros' maquiladora (English: textile factory) boom, Brownsville experienced growth in the air cargo industry during the late 1980s. It is home to one of the fastest-growing manufacturing sectors in the United States. Brownsville has been recognized as having one of the best pro-business climates in the United States, and the city has been ranked among the least-expensive places to live in the country. President Barack Obama signed a bill in 2016 allowing for the deepening of the Brownsville Ship Channel from 42 ft (13 m) to 52 ft (16 m).

=== Sports ===
The Sams Memorial Stadium is located in Brownsville. It has a capacity of 10,000 and opened in 1957. The stadium is used mostly for American football and soccer.

FC Brownsville is a soccer team that formed in 2015 and joined the National Premier Soccer League in 2018. The club currently uses the Brownsville Sports Park for home matches. In 2023, FC Brownsville won the NPSL Lone Star Conference, defeating the Lubbock Matadors 1–0 in the conferences' championship.

=== Technology ===
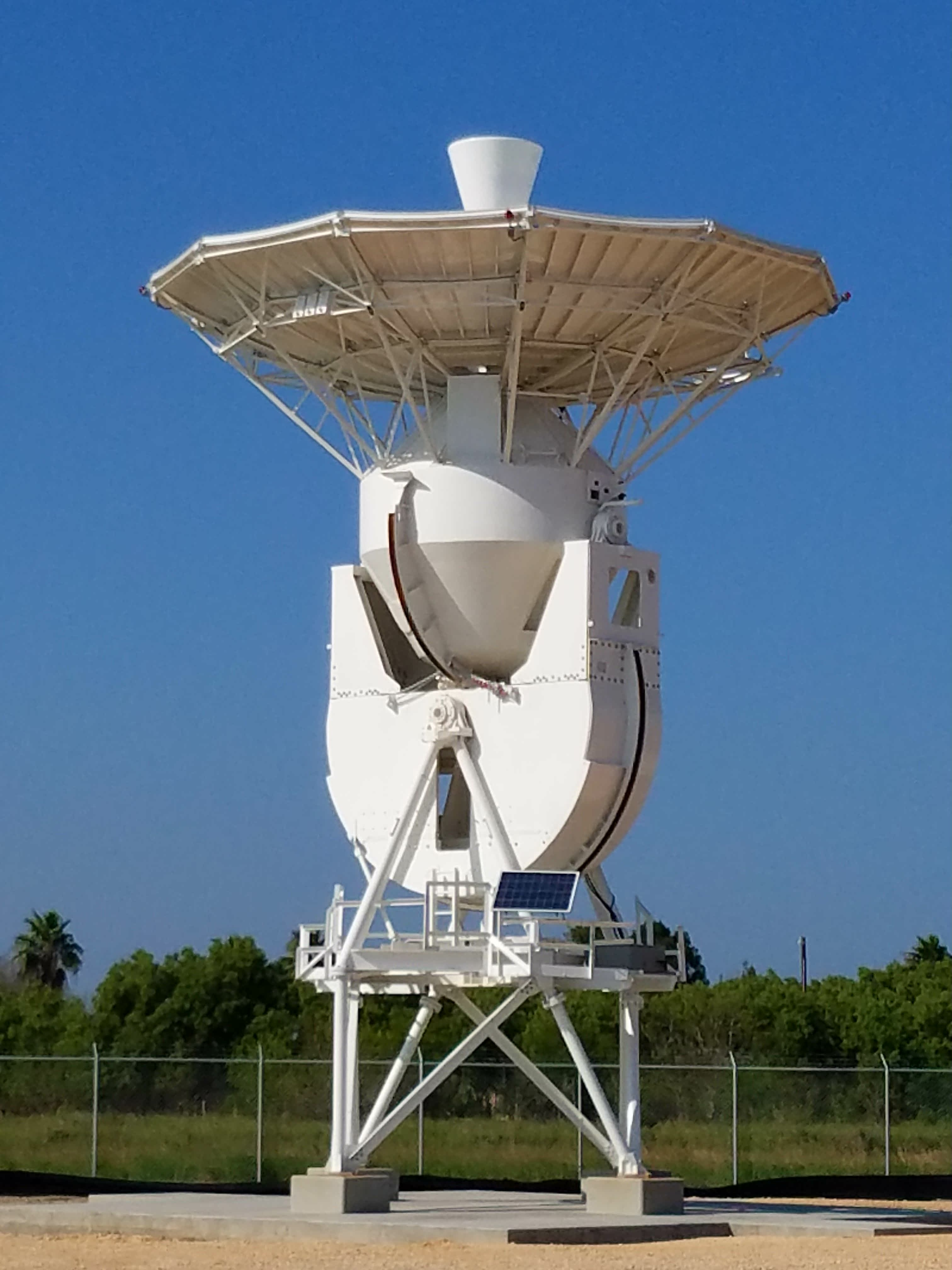
A tracking station antenna (pictured) installed at SpaceX Starbase

Entrepreneur Elon Musk announced the construction of the SpaceX South Texas launch site (now Starbase), a spaceport for private spaceflight east of Brownsville, on the Gulf Coast, in 2014. The launch facility is estimated to produce US$85 million for the city of Brownsville and generate approximately US$51 million in annual salaries from the roughly 500 jobs to be created (by 2024). The facility, itself, was projected to employ 75–100 full-time workers in its first years of operation, with up to 150 full-time employees/contractors by 2019. Musk further helped to fund a revitalization of downtown Brownsville, with new restaurants and bars.

As of October 2014, the University of Texas at Brownsville and the Brownsville Economic Development Council (BEDC), in collaboration with SpaceX, are building radio-frequency (RF) technology facilities for STARGATE (Spacecraft Tracking and Astronomical Research into Gigahertz Astrophysical Transient Emission). The facility is intended to provide students and faculty access to radio frequency technologies used in spaceflight operations, and will include satellite and spacecraft tracking.

SpaceX's presence caused the median price for a home in the area to spike, increasing to $239,000 in April 2022, almost $100,000 higher than three years prior. BEDC purchased five lots in Starbase, totaling 2.3 acres (0.93 ha) near the SpaceX launch site, and renamed it as the "Stargate" subdivision. The beach location will include a 12,000 ft^{2} (1,100 m^{2}) tracking center. Stargate received several startup grants including US$1.2 million from the United States Economic Development Administration.

=== Principal employers ===
According to the BEDC, the top employers in the city as of May 2015 were:

#	Employer	Employees
1	Brownsville Independent School District	7,670
2	Cameron County	1,950
3	University of Texas Rio Grande Valley	1,734
4	Keppel AmFELS	1,650
5	Walmart	1,413
6	Abundant Life Home Health	1,300
7	City of Brownsville	1,227
8	Caring For You Home Health	1,200
9	H-E-B Grocery	975
10	Maximus	950

== Parks and recreation ==
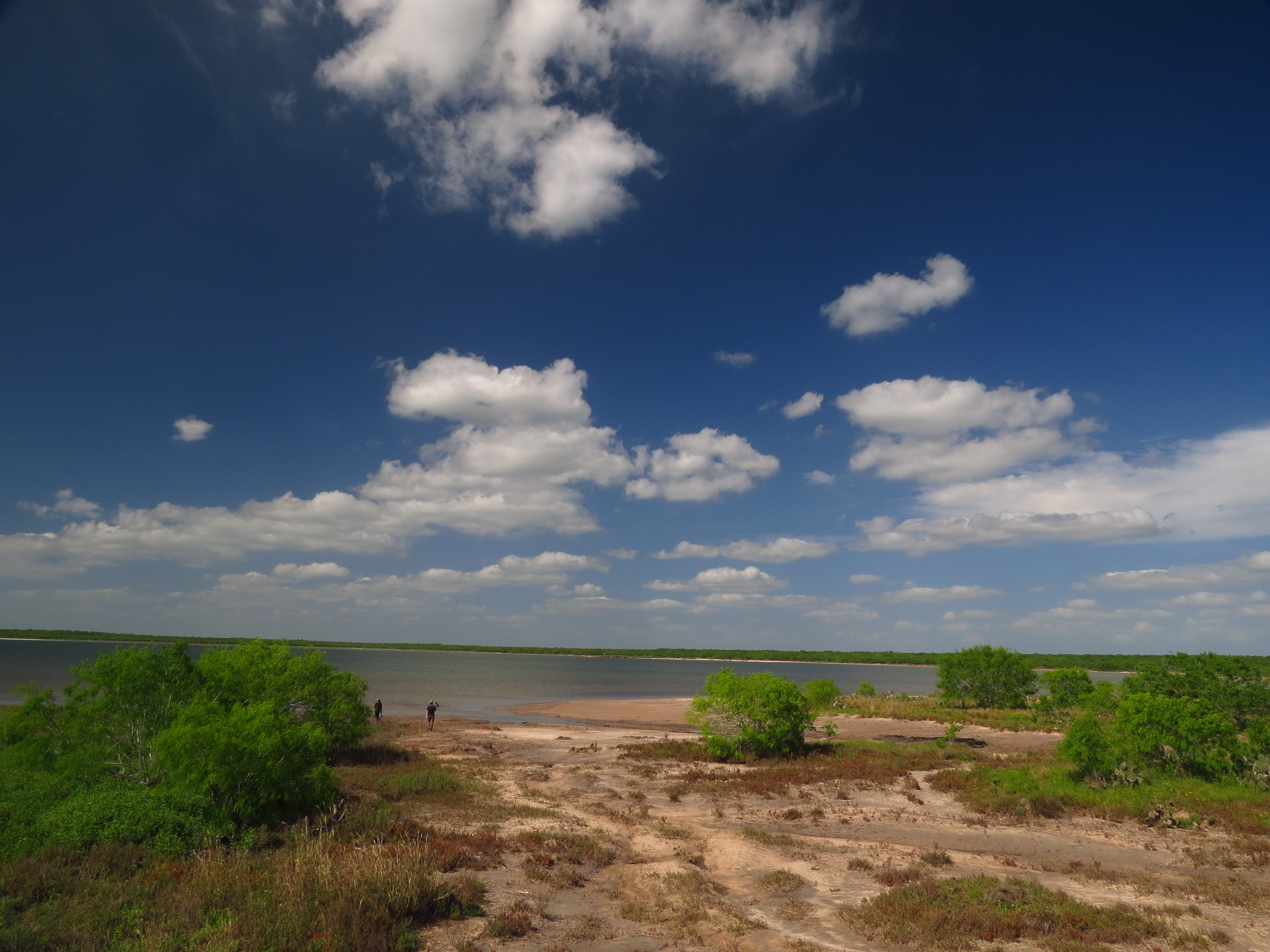
El Sal Del Rey inside the Lower Rio Grande Valley National Wildlife Refuge

Brownsville has 37 parks connected by a 1,200-acre (1.9 sq mi) system of parkland and 32 mi (51 km) of bike lanes. The city also has three gymnasiums, two public pools, and 55 athletic fields.

Brownsville's proximity to the coast has allowed the city to register several locations under the list of protected areas of the United States. Resaca de la Palma State Park is one of six nature preserves (and three state parks) that are part of the World Birding Center. It is also the largest nature preserve of the park system, with approximately 1,200 acres (490 ha) of native semitropical brushland. The area was part of the Battle of Resaca de la Palma. The National Park Service lists the site of the Battle of Palo Alto as a National Historic Park. The agency purchased 300 acres (120 ha) of the site's land, with two-thirds belonging to private landowners. It is native to the Prosopis glandulosa (honey mesquite) bush, Opuntia engelmannii (prickly pear), and Yucca treculeana (yucca).

The city encompasses two national wildlife refuges. Located in northeast Cameron County, Laguna Atascosa National Wildlife Refuge protects several endangered species, including the Texas ocelot (Leopardus pardalis albescens), a rare wild cat, and the Aplomado falcon (Falco femoralis). The refuge measures 65,096-acre (263.43 km^{2}). The Lower Rio Grande Valley National Wildlife Refuge is located in northwest Cameron County and measures 90,788-acre (36,741 ha). The refuge contains trails that are connected to the Great Texas Coastal Birding Trail. The Boca Chica State Park and Brazos Island State Park are state parks that were transferred by separate lease agreements to the Lower Rio Grande Valley refuge center in 2007. They measure 10,680-acre (43.2 km^{2}) and 217-acre (0.88 km^{2}), respectively. Laguna Madre is located on the eastern side of the county. It is a long, shallow, hypersaline lagoon, and is one of the most protected lagoon ecosystems in the United States.

== Government ==
Brownsville has a council–manager government. The mayor and a six-member city commission are selected in nonpartisan elections. Four members are elected from geographic districts; the remaining two members are elected at-large. Since Brownsville is the county seat of Cameron County, many county offices are in Brownsville. The city's public library system has two branches. The primary law enforcement agency for the city is the Brownsville Police Department. The Brownsville Fire Department has nine stations around the city; its central office is located on the eastern side of the city.

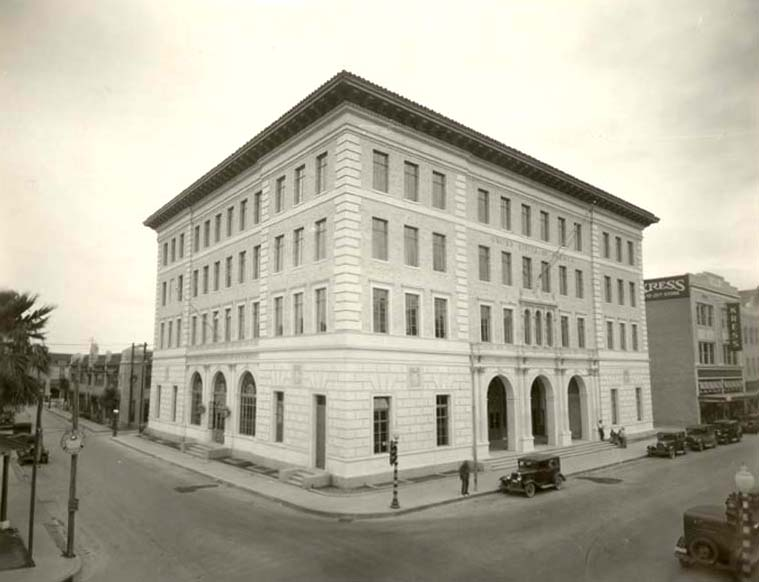
The Old Federal Courthouse; it currently serves as Brownsville's City Hall

Most of Brownsville is represented by two county commissioners of the five-member Commissioners' Court (one member, the County Judge, represents all of Cameron County). County offices are partisan; the Democratic and Republican Parties hold primaries in March of the year that their office term expires.

The City of Brownsville falls under two Texas House of Representatives districts. Each representative has a two-year term and is elected in the same manner as other partisan elected officials. The elected representatives include, District 37: Alex Dominguez (D) (since 2019), and District 38: Erin Gámez (D) (since 2021). Brownsville is represented by Texas Senatorial District 27, the incumbent senator is Morgan LaMantia (D) (since 2023). This city is represented by Texas's 34th congressional district. The incumbent Representative is Vicente Gonzalez (D) (since 2023).

The city holds several federal office buildings. The United States Postal Service operates post offices in Brownsville. Downtown Brownsville is served by the Old Federal Courthouse; it is now used as a City Hall. The National Weather Service operates an office and a Nexrad weather radar site in east Brownsville. They provide forecasts and radar coverage for Deep South Texas and the adjacent coastal waters. Other federal building located within the city limits of Brownsville include: Social Security Administration and the Reynaldo G. Garza – Filemon B. Vela United States Courthouse. Military buildings and battle sites include the Brownsville Armed Forces Reserve Center (AFRC) host units from the United States Army Reserve and the Texas Army National Guard, and the Reserve Officers' Training Corps (ROTC).

== Education ==
=== Primary and secondary education ===
Brownsville Independent School District (BISD) serves most of the city. Enrollment in the 2018–2019 school year was 44,402 students, 95% of whom are economically disadvantaged. Enrollment at BISD reached a high of 49,991 students in 2010–2011, and has declined an average of 1,000 students per year since 2014–2015. It is the 17th largest school district in Texas. There are seven high schools within the district: Homer Hanna, Gladys Porter, James Pace, Simon Rivera, Lopez, BECHS, and Veterans Memorial.

A portion of northern Brownsville is served by the Los Fresnos Consolidated Independent School District. South Texas Independent School District, a magnet school district, operates a medical academy in northern Brownsville. There are several private parochial elementary and middle schools located throughout the community. The Roman Catholic Diocese of Brownsville operates Catholic schools in the Rio Grande Valley, including Brownsville.

=== Colleges and universities ===
UT School of Public Health in 2006

Six colleges and universities are located within the Brownsville boundaries. The University of Texas Rio Grande Valley, part of the University of Texas system, was founded in 2014 after the merger of the University of Texas at Brownsville and University of Texas–Pan American. It is the 10th-largest university in Texas, having 25,137 undergraduates, 3,068 graduate students, and 439 professionals enrolled in 2018. In 2017, The Hispanic Outlook in Higher Education ranked the university third in the country in awarding bachelor's degrees to Hispanic students.

Texas Southmost College is a community college located near the southern border of Brownsville. As of 2018, it had a total enrollment of 7,132. Students usually transfer to the neighboring University of Texas Rio Grande Valley. The city operates three vocational schools. These include the South Texas Vocational Technical Institute, Brightwood College campus (formerly known as Kaplan College), and Southern Careers Institute.

The University of Texas Health Science Center at Houston, School of Public Health (UTSPH), is one of five regional campuses established by the Regional Academic Health Center program in 2001; it is located on the Brownsville campus of the University of Texas at Rio Grande Valley. The campus offers a PhD program in epidemiology and a Doctor of Public Health (DrPH) in health promotion, the only program of its kind available in South Texas. The campus directs its attention to health concerns in the Rio Grande Valley, including diabetes, obesity, and cardiovascular disease. It also centers its concerns on genetics and its relationship to infectious and chronic disease.

== Infrastructure ==
=== Transportation ===
==== Major highways ====
Brownsville is served by Interstate 69E, sharing its alignment with U.S. Route 77. The highway connects to the cities of Kingsville and Corpus Christi. U.S. Route 77 was a proposed part of the North American Free Trade Agreement's completed Interstate 69 corridor. Other highways that serve the Brownsville area are U.S. Route 83, U.S. Route 281, State Highway 4 and State Highway 48. Interstate 169/State Highway 550 is a toll road that connects North Brownsville to the Port of Brownsville; it forms a loop around the outer city limits of Brownsville. An interchange in nearby Olmito carries traffic from Interstate 69E onto the highway.

==== Mass transit ====
Established in mid-Brownsville in 1978, the Brownsville Urban System (BUS), currently known as the Brownsville Metro, consists of three hubs that run 13 routes covering a large portion of Brownsville. The system provides 11 paratransit vans to disabled passengers, complying with the standards for the Americans with Disabilities Act. It is the only mass transit system in its county and one of the largest in the Rio Grande Valley. Annual ridership for 2015 was 1,384,474.

==== Intercity transit ====
The Brownsville/South Padre Island International Airport (BRO) provides passengers with daily nonstop service to American Eagle hubs Dallas/Fort Worth International Airport, United Express to George Bush Intercontinental Airport in Houston, and World Atlantic Airlines, which operates charter and on-demand flights to Miami International Airport. The airport received a $12.7 million grant from the Federal Aviation Administration for the construction of a new 85,000 ft^{2} (7,900 m^{2}) terminal facility. The project is expected to commence construction by late 2018.

==== Bike share and trails ====
The City of Brownsville currently has 64 mi (103 km) of hike and bike trails and on-street bike lanes. In 2016, a bike-share program was established in Brownsville in collaboration with the University of Texas Rio Grande Valley. Six bike stations were installed. The contract was renewed with another company to provide a "dockless ride-share program" in late 2018.

==== Railroad ====
Several attempts were made to attract a railroad, and the St. Louis, Brownsville and Mexico Railway reached Brownsville in 1904. In 1910, a railroad bridge was constructed between Brownsville and Matamoros (Mexico), and regular service between the two towns began. The introduction of the rail link to Brownsville opened the area for settlement by northern farmers, who subsequently arrived in the lower Rio Grande Valley in large numbers.

The new settlers cleared the land of brush, built extensive irrigation systems and roads, and introduced large-scale truck farming. In 1904, H. G. Stillwell Sr. planted the first commercial citrus orchard in the area, thus opening the way for citrus fruit culture, one of the valley's leading industries. The expansion of farming in the area, and the railroad link to the north, brought new prosperity to Brownsville and spurred a host of civic improvements.

Brownsville was served by the Missouri Pacific Railroad night train from Houston, the Pioneer (#315/316) until 1964, and a daily train from Houston, the Valley Eagle (#321/322), until 1962. Today, the Brownsville and Rio Grande International Railroad (reporting mark BRG) is a terminal switching railroad headquartered in Brownsville. It operates 45 mi (72 km) of line at the Port of Brownsville, and interchanges with Union Pacific Railroad and TFM. BRG traffic includes steel, agricultural products, food products, and general commodities.

==== International bridges ====
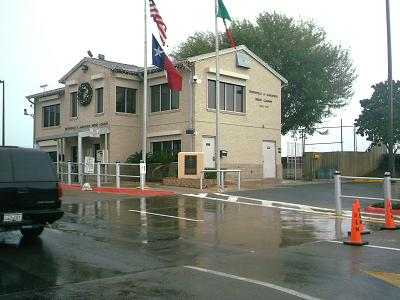
The Brownsville and Matamoros Bridge office pictured in 2006

Brownsville has three international bridges that connect to Mexico. These include the Brownsville & Matamoros International Bridge (B&M), Gateway International Bridge and the Veterans International Bridge at Los Tomates.

=== Utilities ===
Electricity, water, and wastewater services in Brownsville are provided by the Brownsville Public Utilities Board. Since it is a public utility, the city commission appoints six members of the utilities board with the mayor serving as the seventh member (ex-officio). As of 2016, it is the 68th-largest public power utility in the country by number of customers served (48,232). Its power generation was ranked 51st in the US with 1,638,579 megawatt-hours. Renewable resources were projected to increase with partial help from the proposed addition of a 400-megawatt Tenaska combined-cycle electric generating plant in 2015.

A series of wind turbines was also built in the northeast part of Cameron County. The board operates three treatment plants in Brownsville; it also owns 92.91% of the Southmost Regional Water Authority groundwater treatment facility. Several liquefied natural gas companies are currently in the process of establishing pipelines in the city. Two were denied a review of their applications after missing several deadlines.

== Arts and culture ==
A street mural in Downtown Brownsville

Brownsville is known for its strong Mexican culture. Charro Days is a two-nation fiesta celebration held in Brownsville in cooperation with Matamoros, Mexico. It is accompanied with El Grito, a joyous shout originating in Mexican culture. Musicians and actors of Mexican heritage make appearances. Sombrero Festival is a continuation of Charro Days. It is a three-day event consisting of performances from tejano, corrido and other traditional Mexican artists as well as a variety of contests. In 2016, a Mexican art gallery donated a statue called Mr. Charro that was unveiled at a park.

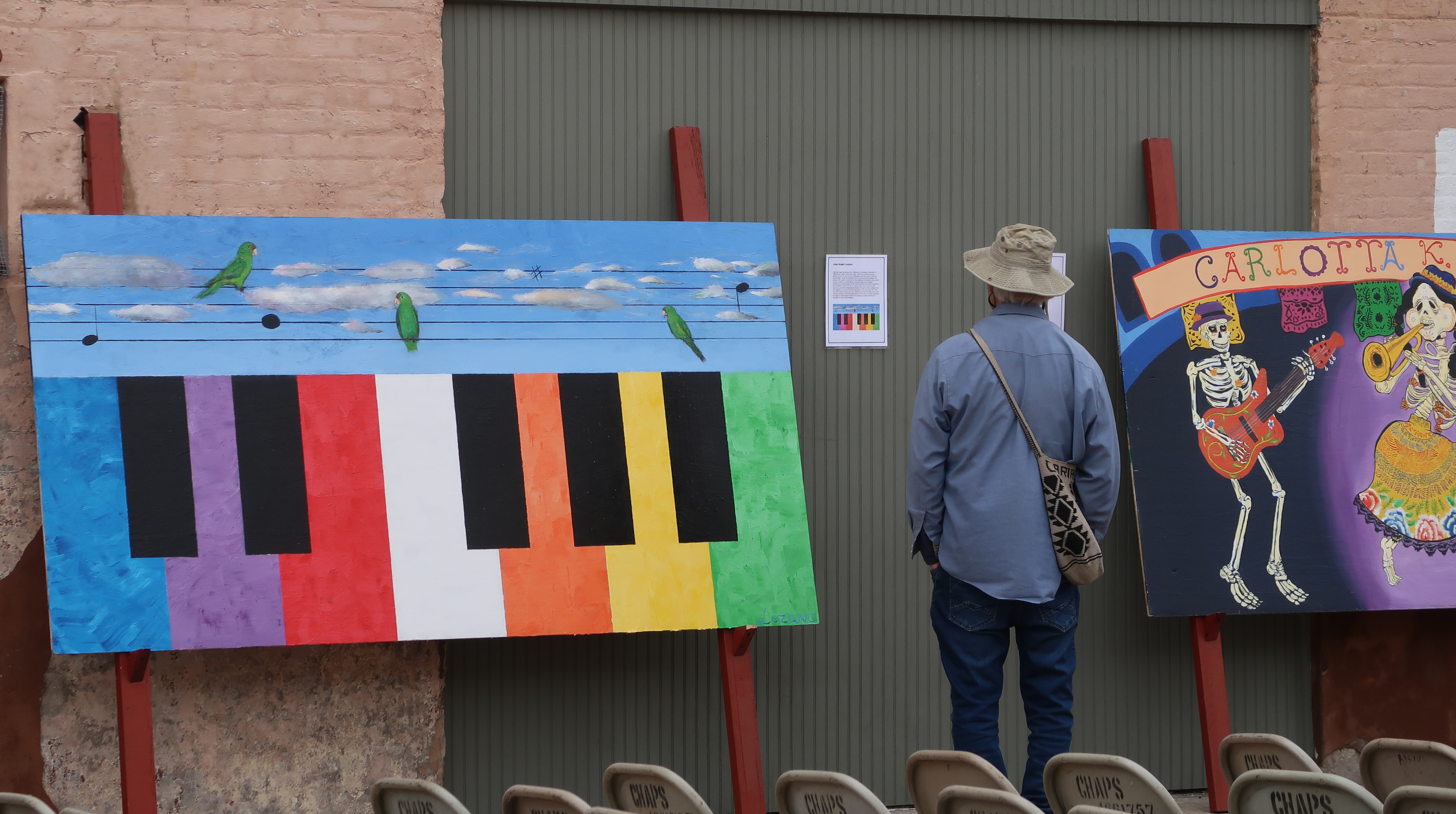
A man looking at a painting at the 23rd Annual Brownsville Latin Jazz Festival

The city hosts the Latin Jazz Festival every year around early October in Downtown Brownsville. It is a three-day celebration of local Latin jazz performers, art and dance. The festival began in 1997, founded by American musician Tito Puente. Brownsville has a growing number of arts galleries, including the Puente Art Studio, the Flower Shop Art Studio & Residency, the first live-in art residency in the region, the B&E Art Studio, and the Rusteberg Art Gallery. The Brownsville Museum of Fine Arts features exhibitions of Egyptian and Astronomical art. It was formerly known as the Brownsville Art League, formed by a group of eight women. The museum underwent a renovation in 1960, featuring a 4,000 ft^{2} (370 m^{2}) studio. In 2002, it changed its name to its current name and underwent another renovation. According to the Association of Art Museum Directors, women account for 38% of leadership positions.

Brownsville also has several museums dedicated to historic artifacts and military equipment. The Historic Brownsville Museum opened to the public in 1986. The building was used as a Spanish Colonial Revival passenger depot and was later abandoned. It features Spanish architecture and education programs. Several renovations were made over time, including the addition of a Spanish-style fountain, a courtyard and an engine building. The Commemorative Air Force Museum houses World War II aircraft and holds tours on the early events of wars in Asia and Europe. It also documents the stories of pilots who were part of the 201st Mexican Fighter Squadron.

Built in 1850 by Henry Miller, the Stillman House Museum was owned by Charles Stillman and Mexican consul Manuel Pérez Treviño. It was the site of meetings with Mexican general and president Porfirio Diaz. The Stillman's great-grandson purchased the house after the previous homeowners sold it and donated it to the city after several renovations. It opened to the public in 1960. The home sustained damage from Hurricane Dolly in 2008 and reopened to the public the following year after it was restored. Costumes of the Americas Museum is an indigenous clothing museum. Inspired by Bessie Kirkland Johnson, the museum was opened in 1997 featuring clothing from indigenous people in several Mexican states and other Latin American countries.

=== Filming location ===
Year	Title	Lead actor(s)
1981	Back Roads	Sally Field, Tommy Lee Jones
2012	Get the Gringo	Mel Gibson
2013	A Night in Old Mexico	Robert Duvall
2015	Endgame	Efren Ramirez, Rico Rodriguez
2017	The Green Ghost	Danny Trejo

== Media ==
=== Print ===
The Brownsville Herald is the city's major daily newspaper. It has a circulation of 15,880 with 16,409 on Sundays. Other newspapers that share content within Brownsville include The Monitor (headquartered in McAllen), the Valley Morning Star (headquartered in Harlingen) and The Rider, the official weekly campus paper of the University of Texas Rio Grande Valley.

=== Radio ===
FM stations include:

- KBNR (88.3) – Spanish-language Christian
- KJJF/KHID (88.9) – Relevant Radio
- XHMLS (91.3) – Latin pop
- KESO (92.7) – Classic Hits (70s/80s Hits)
- XHAAA (93.1) – Regional Mexican
- XHO-FM (93.5) – News/talk
- KFRQ (94.5) – Classic Rock
- KVMV (96.9) – Contemporary Christian
- XEEW-FM (97.7) – Latin pop
- KKPS (99.5) – Hot AC
- KTEX (100.3) – Country
- KNVO (101.1) – Spanish Adult Hits
- KBUC (102.1) – Tejano
- KBFM (104.1) – Rhythmic Top 40
- KJAV (104.9) – Adult Contemporary/Spanish AC Hits
- KXIQ-LP (105.1)
- KRIX (105.5) – Classic Rock
- XHNA (105.9) – Regional Mexican
- KHKZ (106.3) – Hot AC
- XHVTH (107.1) – Adult Hits
- KVLY (107.9) – AC

AM stations include:

- KURV (710) – News/Talk
- KVNS (1700) – Sports Talk

=== Television ===
Brownsville has three licensed broadcast full power television stations:

- KVEO-TV (Channel 23; DT 24) – NBC affiliate
  - 23.2 CBS affiliate
- KNWS-LD (Channel 64; DT 27) – Azteca America affiliate
  - 67.2 CW affiliate
- KXFX-CD (Channel 67; DT 20) – Fox affiliate

== Notable people ==
- James Carlos Blake, novelist, received his elementary education at Saint Joseph Academy
- Shelbie Bruce, actress
- José Tomás Canales, lawyer, writer, politician
- Oscar Casares, author and professor the University of Texas at Austin; published two books about Brownsville, including Amigoland (2009)
- Josie Del Castillo (born 1992), painter
- Monica De La Cruz, U.S. representative for Texas
- Osvaldo de León, actor and model
- Buddy Garcia, 2012 member of the Texas Railroad Commission
- Reynaldo G. Garza (1915–2004), Judge appointed to the United States District Court in 1961 by President John F. Kennedy, and to the United States Court of Appeals by President Jimmy Carter in 1978
- Tony Garza, former United States Ambassador to Mexico
- Gilberto Hinojosa, county judge of Cameron County from 1995 to 2007; Texas Democratic Party chairman from 2012 to 2024
- Mifflin Kenedy (1818–1895), South Texas rancher and steamboat businessman
- Pierre Yves Kéralum (1817–1872), priest and architect who designed the Immaculate Conception Cathedral
- Bernard L. Kowalski (1929–2007), film and television director
- Kris Kristofferson, country singer, songwriter and actor, 2004 Country Music Hall of Fame Inductee
- Eddie Lucio III, member of the Texas House of Representatives
- Eddie Lucio Jr., member of the Texas State Senate
- Bianca Marroquín, theater and television actress
- Lushious Massacr, drag queen, activist, and social media personality
- Dolissa Medina, Chicana filmmaker, writer, and multimedia artist
- Grace Napolitano, United States Representative for California's 32nd congressional district
- Jose Rolando Olvera Jr., United States District Judge for the Southern District of Texas appointed by U.S. President Barack Obama in 2015
- Américo Paredes (1915–1999), author of George Washington Gómez
- Rudy Ruiz, author, entrepreneur and advocate; attended Saint Joseph Academy
- Efren Saldivar, nurse and convicted serial killer
- Ramón Saldívar, scholar of Chicano literature and culture, awarded the National Humanities Medal by President Barack Obama in 2011; professor at Stanford University
- Julian Schnabel, neo-expressionism painter and Academy Award-nominated, Golden Globe winner and director of The Diving Bell and the Butterfly
- Bruce Sterling, author of the Mirrorshades anthology and one of the pioneers of the cyberpunk genre
- Emeraude Toubia, actress (Shadowhunters)
- Benjamin D. Wood (1894–1986), one of the pioneers of learning technologies and automated testing methods
- Jaime Zapata (1979–2011), U.S. Immigration and Customs Enforcement agent who was ambushed, shot, and killed by Los Zetas in San Luis Potosí, Mexico. He was returning from a meeting in Mexico City; Victor Avila, another agent who accompanied him, was wounded in the same incident

== In literature in the arts ==
- Brownsville: Stories is a short story collection by Oscar Casares, the stories are loosely set in Brownsville.
- "Brownsville Girl" by Bob Dylan and Sam Shepard was a song on Dylan's 1986 album Knocked Out Loaded.
- "It's All Here In Brownsville", the final track of Full Force Galesburg by the Mountain Goats.
- Owing to its location on the 28th Parallel Brownsville is listed (as "Brownsville in the Cameron") as a potential site for the story's moon launch in Jules Verne's 1865 book "From the Earth to the Moon"

== Sister city ==
- Heroica Matamoros, Tamaulipas, Mexico (Since 1995)
- Barranquilla, Colombia (Since 2013)

== See also ==
- José de Escandón y Helguera, 1st Count of Sierra Gorda
- List of museums in the Texas Gulf Coast
- Nuevo Santander
- Timeline of Brownsville, Texas#Bibliography
- Virreinato de Nueva España
