= Brownsville & Matamoros International Bridge =

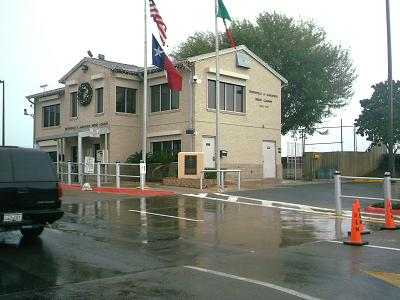
- Administration office and Pedestrian Lane at B&M Bridge in 2006
- Coordinates: 25°53′31″N 97°30′16″W
- Carries: Vehicle and pedestrian
- Crosses: Rio Grande
- Begins: Brownsville, Texas, U.S.
- Ends: Matamoros, Tamaulipas, Mexico
- Official name: Brownsville & Matamoros Bridge
- Other name(s): B&M International Bridge; Brownsville-Matamoros International Bridge; Express Bridge
- Owner: Government of Mexico and Union Pacific Railroad Company
- Website: www.cbp.gov/about/contact/ports/brownsville-texas-2301
- Preceded by: Gateway International Bridge
- Followed by: Free Trade International Bridge

Characteristics
- Total length: 227 ft (69 m)
- No. of spans: 1
- No. of lanes: 4

Rail characteristics
- No. of tracks: 1 (defunct)

History
- Constructed by: Brownsville and Matamoros Bridge Company
- Construction start: April 1909
- Construction cost: US$225,000 (1910)
- Opened: December 12, 1910

Location
- Interactive map of Brownsville & Matamoros International Bridge

The Brownsville & Matamoros International Bridge, also known as B&M International Bridge, and Express Bridge, is one of three international bridges that cross the U.S.-Mexico border between the cities of Brownsville, Texas, and Matamoros, Tamaulipas. This international bridge unites the Matamoros–Brownsville Metropolitan Area, which counts with a population of 1,136,995, making it the 4th largest metropolitan area in the Mexico-US border.

It is popularly called the "Old Bridge" (Spanish: Puente Viejo) because its original incarnation, still standing, is the city's oldest international bridge. In 1999, Texas state Historical marker 11778 was placed at the site by the Texas Historical Commission and the Cameron County Historical Commission to recognize the bridge's historical significance.

== History ==
In 1904, when the railroad constructed by St. Louis, Brownsville and Mexico Railway reached Brownsville, it was separated from the Mexican National Railway line by the Rio Grande. In 1908, future vice president John Nance Garner IV presented a bill to congress that would allow the construction of a bridge to span the river and connect the railways.

=== The original B&M International Bridge ===
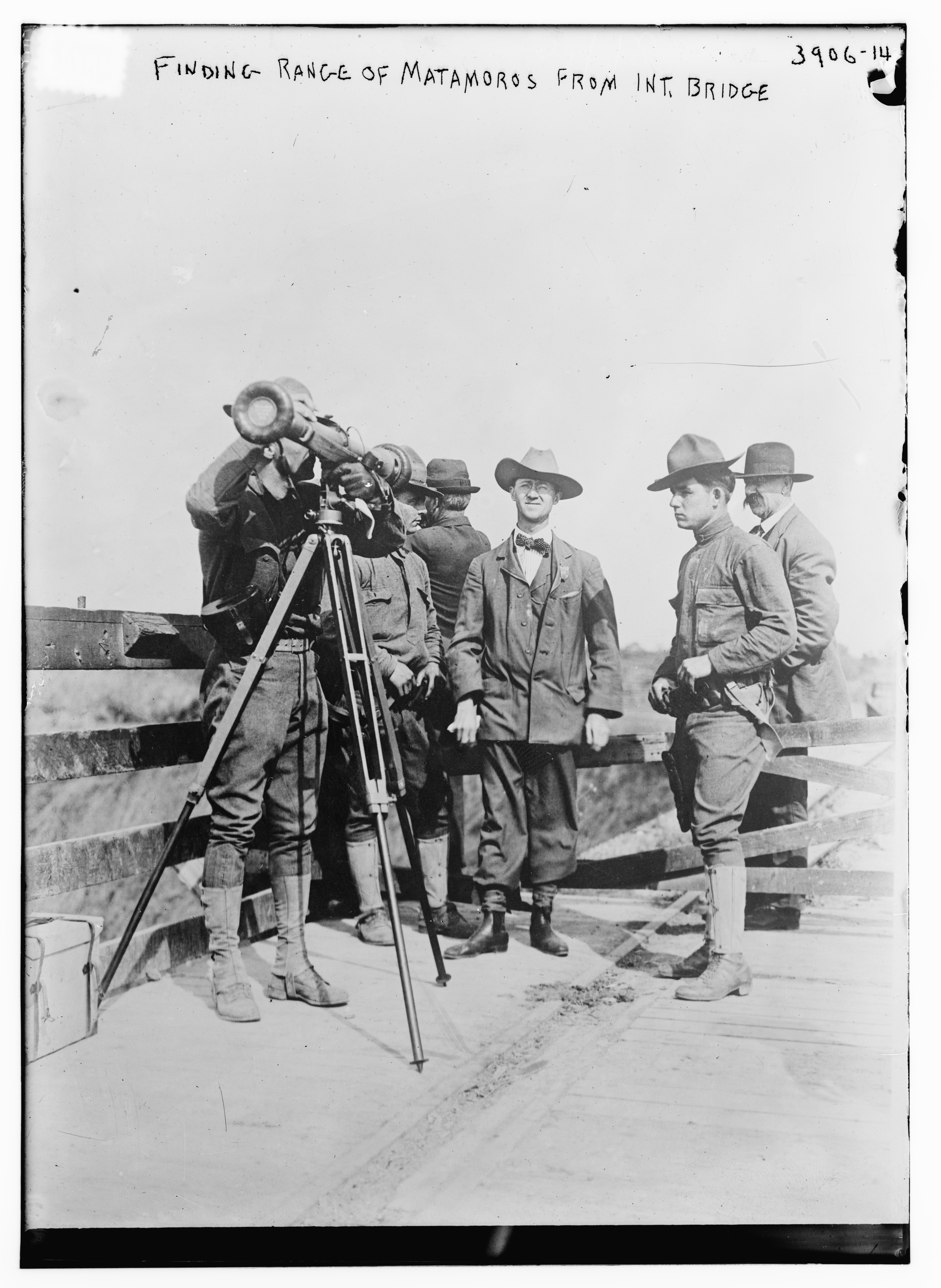
U.S. troops on the Int. Bridge, 1915

In 1909, the Brownsville and Matamoros Bridge Company, jointly owned by St. Louis, Brownsville and Mexico Railway and the Mexican National Railway, was incorporated to oversee construction and operation of the bridge. Work began in April. The Foundation Company of New York lay the concrete foundation, and the Wisconsin Bridge and Iron Company of Milwaukee constructed the steel spans. To accommodate river traffic, the bridge was constructed as a swing bridge, an additional expense that proved unnecessary, as river traffic grew inactive before construction was fully completed. The swing mechanism was tested in July 1910 and never opened again. Construction of the 227 foot structure cost approximately $225,000.

The first B&M International Bridge opened for traffic on December 12, 1910. The bridge was intended to serve all land-based international traffic, including pedestrian, animal-drawn, automobile and rail. On opening day, the Brownsville Herald published an elaborate set of tolls, including five cents for a foot passenger, ten cents for equestrians, twenty cents for an automobile with driver (plus five cents additional per extra passenger) and weight- and passenger-based charges for carriages and carts. Additional charges applied to excessive luggage. Livestock and trade goods were taxed. Children under seven who were accompanied by an adult were permitted to cross the bridge free.

The bridge was widened in 1953 and 1992 to accommodate larger commercial trucks.

=== The second B&M International Bridge ===
In spite of the enlargements, increasing traffic demands made the combined usage of the bridge problematic. Automobile traffic on both sides of the US and Mexican border had to be halted to allow trains to cross. In 1997, a new concrete, four-lane toll bridge was opened adjacent to the original bridge to handle automobile traffic. The old bridge today serves primarily railway traffic, though it was also used for truck traffic before the opening of the Veteran's International Bridge in East Brownsville. The new bridge features a central concrete divider and a separate pedestrian sidewalk.

== Current ==
Currently, the B&M Bridge Company is jointly owned by the federal government of Mexico and the Union Pacific Railroad Company. Union Pacific trains cross the original International Bridge. The B&M Bridge Company is now calling its automobile bridge the Express Bridge in honor of its issuance in 1999 of prepaid toll express cards. The Express Bridge is also open to, and collects tolls from, bicyclists and pedestrians.

Bridge maintenance, security and administration is maintained on the US side, which is also where tolls are collected.

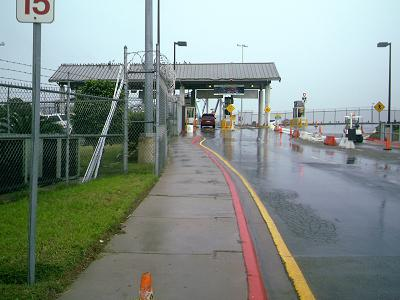
South bound lanes at B&M Bridge

== Border crossing ==
The Brownsville B&M Port of Entry opened in 1909 with the completion of the Brownsville & Matamoros International Bridge. Since 1999, all truck traffic has been diverted to the Veterans and Los Indios crossings.

== See also ==
- Gateway International Bridge
- Veteran's International Bridge
- List of crossings of the Rio Grande
- List of international bridges in North America

== Sources ==
- Bridges of the Area: The Brownsville & Matamoros Bridge - Puente Viejo. Accessed July 3, 2007.
- History of the Brownsville-Matamoros Bridge. Accessed July 3, 2007.
- Texas Historical Commission Searchable Database. Accessed July 3, 2007.
- Werner, George. St. Louis, Brownsville and Mexico Railway The Handbook of Texas Online. Accessed July 3, 2007.
