= B&M (disambiguation) =

B&M is a chain of discount stores in the UK.

B&M may also refer to:

- B&M Baked Beans, a brand of baked beans from American foods holding company B&G Foods
  - B&M Baked Beans factory, a former bean factory in Portland, Maine
- Black & Mild, a cigar brand
- Bolliger & Mabillard, a Swiss roller coaster manufacturer
- Boston and Maine Railroad, a defunct American railroad company
- Brasil & Movimento, a Brazilian motorcycle manufacturer
- Brick and mortar, a business with a physical presence in a building
- Bricks & Minifigs, an American third-party Lego retail store chain
- Brownsville & Matamoros International Bridge, one of three bridges that cross the U.S.-Mexico border between the cities of Brownsville, Texas, and Matamoros, Tamaulipas
  - Brownsville – B&M Port of Entry
- Boston and Montana Consolidated Copper and Silver Mining Company, a mining company in the United States

== See also ==
- Brecon and Merthyr Tydfil Junction Railway, often abbreviated B&MR
- BM (disambiguation)
- BNM (disambiguation)
