= Dolissa Medina =

Chicana filmmaker

Dolissa Medina is a Chicana filmmaker, writer, and multimedia artist originally from Brownsville, Texas. Her work deals with themes of queerness, history, memory, and place.

== Life and career ==
She earned a B.A. in Journalism from San Francisco State University and an MFA in Visual Art from UC San Diego.

She is a founding member of the Caca Colectiva, a San Francisco-based film collective and found footage archive.

Medina is currently working on a feature-length personal documentary with the working title Small Town, Turn Away about her hometown of Brownsville, in the border region of Texas. In the film, she returns to Brownsville in search of information about her older cousin who died of AIDS in a meditation on home, colonization, and "temporal hauntings".

Medina has written for publications such as the San Francisco Bay Guardian, Release Print, and Frontera Magazine. Her writing has also appeared in anthologies including Generation Q: Inheriting Stonewall and Southwestern Women: New Voices.

She divides her time between Germany and the United States.

== Filmography ==
Year	Film	Notes
2000	Grounds	11 min./16mm
2004	A Lineage of Kind Men	3:30 min./16mm/found footage.
2006	19: Victoria, Texas	4:00 min./video. Based on the true story of a group of immigrants who died in a shipping container near the city of Victoria, Texas.
2006	Cartography of Ashes	45 min./Super-8 and 16mm. A documentary and site-specific outdoor film projection about the 1906 San Francisco earthquake in collaboration with the San Francisco Fire Department.
2008	Kindergarten Prometheus	5 min./film and video
2010	Half Shell	4 min./hand-processed 16mm and video
2010	The Moon Song of Assassination	7 min./video
2014	This Night, Who is Gonna Cry for You	5 min./found footage video.
2015	The Crow Furnace	30 min./16mm found footage and live action
2017	Space Oddity	5 min./Super 8 dual projection

== Awards ==
Medina was the recipient of a 1999 Film Arts Foundation STAND Grant for emerging filmmakers, and 2002 Film Arts Foundation Personal Works grant. In 2005, Medina received the Bay Area Video Coalition Mediamaker Award and the Cultural Equity Grant from the San Francisco Arts Commission. In 2010-11, she was the recipient of a Fulbright Fellowship to Berlin. Medina has also received grants from the UC-San Diego Center for the Humanities, the Russell Foundation, Pacific Pioneer Fund, Film Arts Foundation, and LEF Foundation.
