= BNM =

BNM, or Bnm, may refer to:

- Banca Naţională a Moldovei, the central bank of the Republic of Moldova
- Bank Negara Malaysia, the central bank of Malaysia
- Belau National Museum, museum in Palau
- BNM Institute of Technology, an engineering education institution in Bangalore, India
- bnm, the ISO 639-3 code for the Tanga language spoken in Cameroon and Equatorial Guinea
- BNM, the National Rail code for Burnham railway station in the county of Berkshire, UK
- Bórd na Móna, Irish semi-state energy company, now known as BnM

== See also ==
- B&M (disambiguation)
