= Brownsville Metro =

Mass transit system based in Brownsville, Texas

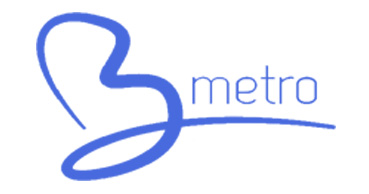
- Founded: 1979
- Headquarters: 755 International Blvd.
- Locale: Brownsville, TX
- Service type: bus service, paratransit
- Routes: 13
- Hubs: 3
- Chief executive: Norma Zamora
- Website: brownsvillemetro.com

Brownsville Metro, or "B Metro" for short, is a mass transit system based in and serving Brownsville, TX. It is currently the largest mass transit system in Cameron County and the Rio Grande Valley, Texas, and is the only mass transit system in Cameron County, Texas. Brownsville Metro consists of 13 bus routes and two terminals. Brownsville Metro carries more than 1.5 million passengers a year. There is only two mass transit systems in the Rio Grande Valley the second being Metro McAllen, which only consists of 7 bus routes and one bus terminal. In July 2021, Brownsville Metro began bus service to limited routes on Sundays.

== Terminals ==
Restaurants in the terminal include: Wingstop and Subway. more spaces available for additional business.

- La Plaza - Main downtown terminal which serves the majority of the routes
- Northside Transfer Station - Built late 2004 as a means of expanding BUS mass transit service to North Brownsville and its surrounding cities

== Routes ==
BUS operates 12 fixed routes:

- 1 - Westend
- 2 - Jefferson/Central - Serves Valley Baptist Medical Center in Brownsville
- 3 - Boca Chica
- 4 - Los Ebanos
- 5 - Paredes/Alton Gloor - Serves Valley Regional Medical Center
- 6 - Southmost
- 7 - Jose Colunga/ESTS - Serves the Brownsville/South Padre Island International Airport
- 8 - Hortencia
- 9 - Austin - Serves the Brownsville Public Utilities Board Main Office
- 11 - OPI (Old Port Isabel)
- 14 - Scorpion Connector
- 30 - Southeast (Began service on May 22, 2007)

=== Former Routes ===
- 3 - Rockwell - Split into Route 3 Boca Chica and Route 5 Paredes/Alton Gloor on August 3, 2020, as part of the bus redesign.
- 4 - Los Ebanos - Service from Downtown Brownsville to Sunrise Mall through the Los Ebanos neighborhood. Discontinued on October 5, 2015; due to low ridership; partially replaced by Route 20 revision and a section redundant with Route 13. Predecessor of current Route 4.
- 5 - Alton Gloor - Discontinued on August 3, 2020, as part of the bus redesign. Route 1 already covered most of the route.
- 7 - Billy Mitchell - Renamed 7 Jose Colunga/ESTS on August 3, 2020, because the route no longer travels on Billy Mitchell.
- 8 - Lemon - Shortened on August 3, 2020, and renamed Route 8 Hortencia as part of the bus redesign. Deleted portion replaced by shortened Route 6.
- 10 - Amigoland/UTB - Service from Downtown Brownsville to the former Amigoland Mall, now part of The University of Texas at Brownsville. Discontinued on October 1, 2003, due to low ridership.
- 12 - Crosstown - Service from East Brownsville to West Brownsville via Boca Chica Blvd. This was one of the few routes in BUS history not to depart from a main terminal.
- 13 - Sunrise Mall - Renamed Route 13 Pablo Kisel.
- 13 - Pablo Kisel - Began service on May 22, 2007. Discontinued on August 3, 2020, as part of the bus redesign. Replaced by revised Routes 2 and 3 and restored Route 4.
- 14 - ITECC Campus - Renamed 14 Sam Perl Blvd. in Fall 2008.
- 14 - Sam Perl Blvd. - Renamed 14 Scorpion Connector when route was extended and Route 15 was created.
- 15 - Scorpion Circulator - Discontinued on August 25, 2015, due to contract expiring.
- 20 - North - Began service on February 27, 2006. Discontinued on August 3, 2020, as part of the bus redesign. Replaced by revised Routes 3 and 11 and restored Route 4.
- 21 - North Loop - Service on Alton Gloor Blvd, US 281, and along the northwest of Brownsville. Began Service in Fall 2013. Discontinued on October 5, 2015, due to low ridership; partially replaced by revision to Route 5.
- 23 - Paredes - Began service on February 27, 2006. Combined into Routes 3 & 13 on May 22, 2007.
- 31 - Brownsville/La Paloma- Began service in Fall 2008. Discontinued in 2010 or 2011.
- Trolley Service - Provided narrated trolley service departing from the Brownsville Visitor Center on Ruben Torres Sr. Blvd and had scheduled stops at several city points, including Gladys Porter Zoo.

== Fleet ==
- 17 - Gillig "Phantom"
- 10 - Gillig "Low Floor"
- 2 - 1992 Replica Trolleys
- 4 - ElDorado National "EZ Rider"

== Paratransit Service ==
All City of Brownsville BUS fixed route vehicles meet applicable Americans with Disabilities Act (ADA) requirements and are accessible by people who use mobility aids. In accordance with the ADA, the City of Brownsville also operates an ADA Paratransit Service for people with disabilities who are unable to ride fixed route public transportation.

== Facts ==
- B Metro Service is not provided on the following holidays: New Year's Day, Independence Day, Thanksgiving Day, and Christmas Day.
