= Veterans International Bridge at Los Tomates =

- Coordinates: 25°53′02″N 97°28′34″W
- Carries: US 77 / US 83, Fed. 101 / Fed. 180 and pedestrians
- Crosses: Rio Grande
- Locale: Brownsville, Texas – Matamoros, Mexico
- Other name(s): Veterans International Bridge, Veterans Bridge, Los Tomates Bridge, Puente Internacional Gral. Ignacio Zaragoza
- Maintained by: Cameron County, Texas

Characteristics
- Total length: 4,024 ft (1,227 m)
- Width: 42 ft (13 m)

Location
- Interactive map of Veterans International Bridge at Los Tomates

The Veterans International Bridge at Los Tomates is one of three international bridges that span the Mexico–United States border between the cities of Brownsville, Texas, and Matamoros, Tamaulipas. It is also known as simply as the Veterans Bridge, the Expressway 77/83 Bridge, the Brownsville Expressway Bridge, and on the Mexico side as the Puente Internacional General Ignacio Zaragoza. The bridge is owned and operated by Cameron County. The bridge commenced operation on April 30, 1999.

The bridge unites the Matamoros–Brownsville Metropolitan Area, which has a population of 1,136,995, making it the 4th largest metropolitan area on the Mexico-U.S. border.

== Description ==
Beginning operations on April 30, 1999, the Veterans International Bridge is presently the newest of the three bridges in the Brownsville area. The roadway consists of four lanes and a truck lane. The bridge also has sidewalks on both sides to accommodate pedestrian traffic. The bridge operates daily from 6 a.m. to midnight.

On the Brownsville side, the bridge connects to the southern terminus of US 77 and US 83 and the Brownsville – Veterans Port of Entry. On the Matamoros side, it connects to the northern terminus of Fed. 101 / Fed. 180.

As of October 1, 2022 the toll for bicycles and pedestrians is US$1.00 ($26.00 MXN). The toll for cars, pick-up trucks, and motorcycles is US$4.00 ($104.00 MXN). The toll for trucks begins at US$11.00 ($286.00 MXN) for those with two-axles. In the fiscal year ending in September 2010, the bridge saw 1,607,271 crossings, approximately double that of the Los Indios Bridge but half of the number at the Gateway International Bridge. This corresponded to a toll revenue in excess of US$6.6 million.

== Border crossing ==
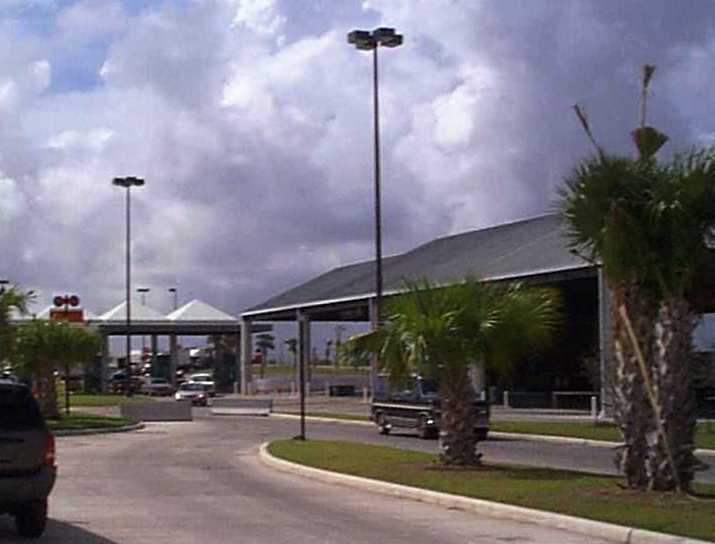
Brownsville Veterans Port of Entry

The Brownsville Veterans Port of Entry opened in 1999 with the completion of the Veterans International Bridge at Los Tomates. The bridge was built primarily to divert commercial freight traffic away from the busy downtown bridges, but about a third of the passenger vehicles also cross at this point. The Veterans Port of Entry is the easternmost US-Mexico border crossing, and is by far the newest of the three crossings between Brownsville and Matamoros. In 2019, average daily traffic was about 4,000 vehicles including about 800 trucks.

== History ==
Planning for the Veterans International Bridge was part of a broader effort to move commercial traffic away from the downtown Brownsville–Matamoros crossings. This was a multi-agency project and involved a presidential permit, an elevated U.S. 77/83 extension to the border station, relocation of Brownsville's Lincoln Park, relocation of a Rio Grande levee and dedication of 167 acres along the river for a wildlife corridor. The project required coordination among the City of Brownsville, Cameron County, the Texas Department of Transportation, the General Services Administration and Mexican agencies. With the completion of the bridge and 10 other projects, international trucking can now bypass the heavily congested downtown corridors of Brownsville and Matamoros.

== Design and engineering ==
Design and Project management were completed by Maverick Engineering, Inc. – Design and project management of the Veterans’ International Bridge inbound traffic lane expansion. The scope of the project included the addition of one auto lane for fast access and several lanes for industrial traffic growth. One of these lanes was for the FAST processing of inbound NAFTA freight. The bridge connects with Interstate 69E/U.S. Highway 77/83 and is a major transit route for freight bound areas across the United States.

== See also ==
- List of international bridges in North America
- List of Mexico–United States border crossings
