= Gateway International Bridge =

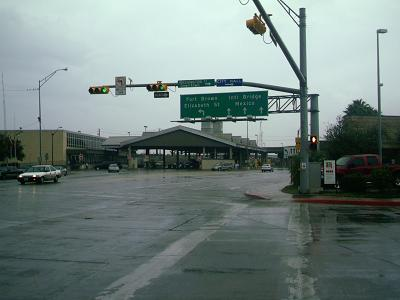
- Gateway International Bridge as pictured from International Blvd. in Brownsville, Texas in 2006
- Coordinates: 25.8984°N 97.4977°W
- Locale: Brownsville, Texas
- Other name: The New Bridge
- Owner: Cameron County
- Maintained by: Cameron County
- Website: www.cbp.gov/contact/ports/brownsvillelos-indios

Location
- Interactive map of Gateway International Bridge

Gateway International Bridge is one of three international bridges that cross the U.S.-Mexico border between the cities of Brownsville, Texas, and Matamoros, Tamaulipas. It is owned and operated by Cameron County. Over the past century, it has developed the nickname of "The New Bridge" (Spanish: Puente Nuevo) when the bridge was remodeled back in the 20th century. Despite the fact that the Veteran's International Bridge is newer than Gateway, it still retains its nickname.

This international bridge unites the Matamoros–Brownsville Metropolitan Area, which counts with a population of 1,136,995, making it the 4th largest metropolitan area in the Mexico-US border.

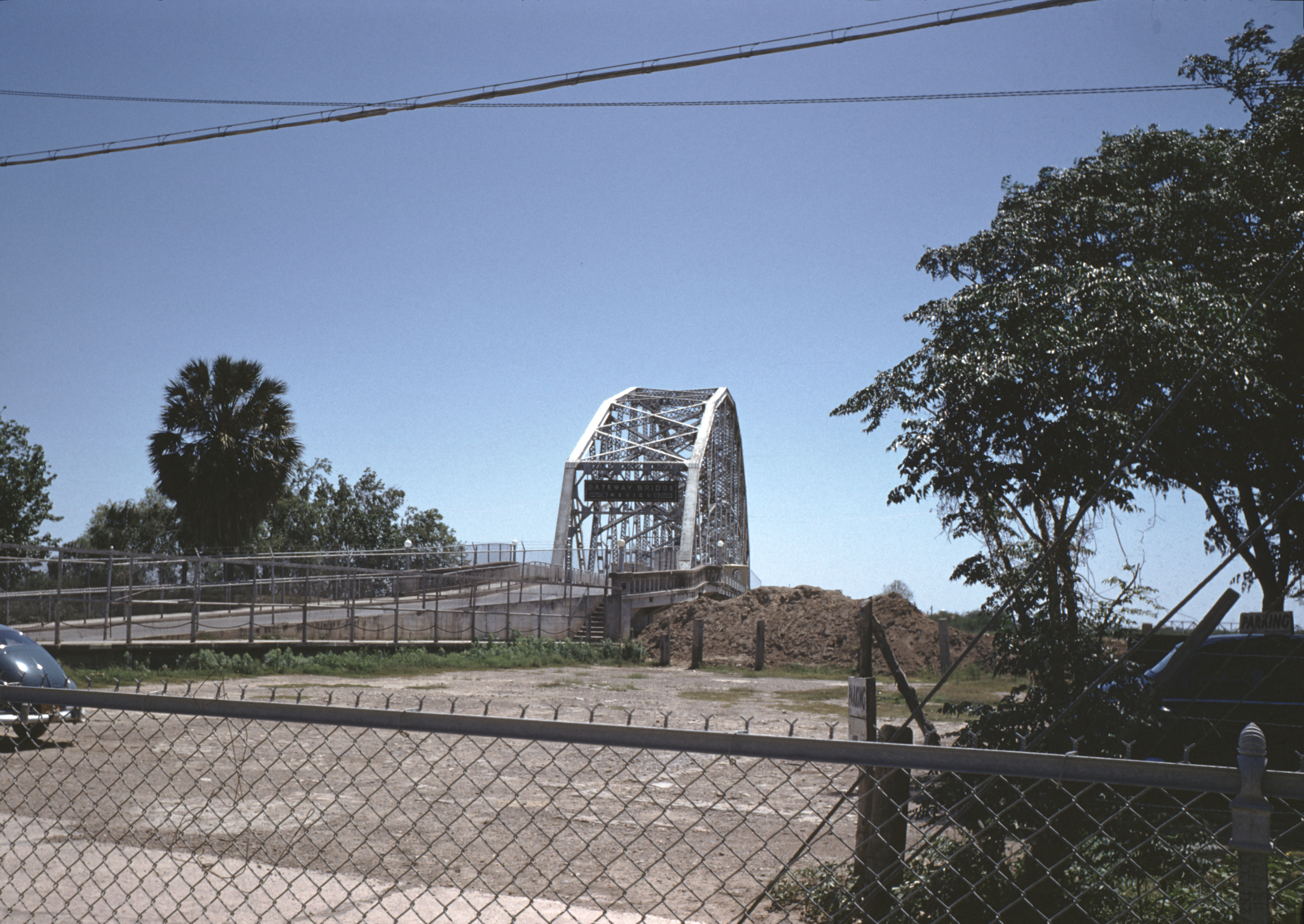
The bridge circa 1950

== Location ==
Gateway is located in Downtown Brownsville and a block from the University of Texas at Brownsville. It is the most used international bridge in the city for pedestrian crossings. People on the US side wanting to go to Mexico can simply park their car on the US side, walk over to Mexico and have access to several tourist attractions in Matamoros. People on the Mexican side are able to walk over to the United States and have access to hundreds of retail outlets in Downtown Brownsville.

Brownsville Urban System, Brownsville's mass transit system, has its central bus station located three blocks from Gateway.

== History ==
The border crossing opened in 1926. The original bridge was a steel arch design, and arches, which have long been used to signify international gateways, were incorporated into the design of the Matamoros Gateway border station in the 1950s. Unfortunately, the steel arch bridge was not well maintained, and it was replaced with two flat deck spans in the late 1970s.

All truck traffic has been prohibited since 1999.

== See also ==
- List of international bridges in North America
