= United States Court House, Custom House, and Post Office (Brownsville, Texas) =

Coordinates: 25.9024°N 97.4992°W

The former United States Court House, Custom House, and Post Office in Brownsville, Texas, also known as the Old Federal Courthouse, is a former courthouse of the United States District Court for the Southern District of Texas, and currently serves as Brownsville City Hall. Completed in 1931, the building replaced the 1892 U.S. Court House, Custom House, and Post Office of that city, which was razed in 1931. The replacement for the 1931 building was, in turn, completed in 1999.

The four-story building is located at 1001 East Elizabeth Street, and still houses an office of the United States Postal Service.

== Gallery ==
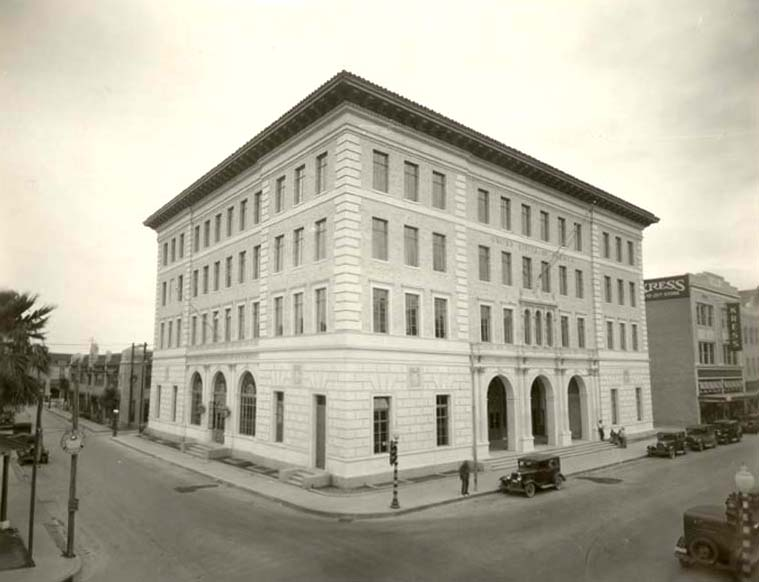
The building as it stood in 1933.

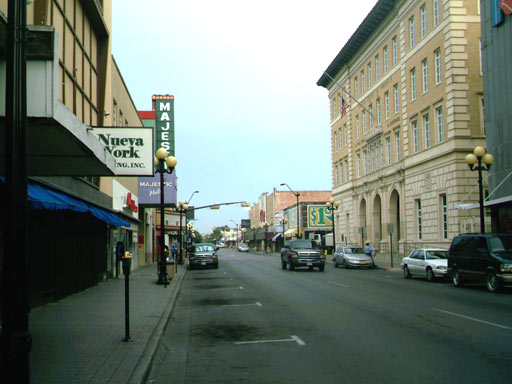
Profile of the building today (right of center).
