= Josie Del Castillo =

American artist (born 1992)

Josie Del Castillo (born 1992) is an American Chicana visual artist, known for her figurative painting. She often paints self portraits that illustrate themes of culture, community and the female form. Her art calls attention to troublesome body standards, while also curating art meant to empower. Alternatively, Del Castillo also highlights her Mexican-American heritage by including cultural symbols and iconography.

== Life and career ==
Josie Del Castillo was born in 1992, in Brownsville,Texas. Being that she grew up in a border town, she was able to experience the culture of both Texas and Mexico. With that, Del Castillo began to authentically capture culture that comes from growing up as a Mexican-American Woman. Del Castillo attended the University of Texas Rio Grande Valley in Edinburg, Texas, where she did her undergraduate studies and received a MFA degree in studio fine arts.

Del Castillo is now a figurative artist who aims to portray her identity through her artwork. Several of Del Castillo’s pieces use nudity to emphasize body positivity. Additionally, many of her work display vulnerability and raise awareness to mental health.

=== Art work ===
Del Castillo's notable piece is titled Don't Touch Me I'm Sensitive, which was created in 2019. In this piece she illustrate her struggles with mental health by depicting herself as a cactus. Don't Touch Me I'm Sensitive was nominated for the AXA award funded by the New York Academy Of Art. Her work was also featured in a traveling gallery that made its way through Chicago, San Francisco, and New York.

Del Castillo is also recognized for her piece named Healing, Learning, And Growing (2020) which was also a part of the AXA nomination. In this piece, she is displayed in the natural female form but includes aloe to symbolize culture and growth.

Community is important to Josie, which is why she created the piece Que Te Valga in 2021. This painting depicts Del Castillo's friend, who is illustrated as a strong woman. The artist has other works that include ordinary people to pay homage to her community.
