= The Hispanic Outlook in Higher Education =

American biweekly magazine

- Categories: Trade magazine
- Frequency: Biweekly
- Founded: 1990
- Country: United States
- Based in: Westwood, New Jersey
- Language: English
- Website: www.hispanicoutlook.com
- ISSN: 1054-2337

The Hispanic Outlook on Higher Education (HO) is an American biweekly magazine that focuses on higher learning for Hispanics. It's notable for its annual Top 100 list of colleges and universities awarding degrees to Hispanic students.

Published biweekly, except in June, July, and August, HO covers events, news, and ongoing trends that affect multicultural institutions of the 21st century.

As of September 2008, HO started posting a selection of articles online. As of December 2011, HO started the digital format of the magazine with free Apps available on iTunes and Google Play. As of June 2013, Hispanic Outlook has kept its presence as a full color digital magazine.

HO is a member of NAHP, NAHJ, NCCHC, ACE and AAHHE.
