= Administrative divisions of Texas =

Texas Counties and municipalities

The U.S. state of Texas has a total of 254 counties, many cities, and numerous special districts, the most common of which is the independent school district.

== County ==
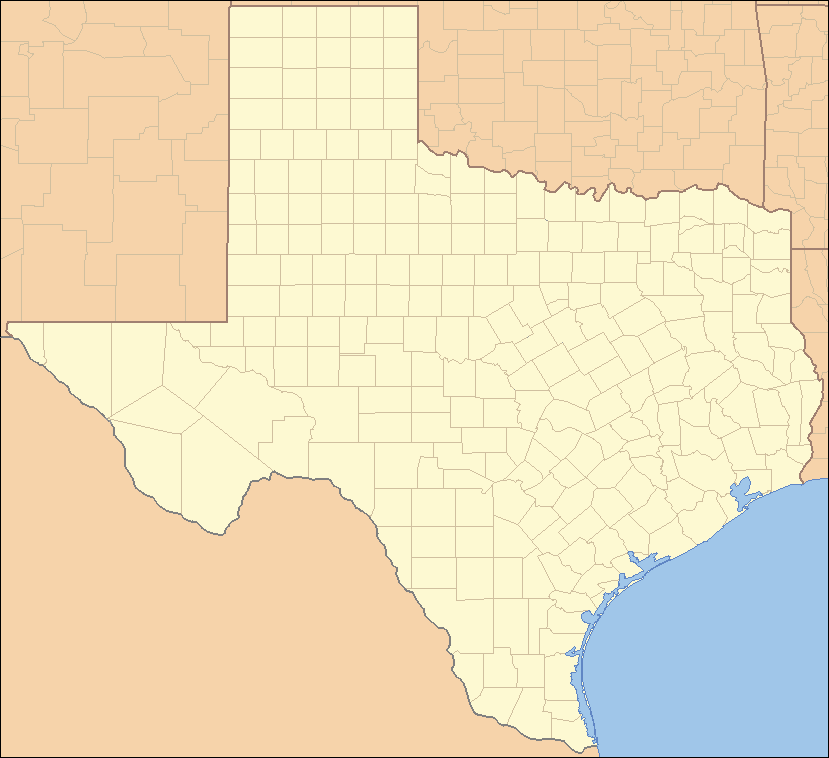

Texas has a total of 254 counties, by far the largest number of counties of any state.

Counties in Texas have limited regulatory (ordinance) authority. Counties also have much less legal power than home rule municipalities. They can only pass ordinances (local laws with penalties for violations) in cases where the Texas statutes have given them express permission to. Counties in Texas do not have zoning power (except for limited instances around some reservoirs, military establishments, historic sites and airports, and in large counties over "communication facility structures": visible antennas). However, counties can collect a small portion of property tax and spend it to provide residents with needed services or to employ the power of eminent domain. Counties also have the power to regulate outdoor lighting near observatories and military bases. Counties do not have "home rule" authority; whatever powers they enjoy are specifically granted by the State.

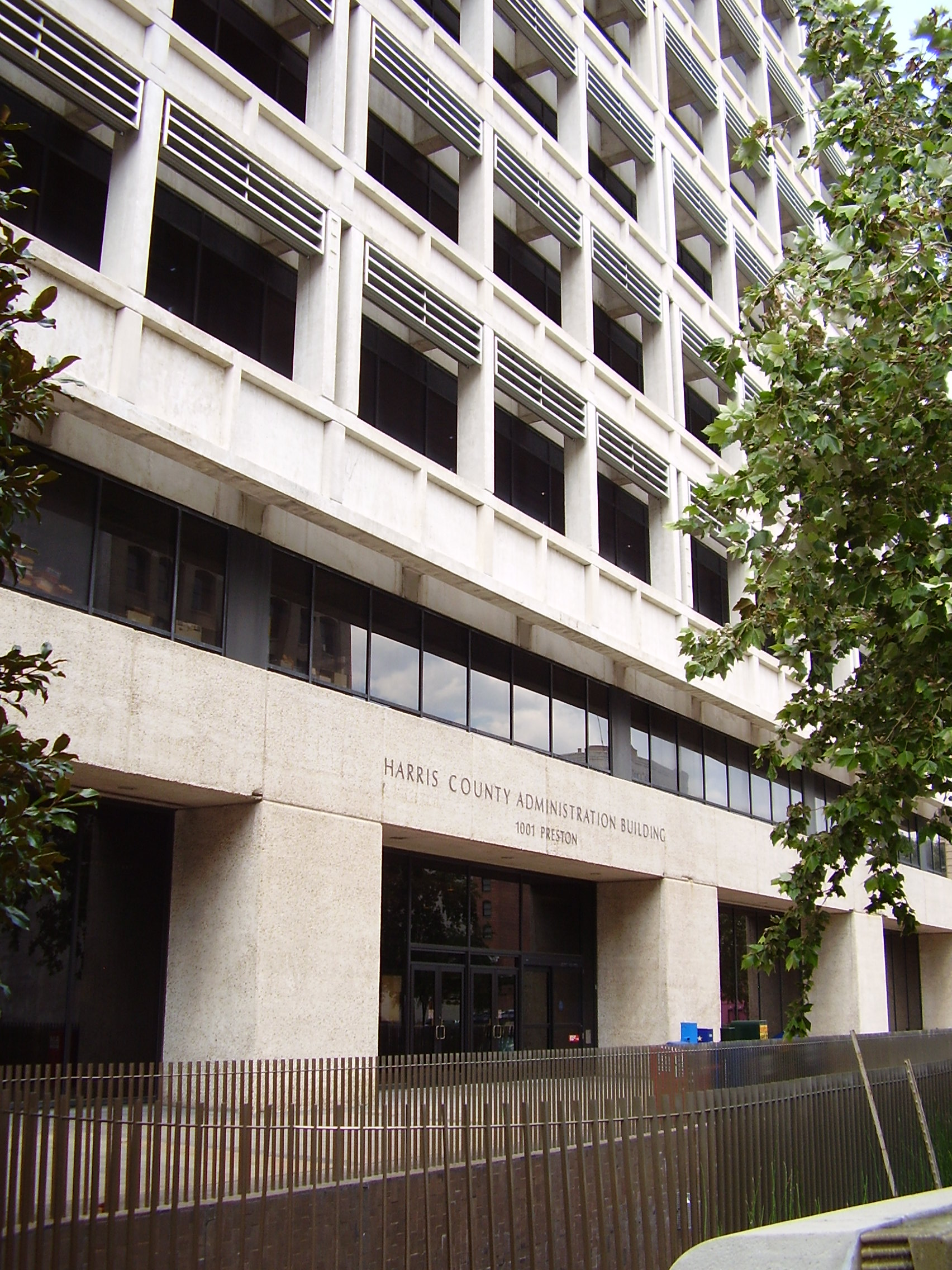
The Harris County Administration Building

Unlike other states, Texas does not allow for consolidated city-county governments. Cities and counties (as well as other political entities) are permitted to enter "interlocal agreements" to share services (for instance, a city and a school district may enter into agreements with the county whereby the county bills for and collects property taxes for the city and school district; thus, only one tax bill is sent instead of three). Texas does allow municipalities to merge, but populous Harris County, Texas consolidating with its primary city, Houston, Texas, to form the nation's second largest city (after New York City) is not a prospect under current law.

As one textbook produced for use in Texas schools has openly acknowledged, Texas counties are prone to inefficient operations and are vulnerable to corruption, for several reasons. First, most of them do not have a merit system but operate on a spoils system, so that many county employees obtain their positions through loyalty to a particular political party and commissioner rather than whether they actually have the skills and experience appropriate to their positions. Second, most counties have not centralized purchasing into a single procurement department which would be able to seek quantity discounts and carefully scrutinize bids and contract awards for unusual patterns. Third, in 90 percent of Texas counties, each commissioner is individually responsible for planning and executing their own road construction and maintenance program for their own precinct, which results in poor coordination and duplicate construction machinery.

=== County government ===
Each county is run by a five-member Commissioners Court consisting of four commissioners elected from single-member districts (called commissioner precincts) headed by a county judge elected at-large. The county judge is equivalent to a county executive in several states. The judge typically votes along with the commissioners (being the tie-breaker in close calls). In smaller counties, the county judge actually does perform judicial duties, but in larger counties the judge's role is limited to serving on the commissioners court and certifying elections. Certain officials, such as the sheriff and tax collector, are elected separately by the voters, but the commissioners court determines their office budgets, and sets overall county policy. Many counties in Texas have administrators but they primarily act in a treasurer role. All county elections are partisan, and commissioner precincts are redistricted after each ten year Census both to equalize the voting power in each and in consideration of the political party preferences of the voters in each.

In most instances, a simple majority of court members is sufficient to take action. Three voting members of the court constitute a quorum. The commissioners court operates similar to the "weak" mayor-council system; the county judge has no veto power over the court and votes along with the other commissioners.

Counties are constitutional subdivisions of the state. As a principal institution of county government, the court's role combines elements of judicial, legislative, and executive functions. Other institutions of county government include independent elected and appointed officials, such as the sheriff, and independent boards, such as the board of judges. The Commissioners Courts in Texas are served and provided continued education by the County Judges and Commissioners Association events and the official association publication County Progress.

In Texas, the relationship between institutions of county government is designed to be independent and adversarial. In this framework, the principal power of the court is the power of the purse. Each year, the court adopts the county tax rate and the county budget, setting the salary and budget for independent elected officials, as well as outlining expenditures for departments under the direct control of the court. As the administrative head of county government, the court has the authority to enact county-wide policies, and to the extent provided by law, to enact legislation in the form of court orders. The court also exercises varying degrees of oversight over subsidiary county boards and commissioners, which may differ from county to county, but which commonly include drainage districts, irrigation districts, housing authorities and the like. In some instances, the court may also serve as the board of directors for these special districts or authorities, as well as fulfill the role of county school board.

Each voting member of the court has one vote. The county judge serves as the presiding officer of the commissioners court, while the county clerk is charged with keeping the minutes of the court, and attesting any actions it make take. State law requires, except in cases of emergency, that an agenda of the items to be considered by the court be posted at least 72 hours prior to its meeting. Among counties, the process for placing items on the agenda, and posting it, varies widely, with the task most often falling to the county judge, the county clerk, or a specially appointed court clerk.

Each of the four county commissioners represents an area of the county, or precinct, that is designed to be roughly equal in population to each of the other such areas. In addition to serving as voting members of the court, county commissioners are often charged with overseeing county roads and bridges within their precinct, and are sometimes also responsible for solid waste collection, parks and other services within the precinct. In rural counties, the role of the county commissioner outside of the commissioners court tends to be quite substantial, while in urban counties, the delivery of county services is frequently consolidated in county-wide departments, with the bulk of a commissioner's time being devoted to the commissioners court. The commissioners are elected to staggered, four-year terms, with two taking office every other year, and are elected by the votes of the precinct represented.

Additionally, state law provides that the court must designate its term, or the time, place, and interval at which it will sit, at the beginning of each fiscal year. Any meeting not held according to the term is considered a special meeting. Legal precedent also provides that no action taken by the court may bind the county beyond the term of the court.

In addition to their roles on the court, the county judge, county commissioners and county clerk each have independent roles to play within county government.

==== County judge ====
The county judge serves as the chief administrator of the county, and as the presiding judge for justice and county courts. In some counties, the county judge exercises judicial functions as a probate and/or county court judge. Even in cases where county judges do not conduct judicial functions, they retain the power to conduct marriages and may also be called upon to conduct administrative hearings, such as those pertaining to liquor license applications.

Additionally, the county judge is a statutory member of several important boards, including the juvenile board and the county election commission. Finally, the judge is designated by a long-standing executive order of the governor, pursuant to the Texas Disaster Act of 1974, as the executive officer for civil defense within the county. The county judge is elected county wide to a four-year term coinciding with the term of the governor.

==== County clerk ====
The county clerk is responsible for recording legal instruments, including birth certificates, marriage licenses, deeds and titles, and for keeping the records of county and justice courts. The county clerk is also a statutory member of certain boards and commissions, such as the elections commission, and may also serve in other capacities as provided by law or local practice. They are elected county-wide to a four-year term.

== Municipal ==
Texas does not have townships; areas within a county are either incorporated or unincorporated. Incorporated areas are part of a city, though the city may contract with the county for needed services. Unincorporated areas are not part of a city; in these areas the county has authority for law enforcement and road maintenance. Their local ordinances, rules, and police regulations are usually codified in a "code of ordinances".

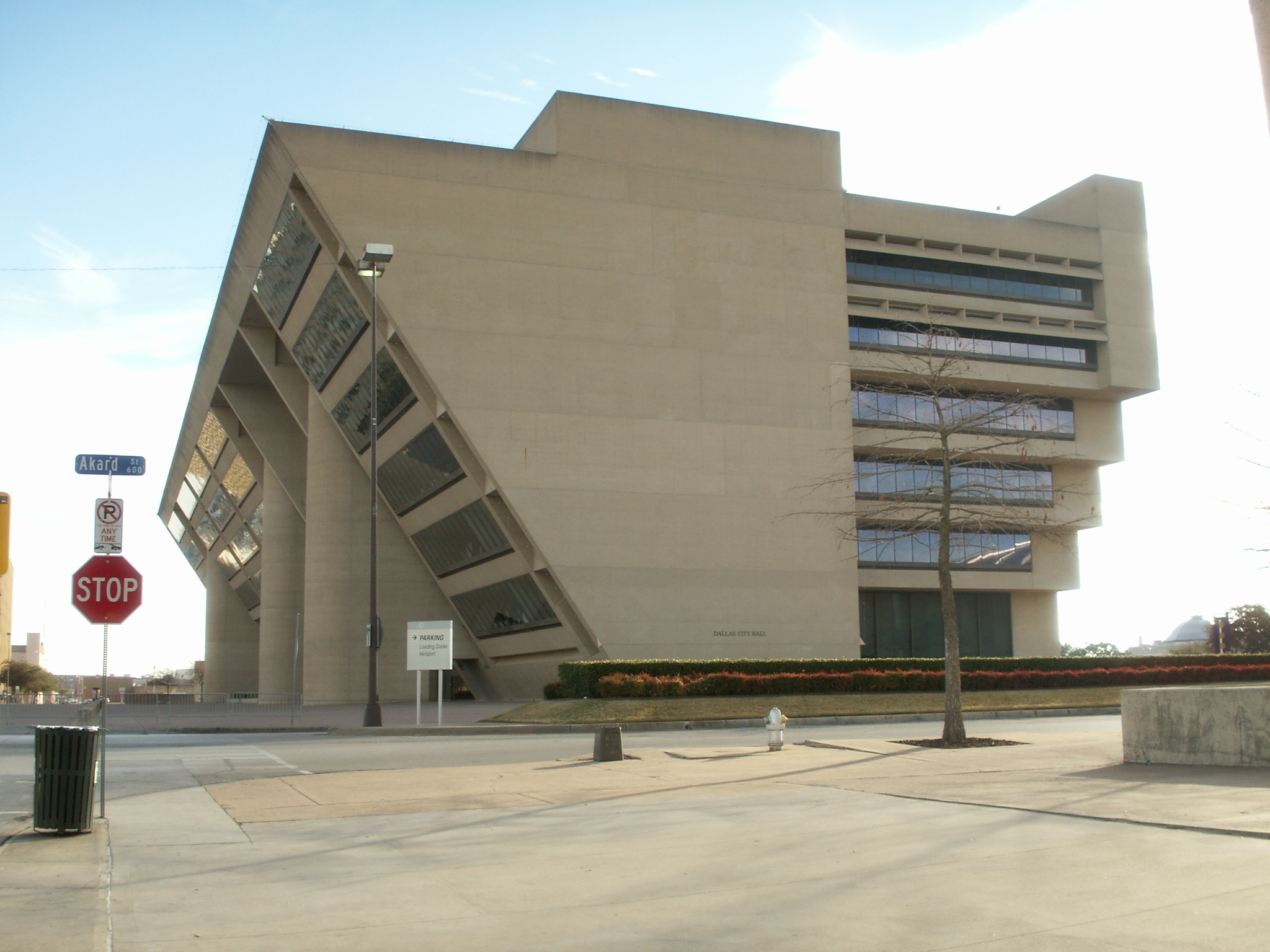
Dallas City Hall

=== City charters ===
Cities are classified as either "general law" or "home rule". A city may elect home rule status (i.e., draft an independent city charter) once it exceeds 5,000 population and the voters agree to home rule; however, the charter cannot conflict with either the state Constitution or the general laws of the state. Otherwise, the municipality is classified as general law and has only those very limited powers specified in the general laws. One example of the difference in the two structures regards annexation. General law cities cannot annex adjacent unincorporated areas without the property owners' consent; home rule cities may annex without consent but must provide essential services within a specified period of time (generally within three years) or the property owner may file suit to be disannexed and reimbursed. Once a city adopts home rule it may continue to keep this status even if the population later falls below 5,000.

=== Annexation ===
Larger cities (those exceeding 225,000) have a unique authority: that of "limited annexation", whereby an adjoining area may be annexed for purposes of imposing city ordinances related to safety and building codes. The residents can vote for mayor and council races but cannot vote in bond elections (and, consequently, the city cannot directly collect city sales tax from businesses or city property tax from owners).

However, the City of Houston has exploited a glitch in the state law that allows it to share in sales tax revenues along with special districts (municipal utility districts, for instance) that cross an area "annexed for limited purposes." This has led to a spiderwebbing known as limited purpose or special purpose annexations that consist of mostly commercial properties facing major streets. These extend through otherwise unincorporated areas. It has also led to conflicts between city and county officials over the provision of services to these areas not included in the agreements.

The purpose of limited annexation is to allow the city to control development in an area that it eventually will fully annex; it is meant to do so within three years (though it can arrange "non-annexation agreements" with local property owners), and those agreements with municipal utility districts also cloud the picture. During each of the three years, the city is to develop land use planning for the area (zoning, for example), identify needed capital improvements and ongoing projects, and identify the financing for such as well as to provide essential municipal services.

=== Municipal elections ===
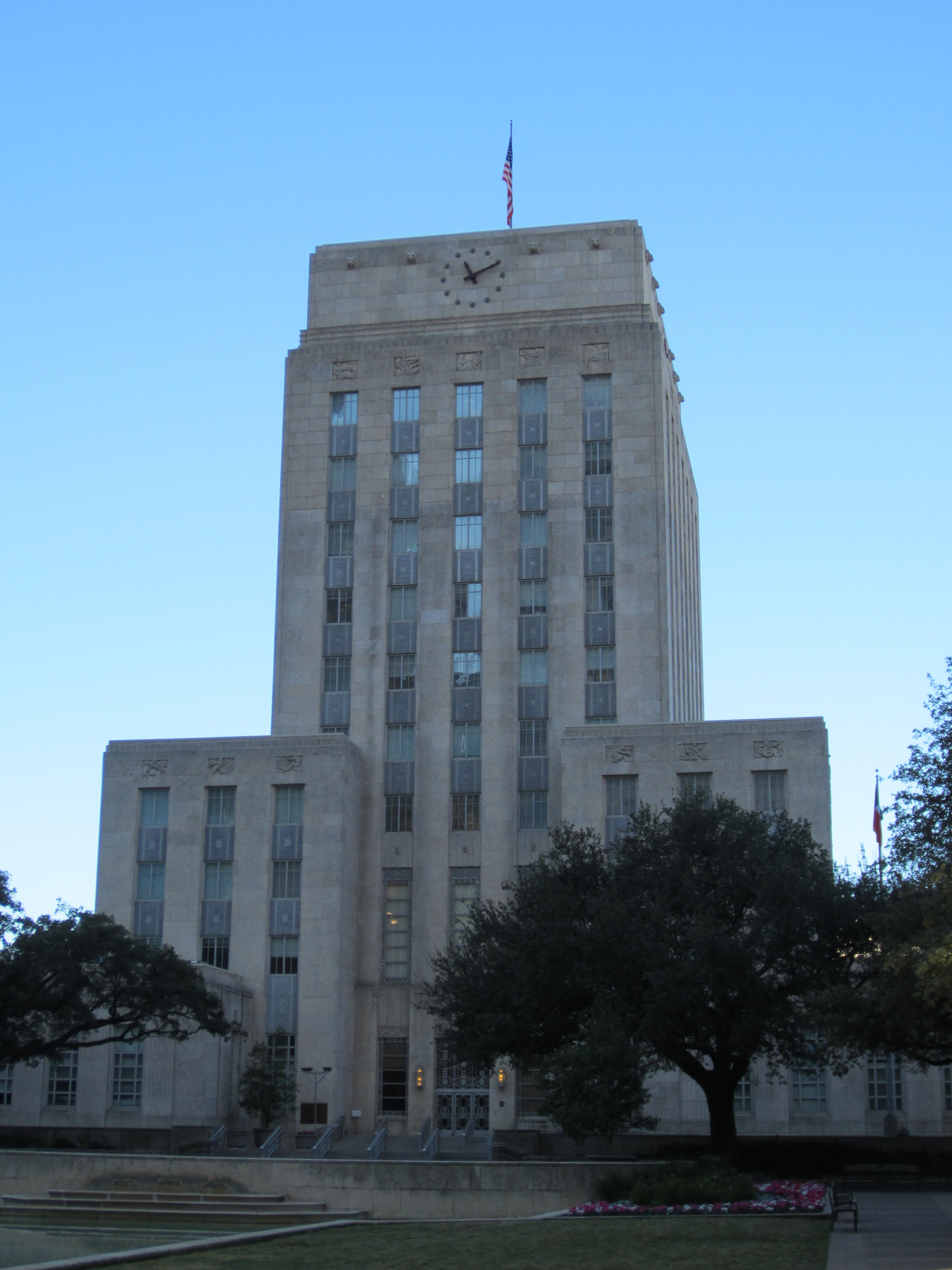
Houston City Hall

Municipal elections in Texas are nonpartisan in the sense that candidates do not appear on the ballot on party lines, and do not run as party tickets. However, a candidate's party affiliation is usually known or can be discerned with minimal effort (as the candidate most likely has supported other candidates on partisan tickets). In some instances, an informal citizen's group will support a slate of candidates that it desires to see elected (often in opposition to an incumbent group with which it disagreed on an issue). However, each candidate must be voted on individually.

== Special districts ==
In addition to cities and counties, Texas has numerous special districts. The most common is the independent school district. Special districts include Groundwater Conservation Districts (regulatory agencies), river authorities, port authorities, water supply districts (for irrigation or municipal supply), public hospitals, road districts and community college districts.

=== School districts ===
Independent school districts have a board of trustees that is independent of any other governing authority, with the exception of the Stafford Municipal School District. School district boundaries are not generally aligned with city or county boundaries; it is common for a school district to cover one or more counties or for a large city to be served by several school districts.

As with municipal elections in Texas, board members or trustees are elected on a nonpartisan basis or may be appointed.

The Texas Education Agency governs public education in Texas.
