= Brownsville Public Utilities Board =

- Type: Municipally owned utility
- Industry: Electric, water and wastewater utility
- Founded: 1960
- Headquarters: Brownsville, Texas
- Area served: Brownsville area
- Website: www.bpub.com

The Brownsville Public Utilities Board, or Brownsville PUB (BPUB), is a municipally owned utility that provides electric, water and wastewater service in and around Brownsville, Texas. It is a component unit of the City of Brownsville. Its board has seven members: six appointed by the City Commission to four-year terms, and the mayor, who serves ex officio.

== History ==
In 1907 Brownsville voters approved a $70,000 bond issue to build a waterworks and an electric light plant, and the city built its electric and water utility the next year. The Public Utilities Board was created in 1960, after residents voted for a city charter amendment setting it up. BPUB bought an 18% share of the Oklaunion Power Plant near Vernon, Texas, in 1986 and 21% of the gas-fired Hidalgo Energy Center in Edinburg, Texas, in 1999. Oklaunion was decommissioned in 2020.

In April 2025 BPUB began replacing about 52,000 electric meters and 58,000 water meters with smart meters, a $29.7 million project expected to be finished by March 2027.

== Electric system ==
BPUB owns and operates one power plant, the Silas Ray Power Plant in west Brownsville, and owns 21% of the Hidalgo Energy Center. It also buys power from the 78 MW Sendero wind farm and from AEP under purchase agreements, and buys and sells power in the ERCOT wholesale market. Silas Ray runs on natural gas and has an estimated capacity of 115 MW, and BPUB's share of the Hidalgo plant entitles it to 105 MW. As a municipally owned utility, BPUB is outside Texas's deregulated retail electric market.

In fiscal year 2025 the electric system served about 54,486 customers and had a peak load of 332 MW. It had 332 miles of transmission lines, 4,504 miles of distribution lines and 15 substations.

== Water and wastewater ==
BPUB takes raw water from the Rio Grande and treats it at two plants with a combined capacity of 40 million gallons per day. It also owns 92.91% of a reverse osmosis plant built with the Southmost Regional Water Authority. It is the only certified water provider within the city limits, and it also sells treated water wholesale to three other water distributors. Wastewater goes to one of two treatment plants, the Robindale Plant and the South Plant.

In August 2026, as part of an agreement under which the city removed 444 acres near Starbase from its city limits, SpaceX agreed to contribute up to $220 million for regional water projects, paid into escrow as an initial $40 million followed by six quarterly payments of $30 million. The money is earmarked for BPUB's Water Renewal Project, which will treat wastewater for reuse as drinking water, and for the optimization and expansion of the Southmost Regional Water Authority plant. Together, the two projects could add about 18 million gallons per day of capacity. BPUB keeps control of the water supply, and SpaceX gets no ownership of the infrastructure and no extra water allocation. By November 2026, $70 million had been deposited in escrow.
