= Free Trade International Bridge =

Free Trade International Bridge Los Indios-Lucio Blanco Bridge
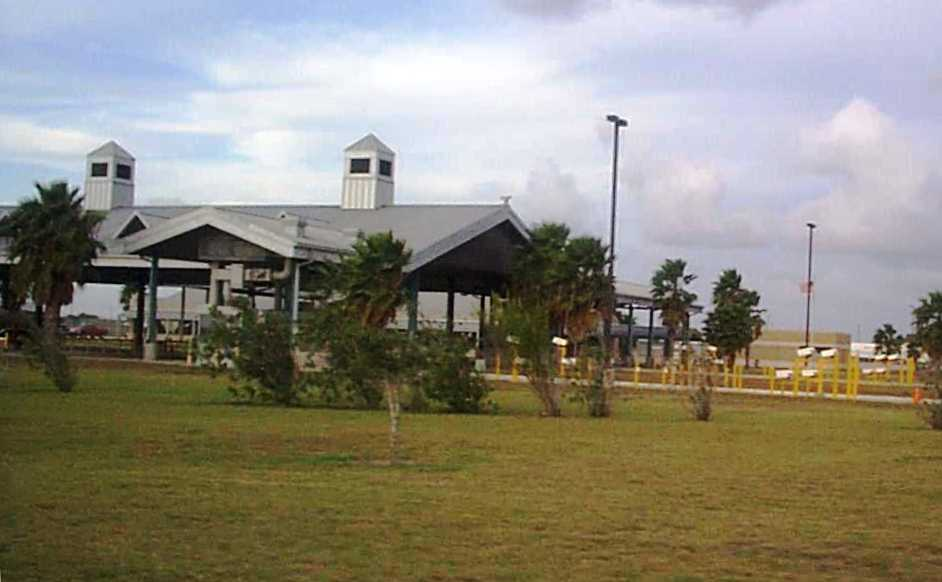
- Coordinates: 26°01′45″N 97°44′20″W
- Crosses: Rio Grande
- Locale: Los Indios, Texas
- Official name: Puente Lucio Blanco-Los Indios
- Other name: Puente Internacional Libre Comercio
- Owner: Cameron County
- Maintained by: Cameron County
- Website: www.cbp.gov/contact/ports/brownsvillelos-indios

Characteristics
- Total length: 503 feet
- Width: 4 lanes

History
- Construction end: 1992
- Opened: 1992

Location
- Interactive map of Free Trade International Bridge

The Free Trade International Bridge is an international bridge which crosses the Rio Grande connecting the United States-Mexico border cities of Los Indios, Texas and Matamoros, Tamaulipas. The bridge is also known as "Los Indios-Lucio Blanco Bridge", "Puente Lucio Blanco-Los Indios", "Puente Internacional Libre Comercio" and "Los Indios Free Trade Bridge".

== Description ==
The Free Trade International Bridge is currently owned and managed by Cameron County. The bridge was completed and opened in 1992. It is four lanes wide and 503 feet (153 m) long.

== Border crossing ==
The Los Indios Port of Entry opened in 1992 with the completion of the Free Trade International Bridge in 1992. The crossing handles both passenger vehicles and commercial trucks. Because of the length of the bridge and the rural location, there are very few pedestrians.

For many years, Los Indios was the sole port of entry for transmigrantes transporting goods from the United States to Latin America.

== See also ==
- List of international bridges in North America
