= XHRIO-TDT =

Television station in Matamoros, Tamaulipas (1979–2021)

- Matamoros, Tamaulipas (Note: Main facility located in McAllen, Texas.); Mexico
- Channels: Digital: 26 (UHF); Virtual: 15
- Branding: CW 15 Rio Grande Valley

Programming
- Language: English
- Affiliations: Telemundo (1988–1999); Fox (2002–2012); MundoFox/MundoMax (2012–2016); The CW (2016–2021)

Ownership
- Owner: Televisora Alco, S. de R.L. de C.V. (98%); (TVNorte, S. de R.L. de C.V.)
- Operator: Entravision Communications (40% owner of Televisora Alco)
- Sister stations: KNVO, KMBH-LD, KTFV-CD, KCWT-CD, KXFX-CD

History
- First air date: January 12, 1979
- Last air date: December 31, 2021
- Former call signs: XHRIO-TV (1979–2001; 2005–2015); XHHUPN-TV (2001–2005)
- Former channel numbers: Analog: 2 (VHF, 1979–2015); Virtual: 2 (2010–2016)
- Call sign meaning: Rio Grande Valley

Technical information
- Licensing authority: IFT
- Facility ID: 704902
- ERP: 250 kW
- HAAT: 317 m (1,040 ft)
- Transmitter coordinates: 25°56′28″N 97°50′49″W

XHRIO-TDT (channel 15) was a television station in Matamoros, Tamaulipas, Mexico, which served the Rio Grande Valley area in southern Texas, United States. The station was 98% owned by Mexican-based Televisora Alco, which was 40% owned by station operator Entravision Communications; XHRIO was a sister station to Entravision's duopoly of McAllen-licensed Univision affiliate KNVO (channel 48) and Harlingen-licensed Fox affiliate KFXV (channel 60), as well as three low-power stations, all licensed to McAllen: Class A UniMás affiliate KTFV-CD (channel 32), KMBH-LD (channel 67, and its Brownsville-licensed translator Class A KXFX-CD), and KCWT-CD (channel 21, also a CW Plus affiliate). XHRIO-TDT maintained its basic concession-compliant studios in Matamoros, with a second studio facility across the border (shared with Entravision's other stations) on North Jackson Road in McAllen housing master control and other internal operations. XHRIO-TDT's transmitter was located near El Control, Tamaulipas.

The station was long linked to programming from the United States, signing on as an independent station programmed from McAllen and serving as an affiliate of Telemundo, UPN, Fox, MundoFox/MundoMax, and The CW in its operational history. In 2019, Entravision announced that it had elected not to pay the 20-year renewal fee for the station's concession to broadcast beyond December 31, 2021, when the station ceased operations.

== History ==
=== Early years ===
The concession for channel 2 was awarded in 1964, receiving the call sign of XHCR-TV and owned by Cadena Radiotelevisora del Norte, S.A. de C.V., a company owned by respected broadcaster Clemente Serna Alvear of Mexico City. In 1973, the name of the concessionaire was changed to Televisoras del Bajo Bravo, S.A.

In 1977, a joint venture was formed between the owners of KRIO (910 AM) in McAllen and KRIX (99.5 FM; now KKPS) in Brownsville and Serna Alvear. The venture brought channel 2 to the air on January 12, 1979 as XHRIO-TV (with call sign authorized on March 16 of that year), an English-language independent station. It branded as "XRIO", running primarily reruns of older American shows and recent feature films. The studios were co-located in McAllen with KRIO. The transmitter was eight miles (13 km) south of the Rio Grande and the Harlingen antenna farm. Since XHRIO-TV was perceived by its American competitors (KRGV-TV and KGBT-TV) as a "border blaster" or pirate station, both being unfounded, they set about to block live delivery of programming across the U.S. border.

=== First stint as XHRIO-TV ===
Although XHRIO-TV had a broadcast signal superior to its U.S. counterparts, it suffered from serious underfunding and mismanagement by the ownership of the studio facility. During its first year, the technical staff which had created the facility against incredible odds slowly departed. Power to the transmitter site was sporadic and replacement technical people were not up to the task. Thus, XHRIO-TV was never able to establish an advertising base in the English market, despite extremely successful initial ratings. In 1981, the owners of the Mexican concession ended the delivery of programming tapes across the border to the channel 2 transmitter and converted XHRIO to a Spanish-language independent station aimed at Matamoros viewers.

In November 1988, the station became the Lower Rio Grande Valley's Telemundo affiliate. The concessionaire became known as Telegrande, S.A. XHRIO's Telemundo affiliation ended on May 1, 1999, due to low ratings (in part because TCI had dropped the station from its lineup in 1997); as a result, the station reverted to English-language programming by becoming a UPN affiliate. Prior to XHRIO joining UPN, the network's programming was seen in the area through secondary affiliations with KRGV-TV (channel 5) and KVEO (channel 23). Telemundo programming returned to the market that August, when KTLM (channel 40) went on the air. To reflect its affiliation, the station changed its callsign to XHHUPN-TV in 2001. In 2005, the station reverted to the XHRIO-TV calls and dropped UPN for Fox.

=== As a Fox affiliate ===
XHRIO station logo during its time as a Fox affiliate; used until early 2012.

Fox programming had previously been seen on XHFOX-TV (channel 17) from September 1994 until February 2002, when station owner Televisa dumped the Fox affiliation and flipped that channel to a XEW-TV repeater as XHTAM-TV. Prior to XHFOX's arrival and before XHRIO took Fox, Lower Rio Grande viewers on the American side received the network from the nationwide Foxnet channel.

In 2007, XHRIO began broadcasting digitally on sister station KNVO's subchannel 48.3, but three years later, after KNVO began airing Univision in HD, XHRIO moved to its own digital channel 2.1.

In 2011, low-powered sister station KSFE-LD began airing a simulcast of XHRIO on its main channel 67.1, with KSFE's previous CW programming being moved to 67.2. In early 2012, KSFE's calls were changed to KFXV-LD and on-air identification heavily emphasized the new call letters as well as channel 67.1. This could potentially lead to confusion as the station was branding itself as channel 2 while identifying itself as channel 67. Although the station was available on both channels, the XHRIO calls were reduced to small print beneath the KFXV calls on station identifications.

=== 2012–2021 ===
In 2012, it was announced that a full power, Entravision-owned station in the Rio Grande Valley would become a charter affiliate of the new Spanish-language network MundoFox. This caused speculation that the Fox network would be removed from XHRIO in favor of MundoFox, although there was no confirmation. On August 7, 2012, Fox programming was interrupted so that XHRIO could air what they labeled a "señal de prueba" or "test signal" feed of MundoFox on 2.1. After numerous unconfirmed rumors that MundoFox would be on 2.1, Valley residents were finally given confirmation on August 8, 2012, when the station's official Twitter feed announced that XHRIO would join MundoFox and Fox would remain on KFXV-LD, effectively splitting them off into two separate and distinctive channels. On August 13, 2012, MundoFox was launched on XHRIO, effectively ending their affiliation with the Fox network. Less than a week after dropping the Fox affiliation from channel 2 altogether, KFXV's standard definition feed was re-added to XHRIO on channel 2.2.

On October 1, 2016, XHRIO switched from MundoMax to The CW, an affiliation held by Entravision and already aired on KCWT-CD. MundoMax shut down entirely on November 30, 2016.

After San Diego sister station XHDTV-TDT switched from MyNetworkTV to Milenio Television in September 2018, XHRIO became the only Mexican-licensed, English-language station serving an American audience.

In releasing its third-quarter 2019 earnings, Entravision announced that it had elected not to pay the 20-year lump sum renewal for XHRIO's concession; the station left the air at the expiration of its concession on December 31, 2021.

== News operation ==
When XHRIO debuted in 1979, the station produced hourly bilingual news briefs with KRIO newscasters Fred Cantu and Rod Santa Ana during evening programming.

A full local newscast would not air on the station until March 12, 2007, when XHRIO debuted Fox 2 News at Nine. The 30-minute newscast airs Monday through Friday at 9 p.m. It was not the first 9 p.m. newscast in the area, as XHFOX produced one while it was a Fox affiliate. Like many other Fox affiliates, XHRIO takes advantage of the network's shorter primetime schedule by scheduling their newscasts an hour before the other local affiliates in the region. In addition to local/national news, weather and sports, Fox 2 News also included "Around the World in 80 Seconds", an 80-second segment dedicated to international, health, and entertainment news. XHRIO's newscast line-up is somewhat similar to that of sister station KNVO's Spanish language newscasts since both stations share the same facility.

On September 27, 2010, XHRIO began broadcasting its local newscasts in high definition.

XHRIO's newscast migrated to KFXV in 2012. No local news aired on the station as a MundoMax or CW affiliate.

== Technical information ==
=== Subchannel ===
Subchannel of XHRIO-TDT
Subchannel	Res.	Short name	Programming
15.1	720p	XHRIO	The CW Plus

Because it is licensed in Mexico, XHRIO was not subject to the United States' discontinuation of analog television and instead shut off its analog signal on January 14, 2015, along with other television stations in the Matamoros-Reynosa and Nuevo Laredo markets. In June 2010, KNVO began broadcasting Univision in HD, and XHRIO began broadcasting on digital channel 26, initially using virtual channel 2 by way of PSIP.

The October 2016 shuffle of Mexican virtual channels required XHRIO to vacate channel 2 for national use by the Las Estrellas network and XHTAM-TDT. The IFT initially assigned virtual channel 54, formerly in use by XHVTV-TDT, as its replacement. Instead, XHRIO moved from virtual channel 2 to virtual channel 15 and did so ahead of the Mexican switch of virtual channels, coinciding with its CW affiliation switch. Also around this time, despite obtaining IFT authorization, the Fox feed was removed; TVNorte did not surrender its multiprogramming authorization until May 2020.

== Carriage issues ==
Because XHRIO was licensed and broadcast from Mexico, it was not covered under U.S. "must-carry" regulations from the Federal Communications Commission (FCC) (though its carriage was mandatory for Mexican cable systems in its broadcast area). This meant that, apart from low-powered affiliates in the U.S., XHRIO was the only Fox affiliate that local cable systems were not required to carry. However, U.S. cable systems were effectively required to carry XHRIO anyway, since it was operated by Entravision, which owns stations on the American side of the border. The same must-carry rules gave full-power American stations the option of "retransmission consent", or requesting compensation from cable systems to carry their station. In this case, Entravision had the right to require cable systems to offer XHRIO as part of the compensation for carrying KNVO.

On September 27, 2006, DirecTV added XHRIO to its lineup in the Rio Grande Valley market on channel 2; prior to that date, DirecTV viewers in that market received Fox programming from Corpus Christi's K47DF. On November 6, 2008, DirecTV added XHRIO's HD channel to its local HD line-up in the Valley.

On September 14, 2007, Time Warner Cable added XHRIO-TDT to its HD service on digital cable channel 870.

In spring 2009, Dish Network added XHRIO's HD feed to its local channel line-up in the Valley on channel 2.

After XHRIO and KFXV were split into two separate channels, all three feeds mentioned above remained KFXV feeds and continued to air Fox programming. It was never clear when or if XHRIO would be added to local cable systems.
