= KMBH =

KMBH may refer to:

- KMBH-LD, a television station (channel 20, virtual 67) licensed to McAllen, Texas, United States
- KFXV (TV), a television station (channel 16, virtual 60) licensed to Harlingen, Texas, United States, which used the call sign KMBH from 1984 until 2020
- KJJF, a radio station (88.9 FM) licensed to Harlingen, Texas, United States, which used the call sign KMBH-FM from 1991 until 2015
