= KMBH-CD =

Television station in McAllen, Texas

- McAllen, Texas; United States
- Channels: Digital: 23 (UHF); Virtual: 21
- Branding: PBS Rio Grande Valley

Programming
- Affiliations: 21.1/.4: PBS

Ownership
- Owner: Entravision Communications; (Entravision Holdings, LLC)
- Sister stations: KNVO; KMHB-LD; KTFV-CD; KFXV

History
- Founded: August 11, 1997
- First air date: May 21, 1998
- Former call signs: K30FF (1997–2000); KFTN-LP/CA (2000–2012); KCWT-CA (2012–2014); KCWT-CD (2014–2026)
- Former channel numbers: Analog: 30 (UHF, 1998–2014)
- Former affiliations: Spanish independent (1998–2002); Telefutura (via KXFX-CD and KTFV-CD, 2002–2011); The CW (2011–2026)
- Call sign meaning: The CW Texas (former affiliation)

Technical information
- Licensing authority: FCC
- Facility ID: 40058
- ERP: 5 kW
- HAAT: 266.8 m (875 ft)
- Transmitter coordinates: 26°8′28″N 97°50′4″W

Links
- Public license information: Public file; LMS

KMBH-CD (channel 21) is a low-power, Class A television station licensed to McAllen, Texas, United States, serving the Lower Rio Grande Valley and carrying non-commercial PBS programming. KMBH-CD is owned by Entravision Communications alongside Harlingen-licensed Fox affiliate KFXV, channel 60 (and translators KMHB-LD and KXFX-CD), McAllen-licensed Univision affiliate KNVO (channel 48), and Class A UniMás affiliate KTFV-CD (channel 32). The stations share studios on North Jackson Road in McAllen, while KMBH-CD's transmitter is located in La Feria, Texas.

Previously, KMBH was a low-power translator of KXFX-CA and KTFV-CA. Entravision held the rights to The CW in the market from 2007 to 2026 on several stations; previous to that, it aired on a cable-only affiliate, "KMHB" (later "Rio Grande Valley's CW").

Unlike other PBS member stations, KMBH-CD holds the distinction of being the sole PBS member station to broadcast under commercial/for-profit ownership.

== History ==
(Formerly call sign of KCWT-CD) brand "Rio Grande Valley CW 21" final logo used from September 1, 2026.

Until 2014, KCWT broadcast on analog channel 30. KCWT launched a digital feed on RF channel 23 that March; however, the station maps to virtual channel 21, as nearby Mexican station XHAB-TDT in Matamoros, Tamaulipas, whose digital broadcasts used RF channel 30, also mapped to virtual channel 30 rather than its analog channel 7 (it now uses virtual channel 8). (Channel 23 was itself unavailable to KCWT as a virtual channel, as it was used in the Rio Grande Valley by KVEO-TV.) Even before then, KCWT, as had previous CW affiliate KSFE-LD (channel 67, now Fox affiliate KMHB-LD), long branded as "CW 21" in reflection of its channel 21 slot on area cable systems.

After sister station XHRIO-TDT (channel 15) ceased operations on December 31, 2021, KCWT became the sole CW Plus affiliate in the Rio Grande Valley.

In 2020, KCWT began carrying PBS's national feed on its fourth digital subchannel. PBS had previously been provided by KMBH-TV (now KFXV) until 2018, when that station's transmitter was damaged in a power surge.

In July 2026, it was reported that The CW Plus would move to KGBT-TV and pulled from KCWT-CD, effective September 1.

== Subchannels ==
The station's signal is multiplexed:

Subchannels of KMBH-CD
Subchannel	Res.	Short name	Programming
21.1	1080i	KCWT-DT	PBS
21.4	1080i	PBS	PBS
