= Channel 67 =

Channel 67 may refer to several television stations:

- Channel67, an internet television station

== Canada ==
The following television stations operate on virtual channel 67 in Canada:

- CHCH-DT-3 in Muskoka, Ontario

== See also ==
- Channel 67 virtual TV stations in the United States
