= KTLM =

Television station in Rio Grande City, Texas

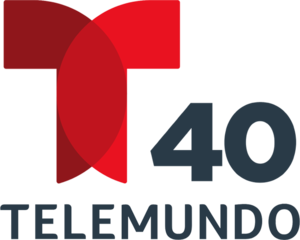
- Rio Grande City–McAllen–; Harlingen–Brownsville, Texas; United States
- City: Rio Grande City, Texas
- Channels: Digital: 14 (UHF); Virtual: 40
- Branding: Telemundo 40

Programming
- Affiliations: 40.1: Telemundo; for others, see § Subchannels

Ownership
- Owner: Telemundo Station Group; (NBC Telemundo License LLC)

History
- Founded: June 10, 1994
- First air date: August 1, 1999
- Former call signs: KAIO (CP, 1994–1998)
- Former channel numbers: Analog: 40 (UHF, 1999–2009); Digital: 40 (UHF, 2009–2020)
- Call sign meaning: Telemundo

Technical information
- Licensing authority: FCC
- Facility ID: 62354
- ERP: 350 kW
- HAAT: 576.4 m (1,891 ft)
- Transmitter coordinates: 26°31′2″N 98°39′8″W
- Translator(s): 22 (UHF) Harlingen; 25 (UHF) Weslaco
- Repeater: 34 (UHF) KSOY-LD McAllen

Links
- Public license information: Public file; LMS
- Website: www.telemundo40.com

KTLM (channel 40) is a television station licensed to Rio Grande City, Texas, United States, broadcasting the Spanish-language Telemundo network to the Lower Rio Grande Valley. Owned and operated by NBCUniversal's Telemundo Station Group, the station maintains studios in the Chase Bank building in McAllen, and its transmitter is located near Rio Grande City.

== History ==
The station's original construction permit was issued to the Starr County Historical Foundation on June 10, 1994, with the call sign KAIO issued on September 1. The foundation intended to run KAIO as a non-commercial station promoting tourism in the Rio Grande Valley; that idea, however, was later abandoned. On October 5, 1998, KAIO changed its call letters to KTLM and picked up the Telemundo affiliation from XHRIO-TV (channel 2), which had struggled with signal strength in the western parts of the Lower Rio Grande Valley. The station went on the air August 1, 1999.

In 2000, the Starr County Historical Foundation sold KTLM to Sunbelt Multimedia, a division of the Starr Camargo Bridge Company, unrelated to Sunbelt Communications Company. Sunbelt Multimedia had been managing the station since its launch. On September 10, 2012, Sunbelt Multimedia put KTLM up for sale, with Patrick Communications managing partner Larry Patrick named to run the station while in receivership. Documents were forwarded to the FCC to officially put the station under Patrick's control. His media worked to try to earn enough money to repay creditors of Sunbelt Multimedia. A year later, a deal was reached to sell KTLM to Telemundo Rio Grande Valley LLC, a subsidiary of NBCUniversal; this made the station a Telemundo owned-and-operated station. The sale was finalized on December 31.

== News operation ==
News logo

KTLM launched a news department in 2003, with weeknight newscasts at 5 and 10 p.m. originally anchored by Yolanda de la Cruz. In 2010, Dalia Garza was promoted from health reporter to the main anchor.

After NBC's purchase, local news was expanded to include the latest weekend news, a 9 a.m. morning show named Buenos Días Frontera, an in-house weather forecast with two new weather presenters, and a new public affairs program named Enfoque McAllen. On September 2, 2014, KTLM debuted a new anchor team. This team included a co-anchor for Dalia Garza and a new weather anchor to replace Marlen Sosa, who had left two months earlier with Elizabeth Robaina. An updated set named Noticias Telemundo 40 was inaugurated at the same time. On November 3, 2014, along with 14 other stations owned by NBC Universal and Telemundo, KTLM launched a new 4:30 p.m. newscast, moving Al Rojo Vivo to 3 p.m. and Lo Mejor de Caso Cerrado to a half-hour slot at 4 p.m. This allowed room for an extended newscast running from 4:30 to 5 p.m. On May 26, 2016, the station launched a consumer investigative unit called "Telemundo Responde". This was led by anchor and reporter Ana Cecilia Méndez, who took this new role in place of her previous weekend anchor position.

=== Notable former on-air staff ===
- Daniel Tuccio – Anchored morning briefs during Un Nuevo Día and was a general assignment reporter for the weekday evening newscast.

== Technical information ==
=== Subchannels ===
The station's signal is multiplexed:

Subchannels of KTLM
Subchannel	Res.	Short name	Programming
40.1	1080i	KTLM-HD	Telemundo
40.2	480i	TeleXIT	TeleXitos
40.3	480i	Cozi	Cozi TV
40.4	480i	KTLM-LX	NBC True CRMZ
40.5	480i	Oxygen	Oxygen
40.6	480i	COZI	Cozi TV

On August 8, 2018, KTLM added a third subchannel carrying Cozi TV programming, which moved from KFXV.

=== Analog-to-digital conversion ===
KTLM ended regular programming on its analog signal, over UHF channel 40, on June 12, 2009, the official date on which full-power television stations in the United States transitioned from analog to digital broadcasts under federal mandate.

As part of the SAFER Act, KTLM kept its analog signal on the air until July 12 to inform viewers of the digital television transition through a loop of public service announcements from the National Association of Broadcasters.
