= Daniel Tuccio =

Daniel Tuccio is a Peruvian-American television reporter/news anchor. He was born in Anaheim, California and grew up in Lima, Peru.

He started his career as a production assistant in Panamericana Television in Lima in 1998. He worked for soccer show Futbol Grande, which showed history soccer matches including those of the Peru national team in World Cups and Copa America.

He moved to Los Angeles to pursue his career in journalism. In 2002 he was correspondent for Gold Cup in Pasadena, CA for Peruvian website Peru.com. He then moved to radio where he worked for Super Estrella Network and Super Estrella Los Angeles.

He landed his news reporting job at KPMR, the Univision affiliate in Santa Barbara, CA. He had the opportunity to cover presidential candidate John McCain's visit to the Central Coast. He then moved back to Lima where he worked as general assignment reporter for Frecuencia Latina. He covered many stories from social, crime, consumer and politics. He interviewed many personalities of the Peruvian spectrum like President Alan Garcia, former President Alejandro Toledo, Keiko Fujimori, singer/author Gianmarco, folklor artists Chato Grados and Abencia Mesa.

He returned to California as main anchor of Noticias Univision Costa Central in Santa Barbara. He also performed duties of image producer of the newscast. While Daniel Tuccio was anchor, ratings rose three times.

He continued his journalism career at KCEC, Univision affiliate in Denver, CO. He works as general assignment/feature reporter for Noticias Univision Colorado Solo a las Diez. He reports the most interesting stories that affect the Hispanic community in Colorado. His stories have been featured several times in the CNN Newsource. For a short time late 2014/2015 he worked at KTLM in charge for doing morning news briefs and was a general assignment reporter for the 4:30pm and 5:00pm weekday newscast. in June 2015 he became a producer at KDEN-TV returning to denver to produce the station weekday 4:30,5pm,10pm newscast. KCEC where he worked at is KDEN-TV rival since the station launched newscast in 2011.
