= Channel 2 branded TV stations in the United States =

The following television stations in the United States brand as channel 2 (though neither using virtual channel 2 nor broadcasting on physical RF channel 2):

- KALB-DT2 in Alexandria, Louisiana
- KMBH-LD in McAllen, Texas
- KPSP-CD in Cathedral City, California
- KYUU-LD in Boise, Idaho
- WBBH-TV in Fort Myers, Florida
- WENY-DT3 in Elmira, New York
- WTOK-DT2 in Meridian, Mississippi

The following television stations in the United States formerly branded as channel 2:

- KDLH-DT2 in Duluth, Minnesota
- KDLH in Duluth, Minnesota
- KRII-DT2 in Chisholm, Minnesota
