= Channel 21 branded TV stations in the United States =

The following television stations in the United States brand as channel 21 (though neither using virtual channel 21 nor broadcasting on physical RF channel 21):

This table is sorted ascending by call sign; click on any of the arrows to change how the table is sorted.

Call sign	City	State
KMBH-LD	McAllen	Texas
