= KNVO (TV) =

Television station in McAllen, Texas

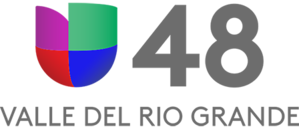
- McAllen–Harlingen–Brownsville, Texas; United States
- City: McAllen, Texas
- Channels: Digital: 17 (UHF); Virtual: 48
- Branding: Univision 48 Valle del Rio Grande (general); Noticias Valle del Rio Grande (newscasts)

Programming
- Affiliations: 48.1: Univision; 48.2: UniMás; for others, see § Subchannels

Ownership
- Owner: Entravision Communications; (Entravision Holdings, LLC)
- Sister stations: TV: KFXV; KMBH-CD; KMHB-LD; KTFV-CD; Radio: KFRQ; KKPS; KNVO-FM; KVLY

History
- First air date: October 12, 1992
- Former call signs: KNVO (1989–1991); KMZS (1991–1992)
- Former channel numbers: Analog: 48 (UHF, 1992–2009); Digital: 49 (UHF, until 2020)
- Call sign meaning: "K" (Que) Nuevo (Spanish for "how new")

Technical information
- Licensing authority: FCC
- Facility ID: 69692
- ERP: 1,000 kW
- HAAT: 285.6 m (937 ft)
- Transmitter coordinates: 26°5′19″N 98°3′45″W

Links
- Public license information: Public file; LMS
- Website: noticias48knvo.com

KNVO (channel 48) is a television station licensed to McAllen, Texas, United States, serving the Lower Rio Grande Valley as an affiliate of the Spanish-language network Univision. It is owned by Entravision Communications alongside Fox affiliate KFXV, channel 60 (and translators KMHB-LD and KXFX-CD), PBS member station KMBH-CD (channel 21), and Class A UniMás affiliate KTFV-CD (channel 32). The stations share studios on North Jackson Road in McAllen; KNVO's transmitter is located on Farm to Market Road 493 near Donna, Texas.

== History ==
The Federal Communications Commission (FCC) granted an original construction permit on October 9, 1983, to build a television station licensed in McAllen. Originally, the station was approved to broadcast on UHF channel 48 with 4,071 kW effective radiated power, but was later changed to 3,162 kW on April 16, 1992. The station made its debut on October 12, 1992. During the station's first years on the air, KNVO quickly became the highest-rated station in the market.

In 1996, LS Broadcasting, Ltd., Mundo Vision Broadcasting Company and Larry Safir sold KNVO to Entravision Communications for $24.8 million. The sale was completed on January 24, 1997.

On October 11, 2001, the FCC granted a permit to construct the station's digital facilities (requested in 1999). The station completed construction of its full-power digital facilities in June 2006, and was granted a license on June 26, 2007.

== News operation ==
The station's former news logo.

KNVO's newscast debuted in 1999. The station presently broadcasts seven hours of locally produced newscasts each week (with one hour each on weekdays, Saturdays and Sundays). In September 2010, KNVO started broadcasting local news in high definition.

As of 2012, KNVO was the second highest-rated newscast in the market, behind ABC affiliate KRGV-TV (channel 5).

In early December 2015, Entravision canceled the morning newscasts at all of its stations in the United States, including KNVO's Alegre Despertar.

== Technical information ==
=== Subchannels ===
The station's signal is multiplexed:

Subchannels of KNVO
Subchannel	Res.	Short name	Programming
48.1	1080i	Univisn	Univision
48.2	480i	UniMas	UniMás (KTFV-CD)
48.3	480i	LATV	LATV
48.4	480i	ION	Ion

Simulcast of subchannels of another station

=== Analog-to-digital conversion ===
KNVO shut down its analog signal, over UHF channel 48, on June 12, 2009, the official date on which full-power television stations in the United States transitioned from analog to digital broadcasts under federal mandate. The station's digital signal remained on its pre-transition UHF channel 49, using virtual channel 48.
