= KFXV (TV) =

Television station in Harlingen, Texas

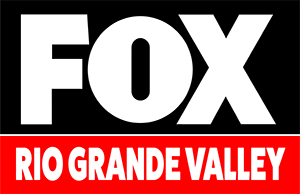
- Harlingen–McAllen–Brownsville, Texas; United States
- City: Harlingen, Texas
- Channels: Digital: 16 (UHF); Virtual: 60
- Branding: Fox Rio Grande Valley

Programming
- Affiliations: 60.1: Fox; 60.3: Bounce TV

Ownership
- Owner: Entravision Communications; (Entravision Holdings, LLC)
- Sister stations: TV: KNVO, KMBH-CD, KMHB-LD, KTFV-CD; Radio: KFRQ, KKPS, KNVO-FM, KVLY

History
- First air date: May 5, 1982
- Former call signs: KZLN (1979–June 1984); KEDV (June–October 1984); KMBH (October 1984–2020)
- Former channel numbers: Analog: 60 (UHF, 1982–2009); Digital: 38 (UHF, 2003–2020); Virtual: 38 (2003–2020)
- Former affiliations: PBS (1982–1983, 1985–2016); Dark (1983–1985, January–July 2018, 2019–January 2020); Cozi TV (2016–2018); Independent/RTV Música/Teleritmo (August 2018–2019, January–May 2020); MyNetworkTV (secondary, May 2020–2021)
- Call sign meaning: Fox Valley

Technical information
- Licensing authority: FCC
- Facility ID: 56079
- ERP: 618 kW
- HAAT: 345.5 m (1,134 ft)
- Transmitter coordinates: 26°7′15″N 97°49′19″W
- Translator(s): KMHB-LD 67.1 McAllen; KXFX-CD 67.1 Brownsville

Links
- Public license information: Public file; LMS
- Website: foxrgv.tv

KFXV (channel 60) is a television station licensed to Harlingen, Texas, United States, serving as the Fox affiliate for the Lower Rio Grande Valley. It is owned by Entravision Communications alongside McAllen-licensed Univision affiliate KNVO (channel 48), PBS member station KMBH-CD (channel 21), and Class A UniMás affiliate KTFV-CD (channel 32). The stations share studios on North Jackson Road in McAllen; KFXV's transmitter is located near La Feria, Texas.

Prior to being a Fox affiliate, KFXV had been the PBS member station for the Lower Rio Grande Valley as KZLN from 1982 to 1983 and KMBH, owned by the Roman Catholic Diocese of Brownsville, between 1985 and 2014. As a result of a historical quirk, it was built on a channel not reserved for noncommercial use and thus could be sold and become a commercial station. It has operated as a commercial outlet since 2014. The station returned to the air in May 2020, assuming the Fox affiliation from two low-power TV stations also owned by Entravision: McAllen-licensed KMBH-LD and Brownsville-licensed KXFX-CD (channel 67), which today operate as translators of KFXV.

== History ==
=== KZLN ===
On April 20, 1977, the Texas Consumer Education and Communications Development Committee (TCECDC), related to the Roman Catholic Diocese of Brownsville, filed an application to build a new television station on non-commercially reserved channel 44 in Harlingen; however, in October, TCECDC modified its application to specify channel 60—thus becoming a non-commercial station operating on a non-reserved commercial channel. The Federal Communications Commission (FCC) granted the committee a construction permit on January 24, 1979. The call letters KZLN were assigned that June for the new educational television outlet. Original plans called for the station to be on the air by December 1979 with a bilingual program schedule; however, opposition from Harlingen officials brought those plans to a halt. One Harlingen city commissioner sympathetic to the project told the Hispanic group to "get some Browns, Joneses, and Smiths on that board of directors"; another high-ranking official anonymously told John Bloom of Texas Monthly that they were afraid of KZLN being a "Chicano-type propaganda station".

KZLN would also be beset by several years of delays in tower construction and facilities. The station shared its transmitter facility with another new station in the Rio Grande Valley, KVEO-TV, whose owner contributed $96,000. By the time KZLN began telecasting on May 5, 1982, the climate was poor for PBS due to major cutbacks by the Reagan administration that affected funding for public broadcasting. For cable viewers in the Valley, KZLN replaced KEDT of Corpus Christi.

As had been feared at launch, KZLN's road was rocky. In September, more than $150,000 of equipment was stolen and taken to Mexico, from where it was dispersed to Arkansas, California, and elsewhere; the thieves would be arrested in Cancún in 1983, and some of the equipment was recovered. By December, the station's fundraising appeals warned, "Without your help, KZLN will not be able to continue to operate". In February 1983, the station managed to stay on the air thanks to a reprieve from the Central Power and Light Co. (CPL), the local electric utility; at the time, channel 60 owed CPL more than $19,000, had just avoided a full staff walkout, and had its telephone service disconnected for nonpayment. The station made it to its first birthday, in large part under interim leadership and with station driving force Francisco Briones having resigned.

Poor community support, however, prevented KZLN from continuing much further. With only 400 memberships and no local programming, the station ceased operating July 13, 1983.

=== Becoming KMBH ===
When KZLN folded, the diocese, by way of RGV Educational Broadcasting, Inc., stepped in to acquire the channel 60 license in a transaction approved by the FCC in December 1983. The diocese assumed a $36,000 tax liability and $15,000 in outstanding wages and forgave $356,000 in debt.

RGV Educational Broadcasting changed the call letters to KEDV; in August, the diocese announced a $1.2 million pledge to cover the start-up expenses for a new facility, to be located on diocesan land south of the Valley Baptist Medical Center in Harlingen, as well as a new tower at La Feria. At the time, a May 1985 start-up date was projected, though KEDV—which soon would take on its KMBH call letters after receiving a request from KEDT—got off to a slow start in fundraising. Channel 60 returned to the air, this time as KMBH, on October 8, 1985.

KMBH produced a limited amount of local programming in its years as a PBS station. In the early 1990s, it produced Valley Football Week, a local high school football roundtable program. Most of the shows it produced were of a religious orientation, including a Spanish-language Bible study and the Sunday Mass.

In its later years, RGV Educational Broadcasting's practices came under scrutiny on multiple fronts. In November 2007, the management of KMBH demanded that Bruce Lee Smith, a reporter for Harlingen's Valley Morning Star and a former volunteer for KMBH in the 1990s, reveal his confidential sources, in exchange for the station's financial records that he requested. The station would later file a police report, citing that Smith was abusive to its secretary when he requested the records, a charge that Smith denied. KMBH would soon run hourly announcements on its radio and TV stations, questioning Smith's ethics. In August 2008, Raymundo Joseph Peña, the Bishop of Brownsville, removed three of the seven KMBH board members without comment; the bishop was the sole member of RGV Educational Broadcasting, allowing him sole discretion to appoint or dismiss board members. The Corporation for Public Broadcasting investigated the station's finances; KMBH had run deficits for four consecutive years and also lacked a community advisory board.

Several programming moves also drew attention. In 2007, the station refused to air in prime time a Frontline documentary, Hand of God, which dealt with sex abuse by clergymen; the station only aired it the next day at 1 a.m., drawing complaints from viewers in support of the program. KMBH was one of just two PBS stations not to air the program in prime time.

KMBH shut down its analog signal, over UHF channel 60, on February 17, 2009, the original target date on which full-power television stations in the United States were to transition from analog to digital broadcasts under federal mandate (which was later pushed back to June 12, 2009). The station's digital signal remained on its pre-transition UHF channel 38.

In 2010, a Frontline documentary on the response to Hurricane Katrina was similarly not aired in prime time because, per the general manager, it contained offensive language.

=== Conversion to commercial operation ===
On January 14, 2014, the Diocese announced its intention to file with the FCC to convert KMBH's license to a commercial license, with the intention to sign a local marketing agreement with, and sell the station to, MBTV Texas Valley LLC; the Diocese cited the expenses of running the station. Though KZLN/KMBH had always operated as non-commercial, public television stations, the 1979 decision to file for channel 60 instead of 44 meant that it operated on a non-reserved channel—unusual among PBS stations—allowing KMBH to be converted. The move raised questions about KMBH's continued operation as a PBS member, though it was stated that efforts would be made to keep PBS programming available in the Rio Grande Valley; KEDT in Corpus Christi also sought a potential purchase of the station. The proceeds from the sale were used to repay nearly $800,000 in grants to the Corporation for Public Broadcasting. Sister station KMBH-FM, later renamed KJJF, was not affected by the sale of KMBH television; the diocese later withdrew the station from National Public Radio (NPR) and sold it to the Relevant Radio Catholic network.

The FCC approved of the switch of KMBH's license to commercial use on February 21, 2014. In March 2014, the $8.5 million sale to MB Revolution LLC (like MBTV Texas Valley, a subsidiary of R Communications) was officially announced and filed with the FCC. MB's owner, Robert Martínez-McCarter, already owns six radio stations in the Rio Grande Valley. The new owners then took control of KMBH through a local marketing agreement; though MB intended to program the station commercially, it remained a PBS station. Programming from the diocese would continue to be produced from the KMBH studios and aired on a digital subchannel for eight hours each month. On May 20, 2015, MB Revolution received FCC approval to buy the station.

Under R Communications, the station used virtual channel 38 instead of 60. By early 2016, KMBH's primary subchannel had switched from PBS to Cozi TV, a national diginet owned by NBCUniversal; PBS programming would move to the second subchannel, while a third subchannel was added with "RTV-Música", a locally programmed Spanish-language music channel. On August 8, 2018, "RTV-Música" was simulcast on both the .1 and .3 subchannels, with Cozi TV programming airing on the third subchannel of KTLM. RTV Música later began airing programming from Teleritmo, a grupera music video channel owned by Multimedios Televisión.

On January 25, 2018, local utility work resulted in a power surge that damaged the KMBH transmitter, causing the station to go off the air. The station returned to air at reduced power in late July; however, efforts to ramp up to full power operation damaged the transmitter again, forcing KMBH off the air on February 11, 2019.

=== Sale to Entravision Communications and change to Fox ===
In August 2019, Entravision Communications, owners of full-power KNVO (channel 48) as well as low-power stations KFXV-LD/KXFX-CD and KCWT-CD in the Valley, announced it would acquire KMBH for $2.9 million. For attribution reasons related to its minority ownership by Univision and certain rights held by the company relating to its Univision affiliates, Entravision declared that KMBH would not air any Univision-owned network. PBS was ultimately added by Entravision to the 21.4 subchannel of KCWT-CD on June 30, 2020, reaching about 80 percent of the households covered by the former KMBH.

KMBH briefly returned to air on January 8, 2020, at reduced power with temporary facilities as it awaited being repacked to channel 16 in phase 8. The facility was reactivated on May 5, simulcasting KFXV-LD/KXFX-CD. Channel 60 then became KFXV on May 27, 2020.

On October 1, 2021, MyNetworkTV (which was carried on KFXV and KMBH as a secondary affiliation) moved to Antenna TV O&O KGBT-TV (channel 4) also as a secondary affiliation.

== Newscasts ==
On March 12, 2007, Entravision debuted Fox 2 News at Nine on XHRIO. The 30-minute 9 p.m. newscast, which airs Monday to Friday, was not the first in the market, as XHFOX had aired one in 2001, the final year of its affiliation, through a partnership with KRGV-TV. KFXV's sister Fox affiliate to the northwest in Laredo, KXOF-CD, carries KFXV's Fox News South Texas newscasts with some Laredo news and weather inserted into the programs.

== Technical information ==
=== Subchannels ===
The station's signal is multiplexed:

Subchannels of KFXV
Subchannel	Res.	Short name	Programming
60.1	720p	KFXV	Fox
60.3	480i	Bounce	Bounce TV

KFXV used its former physical channel 38 as its virtual channel for most of its history telecasting in digital, opting not to remap to virtual channel 60. Under Entravision, KFXV began using virtual channel 60.
