= Channel 23 virtual TV stations in the United States =

The following television stations operate on virtual channel 23 in the United States:

- K05MW-D in Ferndale, Montana
- K07EN-D in Woods Bay/Lakeside, Montana
- K09YT-D in Sula, Montana
- K14LF-D in Willmar, Minnesota
- K14LT-D in Polson, Montana
- K15IY-D in Heron, Montana
- K15KF-D in Coos Bay, Oregon
- K16NF-D in Hot Springs, Montana
- K19GD-D in Kalispell & Lakeside, Montana
- K20CN-D in Fortuna/Rio Dell, California
- K20NF-D in Seattle, Washington
- K21DG-D in St. James, Minnesota
- K21MW-D in Thompson Falls, Montana
- K21OO-D in South Eureka/Loleta, California
- K22MT-D in Idabel, Oklahoma
- K23CU-D in Prineville, Oregon
- K23FH-D in Milton-Freewater, Oregon
- K23FY-D in Frost, Minnesota
- K23GF-D in Dove Creek, etc., Colorado
- K23KO-D in Rural Beaver County, Utah
- K23LB-D in Fargo, North Dakota
- K23LE-D in Sedalia, Missouri
- K23MQ-D in Duluth, Minnesota
- K23NB-D in York, Nebraska
- K23PA-D in Klamath Falls, Oregon
- K23PH-D in Chico, California
- K26CL-D in Alexandria, Minnesota
- K28OD-D in Powers, Oregon
- K28OI-D in Jackson, Minnesota
- K29OH-D in Victoria, Texas
- K30KY-D in Philipsburg, Montana
- K31PD-D in Whitefish, etc., Montana
- K32GX-D in St. James, Minnesota
- K32IG-D in Ellensburg, etc., Washington
- K35JT-D in Drummond, Montana
- K36KR-D in Elmo/Big Arm, Montana
- K36PM-D in Salmon, Idaho
- KAEF-TV in Arcata, California
- KAGS-LD in Bryan, Texas
- KAHO-LD in Woodville, Texas
- KBSI in Cape Girardeau, Missouri
- KBSV in Ceres, California
- KBTU-LD in Salt Lake City, Utah
- KCSD-TV in Sioux Falls, South Dakota
- KCWI-TV in Ames, Iowa
- KDDC-LD in Dodge City, Kansas
- KDEO-LD in Denver, Colorado
- KDGL-LD in Sublette, Kansas
- KDGU-LD in Ulysses, Kansas
- KEOO-LD in Midland, Texas
- KERO-TV in Bakersfield, California
- KEVU-CD in Eugene, Oregon
- KEZT-CD in Sacramento, California
- KGCE-LD in Garden City, Kansas
- KHCE-TV in San Antonio, Texas
- KHME in Rapid City, South Dakota
- KLMB-CD in El Dorado, Arkansas
- KLVD-LD in Las Vegas, Nevada
- KMCB in Coos Bay, Oregon
- KMUV-LD in Monterey, California
- KNAT-TV in Albuquerque, New Mexico
- KNDO in Yakima, Washington
- KOKI-TV in Tulsa, Oklahoma
- KQDA-LD in Denison, Texas
- KQEG-CA in La Crescent, Minnesota
- KRDT-CD in Redding, California
- KRPE-LD in San Diego, California
- KSWE-LD in Liberal, Kansas
- KTMF in Missoula, Montana
- KTVP-LD in Phoenix, Arizona
- KUVN-DT in Garland, Texas
- KVEO-TV in Brownsville, Texas
- W23BV-D in Evansville, Indiana
- W23BW-D in Madison, Wisconsin
- W23EB-D in Cadillac, Michigan
- W32FB-D in Ceiba, Puerto Rico
- W23FH-D in Erie, Pennsylvania
- W23FI-D in Valdosta, Georgia
- W23FJ-D in Jennings, Florida
- W23FL-D in Traverse City, Michigan
- W31FE-D in Savannah, Georgia
- WAAU-LD in Augusta, Georgia
- WATM-TV in Altoona, Pennsylvania
- WAUA-LD in Columbus, Georgia
- WBUI in Decatur, Illinois
- WCVE-TV in Richmond, Virginia
- WCVI-TV in Christiansted, U.S. Virgin Islands
- WDDN-LD in Washington, D.C.
- WDMY-LD in Toledo, Ohio
- WDVB-CD in Edison, New Jersey
- WDWA-LD in Damascus, Virginia
- WELF-TV in Dalton, Georgia
- WHMC in Conway, South Carolina
- WHPM-LD in Hattiesburg, Mississippi
- WIFR-LD in Rockford, Illinois
- WITD-CD in Chesapeake, Virginia
- WJDG-LD in Grundy, Virginia
- WJVF-LD in Jacksonville, Florida
- WKAR-TV in East Lansing, Michigan
- WKZT-TV in Elizabethtown, Kentucky
- WLTV-DT in Miami, Florida
- WMAO-TV in Greenwood, Mississippi
- WMDV-LD in Danville, Virginia
- WNDY-TV in Marion, Indiana
- WNJS in Camden, New Jersey
- WNLO in Buffalo, New York
- WNVT in Goldvein, Virginia
- WPFO in Waterville, Maine
- WQMC-LD in Columbus, Ohio
- WRGX-LD in Dothan, Alabama
- WSRE in Pensacola, Florida
- WTAS-LD in Waukesha, Wisconsin
- WTWV in Memphis, Tennessee
- WUCW in Minneapolis, Minnesota
- WUDT-LD in Detroit, Michigan
- WVPX-TV in Akron, Ohio
- WVUA in Tuscaloosa, Alabama
- WWJX in Jackson, Mississippi
- WWME-CD in Chicago, Illinois
- WXDT-LD in Naples, Florida
- WXWZ-LD in Guayama, Puerto Rico
- WXXA-TV in Albany, New York

The following stations, which are no longer licensed, formerly operated on virtual channel 23:

- K45DS-D in Freshwater, etc., California
- KHMM-CD in Hanford, California
- WIEK-LD in Midland, Michigan
- WIFR in Freeport, Illinois
- WQDU-LD in Albany, Georgia
- WUEB-LD in Rockford, Illinois
- WUOF-LD in Gainesville, Florida
