= KMHB-LD =

Television station in McAllen, Texas

KMHB-LD and KXFX-CD
Translators of KFXV, Harlingen, Texas
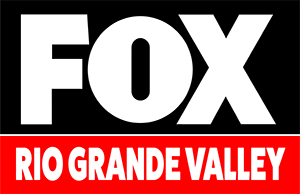

KMHB-LD: McAllen, Texas; KXFX-CD: Brownsville, Texas; United States
- Channels for KMHB-LD: Digital: 20 (UHF); Virtual: 67
- Channels for KXFX-CD: Digital: 20 (UHF); Virtual: 67
- Branding: Fox Rio Grande Valley (general); Fox News South Texas (newscasts)

Programming
- Affiliations: 67.1: Fox

Ownership
- Owner: Entravision Communications; (Entravision Holdings, LLC)
- Sister stations: KFXV; KNVO; KTFV-CD; KMBH-CD

History
- Founded: KMHB-LD: August 14, 1997; KXFX-CD: February 18, 1997
- First air date: KMHB-LD: July 28, 2001; KXFX-CD: January 14, 2002
- Former call signs: KMHB-LD: K67HC (1997–2000); KSFE-LP (2000–2011); KSFE-LD (2011–2012); KFXV-LD (2012–2020); KMBH-LD (2020–2026); KXFX-CD: K20FK (1997–1999); KZAV-LP (1999–2005); KVTF-CA (2005–2012); KXFX-CA (2012–2015)
- Former channel number: KMHB-LD: Analog: 67 (UHF, 2001–2011); KXFX-CD: Analog: 20 (UHF, 1999–2001), 21 (UHF, 2001–2015)
- Former affiliations: KMHB-LD: Azteca América (2001–2007); The CW Plus (2007–2011 on 67.1, 2011–2026 on 67.2); MyNetworkTV (secondary, 2011–2021); KXFX-CD: Telefutura (via KTFV-LP, 2002–2012)
- Call sign meaning: KMHB-LD: McAllen, Brownsville, Harlingen (former call sign of KFXV); KXFX-CD: Texas Fox

Technical information
- Licensing authority: FCC
- Facility ID: KMHB-LD: 49038; KXFX-CD: 32179
- Class: KMHB-LD: LD; KXFX-CD: CD
- ERP: KMHB-LD: 14.18 kW; KXFX-CD: 0.5 kW
- HAAT: KMHB-LD: 215 m (705 ft); KXFX-CD: 141 m (463 ft)
- Transmitter coordinates: KMHB-LD: 26°5′19″N 98°3′45″W; KXFX-CD: 25°57′50.5″N 97°31′13.3″W

Links
- Public license information: KMHB-LD: LMS
- Website: foxrgv.tv

KMHB-LD in McAllen, Texas, and KXFX-CD in Brownsville, Texas, are low-power television stations serving the Lower Rio Grande Valley. They are translators of Harlingen-licensed Fox affiliate KFXV (channel 60) which is owned by Entravision Communications.

KMHB-LD and KXFX-CD both broadcast on physical UHF channel 20 using virtual channel 67, with KXFX operating as a Class A station. KMHB-LD's transmitter is located on Farm to Market Road 493 near Donna, Texas, while KXFX-CD's tower is on McAllen Road in Brownsville; their parent station shares studios with duopoly partner and Univision affiliate KNVO (channel 48) on Jackson Road in McAllen.

From 2012 to 2020, KMHB-LD was known as KFXV-LD; the call letters were moved when Entravision bought and relaunched full-power KMBH as KFXV in May 2020.

== KMHB-LD history ==
=== Before 2012 ===
Formerly known as KSFE-LP, the station became the valley's CW affiliate on August 6, 2007. Despite the fact that it was not carried on Time Warner Cable at the time, it was decided to brand the station as "The CW 21" to reflect the channel's eventual cable slot. For about a year, programming from The CW had been seen on cable-only affiliate "KMHB", which previously served as a WB affiliate from 1998 to 2006. KSFE began broadcasting a digital signal on sister station KNVO's subchannel 48.4 around the same time, enabling much of the Rio Grande Valley to receive The CW over-the-air.

In 2010, KSFE-LP began broadcasting as a low-power digital channel and can be found on RF channel 20, displayed as 67.1. Despite the fact that The CW was the primary affiliate, it was decided, in late 2011, to make the main channel a translator of then-primary Fox-affiliated sister station, XHRIO, with The CW pushed to the second subchannel.

=== Since 2012 ===
In 2012, the call letters were changed to KFXV-LD to better reflect the station's status as a translator of a Fox station. Furthermore, the station began to identify itself by the KFXV calls and channel despite the fact it was still branding itself as channel 2. It was also announced that The CW would henceforth be referred to as KCWT, also a low-power station owned by Entravision, located on analog channel 30. The analog feed of The CW was moved to KCWT, and The CW moved to that station.

Around that time, it was announced that a new Spanish-language network by Fox called MundoFox would be coming to the Rio Grande Valley when it launched in August 2012; reports indicated that a full-power station owned by Entravision would assume the affiliation. While KFXV remained the Fox affiliate, XHRIO broke off and began airing MundoFox programming on August 7, nearly a whole week before MundoFox's scheduled full launch date, XHRIO began airing MundoFox on 2.1 calling it a "test signal". The next day, via Fox Rio 2's Twitter feed, it was officially announced that MundoFox would be coming to XHRIO 2.1 and Fox would remain on KFXV 67.1. Although this switch had already happened unofficially, it officially took place on August 13, 2012, effectively splitting XHRIO and KFXV into two separate and distinct channels, making KFXV 67.1 the official Fox affiliate for the Rio Grande Valley. This also marks the first time in the network's history that the valley's Fox station is of American origin, with an American call sign.

Despite moving the Fox affiliation from channel 2 to 67, the station was not rebranded from its "Fox 2" moniker, making KFXV's primary branding match its location on satellite systems rather than its virtual channel. This was changed in 2016, when the station began branding with its call letters.

On May 27, 2020, KFXV-LD became KMBH-LD. This came after KMBH was bought by Entravision and became a full-power Fox affiliate as KFXV.

On October 1, 2021, MyNetworkTV (which was carried on KFXV and KMBH as a secondary affiliation) moved to Antenna TV O&O KGBT-TV (channel 4) also as a secondary affiliation.

== KXFX-CD history ==
While affiliated with Telefutura, the programming of KXFX-CA (then known as KVTF-CA) was also seen in McAllen on KTFV-CA channel 32, in La Feria on KCWT-CA channel 30, and on the digital signal of KNVO channel 48.2 / 49.2. KTFV and the KNVO subchannel continue to carry what is now UniMás, while KCWT became a CW affiliate.

== News operation ==
KMHB-LD's news operation has migrated over from XHRIO during its time as the Fox affiliate.

When XHRIO debuted in 1979, the station produced hourly bilingual news briefs with KRIO newscasters Fred Cantu and Rod Santa Ana during evening programming.

A full local newscast would not air on the station until March 12, 2007, when XHRIO debuted Fox 2 News at Nine. The 30 minute newscast airs Monday through Friday at 9 p.m. It was not the first 9 p.m. newscast in the area, as XHFOX produced one while it was a Fox affiliate. Like many Fox affiliates, KMHB-LD takes advantage of the network's shorter prime time schedule by scheduling their newscasts an hour before the other local affiliates in the region. In addition to local/national news, weather and sports, Fox 2 News also includes "Around the World in 80 Seconds", an 80-second segment dedicated to International news, health news and entertainment news. KMHB-LD's newscast line-up is somewhat similar to that of sister station KNVO's Spanish language newscasts since both stations share the same facility.

== Subchannels ==
The stations' signals are multiplexed:

Subchannels of KMBH-LD and KXFX-CD
Subchannel	Res.	Short name	Programming
67.1	720p	KMHB-LD	Fox (KFXV)

== See also ==
- Channel 2 branded TV stations in the United States
- Channel 20 digital TV stations in the United States
- Channel 20 low-power TV stations in the United States
- Channel 21 branded TV stations in the United States
- Channel 67 virtual TV stations in the United States
