= KTFV-CD =

Television station in McAllen, Texas

- McAllen, Texas; United States
- City: McAllen, Texas
- Channels: Digital: 32 (UHF); Virtual: 32
- Branding: UniMás Rio Grande Valley

Programming
- Affiliations: 32.1: UniMás

Ownership
- Owner: Entravision Communications; (Entravision Holdings, LLC)
- Sister stations: KFXV; KMBH-CD; KMHB-LD; KNVO

History
- Founded: August 14, 1997
- First air date: January 14, 2002
- Former call signs: 890310SQ (CP); K32ER (1997–2000); KLIA-LP (2000–2006); KTFV-CA (2006–2012)
- Former channel number: Digital: 48 (UHF, until 2020)
- Call sign meaning: Telefutura Rio Grande Valley (referring to previous network name)

Technical information
- Licensing authority: FCC
- Facility ID: 28280
- Class: CD
- ERP: 15 kW
- HAAT: 266.8 m (875 ft)
- Transmitter coordinates: 26°5′19″N 98°3′45″W
- Translator(s): KNVO 48.2 McAllen

Links
- Public license information: Public file; LMS

KTFV-CD (channel 32) is a low-power, Class A television station licensed to McAllen, Texas, United States, serving the Lower Rio Grande Valley as an affiliate of the Spanish-language network UniMás. It is owned by Entravision Communications alongside Univision affiliate KNVO (channel 48), Fox affiliate KFXV, channel 60 (and translators KMHB-LD and KXFX-CD), and PBS member station KMBH-CD (channel 21). The stations share studios on North Jackson Road in McAllen; KTFV-CD's transmitter is located near Scissors, Texas.

== Outline profile ==
After XHRIO dropped the Fox affiliation for MundoFox (later MundoMax), residents of the lower Rio Grande Valley had trouble receiving the new low-power Fox signal. Due to this, it was decided to add a feed of KFXV to the second subchannel of KTFV and display it as 67.1 (same display channel as KFXV) in an attempt to reach a larger audience.

In addition to its own digital signal, KTFV-CD is simulcast in widescreen standard definition on KNVO's second digital subchannel (48.2) from a transmitter on Farm to Market Road 493, near Donna, Texas.

== Subchannel ==
Subchannel of KTFV-CD
Subchannel	Res.	Short name	Programming
32.1	1080i	UniMas	UniMás
