= Channel 67 virtual TV stations in the United States =

The following television stations operate through virtual channel 67 in the United States:

- KFTH-DT in Alvin, Texas
- KMBH-LD in McAllen, Texas
- KSMS-TV in Monterey, California
- KXFX-CD in Brownsville, Texas
- WBBZ-TV in Springville, New York
- WFTY-DT in Smithtown, New York
- WHVD-LD in Huntsville, Alabama
- WMPB in Baltimore, Maryland
- WPXP-TV in Lake Worth, Florida
- WUPX-TV in Richmond, Kentucky

The following television station, which is no longer licensed, formerly operated on virtual channel 67 in the United States:

- K48NY-D in Gainesville, Texas
