= Kenco Group =

Company that provides logistics services

- Type: Private
- Industry: Logistics
- Predecessor: Jane Kennedy Greene; Gary Mayfield
- Founded: 1950 in Chattanooga, Tennessee, United States
- Founder: Jim Kennedy Jr.; Sam Smartt
- Headquarters: Chattanooga, Tennessee, United States
- Area served: North America
- Key people: Denis Reilly (CEO); Jane Kennedy Greene (Chairman; CEO, 1997–2017); David Caines (Chief Operating Officer)
- Services: Fleet Management; Supply Chain Management; Transportation Services; Material Handling
- Revenue: US$626 million
- Number of employees: 5,000 (2016)
- Website: kencogroup.com

Kenco Group, or Kenco, is a privately held Chattanooga, Tennessee, United States–based company that provides logistics services. Kenco specializes in distribution and fulfillment, transportation management, material handling services, and warehouse real estate management. The company is known for being the largest woman-owned third party logistics company in the United States.

== History ==
Kenco Group traces its origins to Cherokee Warehouses, Inc., founded in Chattanooga, Tennessee, in 1950 by Jim Kennedy Jr. and Sam Smartt Sr. In 1961, the company expanded into material handling services through the establishment of a forklift dealership.

In 1966, Jim Kennedy Jr. developed one of the industry's first dedicated contract warehousing agreements, marking the formal establishment of Kenco's contract warehousing business. During the 1970s, the company expanded throughout the United States and became a national logistics provider.

In 1987, Kenco developed a proprietary warehouse execution system (WES) to support warehouse operations and automation.

In 1999, Cherokee Warehouses and Kenco merged operations, combining the companies' warehousing and logistics capabilities.

Kenco launched Fleet Management Services in 2010, expanding its transportation and equipment management offerings.

In 2011, Jane Kennedy Greene became chairwoman and majority owner of the company, making Kenco the largest woman-owned third-party logistics provider in the United States.

Kenco established its Innovation Lab in 2015 to collaborate with customers on researching and testing emerging supply chain technologies. In 2019, the company expanded the lab into a 10,000-square-foot testing facility at its Chattanooga headquarters.

In 2020, Kenco launched DaVinci AI, an artificial intelligence and advanced analytics platform designed to support supply chain planning, labor forecasting, and operational visibility.

In 2022, Kenco established a Life Sciences division focused on logistics solutions for healthcare and pharmaceutical customers. The same year, Pritzker Private Capital acquired the company.

In 2024, Kenco acquired The Shippers Group, expanding its warehouse network and contract packaging capabilities across North America.

In 2025, Kenco acquired the third-party logistics business of Drexel Industries, expanding its Canadian operations. The company also launched a dedicated contract packaging division.

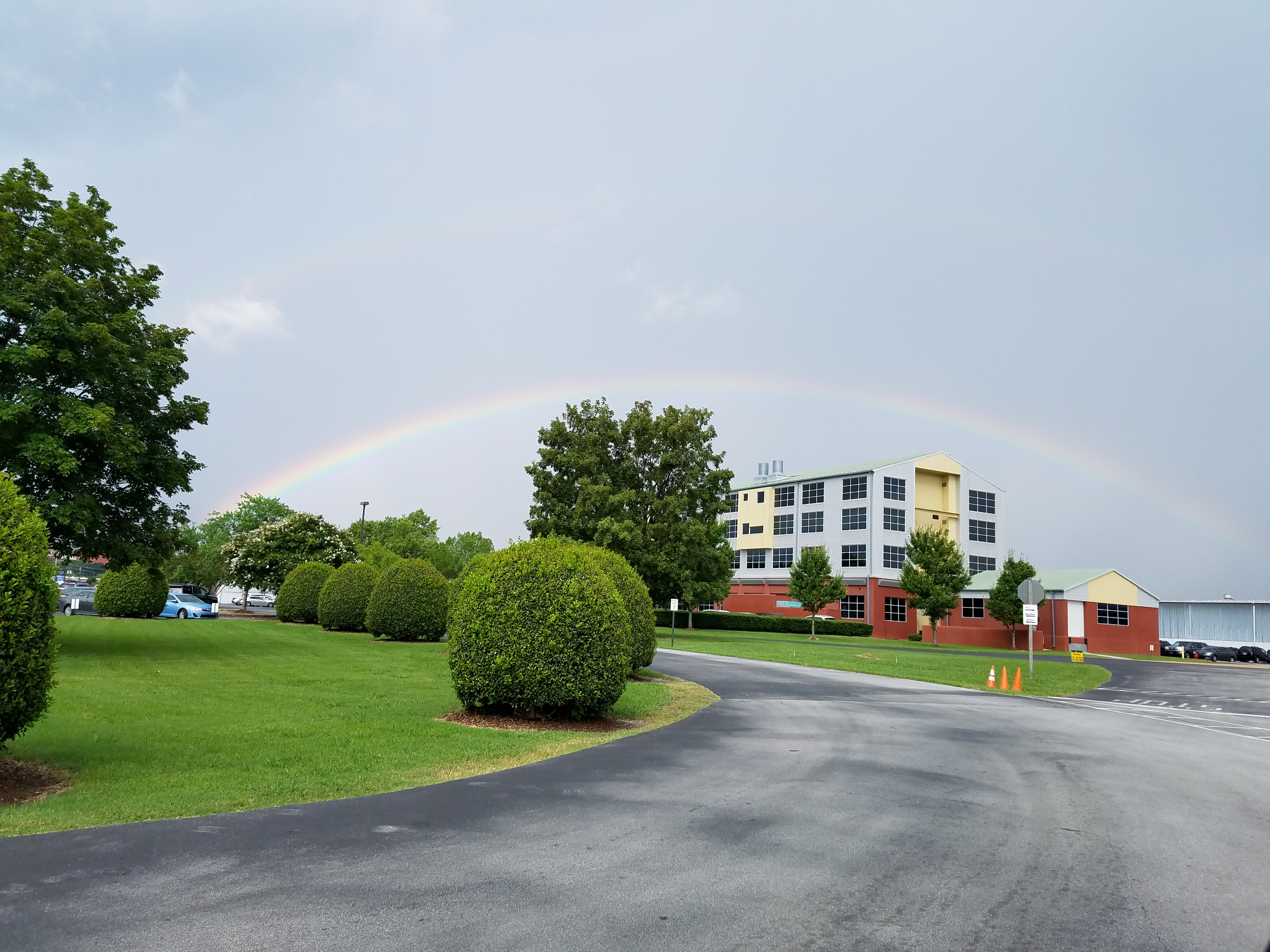
Kenco's Chattanooga Headquarters at Rivermill

== Business ==
Kenco also provides value-added services, including network optimization, sequencing, raw materials management, product testing, vendor-managed inventory, and regulated pharmaceutical destruction. Kenco is certified as a woman-owned business under the WBENC.

Kenco is divided into 5 areas of business:

=== Kenco Management Services ===
Kenco Management Services provides an audit structure for all programs across the Kenco family of companies. It focuses on 6 key functional areas: Safety, Quality Management, Engineering, Human Resources, Information Technology, and Finance.

=== Kenco Logistics Services ===
Kenco Logistics Services is Kenco's largest business segment. It provides distribution and fulfillment services for supply chain operations. In 2016 Kenco was ranked by Armstrong & Associates as a Top 50 U.S Third-Party Logistics Provider.

=== Kenco Transportation Services ===
Kenco Transportation consists of dedicated and asset-based fleets for LTL (Less-than-Truckload) and TL (Full Truckload). Services also include transportation management system software, freight brokerage, carrier selection, audit, and regulatory services. Kenco was ranked No. 26 in Transport Topics Top 50 List in 2017 and manages more than $100 million in transportation revenue.

=== Kenco Material Handling Solutions ===
Originally established as a forklift dealership, Kenco's Material Handling Solutions division now sells material handling equipment from three regional dealerships across the United States. The material handling division also provides technicians for repairs and maintenance. Fleet management provides MHE data and service ticket auditing. As of 2017, Kenco Material Handling Solutions managed $300 million in MHE assets.

=== JDK Real Estate ===
Kenco's real estate segment provides services for business looking to procure warehousing facilities.

== Innovation Lab ==
The Innovation Lab at Kenco was founded in 2015 to identify, research, and prototype ideas and processes. It has worked with vendors, customers, and entrepreneurs from a number of industries to assist customers with logistics issues. In late 2016, Kenco announced its partnership with Locatible, a location tracking website used in North American distribution centers. In 2017 it partnered with a mobile app vendor to design LoadProof, a mobile web application that can give users supply chain information on their smart devices. It is currently exploring the use of drones for its warehouse operations, partnering with PINC Solutions to deploy an aerial sensor platform and supply chain drone. They have also indicated that they are pursuing research in robotics, augmented reality, wearables, and 3D printing. In May 2017, it sponsored a study with the University of Tennessee, Knoxville's Global Supply Chain Institute identifying five technologies that companies should examine to ensure their survival in the supply chain industry.

== Awards and recognition ==
Kenco Group has received recognition from several logistics and supply chain industry organizations. Inbound Logistics recognized Kenco as a Top 10 Logistics Provider from 2013 through 2017 and later named the company among its Top 10 3PL Providers, Top 100 3PL Providers, Green Supply Chain Partners, and Top 3PL Technology Providers in 2025.

Food Logistics recognized Kenco among its Top Food Chain Providers in 2025. Company representatives were also recognized through the publication's Pros to Know, Pros to Know Rising Stars, and Rock Stars of the Supply Chain programs in 2025 and 2026.

In 2025, Kenco was included on the Inc. 5000 list of America's Fastest-Growing Private Companies.

Transport Topics included Kenco among its Top 100 logistics companies in 2025.

Armstrong & Associates ranked Kenco among the Top 50 United States third-party logistics providers, the Top 100 Domestic Transportation Management 3PL providers, the Top 25 Global Warehousing 3PL providers, and the Top 25 North American Warehousing 3PL providers in 2025.

Kenco also received a Supplier Excellence Award from Procter & Gamble in 2025 and was recognized through the Women in Supply Chain program by Supply & Demand Chain Executive.
