= KJJF =

Pair of radio stations in Harlingen, Texas

KJJF and KHID
KJJF: Harlingen, Texas; KHID: McAllen, Texas; United States
- Broadcast area: Rio Grande Valley
- Frequencies: KJJF: 88.9 (MHz); KHID: 88.1 (MHz)
- Branding: UTRGV Student Radio

Programming
- Format: Campus radio

Ownership
- Owner: University of Texas Rio Grande Valley, Inc.
- Sister stations: KVAQ-TV

History
- First air date: KJJF: April 1991; KHID: July 1992
- Former call signs: KJJF: KMBH-FM (1989–2015)
- Call sign meaning: KJJF: John Joseph Fitzpatrick (station founder and bishop); KHID: Hidalgo County, Texas

Technical information
- Licensing authority: FCC
- Facility ID: KJJF: 56081; KHID: 56082
- Class: KJJF: A; KHID: A
- ERP: KJJF: 3,000 watts; KHID: 2,100 watts
- HAAT: KJJF: 91 meters (299 ft); KHID: 78 meters (256 ft)
- Transmitter coordinates: KJJF: 26°10′48.2″N 97°30′7.8″W; KHID: 26°21′43″N 98°19′17.4″W
- Translator(s): KJJF: 104.7 K284DB (South Padre Island)

Links
- Public license information: KJJF: Public file; LMS; KHID: Public file; LMS
- Webcast: Listen live
- Website: www.utrgvradio.com

KJJF (88.9 FM) is a non-commercial radio station in Harlingen, Texas. KHID (88.1 FM) is a non-commercial FM radio station in McAllen, Texas. KJJF's transmitter is located on Fresnal Road in San Benito, and KHID's transmitter is off West Monte Cristo Road in La Homa. The stations broadcast the University of Texas Rio Grande Valley network. Both stations formerly broadcast in Spanish but have since been broadcast in English.

== History ==
KJJF signed on the air on April 30, 1991, as KMBH-FM. It began airing NPR programming in June of the same year. KMBH-FM has an effective radiated power (ERP) of 3,000 watts, while some of the commercial FM stations in the air run 100,000 watts, so KMBH-FM's signal was limited mainly to Cameron County, Texas.

Then in July 1992, KHID signed on. While KHID is also limited in power, the combination of the two stations give coverage to most areas of the McAllen-Brownsville-Harligen radio market. Both stations were owned by Rio Grande Valley Educational Broadcasting, a subsidiary of the Roman Catholic Diocese of Brownsville. The two stations began simulcasting news and talk programming from NPR with some hours devoted to classical music and jazz.

On April 3, 2015, RGV Educational Broadcasting announced that it would change KMBH-FM's call letters to KJJF effective April 7. The new call sign honored RGV Educational Broadcasting founder Bishop John Joseph Fitzpatrick. It also distinguished the radio station from KMBH television, which had been sold to R Communications several months earlier.

In early 2019, the diocese announced that both stations would be bought by Immaculate Heart Media, Inc. for $1.25 million. Both stations became affiliates of Relevant Radio's Spanish language Catholic radio network after the purchase was finalized on May 30, 2019. On May 17, 2021, Relevant Radio closed its Spanish-language service and integrated its stations–including KJJF and KHID–into its English-language network. In September 6, 2026 UTRGV selling off Relevant Radio Catholic radio affiliation is sell to University of Texas Rio Grande Valley (UTRGV) Student Media purchasing KJJF and KHID-FM sale finalized on September 26, 2026.

== See also ==
- KFXV (TV)
