= KGBT-TV =

Television station in Harlingen, Texas

- Harlingen–McAllen–Brownsville, Texas; United States
- City: Harlingen, Texas
- Channels: Digital: 18 (UHF); Virtual: 4
- Branding: KGBT CW 4; KGBT 4.2 MyTV (4.2)

Programming
- Affiliations: 4.1: CW+; 4.2: Independent with MyNetworkTV; for others, see § Subchannels

Ownership
- Owner: Nexstar Media Group; (Tribune Broadcasting Company II, LLC)
- Sister stations: KVEO-TV

History
- Founded: May 20, 1953
- First air date: October 4, 1953
- Former call signs: KGBS-TV (May–December 1953)
- Former channel numbers: Analog: 4 (VHF, 1953–2009); Digital: 31 (UHF, 2003–2020)
- Former affiliations: CBS (1953–2020); ABC (secondary, 1953–1976); NBC (secondary, 1976–1981); Dark (2020-2021); Estrella TV (4.4, 2020-2026); Antenna TV (2021–2026, now on 4.4); MyNetworkTV (secondary, 2021–2026, now on 4.2)
- Call sign meaning: Genevieve Beryl Tichenor, wife of founding owner McHenry Tichenor

Technical information
- Licensing authority: FCC
- Facility ID: 34457
- ERP: 860 kW
- HAAT: 397.2 m (1,303 ft)
- Transmitter coordinates: 26°8′56.8″N 97°49′19.2″W

Links
- Public license information: Public file; LMS

KGBT-TV (channel 4) is a television station licensed to Harlingen, Texas, United States, serving the Lower Rio Grande Valley as the local outlet for The CW Plus on its main channel and a primary independent station with a secondary MyNetworkTV affiliation on its second subchannel. It is owned by Nexstar Media Group, The CW's parent company, alongside Brownsville-licensed dual NBC/CBS affiliate KVEO-TV (channel 23). The two stations share studios on West Expressway (I-2/US 83) in Harlingen; KGBT-TV's transmitter is located in La Feria, Texas.

KGBT-TV was the first television station established on the American side of the Rio Grande Valley and is the oldest still in operation. Long the CBS affiliate for the area, this changed when Nexstar acquired KGBT's non-license assets from Sinclair Broadcast Group and moved the CBS programming to a subchannel of KVEO in 2020. Nexstar later acquired the KGBT-TV license itself. In 2026, KGBT-TV became a CW owned-and-operated station.

== History ==
=== Early history ===
KGBT-TV's roots lie in the 1941 establishment of KGBS radio, an independent radio station with a staff of eleven people. The station was owned by the Harbenito Broadcasting Company, controlled former Valley Morning Star publisher McHenry Tichenor, and became an affiliate of the CBS Radio Network in 1943.

The first television station in the market was XELD-TV (channel 7); founded in 1951, it served as an end-run around the Federal Communications Commission's freeze on television license grants. Once this was lifted in 1952, the radio stations on the U.S. side of the Rio Grande got their opportunity to pursue television stations of their own. On May 20, 1953, Magic Triangle Televisors, Inc., an affiliate of KGBS, was granted a construction permit for channel 4. Roy Hofheinz, who at the time owned radio station KSOX (1530 AM) in the area, withdrew his application; later in the year, KGBS bought the KSOX facility and moved from 1240 to 1530 kHz.

On October 4, 1953, KGBS-TV made its debut with CBS television programming. The call letters were changed to KGBT-TV on December 9, though the new designation was not used until the start of 1954, when the radio station also became KGBT. The next year, KRGV-TV channel 5 started with NBC programs, and XELD-TV closed. For the next 22 years, the two stations split ABC programming; when KRGV-TV changed to being a primary ABC affiliate in 1976, KGBT-TV became a joint CBS-NBC affiliate until KVEO-TV began in 1981.

Channel 4 remained under Tichenor ownership for more than 30 years and was the traditional ratings leader in the Rio Grande Valley for news. However, as Tichenor's broadcasting empire became specialized in Spanish-language radio, KGBT-TV became an outlier. In 1986, Tichenor sold KGBT-TV to Draper Communications of Salisbury, Maryland, which at the time owned WBOC-TV in that city and KOAM-TV in Pittsburg, Kansas. The station was then purchased in 1998 by Cosmos Broadcasting, the broadcasting division of the Liberty Corporation, for $42 million. Cosmos came directly under the Liberty banner in 2001 when Liberty sold off its insurance business.

=== Barrington and Sinclair ownership ===
On August 25, 2005, Liberty Corporation announced that it would sell all 15 stations it owned to Raycom Media. Raycom, however, then earmarked several stations for divestiture in order to meet local and national ownership limits or because they were located far from the company's focus areas; these included two of the Liberty stations, KGBT-TV and WWAY-TV in Wilmington, North Carolina. The Liberty deal was then completed on January 31, 2006.

On March 27, 2006, KGBT-TV was sold to Barrington Broadcasting as part of a group deal that included 11 other Raycom stations. The FCC approved the deal in June 2006, and the purchase closed August 11. Barrington then sold its 18-station portfolio to Sinclair Broadcast Group in 2013.

=== Sale to Nexstar Media Group ===
Last logo as a CBS affiliate. Retained by KVEO's second digital channel.

In 2017, Sinclair attempted to acquire Tribune Media. The acquisition collapsed in August 2018, after which Tribune was instead acquired by Nexstar. Tribune had previously filed a breach of contract lawsuit against Sinclair, which Sinclair and Nexstar—as successor-in-interest to Tribune—settled on January 28, 2020.

As part of the settlement, Sinclair paid Nexstar $60 million and sold WDKY-TV in Lexington, Kentucky, and the non-license and programming assets of KGBT-TV to Nexstar. KGBT-TV's CBS affiliation, news department, and syndicated programming moved to KVEO's second subchannel the next day. On-air operations mostly remained unchanged, though viewers were asked to rescan their sets in order to continue watching CBS. However, few viewers actually lost access to CBS programming due to the high penetration of cable and satellite in the market.

The KGBT-TV license itself continued to be owned by Sinclair and continued to broadcast its existing digital multicast offerings, with the main 4.1 subchannel silent on the multiplex. The acquisition of the KGBT-TV intellectual unit also allowed Nexstar to move all of KVEO-TV's operations to the KGBT-TV facility in Harlingen and replace the local newscasts it had offered on that station, presented from El Paso, with a news service fully produced locally.

In May 2021, Mission Broadcasting, a company whose stations contract with Nexstar for operational services, acquired KGBT-TV; Nexstar then announced on July 19 of that year that it would purchase the station outright. The deal was completed on September 15. Nexstar immediately reactivated the main 4.1 subchannel to carry its Antenna TV network, which had never been carried in the market prior; MyNetworkTV, which had previously been on KFXV, was added to the subchannel on October 1.

The KGBT-TV tower in La Feria was brought down on March 8, 2024, after two of its 24 guy wires snapped, causing the mast to lean. The tower situation led to the evacuation of nearby homes as well as the cancellation of classes in the La Feria Independent School District.

In early 2026, the main Antenna TV affiliation was dropped, leaving MyNetworkTV as the main affiliate.

In August 2026, it was reported that KGBT-TV would become a CW station, pulling the affiliation from KCWT-CD, effective September 1.

Antenna TV returned to the Rio Grande Valley area on September 1, 2026, replacing Estrella TV which is no longer carried in the Rio Grande Valley.

== News operation ==
=== 24/7 Weather Lab ===
KGBT-TV was the first news station in the metropolitan area with its own live weather radar, which was called "Live Super Doppler". KGBT-TV broadcast a 24-hour weather station, which provided updated local forecasts.

On April 29, 2008, KGBT-TV's 43-year veteran weatherman, Larry James, retired. James was a veteran of the station's "glory days" during the late 1960s and 1970s when the station produced the top-rated newscast in the Rio Grande Valley.

=== "Sports Extra" ===
KGBT-TV formerly aired "Sports Extra", an extended sports segment that aired during the 10 p.m. newscasts on Fridays and Sundays. The main focus of the Friday segment was local high school football games, while the Sunday edition provided the highlights of high school, college and professional football, and generally featured a panel of local sports writers and sports talk radio personalities, who break down high school football games and provide analysis.

=== Notable former on-air staff ===
- Angela Hill

== Technical information ==
=== Subchannels ===
The station's signal is multiplexed.

Subchannels of KGBT-TV
Subchannel	Res.	Short name	Programming
4.1	720p	KGBT4.1	The CW Plus
4.2	480i	KGBT4.2	Independent with MyNetworkTV
4.3	480i	KGBT4.3	Comet
4.4	480i	KGBT4.4	Antenna TV
4.5	480i	KGBT4.5	Ion Mystery
4.6	480i	KGBT4.6	Grit

KGBT's broadcasts became digital-only, effective June 12, 2009.
