= KVEO-TV =

Television station in Brownsville, Texas

- Brownsville–Harlingen–McAllen, Texas; United States
- City: Brownsville, Texas
- Channels: Digital: 24 (UHF); Virtual: 23
- Branding: NBC 23; CBS Rio Grande Valley (23.2)

Programming
- Affiliations: 23.1: NBC; 23.2: CBS

Ownership
- Owner: Nexstar Media Group; (Nexstar Media Inc.)
- Sister stations: KGBT-TV

History
- First air date: December 19, 1981
- Former call signs: KVEO (1981–2009)
- Former channel numbers: Analog: 23 (UHF, 1981–2009)
- Former affiliations: UPN (secondary, 1997–1999); Estrella TV (23.2, 2009–2020)
- Call sign meaning: KVEO = que veo, Spanish for "what I watch"

Technical information
- Licensing authority: FCC
- Facility ID: 12523
- ERP: 1,000 kW
- HAAT: 445 m (1,460 ft)
- Transmitter coordinates: 26°06′03″N 97°50′20″W

Links
- Public license information: Public file; LMS
- Website: www.valleycentral.com

KVEO-TV (channel 23) is a television station licensed to Brownsville, Texas, United States, serving the Lower Rio Grande Valley as an affiliate of NBC and CBS. It is owned by Nexstar Media Group alongside Harlingen-licensed dual CW/MyNetworkTV affiliate KGBT-TV (channel 4). The two stations share studios on West Expressway (I-2/US 83) in Harlingen; KVEO-TV's transmitter is located in Santa Maria, Texas.

KVEO-TV was the third major commercial station to start in the Rio Grande Valley, beginning broadcasting on December 19, 1981. It immediately became the full-time NBC affiliate in the market. Its original ownership was rocked by financial problems and connections to a failed bank; it emerged from bankruptcy in 1984. Two attempts at local newscasts (1981–1982 and 1985–1986) lasted less than two years each. The station was sold to what became Communications Corporation of America (ComCorp) in 1990. ComCorp began airing local news programming on the station again in 2007, though beginning in 2010 this was produced out-of-market at another station in the company.

Nexstar acquired KVEO-TV in 2013. In 2020, it acquired from Sinclair Broadcast Group all of the non-license assets of KGBT-TV, which had been the CBS affiliate, and its facilities. KGBT-TV's programming became the CBS subchannel of KVEO-TV, and news programming was realigned on both channels.

== History ==
The first construction permit for channel 23 at Brownsville was awarded to Pan American Broadcasting Corporation in 1974; officials intended to build the station as the missing network affiliate for the market, then ABC. The station got as far as receiving call letters, but no building activity occurred. In 1978, the FCC review board granted an extension of time, noting that Pan American had attempted to merge with another proposed UHF station at McAllen; that merger fell through, and the group was allowed to try to transfer the permit.

=== Tierra del Sol ownership ===
The Pan American permit never materialized, and the channel was empty when Tierra del Sol Broadcasting Corporation applied on October 21, 1979, for channel 23. It immediately sought NBC affiliation; at the time, the city had a dual NBC–CBS affiliate, KGBT-TV, that had to try to provide the best programs from both networks and manage conflicts in such areas as sports.

During construction, Tierra del Sol Broadcasting sought to change electricity providers for its studio facility. The KVEO-TV studio building, the former The Godfather nightclub in Brownsville, was originally to be served by the city-owned Public Utility Board (PUB). However, it had a poor reputation for reliability, and brownouts were frequent on the system. The station desired to be served by Corpus Christi-based Central Power & Light (CP&L). It cited a 1975 Texas court decision that allowed it to become a CP&L customer because of its proximity to a CP&L line; when the PUB refused to disconnect its service to the building to permit the change in provider, KVEO did so itself with CP&L's permission, an action that the PUB then appealed to Texas utility regulators in addition to charging the station with criminal mischief. (Note: In February 1982, PUB and CP&L settled the dispute; CP&L was allowed to keep servicing channel 23 but agreed not to connect other PUB customers.) KGBT-TV ceased airing NBC programming on July 1, 1981, at which time KVEO ran newspaper advertising promising it would be on the air in less than 60 days with the NBC programs that would temporarily go unseen in the Valley. However, tower construction delays kept the station off the air.

KVEO began broadcasting on December 19, 1981. It struggled to find an audience, particularly for its Total 23 News programming, with viewers already tuned to KGBT-TV and KRGV-TV. The station's early evening newscasts were canceled in July 1982, followed by the late news that September. Additionally, the Mexican peso slumped beginning in February 1982, two months after the station signed on. That provoked a sharp decline in business activity on the American side of the Rio Grande and created further issues for a station that was already burdened with debt.

In order to raise cash for operating expenses, Peter Dean—one of the partners in Tierra del Sol and its chairman of the board—sold the station's uncollected advertising accounts to a company known as Central Texas Factors. Dean had helped to organize the company with Lawrence Ludka, his law partner; involved in the firm were several principals of the Ranchlander National Bank, a financial institution in the small town of Melvin. Tierra del Sol sued Dean and Ludka in October 1982 for splitting the revenues derived from this business without its knowledge or consent. In response, Dean moved to force KVEO into bankruptcy, claiming it owed him more than $600,000. Another owner of Tierra del Sol, Darrell Davis—who had anchored the station's newscasts prior to their cancellation—called Dean's actions malicious. Davis told The Brownsville Herald, "Mr. Dean has done us and the Valley wrong, and he is in for the most interesting time of his life." Dean's issues were magnified when the Ranchlander National Bank failed on November 19, its de facto owner having been revealed to be a former felon convicted for bank embezzlement. The probe into bank fraud and related broadcasting activity broadened shortly before Christmas as investigators looked into Central Texas Factors. On December 21, 1982, Peter Dean was found dead on a ranch owned by his father-in-law in Comal County. The medical examiner determined that he had died from drinking cola laced with cyanide, though there was also a hose attached to the vehicle's exhaust, and traces of carbon monoxide were found in his body.

Legal proceedings involving KVEO-TV continued into 1983. In April, a deal was reached with Guadalupe South Texas Communications, a commercial subsidiary of the De Rance Foundation of Milwaukee, to purchase KVEO. However, the buyer and seller could not agree on the value of some KVEO-TV assets, delaying closing of the purchase. While this matter was pending, Hundred East Credit Corporation—which held rights to the station's transmitting equipment—accused station officials of fraud, believing they were diverting money to a production company they co-owned even though KVEO's assets had been frozen. Guadalupe South Texas concurred, believing the station would be unable to pay any of its $9.5 million in debts unless a trustee were appointed. In November, Tierra del Sol agreed on an amended purchase arrangement with Guadalupe South Texas, with some of the proceeds being used to pay creditors.

=== Valley Broadcasting/SouthWest MultiMedia ownership ===
However, that sale failed to materialize. Instead, Valley Broadcasting purchased the station for $7.6 million in late 1984. The new ownership restored local news to KVEO in the form of NewsWatch 23 newscasts that began in April 1985. The anchor was Ron Oliveira, who had been working in the Austin market at KVUE; he left to become KVEO's assistant general manager because he wanted management experience en route to someday owning his own station. Facing poor ratings and a depressed economy, and having been promised by the network that discontinuing local news programming would not place its NBC affiliation in jeopardy, the last newscast aired in September 1986.

In 1986, Billy Goldberg—the majority owner of Valley Broadcasting, by then renamed SouthWest MultiMedia—and Oliveira were given an initial grant for a new television station on channel 54 in Austin; Goldberg had pledged to divest himself of KVEO prior to that station going on air. That station was eventually significantly delayed by appeals to the comparative hearing process, but Oliveira had already sold his house in Brownsville and returned to KVUE in Austin.

=== ComCorp ownership ===
In 1990, SouthWest MultiMedia sold its three television stations—KVEO, KWKT-TV in Waco, and KPEJ-TV in Odessa—for $30.4 million to Associated Broadcasters, Inc., a company owned by Thomas R. Galloway of Lafayette, Louisiana. While Galloway had previously owned interests in other stations, the transaction represented Associated's first television holdings alongside three Louisiana radio stations. Galloway's broadcast holdings were known as Communications Corporation of America (ComCorp) by the mid-1990s.

Under ComCorp, the station eschewed local news and called itself "The Valley's Entertainment Leader". After UPN first established a secondary affiliation with KRGV-TV, which only carried Star Trek: Voyager, the network's programming had moved to KVEO by 1997. In 1999, the station lost UPN to XHRIO-TV in Matamoros, Tamaulipas, when that station lost Telemundo. KVEO-TV also began broadcasting in digital in June 2005, adding high-definition programming in February 2006.

KVEO's lack of local news did not change until October 1, 2007, when KVEO began producing evening newscasts again under the name NewsCenter 23. As a cost-cutting measure, ComCorp opted to discontinue the production of newscasts from Brownsville in January 2010. Instead, the news programs would be presented by on-air personalities of KTSM-TV, ComCorp's station in El Paso, with local reporters filing stories that were edited and prepared in El Paso.

=== Nexstar ownership; acquisition of KGBT-TV ===
On April 24, 2013, ComCorp announced the sale of its television stations, including KVEO-TV, to Nexstar Broadcasting Group. The ComCorp sale was completed on January 1, 2015.

Nexstar and Sinclair Broadcast Group settled a breach of contract lawsuit stemming from Sinclair's failed acquisition of Tribune Media, which was ultimately acquired by Nexstar, in January 2020. Sinclair paid Nexstar $60 million and transferred to it WDKY-TV serving Lexington, Kentucky, and all of the non-license assets related to KGBT-TV, the CBS affiliate in the market, including the affiliation, programming, and physical plant. At midnight on January 28, 2020, the CBS subchannel of KGBT-TV became the CBS subchannel of KVEO-TV and moved from channel 4.1 to channel 23.2. In addition, Nexstar announced that it would merge KVEO and KGBT's operations at the latter's facility in Harlingen. KGBT-TV itself was acquired by Mission Broadcasting, an affiliated company; Nexstar then exercised its option to purchase it outright in July 2021.

== Subchannels ==
KVEO-TV's transmitter is located in Santa Maria, Texas. The station's signal is multiplexed:

Subchannels of KVEO-TV
Subchannel	Res.	Short name	Programming
23.1	1080i	KVEONBC	NBC
23.2	1080i	KVEOCBS	CBS

== See also ==
- Channel 4 branded TV stations in the United States
- Channel 23 virtual TV stations in the United States
- Channel 24 digital TV stations in the United States
- List of television stations in Texas
