= KRGV-TV =

Television station in Weslaco, Texas

- Weslaco–McAllen–Harlingen–Brownsville, Texas; United States
- City: Weslaco, Texas
- Channels: Digital: 13 (VHF); Virtual: 5
- Branding: KRGV Channel 5; Channel 5 News; Somos El Valle 5.2; Noticias RGV (5.2)

Programming
- Affiliations: 5.1: ABC; for others, see § Subchannels

Ownership
- Owner: Manship family; (Mobile Video Tapes, Inc. (d/b/a KRGV-TV Corporation))

History
- First air date: April 10, 1954
- Former channel numbers: Analog: 5 (VHF, 1954-2009)
- Former affiliations: NBC (1954–1976); UPN (secondary, 1995–1996)
- Call sign meaning: Rio Grande Valley (originating from KRGV radio)

Technical information
- Licensing authority: FCC
- Facility ID: 43328
- ERP: 57 kW
- HAAT: 445 m (1,460 ft)
- Transmitter coordinates: 26°6′2.3″N 97°50′21.5″W

Links
- Public license information: Public file; LMS
- Website: www.krgv.com/home/

KRGV-TV (channel 5) is a television station licensed to Weslaco, Texas, United States, serving as the ABC affiliate for the Lower Rio Grande Valley. The station is owned by the Manship family of Baton Rouge, Louisiana, through Mobile Video Tapes, Inc., which frequently does business as KRGV-TV Corporation. KRGV-TV's studios are located on East Expressway (I-2/US 83) in Weslaco, and its transmitter is located in Santa Maria, Texas.

== History ==
KRGV logo used from 2009 to 2012.

KRGV joined as a primary NBC affiliate in 1954, sharing ABC programming with KGBT-TV. The original owner of the station was O. L. Taylor. In 1956, Taylor sold half of the station's interest to future President Lyndon B. Johnson and his wife, Lady Bird Johnson's Texas-based broadcasting company. The Johnsons owned the station until 1961, until they sold it to Kenco Enterprises. Mobile Video Tapes, which was formed by the Manship family, purchased the station from Kenco three years later. On April 12, 1976, KRGV became the first NBC affiliate to switch to ABC during a push by the network to attract new, stronger affiliates. One year later, sister station WBRZ in Baton Rouge followed suit. From 1976 to 1981, CBS affiliate KGBT-TV would carry NBC programming on a secondary basis. NBC would not return full time to the Rio Grande Valley until KVEO-TV signed on in 1981.

In 1995, KRGV added a secondary affiliation with UPN. The following year, UPN programming moved to KVEO.

On August 24, 2009, KRGV extended its 10 p.m. newscast by 30 minutes. KRGV was one of six ABC affiliates to have hour-long 10 p.m. newscasts, along with KOAT-TV in Albuquerque, KITV in Honolulu, WISN-TV in Milwaukee, WEAR-TV in Pensacola, Florida, and KSTP-TV in Minneapolis–Saint Paul.

On September 9, 2009, KRGV began broadcasting in HD, and that same year, the channel rebranded itself to Channel 5 News.

On November 2, 2020, KRGV's set was redesigned with new graphics and music.

== Preemptions and delays ==
For many years, KRGV aired syndicated programming leading back into ABC's late night block and tape delayed the latter to accommodate whatever syndicated programming aired at that time. Married... with Children consistently aired at 10:30 p.m. following the newscast since it first began airing in syndication, while the rest of the late night schedule shifted around through the years. This caused the ABC program Nightline to air as late as an hour and a half after its network slot and Jimmy Kimmel Live! as many as two hours after its network slot in some years. By the 2010s, both Nightline and Jimmy Kimmel Live! air back to back as they do across many affiliates, but were tape-delayed 30 minutes in favor of an extension of the 10 p.m. news known as Channel 5 News at 10:30. Because of the delay, both Nightline and Kimmel were broadcast in standard definition. KRGV did not yet have the capability to record the two programs in HD for later rebroadcast. This all changed in 2009, when KRGV began recording network and syndicated programming in HD, enabling both Nightline and Kimmel to be seen in HD.

In November 2004, KRGV, along with many other ABC affiliates, opted not to air the movie Saving Private Ryan when the network broadcast it uncut on Veterans Day.

In January 2018, KRGV's contract with Tribune Broadcasting's Antenna TV ended, and the station moved its 10:30 p.m. newscast as part of its newly launched and locally programmed independent station known as "Somos El Valle", which includes a mix of Spanish and English content. This allowed the station to air Kimmel and Nightline at their regular time slots as scheduled by the network.

Because of the station's midday newscast which airs at noon, KRGV has aired GMA: The Third Hour (previously The Chew and All My Children) on a day-behind basis at 11 a.m.

== Technical information ==
=== Subchannels ===
The station's signal is multiplexed:

Subchannels of KRGV-TV
Subchannel	Res.	Short name	Programming
5.1	720p	KRGV HD	ABC
5.2	720p	Somos	Bilingual independent
5.3	480p	METV	MeTV
5.4	480p	METOONS	MeTV Toons (4:3)
5.5	480p	5Now	Local weather (4:3)

=== Analog-to-digital conversion ===
KRGV-TV ended regular programming over its analog signal, over VHF channel 5, on June 12, 2009, the official date on which full-power television stations in the United States transitioned from analog to digital broadcasts under federal mandate. The station's digital signal remained on its pre-transition VHF channel 13, using virtual channel 5.

As part of the SAFER Act, KRGV kept its analog signal on the air until July 12 to inform viewers of the digital television transition through a loop of public service announcements from the National Association of Broadcasters.
