= Harlingen, Texas =

- City
- City of Harlingen
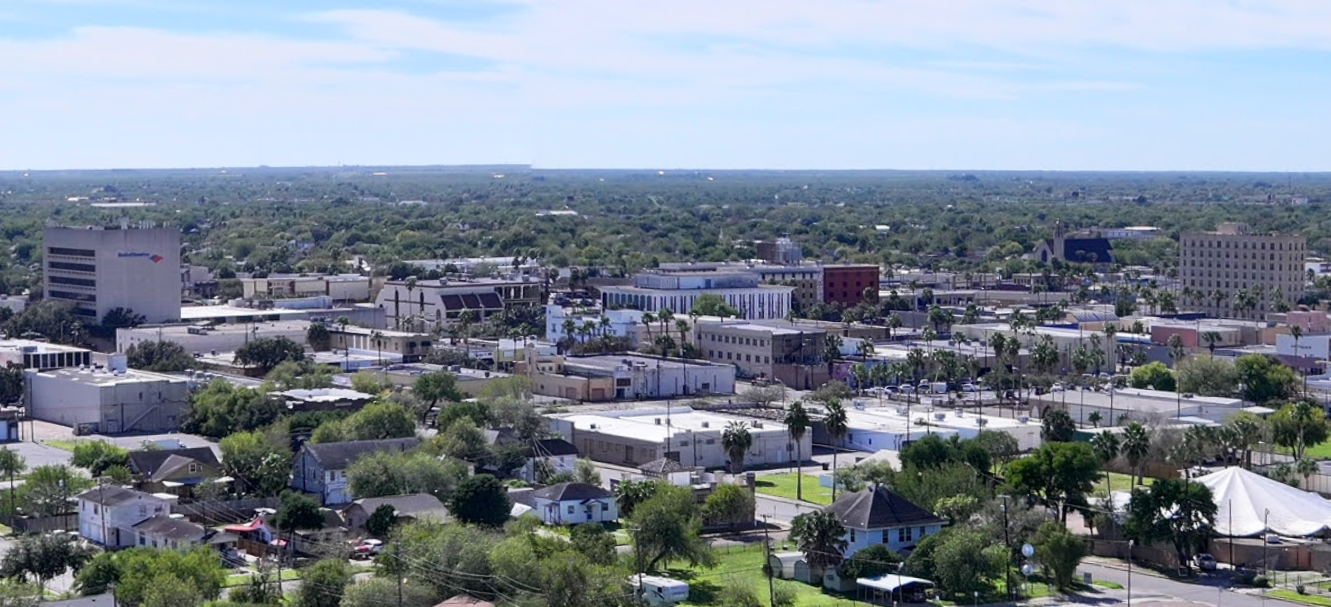
- Skyline of Harlingen

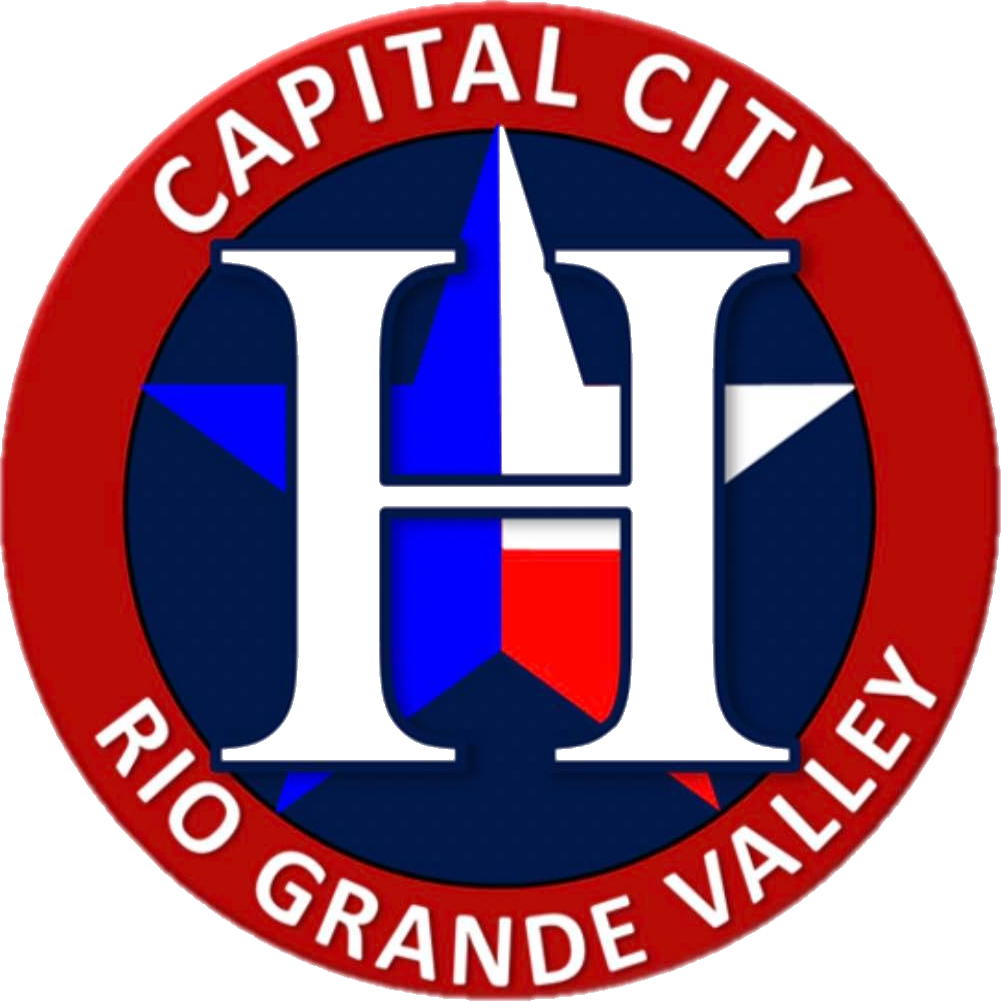
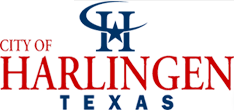
- Flag Seal Wordmark
- Nicknames: "Capital City of the Valley", "H-Town"
- Motto: "The Capital of the Rio Grande Valley"
- Location in Cameron County and Texas

- Location in the State of Texas Location in the United States
- Coordinates: 26°12′N 97°42′W
- Country: United States
- State: Texas
- County: Cameron
- Founded: 1904
- Named for: Harlingen, Netherlands

Government
  - Type: Council-Manager
  - Mayor: Norma Sepulveda
  - City Manager: Gabriel Gonzalez

Area
  - City: 40.63 sq mi (105.22 km^{2})
  - Land: 40.13 sq mi (103.93 km^{2})
  - Water: 0.50 sq mi (1.29 km^{2})
- Elevation: 39 ft (12 m)

Population (2020)
  - City: 71,829
  - Estimate (2021): 71,925
  - Density: 1,790.0/sq mi (691.13/km^{2})
  - Metro: 406,220
- Time zone: UTC−6 (CST)
  - Summer (DST): UTC−5 (CDT)
- ZIP codes: 78550-78553
- Area code: 956
- FIPS code: 48-32372
- GNIS feature ID: 1337354
- Website: www.harlingentx.gov

Harlingen (/ˈhɑːrlɪndʒɪn/ HAR-lin-jin) is a city in Cameron County, Texas. It is located in the central region of the Rio Grande Valley, about 30 miles (48 km) from the coast of the Gulf of Mexico. The city covers more than 40 square miles (104 km^{2}) and is the second-largest city in Cameron County, as well as the sixth-largest in the Rio Grande Valley. As of the 2020 census, the city had a population of 71,892.

Harlingen is a principal city of the Brownsville–Harlingen metropolitan area, which is part of the larger Brownsville–Harlingen–Raymondville combined statistical area, included in the Matamoros–Brownsville metropolitan region.

== History ==
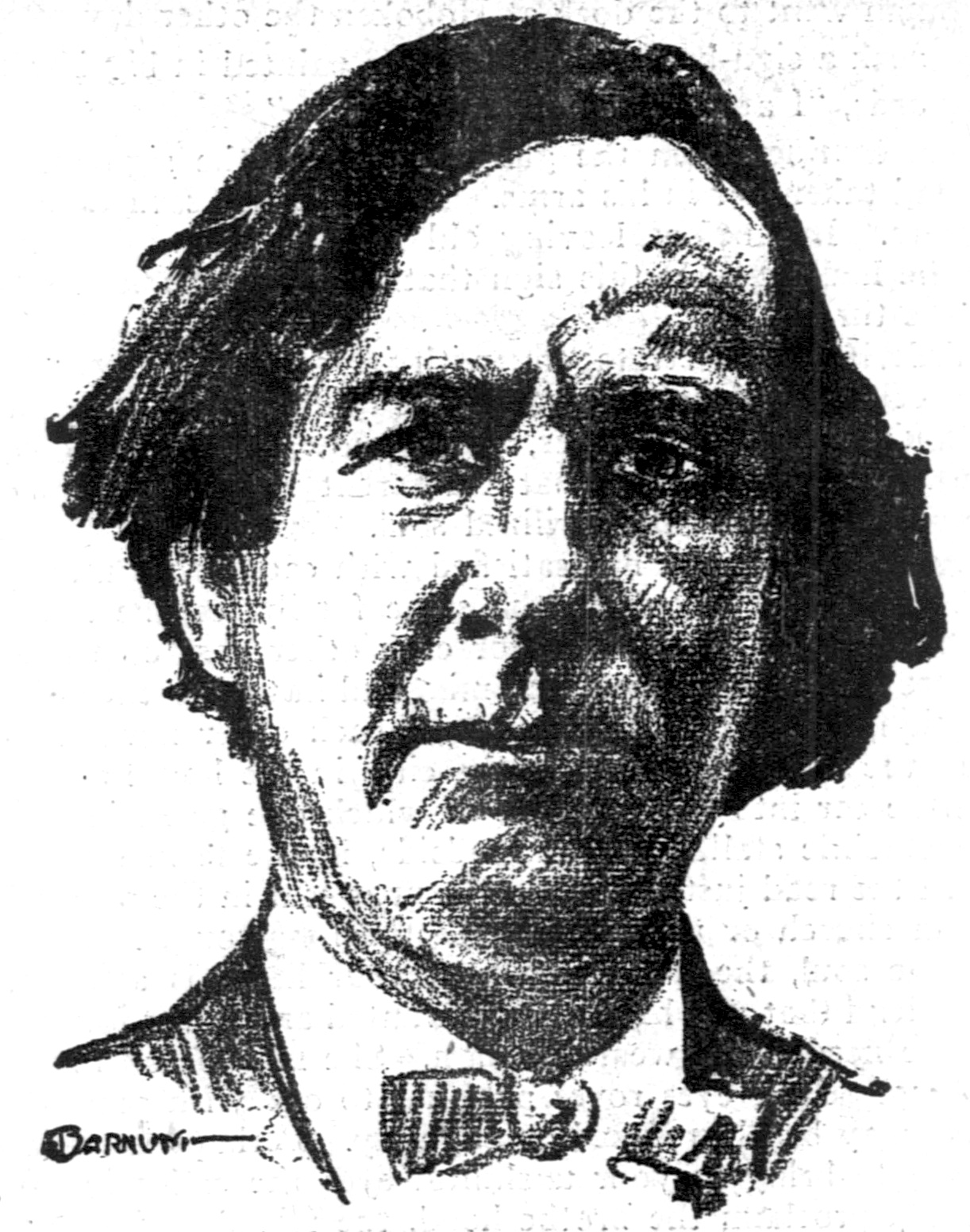
A drawing of Lon Hill in 1912

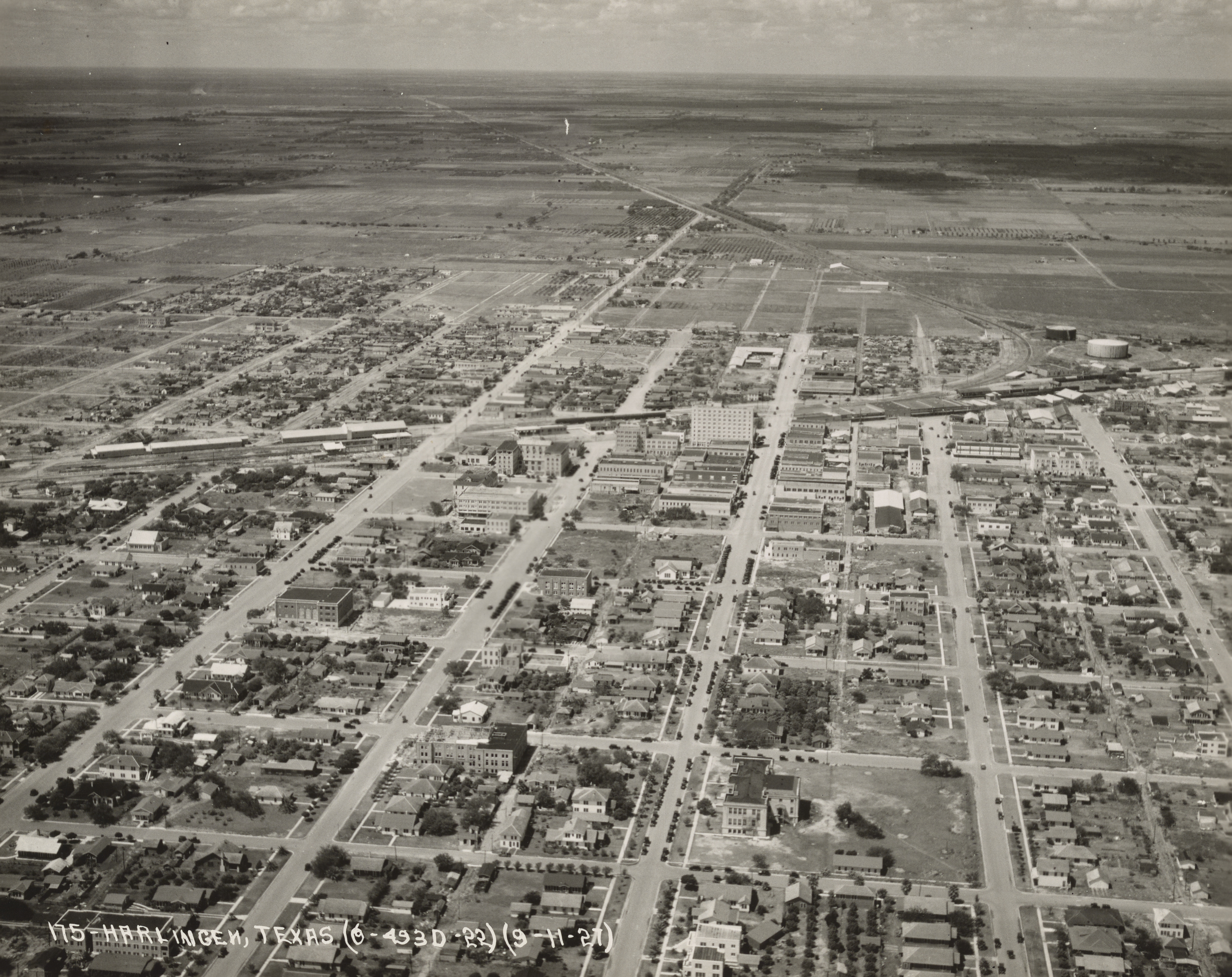
Harlingen in 1927

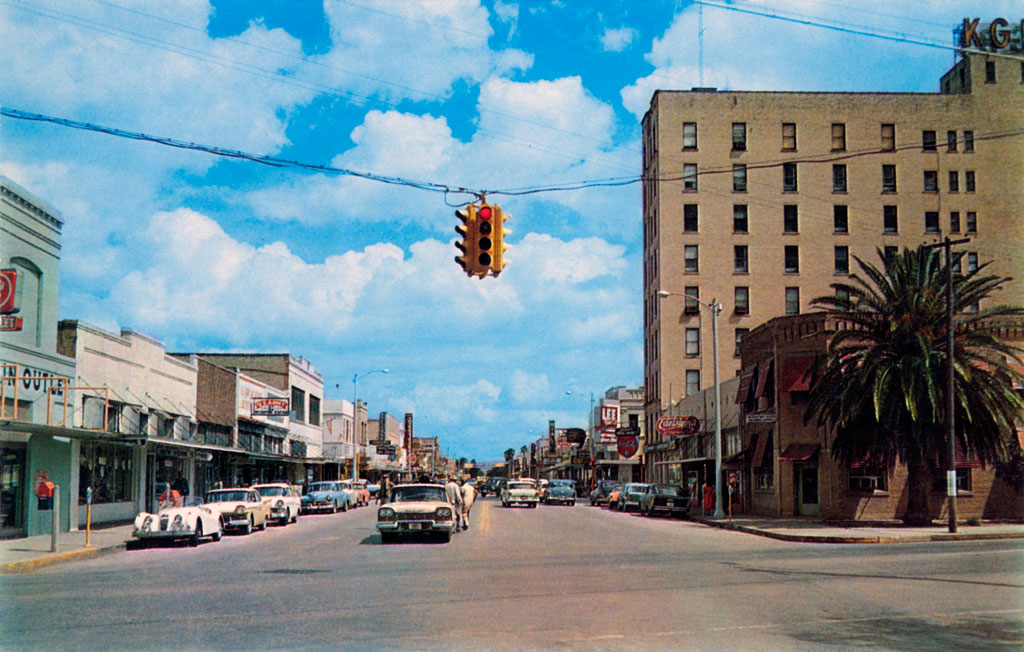
Harlingen's Jackson Street in the late 1950s

Harlingen's strategic location at the intersection of U.S. Route 77 and U.S. Route 83, codesignated as Interstate 69 East and Interstate 2, respectively, in northwestern Cameron County, fostered its development as a distribution, shipping, and industrial center. In 1904, Lon C. Hill (a man of Choctaw ancestry) envisioned the Rio Grande as a commercial waterway. He named the town he founded on the north bank after the Frisian city of Harlingen, in the Netherlands. The town's post office was established that year. The first school opened with 15 pupils in 1905 near the Hill home, the first residence built in Harlingen. Harlingen incorporated on April 15, 1910, when the population totaled 1,126. In 1920, the census listed 1,748. The local economy at first was almost entirely agricultural, with the chief crops vegetables and cotton.

World War II military installations in Harlingen caused a jump in population from 23,000 in 1950 to 41,000 by 1960. Harlingen Army Air Field preceded Harlingen Air Force Base, which closed in 1962. The city's population fell to 33,603 by 1972, then climbed to 40,824 by 1980. Local enterprise, focused on the purchase and use of the abandoned base and related housing, laid the groundwork for continuing progress through a diversified economy. The estimated population in July 1985 was 49,000, of which about 80% was Hispanic. In the late 1980s, income from tourism ranked second only to citrus fruit production, with grain and cotton next in order. The addition of wholesale and retail trade, light and medium manufacturing, and an array of service industries has broadened the economic base. Large-scale construction for multifaceted retirement communities is a new phase of industrial development.

The City of Harlingen operates a busy industrial airpark where bombers used to land. At Valley International Airport, the Confederate Air Force (now Commemorative Air Force) occupied hangar and apron space until 1991. The first hospital in Harlingen opened in 1923, and consisted of little more than two barracks as wings. The Valley Baptist Hospital was built nearby a few years later, and eventually the older hospital closed. The Valley Baptist Hospital has grown into the Valley Baptist Medical Center. The city's outstanding network of health-care specialists and facilities parallels the growth of the still-expanding center. Also serving regional health needs are the South Texas State Chest Hospital, the State Hospital for Children, and the Rio Grande State Mental Health and Mental Retardation Center.

Besides public and church-affiliated schools, Harlingen students attend the University Preparatory School, the Marine Military Academy, Texas State Technical College, or Rio Grande Vocational and Rehabilitation classes. Civic and cultural development in Harlingen has kept pace with the growth of the community. Fraternal orders and civic organizations operating in the community include Rotary, Kiwanis, Lions, Optimist, 20–30, VFW, American Legion, and the Lower Valley Cotillion Club; a woman's building is maintained as a center for the activities of the many woman's clubs active in the city. Development and appreciation of the fine arts are encouraged by organizations such as the Rio Grande Valley Art League, the Art Forum, and the Rio Grande Valley Civic Association, which stages its winter concert series at the 2,300-seat Harlingen Municipal Auditorium. Each March, Harlingen is the site of the Rio Grande Valley International Music Festival. The city has two newspapers—the Harlingen Press, a weekly paper established in 1951, and the Valley Morning Star, a daily established in 1911. In 1990, the population was 48,735. In 1992, the city was named an All-America City, cited especially for its volunteer spirit and self-help programs. In 2000, the community had 57,564 inhabitants and 2,549 businesses.

== Geography ==
According to the United States Census Bureau, the city has a total area of 40.3 square miles (104.4 km^{2}), of which 39.8 square miles (103.1 km^{2}) is land and 0.5 square miles (1.3 km^{2}), or 1.22%, is covered by water.

Soils in Harlingen range in texture from fine sandy loam to clay. They are neutral to moderately alkaline with pH of 7.2 to 8.5 (most commonly around 8.2), and are moderately well drained or well drained in most cases, with small areas of poorly drained, saline clays.

=== Climate ===
Harlingen has a humid subtropical climate (Köppen Cfa). Summers are long, and very humid with hot days and warm nights. Winters are very dry with warm days and cool nights. Precipitation peaks during September, with an average of 5.76 inches (146 mm) precipitation falling.

Climate data for Harlingen, Texas, 1991–2020 normals, extremes 1912–present
| Month | Jan | Feb | Mar | Apr | May | Jun | Jul | Aug | Sep | Oct | Nov | Dec | Year |
|---|---|---|---|---|---|---|---|---|---|---|---|---|---|
| Record high °F (°C) | 93 (34) | 99 (37) | 104 (40) | 107 (42) | 107 (42) | 106 (41) | 107 (42) | 108 (42) | 106 (41) | 100 (38) | 97 (36) | 93 (34) | 108 (42) |
| Mean maximum °F (°C) | 84.6 (29.2) | 88.3 (31.3) | 92.1 (33.4) | 95.1 (35.1) | 96.3 (35.7) | 99.1 (37.3) | 99.8 (37.7) | 100.8 (38.2) | 98.9 (37.2) | 94.4 (34.7) | 89.5 (31.9) | 85.4 (29.7) | 101.9 (38.8) |
| Mean daily maximum °F (°C) | 71.7 (22.1) | 76.0 (24.4) | 81.0 (27.2) | 86.4 (30.2) | 91.1 (32.8) | 95.4 (35.2) | 96.6 (35.9) | 97.8 (36.6) | 93.1 (33.9) | 88.0 (31.1) | 79.7 (26.5) | 73.2 (22.9) | 85.8 (29.9) |
| Daily mean °F (°C) | 61.4 (16.3) | 65.4 (18.6) | 70.5 (21.4) | 76.1 (24.5) | 81.5 (27.5) | 85.6 (29.8) | 86.8 (30.4) | 87.3 (30.7) | 83.4 (28.6) | 77.4 (25.2) | 69.3 (20.7) | 62.8 (17.1) | 75.6 (24.2) |
| Mean daily minimum °F (°C) | 51.1 (10.6) | 54.8 (12.7) | 60.0 (15.6) | 65.9 (18.8) | 71.8 (22.1) | 75.9 (24.4) | 76.9 (24.9) | 76.8 (24.9) | 73.6 (23.1) | 66.8 (19.3) | 58.8 (14.9) | 52.5 (11.4) | 65.4 (18.6) |
| Mean minimum °F (°C) | 35.9 (2.2) | 39.6 (4.2) | 43.3 (6.3) | 51.1 (10.6) | 59.9 (15.5) | 70.1 (21.2) | 72.2 (22.3) | 72.4 (22.4) | 64.9 (18.3) | 51.4 (10.8) | 42.3 (5.7) | 36.3 (2.4) | 33.5 (0.8) |
| Record low °F (°C) | 14 (−10) | 21 (−6) | 29 (−2) | 37 (3) | 46 (8) | 57 (14) | 60 (16) | 60 (16) | 52 (11) | 33 (1) | 29 (−2) | 15 (−9) | 14 (−10) |
| Average precipitation inches (mm) | 1.22 (31) | 1.19 (30) | 1.49 (38) | 2.29 (58) | 2.73 (69) | 2.37 (60) | 2.44 (62) | 2.07 (53) | 5.76 (146) | 3.06 (78) | 2.00 (51) | 1.58 (40) | 28.20 (716) |
| Average snowfall inches (cm) | 0.0 (0.0) | 0.0 (0.0) | 0.0 (0.0) | 0.0 (0.0) | 0.0 (0.0) | 0.0 (0.0) | 0.0 (0.0) | 0.0 (0.0) | 0.0 (0.0) | 0.0 (0.0) | 0.0 (0.0) | 0.1 (0.25) | 0.1 (0.25) |
| Average precipitation days (≥ 0.01 in) | 7.5 | 5.8 | 5.8 | 4.8 | 4.9 | 6.5 | 5.1 | 5.9 | 10.5 | 6.3 | 6.3 | 7.5 | 76.9 |
| Average snowy days (≥ 0.1 in) | 0.0 | 0.0 | 0.0 | 0.0 | 0.0 | 0.0 | 0.0 | 0.0 | 0.0 | 0.0 | 0.0 | 0.0 | 0 |
Source 1: NOAA
Source 2: National Weather Service

== Demographics ==
Historical population
| Census | Pop. | Note | %± |
|---|---|---|---|
| 1920 | 1,784 | | — |
| 1930 | 12,124 | | 579.6% |
| 1940 | 13,306 | | 9.7% |
| 1950 | 23,229 | | 74.6% |
| 1960 | 41,207 | | 77.4% |
| 1970 | 33,503 | | −18.7% |
| 1980 | 43,543 | | 30.0% |
| 1990 | 48,735 | | 11.9% |
| 2000 | 57,564 | | 18.1% |
| 2010 | 64,849 | | 12.7% |
| 2020 | 71,829 | | 10.8% |
| 2021 (est.) | 71,925 | | 0.1% |
U.S. Decennial Census; 1850–1900 1910; 1920 1930 1940; 1950 1960 1970; 1980 1990 2000; 2010 2020

=== 2020 census ===
As of the 2020 census, Harlingen had a population of 71,829 and was home to 15,548 families. It had a median age of 35.3 years. 27.5% of residents were under the age of 18 and 16.9% of residents were 65 years of age or older. For every 100 females there were 92.1 males, and for every 100 females age 18 and over there were 87.0 males age 18 and over.

97.6% of residents lived in urban areas, while 2.4% lived in rural areas.

There were 25,184 households in Harlingen, of which 37.4% had children under the age of 18 living in them. Of all households, 43.6% were married-couple households, 17.3% were households with a male householder and no spouse or partner present, and 32.4% were households with a female householder and no spouse or partner present. About 24.6% of all households were made up of individuals and 11.5% had someone living alone who was 65 years of age or older.

There were 28,512 housing units, of which 11.7% were vacant. The homeowner vacancy rate was 1.5% and the rental vacancy rate was 8.5%.

Racial composition as of the 2020 census
| Race | Number | Percent |
|---|---|---|
| White | 32,863 | 45.8% |
| Black or African American | 753 | 1.0% |
| American Indian and Alaska Native | 527 | 0.7% |
| Asian | 952 | 1.3% |
| Native Hawaiian and Other Pacific Islander | 46 | 0.1% |
| Some other race | 11,073 | 15.4% |
| Two or more races | 25,615 | 35.7% |
| Hispanic or Latino (of any race) | 58,702 | 81.7% |

=== 2000 census ===
As of the census of 2000, 57,564 people, 19,021 households, and 14,360 families resided in the city. The population density was 1,689.6 people per square mile (652.4 people/km^{2}). The 23,008 housing units averaged 675.3/mi^{2} (260.7/km^{2}). The racial makeup of the city was 78.68% White, 0.92% Black, 0.52% Native American, 0.88% Asian, 0.03% Pacific Islander, 16.39% from other races, and 2.58% from two or more races. About 72.76% of the population was Hispanic or Latino of any race; most are of Mexican descent.

As in other cities in the Lower Rio Grande Valley, a significant part of Harlingen's transient population and a significant contributor to its economy consists of "Winter Texans", generally retirees from the northern Midwestern states and Canada, who come to escape the northern winter weather between roughly November and April.

Of the 19,021 households, 38.6% had children under the age of 18, 55.6% were married couples living together, 16.2% had a female householder with no husband present, and 24.5% were not families; 20.9% of all households were made up of individuals, and 10.3% had someone living alone 65 years of age or older. The average household size was 2.94, and the average family size was 3.44.

In the city, the population was distributed as 30.7% under the age of 18, 9.6% from 18 to 24, 26.5% from 25 to 44, 18.0% from 45 to 64, and 15.0% who were 65 years of age or older. The median age was 32 years. For every 100 females, there were 90.8 males. For every 100 females age 18 and over, there were 85.0 males.

The median income for a household in the city was $30,296, and for a family was $34,015. Males had a median income of $27,014 versus $21,795 for females. The per capita income for the city was $13,886. About 19.3% of families and 24.9% of the population were below the poverty line, including 34.7% of those under age 18 and 16.2% of those age 65 or over.

== Government ==
=== City government ===
Harlingen is governed by a mayor elected at-large and a five-member city commission representing five individual single-member districts. All seats are eligible for election every three years. The current mayor is Norma Sepulveda, who was elected in 2022. The city commissioners are District 1 Ford H. Kinsley, District 2 Daniel N. Lopez, District 3 Mike Mezmar, District 4 Frank Morales, and District 5 Rene Perez.

==== City commission ====
The commission meets on the first and third Wednesdays of each month at 5:30 pm at City Hall.

==== Police department ====
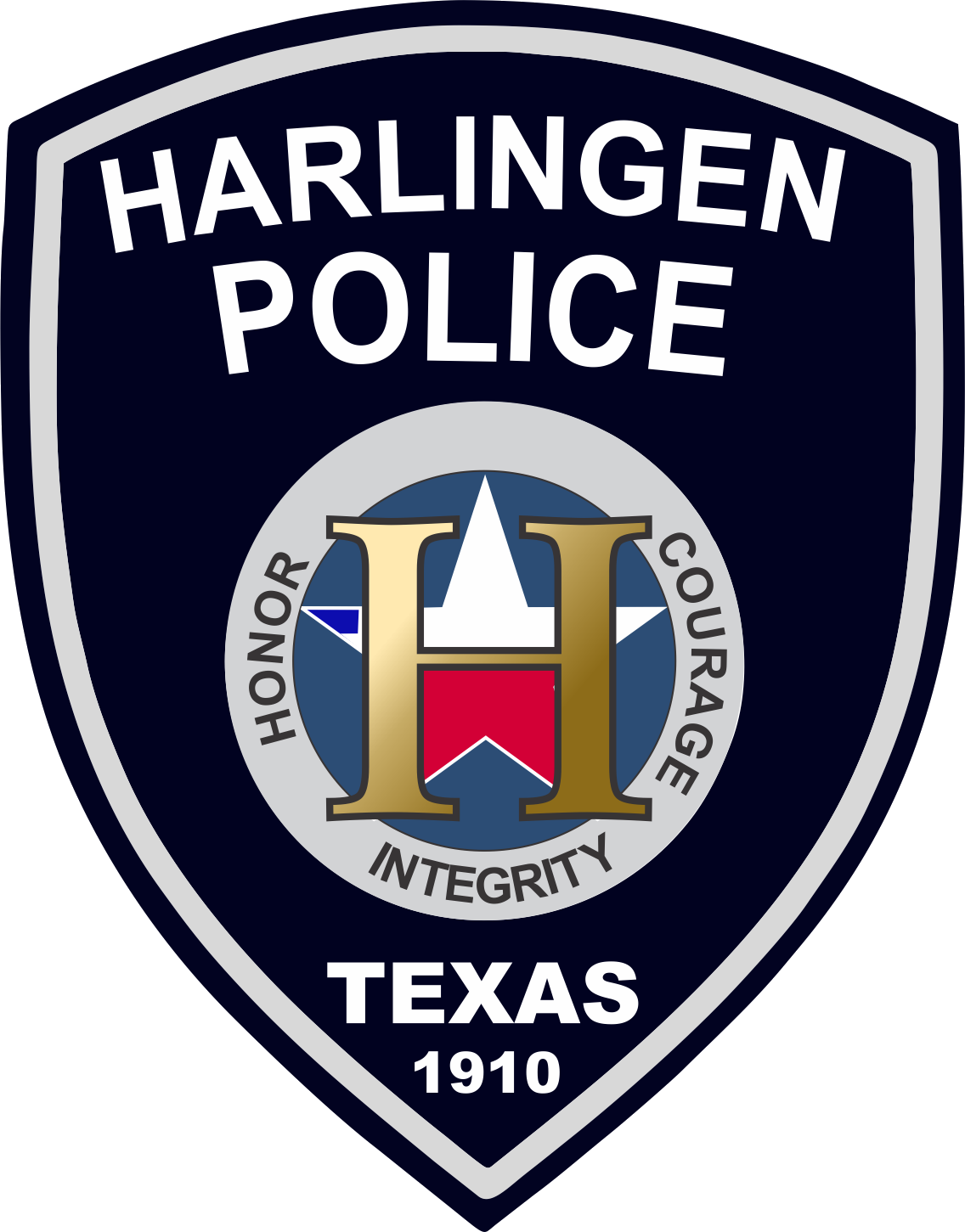
Harlingen Police patch

The Harlingen Police Department embraces the community policing philosophy. The police force consists of nearly 160 sworn police officers. The department receives more than 50,000 911 calls per year. The department's Mission Statement is, "It is the mission of the Harlingen Police Department to provide services with integrity and dedication, to preserve life, to enforce the law, and to work in partnership with the community to enhance the quality of life in the City of Harlingen."

=== State government ===
The Texas Department of Criminal Justice operates the Harlingen Parole Office in Harlingen.

=== Federal representation ===
The United States Postal Service operates two post offices in Harlingen, including the Harlingen Post Office and the Downtown Harlingen post office.

==== U.S. Department of Justice ====
Harlingen is home to the U.S. Immigration Court, one of 52 such courts in the U.S. that adjudicate immigration cases in the United States. The chief function of the Immigration Court is to conduct removal proceedings, which are administrative proceedings to determine the removability of noncitizens present within the United States.

==== U.S. Homeland Security Agencies ====
The United States Border Patrol Harlingen Station is located at 3902 S. Expressway 77 Harlingen, Texas.

==== Military installations ====
The Harlingen Armed Forces Reserve Center (AFRC) is located at 1300 Fair Park Blvd, Harlingen, Texas. This facility hosts Reserve components of the United States Armed Forces units from the United States Army Reserve 319th Combat Sustainment Support Battalion, 4th Team, 1st Judge Advocate General Detachment, 5th Team, 1st Judge Advocate General Detachment, and 812th Quartermaster Company (Supply). The United States Navy Reserve Navy Operations Support Center Harlingen (NOSC Harlingen) and the United States Marine Corps Reserve Charlie Company (Det) 1st Battalion 23rd Marines 4th Marine Division. This facility is mostly used for monthly drills. A Military Retiree Activities Office is located at the Harlingen AFRC.

== Education ==
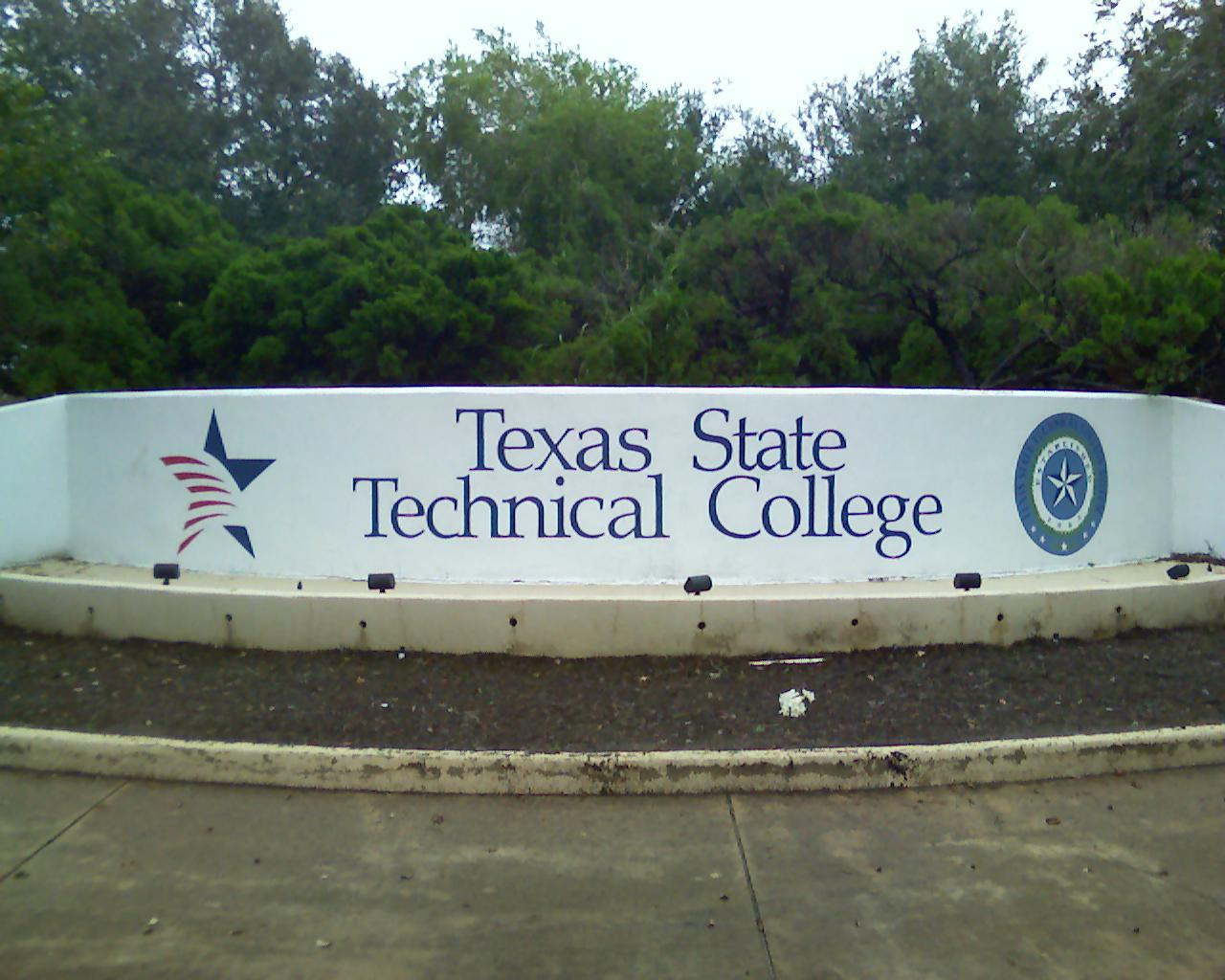
The entrance to the Harlingen branch of the Texas State Technical College in 2008

=== Primary and secondary education ===
The city is covered by the Harlingen Consolidated Independent School District and South Texas Independent School District. Harlingen is home to four high schools – Harlingen Collegiate High (formerly Early College High School before its deal with UTRGV), Harlingen High School, Harlingen High School South, and Harlingen School of Health Professions, and a freshman Academy, Dr. Abraham P. Cano Freshman Academy. The Saint Anthony Catholic School is a parochial school for grades K–8 (with a Montessori program for 3- and 4-year-olds). It is one of the few Catholic schools in the city of Harlingen and has an enrollment of approximately 220 students.

The Marine Military Academy is a private, all-male, college preparatory school located in Harlingen.

=== Universities and colleges ===
In 1967, a branch of Texas State Technical College was established in Harlingen. The two-year technical state college currently offers more than 30 programs to over 5,000 students.

In 2002, the University of Texas Health Science Center at San Antonio opened the Regional Academic Health Center (RAHC) Medical Education Division in Harlingen. In 2012, the UT System Board of Regents approved the merger of the University of Texas at Brownsville and the University of Texas-Pan American to form the University of Texas Rio Grande Valley (UTRGV) and the University of Texas Rio Grande Valley School of Medicine, the latter using resources from the RAHC.

The University of Texas Rio Grande Valley School of Medicine welcomed its first students in the summer of 2016. UTRGV's psychiatry program and Institute for Neurosciences are based in Harlingen.

Southern Careers Institute has a campus located in Harlingen as well.

== Sports and recreation ==
Most recently, Harlingen was the home of the Rio Grande Valley WhiteWings, a minor league baseball team that existed from 1994 to 2003 and from 2006 to 2015. In 2000, the WhiteWings won the Texas-Louisiana League championship. Previously, Harlingen was home to the Harlingen Capitals, who were members of the Class D Rio Grande Valley League (1950) and Class B Gulf Coast League (1951–1953). Earlier, the Harlingen Ladds were members of the Rio Grande Valley League (1931) and the Harlingen Hubs were members of the Texas Valley League (1938). The Rio Grande Valley Giants, based in Harlingen, played in the Class AA Texas League (1960–1961) as an affiliate of the San Francisco Giants. Baseball Hall of Fame inductee Gaylord Perry played for the Rio Grande Valley Giants in 1960. In 1976, the Rio Grande Valley WhiteWings played as members of the Gulf States League and the Harlingen Suns (1977) played in the Lone Star League. Beginning in 1950, all Harlingen teams played at Harlingen Field.

Valley Race Park is a racetrack for Greyhound dogs. It was the first Greyhound track in Texas to accept parimutuel wagering. The facility is fully air-conditioned and the grandstands totals over 80,000 square feet (7,400 m^{2}). The grandstand has over 400 monitors to pick up the 50-plus Simulcast Live Racing signals from the top Greyhound and horse tracks from all around the United States. Valley Race Park shut down in the fall of 1995, but reopened five years later, in the spring of 2000.

The World Birding Center (Harlingen Arroyo Colorado) has a location in Harlingen's Hugh Ramsey Nature Park. Work continues on designs for a new 7,250-square-foot (674 m^{2}) visitors' center at Hugh Ramsey Nature Park. The two-story center will include a gift shop, observation tower, meeting rooms, and enclosed viewing areas. Also, visitors at both Ramsey Park and the Thicket will find parking and extensive trails, as well as maps, information, and public restrooms.

The Rio Grande Valley Birding Festival occurs each November in Harlingen, attracting up to 3,000 participants per year. In 2018, the multi-day festival celebrated its 25th year, drawing 600 participants in guided birding tours, 80 to 90 paid guides, and 100 volunteers. 10,000-capacity

J. Lewis Boggus Stadium has an all-weather artificial playing surface and is located in downtown Harlingen. It is used for football, soccer, and other outdoor athletic events.

== Healthcare ==
Harlingen Medical Center (HMC) is a nationally recognized general acute-care hospital. HMC medical services include: bariatric, cardiac surgery, cardiology, emergency, gastroenterology, imaging services, internal medicine, neurology, obstetrics and gynecology, orthopedics, orthopedic surgery, pediatrics, sleep apnea treatment, vascular and endovascular surgery, and wound-healing care. The facility opened in October 2002 and has 112 beds.

Valley Baptist Medical Center (VBMC), with 586 beds, is the Rio Grande Valley's only Level II Trauma Center. With a 38-room emergency department and a heliport, Valley Baptist serves as the lead trauma center in the region, and is the only hospital in the area offering comprehensive stroke services, including advanced endovascular neurology procedures. Valley Baptist has the only newborn intensive-care unit in Harlingen, the only pediatric intensive-care unit in Cameron County, private labor/delivery/recovery suites, a family-centered maternity-care unit, women's surgery suites, day surgery, and outpatient services. In addition, Valley Baptist has a diabetes-education program, and a wound-care center and foot-care institute, and a surgical and medical weight-loss program.

Solara Specialty Hospital Harlingen is a long-term acute-care facility where patients can receive treatment for as long as a month, compared to general hospitals where patients are treated for shorter periods. The 41–bed hospital is owned by Solara Healthcare of Dallas, Valley Baptist Health System, and local physicians.

The Regional Academic Health Center is a teaching hospital that serves as an extension campus of the University of Texas Health Science Center at San Antonio.

Su Clinica Familiar offers services tailored to the border region, concentrating in the areas of dentistry, internal medicine, women's health, and pediatrics. Services are mostly tailored for the poor. It has a teaching partnership with the nearby Regional Academic Health Center.

The Harlingen VA Outpatient Clinic and VA Health Care Center are two Veteran Administration (VA) facilities in Harlingen. Both of these facilities fall under the VA Texas Valley Coastal Bend Health Care System.

The Harlingen Ambulatory Surgery and Specialty Outpatient Center opened in January 2011 and provides care to veterans. Orthopedics, urology, gastroenterology, otolaryngology, infectious disease, dermatology, cardiology, oncology, neurology, rheumatology, amputee/prosthetics, and endoscopy services are offered.

The Rio Grande State Center offers outpatient medical healthcare and in-patient mental health services. The center's psychiatric hospital is a 55-bed, in-patient facility and the long-term program is a 75-bed, residential facility. The outpatient medical clinic provides out-patient services which including primary care, women's health, diagnostic services, psychiatric consults and prescription assistance.

A Ronald McDonald House opened in 1998. It offers a place to stay for families of children being treated for serious illness or injury. It is funded by private donations, grants, and fundraising events.

Palms Behavioral Health, a 94-bed mental and behavioral health facility which opened in Harlingen in 2016.

== Transportation ==
=== Airports ===
The city's airport, Valley International Airport, has a service area that encompasses the lower Rio Grande Valley and northern Mexico, serving more than two million people on both sides of the US-Mexico border. Valley International Airport lies in the northeastern portion of Harlingen and offers a border-crossing option via the Free Trade Bridge at Los Indios. The airport has aligned itself as the air cargo hub of the Rio Grande Valley and works closely with carriers such as DHL, FedEx and Southwest Airlines Cargo. In 1975, Southwest Airlines began to fly to the Rio Grande Valley via Valley International Airport with four roundtrips each business day. Southwest currently offers nonstop flights between Harlingen and Austin and Houston Hobby. Additional airlines that serve the airport include United Express to Houston Intercontinental, American Airlines with daily nonstop service to Dallas DFW, Frontier Airlines with weekly nonstop service to Chicago and Denver, and Delta Air Lines and Sun Country Airlines with seasonal, nonstop service to Minneapolis-St. Paul.

=== Public transit ===
The city is working to build a public transit center as a hub for bus lines to Harlingen. The project is currently on hold due to funding issues.

=== Highways ===
The city of Harlingen is at the junction of U.S. Route 77 and U.S. Route 83, designated as Interstate 69E and Interstate 2, respectively. Interstate 69E runs through north–south through Harlingen, while the city serves as the eastern terminus of Interstate 2. U.S. Route 77 connects the Rio Grande Valley to Interstate 37 at Corpus Christi. U.S. Route 83 connects the Rio Grande Valley with Interstate 35 at Laredo.

=== International trade bridges ===
The Free Trade Bridge at Los Indios is a state-of-the-art international bridge located just 10 miles (16 km) south of Harlingen. With a full U.S. Customs inspection facility that accommodates up to 75 trucks simultaneously, the Free Trade Bridge is acclaimed as the most time-efficient border crossing in the valley. The bridge accesses a four-lane highway in northern Mexico, offering a fast route to the border cities of Matamoros and Reynosa, as well as the industrial city of Monterrey. With the completion of Mexico's State of Tamaulipas new 'autopista', the Free Trade Bridge will provide a seamless highway connection for more efficient distribution of industrial products to and from interior Mexico.

=== Ports ===
The Port of Harlingen is located 4 mi (6.4 km) east of Harlingen on Highway 106. It is 25 mi (40 km) west of mile marker 646 on the Gulf Intracoastal Waterway, which stretches from the Mexican border at Brownsville, along the entire coast of the Gulf of Mexico to St. Marks, Florida. The Gulf Intracoastal Waterway provides over 1,300 miles (2,100 km) of protected waterway, 12 ft (3.7 m) deep and 125 ft (38 m) wide. The Harlingen Channel is maintained to a width of 125 feet (38 m) and a depth of 12 ft (3.7 m) and is supplied by the Arroyo Colorado, a freshwater river.

=== Railroads ===
Union Pacific Railroad has a local terminal and switching yard in Harlingen. The Harlingen Industrial Parks and Port of Harlingen have direct rail access. Harlingen has a rich history as a railroad town. The Southern Pacific depot has been razed, but it was one of four SP depots in the Rio Grande Valley (the others are Brownsville, now a museum; McAllen, now a law office; and Edinburg, now the home of the Chamber of Commerce).

Harlingen was served by the Missouri Pacific Railroad night train on a Houston, Texas-Brownsville, Texas route, the Pioneer (#315/316) until 1964 and day train on that route, the Valley Eagle (#321/322) until 1962.

== Culture and points of interest ==
The Harlingen Public Library serves local residents.

- Harlingen Arts and Heritage Museum
- Harlingen Performing Arts Theater
- Iwo Jima Memorial & Museum
- Hugh Ramsey Nature Park

== Media and journalism ==
=== Newspapers ===
- Valley Morning Star
- The Brownsville Herald
- The Monitor

=== Television ===
- XHTAM-TV (Channel 2 Televisa/Matamoros Mexico, McAllen, Harlingen-Brownsville)
- KGBT-TV (Channel 4, Harlingen, Texas, licensee: Mission Broadcasting, Inc., The CW Affiliate)
- KRGV-TV (Channel 5, Weslaco, Texas, licensee: Mobile Video Tapes, Inc., ABC affiliate)
- XHAB-TV (Channel 8 Televisa/Matamoros Mexico, McAllen, Harlingen-Brownsville)
- XERV-TV (Channel 9 Televisa/Matamoros Mexico, McAllen, Harlingen-Brownsville)
- XHREY-TV (Channel 1 TV AZTECA NORESTE/Reynosa Mexico, Rio Grande City-McAllen-Weslaco)
- XHOR-TV (Channel 7 TV AZTECA NORESTE/Reynosa Mexico, Rio Grande City-McAllen-Weslaco)
- KHGN-TV (Cable Channel 17, Harlingen, Texas, operator: Harlingen Consolidated independent school District, Public Relations Office.)
- KVEO (Channel 23, Brownsville, Texas, licensee: Nexstar Media Group, NBC/CBS affiliate)
- KTLM (Channel 40, Rio Grande City, Texas, licensee: NBCUniversal Telemundo Station Group, Telemundo owned and operated station)
- KNVO (Channel 48, McAllen, Texas, licensee: Entravision Holdings, LLC., Univision affiliate)
- XHVTV-TV (Channel 6 Multimedios TV/Reynosa/Matamoros Mexico, McAllen-Weslaco/ Harlingen-Brownsville)
- KFXV (Channel 60, Harlingen, Texas, licensee: RGV Educational Broadcasting, Inc. FOX)

=== Radio ===
FM

- KHID 88.1 FM PBS/NPR
- KBNR 88.3 FM Radio Manantial (Spanish Christian)
- KOIR Radio Esperanza 88.5 (Spanish Christian)
- KJJF 88.9 FM PBS/NPR
- XHMLS 91.3 FM (Top-40)
- KTER 90.7 FM (Religious)
- KCAS The New 91.5 / "Know Christ As Savior" (English Traditional Christian ad Southern Gospel)
- KESO 92.7 FM (Spanish)
- KFRQ Q94.5 (Classic/Modern/Hard Rock)
- KBTQ Recuerdo 96.1 FM (Mexican Oldies)
- KVMV Family Friendly & Commercial Free 96.9 FM (Adult Contemporary Christian)
- KGBT-FM Solamente Exitos 98.5 FM (Mexican Norteña)
- KKPS Fuego 99.5 FM (Puro Trancazos)
- KTEX South Texas Country 100.3 FM (Country)
- KNVO-FM Jose 101.1 FM (Spanish Hits)
- KBUC 102.1 FM Super Tejano (Tejano)
- KBFM Wild 104.1 FM (Hip-Hop/R&B)
- KJAV Life Radio 104.9 (Christian AC)
- KQXX 105.5 FM Kiss 105.5 (Hot AC)
- KBIC 105.7 FM (Spanish)
- XHNA 105.9 FM (Spanish)
- KHKZ Kiss 106.3 FM (Hot AC)
- KVLY 107.9 RGV FM (AC)

AM

- KURV 710 AM Talk
- KVJY 840 AM Spanish Pop
- KRIO 910 AM Spanish
- KUBR 1210 AM Spanish
- KSOX 1240 AM Spanish
- KRGE 1290 AM Spanish
- XERDO 1060 AM Spanish Talk
- XEMS 1490 AM Spanish
- KGBT 1530 AM Spanish
- KIRT 1580 AM Spanish
- KVNS 1700 AM Fox Sports

== Notable people ==
- Gloria E. Anzaldúa (1942–2004), writer
- Leo Araguz (born 1970), American football player
- Thomas Haden Church (born 1960), actor
- Parker Coppins, YouTuber
- Danielle Doty (born 1993), Miss Texas Teen USA 2011, Miss Teen USA 2011
- Carlos Elizondo, event planner and political aide
- Cayetano Garza (born 1972), cartoonist
- Bill Haley (1925–1981), rock and roll musician
- Gina Haley (born 1975), singer-songwriter
- Harry Holt, professional football player
- Rose Wilder Lane (1886–1968), journalist, travel writer, novelist, political theorist, and daughter of American writer Laura Ingalls Wilder
- Bobby Morrow (1935–2020), American sprinter who won three gold medals at the 1956 Olympics
- Harry Nyquist (1889–1976), electronics engineer
- Emmy Ruiz, political advisor
- Nick Stahl (born 1979), actor
- Jeffrey Thompson (born 1963), Idaho state representative
- Blanca Vela (1936–2014), first female mayor of Brownsville, Texas (1999–2003), born and raised in Harlingen
- Filemon Vela Jr., U.S. Representative
- Larry Warner (1943–2022), lawyer and politician
- Randy Williams (born 1975), former Major League Baseball and Nippon Professional Baseball player
- Kim Young (born 1955), professional golfer
