= Joanne Heyler =

American museum director and curator

Joanne Heyler (born 1964 or 1965) is the founding director and president of the Broad Museum in Los Angeles, California in the United States. She is also the director and chief curator at the Broad Art Foundation, which is a contemporary art lending library.

== Early life ==
Heyler grew up in Los Angeles. She received a bachelor's degree in art history from Scripps College and a master's degree in art history at Courtauld Institute of Art at the University of London.

== Broad Foundation and Broad Museum ==
Heyler joined the Broad Foundation as an assistant curator in 1989 and became its director in 1994.

She oversaw the development, construction, curation and opening of the Broad Museum.

Heyler is noted for her longevity at one institution. Lisa Dennison, former director of the Guggenheim Museum in New York, said "That’s why she’s so valuable to Eli [Broad] and Edye [Broad]...I don’t think they could have achieved their goals — as well as the public purpose of the collection — without someone as steadfast, trusted, loyal and smart as Joanne.”
