= Rivera High School =

Rivera High School can refer to:

- Simon Rivera High School - Brownsville, Texas - Brownsville Independent School District
- Diego Rivera Learning Complex - Los Angeles, California - Los Angeles Unified School District
