= Keith Haring: Art Is for Everybody =

2023 exhibition at The Broad

Keith Haring: Art Is for Everybody was a 2023 exhibition of works by American artist Keith Haring held at The Broad in Los Angeles. The exhibition featured more than 120 works across multiple media and surveyed Haring's career and visual language.

== Reception ==
The exhibition received coverage from publications including the Los Angeles Times, which described Haring's work as combining pictographic imagery with an "agitated urban edge".
