= Andrea Rich =

Andrea Louise Beck Rich was an art museum director and academic administrator. She was director of the Los Angeles County Museum of Art from 1995 to 2005.

== Early life and education ==
Andrea Louise Beck was born on July 20, 1943, in San Diego to clothing store owners Leo and Ida Beck.

She received three academic degrees from UCLA: a B.A. degree (1965), a master of arts degree (1966) and a Ph.D. (1968).

== Career ==
She took a position as an assistant professor in the speech department at UCLA in 1968 and went on to hold several administrative positions before being appointed executive vice chancellor by then-Chancellor Charles E. Young in 1991.

She left UCLA in 1995 to become president and chief executive officer of the Los Angeles County Museum of Art (LACMA), where she worked for 10 years.

Rich received a distinguished teaching award in 1974, awarded by the UCLA Alumni Association.

== LACMA ==
During her 10 years leading LACMA, Rich was credited with doubling the museum’s endowment to more than $100 million.

As LACMA director she tried to restrain the ambitions and aggression of Eli Broad, but only succeeded in having him organize against her. She resigned shortly following his efforts.

== Personal life ==
She married John Rich in 1966, while she was in graduate school. He was an Emmy-winning director and producer of television situation comedies such as “All in the Family” and “The Dick Van Dyke Show.” Their first son, Anthony, was born in 1968, shortly before Andrea received her doctorate; then came Robert, in 1970. The couple separated in 1985 and later divorced.

== Death ==
Rich died in July 2014 of leukemia and at Ronald Reagan UCLA Medical Center.
