= Broad Prize for Urban Education =

The Broad Prize for Urban Education recognized school districts in urban areas for closing the achievement gap and improving the academic performance of low-income and minority students. It was sponsored by the foundation of philanthropists Eli Broad and Edythe Broad, and included $500,000 in college scholarships to graduates from the winning district. The prize was offered from 2002–2014. The prize was suspended as the foundation redirected its resources toward funding charter schools.

== Recipients ==
The winners were:

- 2002 Houston Independent School District, Texas
- 2003 Long Beach Unified School District, California
- 2004 Garden Grove Unified School District, California
- 2005 Norfolk Public Schools, Virginia
- 2006 Boston Public Schools, Massachusetts
- 2007 New York City Department of Education, New York
- 2008 Brownsville Independent School District, Texas
- 2009 Aldine Independent School District, Texas
- 2010 Gwinnett County Public Schools, Georgia
- 2011 Charlotte-Mecklenburg Schools, North Carolina
- 2012 Miami-Dade County Public Schools, Florida
- 2013 Houston Independent School District, Texas
- 2014 Gwinnett County Public Schools, Georgia
- 2014 Orange County Public Schools, Florida
