= Jim Pace =

Jim or James Pace may refer to:

- Jim Pace (American football) (1936–1983), American football running back
- Jim Pace (racing driver) (1961–2020), American racing driver
- James O. Pace
- James Pace Early College High School
