= Eli and Edythe Broad Art Museum =

Art museum in East Lansing, Michigan, United States

The Broad Art Museum
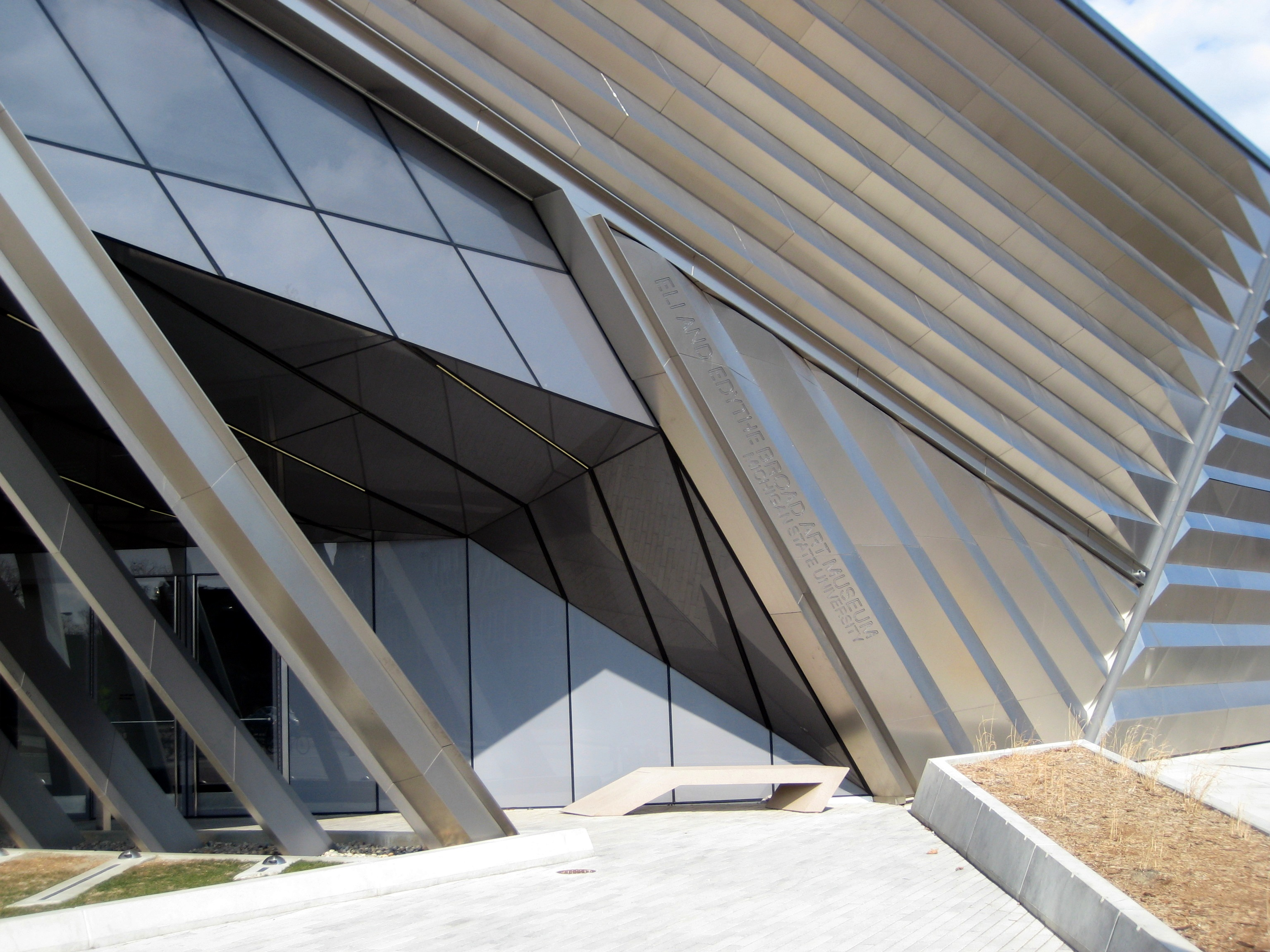
- East entrance of the MSU Broad
- Established: November 2012
- Location: 547 East Circle Drive, East Lansing, Michigan
- Coordinates: 42°43′57.88″N 84°28′36.29″W
- Type: Contemporary Art Museum
- Collection size: 10,000+
- Visitors: 63,257 (2018); 48,500 (2021)
- Director: Steven L. Bridges (interim)
- Parking: MSU campus parking lots 7 & 8 and the Grand River parking structure
- Website: broadmuseum.msu.edu

The Eli and Edythe Broad Art Museum (MSU Broad or BAM) is a nonprofit, contemporary art museum designed by Zaha Hadid located on the campus of Michigan State University in East Lansing, Michigan, United States. It opened on November 10, 2012.

The rotating exhibition schedule allows for frequent new shows to be on view. The museum's curatorial focus is a global focus on emerging to mid-career artists. Exhibitions consist largely of contemporary artists, including those achieving their Master of Fine Arts degree at Michigan State University, as well as shows of selected works from the collection. The MSU Broad organizes a few hundred programs for various ages, open to all at no charge. Admission to the galleries and all community events and programs is free for all visitors, with only certain special exhibitions charging admissions fees.

The museum is named for Eli and Edythe Broad, whose initial leading gift of $26 million to establish the MSU Broad was announced in June 2007. The museum's permanent collection of over 10,000 pieces includes more than 7,500 inherited from the Kresge Art Museum, MSU's former art museum, when it closed, representing a wide array of artistic production from the ancient to the present, across the world, in a variety of media. Significant holdings include Ancient Greek and Roman antiquities; pre-Columbian sculptures and vessels; Medieval and Renaissance illuminations; Old Master paintings; 19th-century American paintings; 20th-century sculpture by artists such as Alexander Calder and Jenny Holzer; and works by contemporary artists such as Chuck Close and Ann Hamilton. A selection of works from the permanent collection, rotating three times a year, is on display in the museum's Center for Object Research and Engagement (The CORE), which opened in November 2023. Current emphasis in collection growth and new acquisitions is on "the art of our time," incorporating "ongoing efforts to rewrite [...] collecting practices and priorities to focus primarily on artists of color, women artists, and other groups historically underrepresented in and undervalued by the study of art history in western cultures."

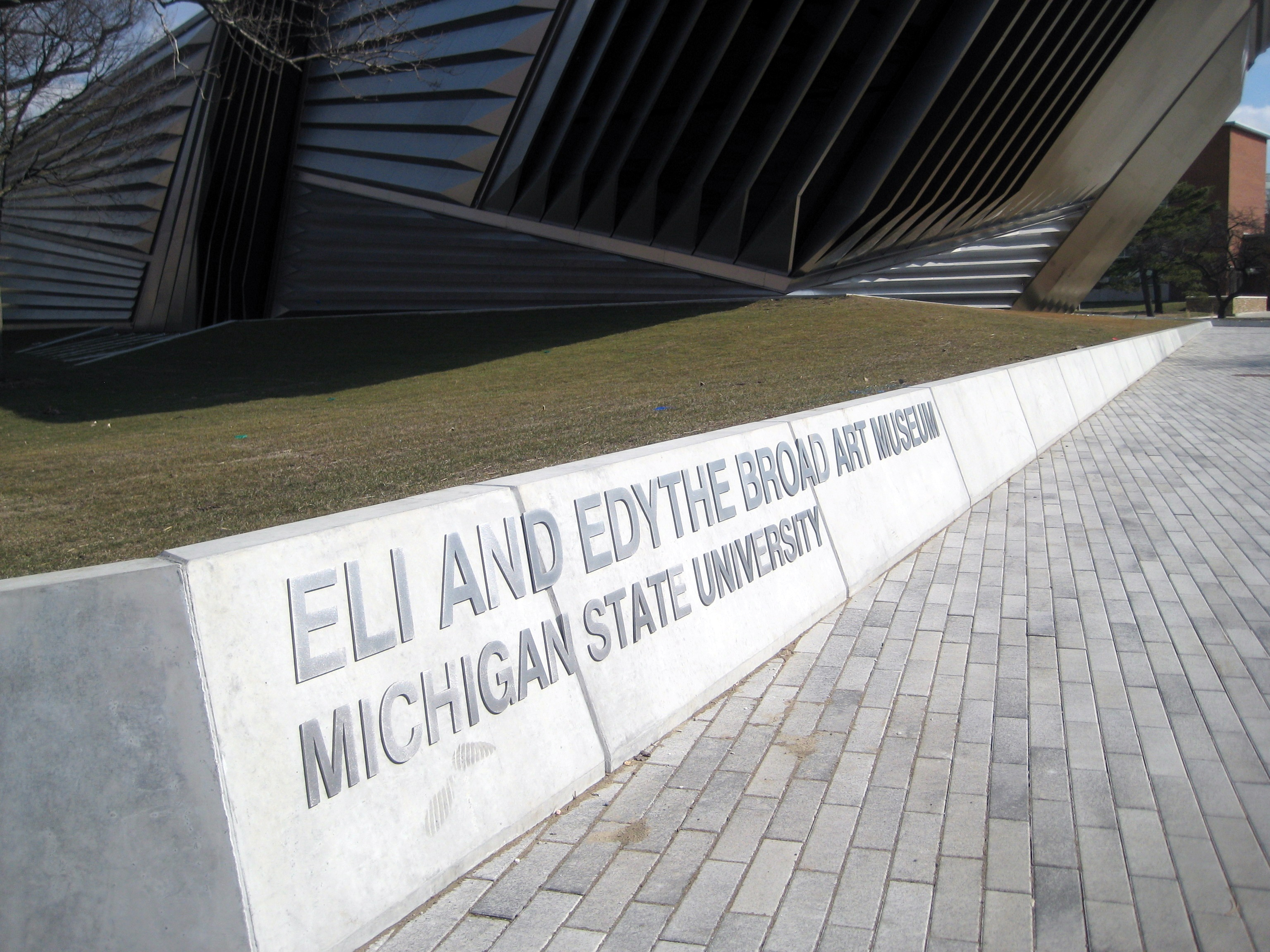
Nameplate on the northeast side

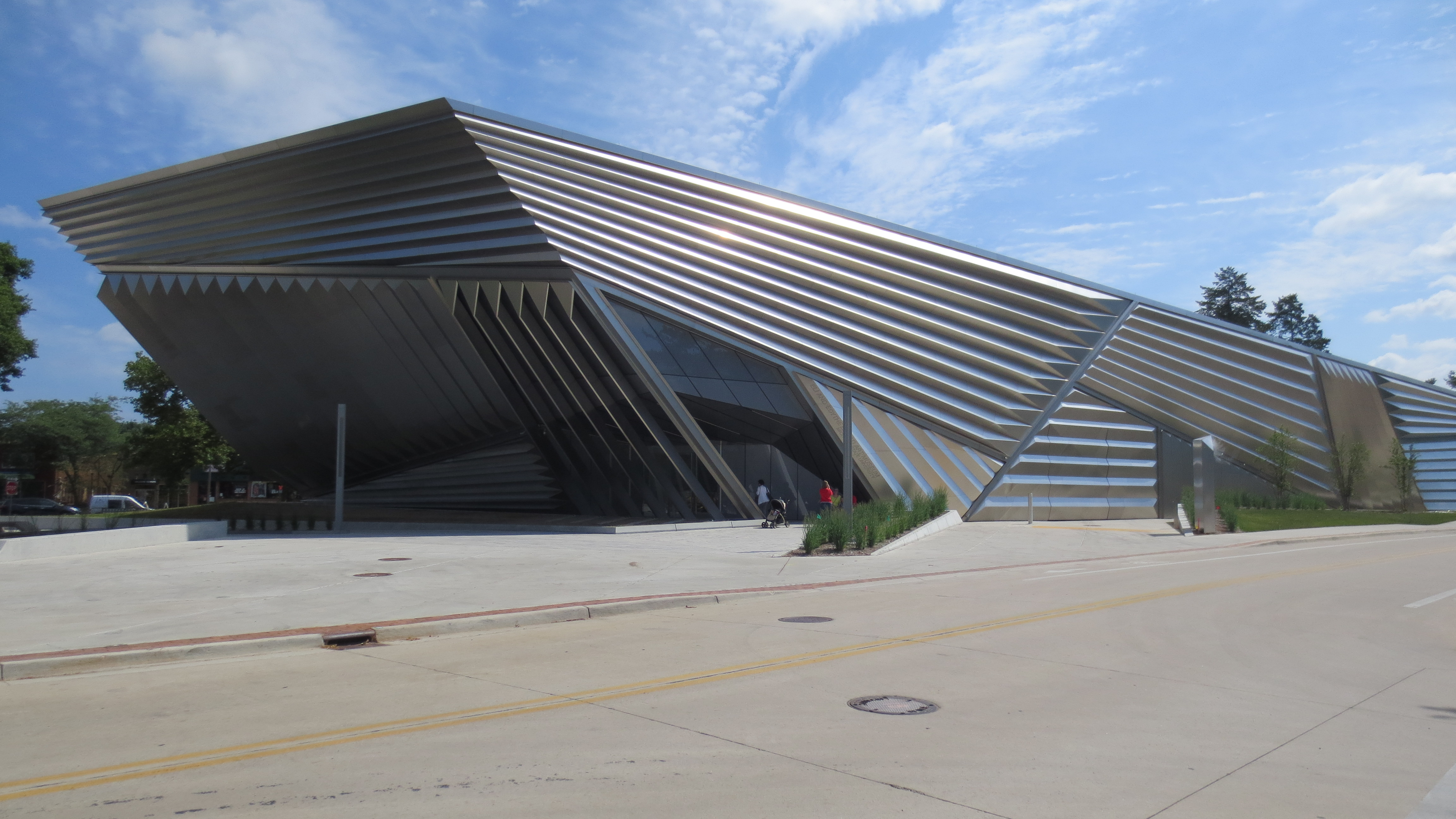
South side of the museum

The MSU Broad Art Museum was a location for filming portions of the movie Batman v Superman: Dawn of Justice in October 2014.

== Architecture ==
=== Description ===
Designed by architect Zaha Hadid, the Broad Art Museum's iconic design is constructed of steel and concrete with a pleated stainless steel and glass exterior. The structural system combines steel framing, concrete shear, and bearing walls. The floors are structural concrete, finished as polished concrete and wood in the galleries. The exterior is a rain-screen system consisting of sheathed steel framing clad with folding and pleated stainless steel panels. There is a high-performance glazing for the windows, doors, and skylights. 70% of the 46,000 square feet (4,300 m^{2}) is dedicated to exhibition space including non-traditional spaces such as the Education Wing and the Benefactor's Gallery. Public movement and circulation areas of the building are marked through the use of architectural concrete. The movement within and between the gallery spaces is fluid and designed to be affected by other visitors. The MSU Broad is composed of three levels: lower, ground (main), and second with its highest point at approximately 38 feet on the west side (Minskoff Gallery), sloping to about 24 feet on the east side (Education Wing). Its layout is centered around the floating staircase with the galleries branching out from it. The second-level spaces provide dramatic views of both campus and downtown East Lansing. It is adjoined by an outdoor sculpture garden as an extension of the east entrance courtyard and by a pedestrian plaza at the west entrance. Other spaces include administration offices and a gift shop.

The Broad's design is largely community-focused. The internal galleries and public spaces are positioned to create an intentional exchange between the city, its inhabitants, the museum visitor and the art. A dialog is formed with the town and Grand River Avenue, East Lansing's downtown area, through a visual connectivity between the galleries, plaza, and city. It functions as a gateway between the East Lansing community and campus with its parallel doors connecting campus to the downtown area. The floating staircase echoes the exchange with Grand River Avenue via the two-story glazed window opening. All openings located in the building envelope (the exterior stainless steel pleating) reinforce the physical and visual connectivity and interface between the museum, its visitors, and its context (i.e., the surrounding environment).

== History ==
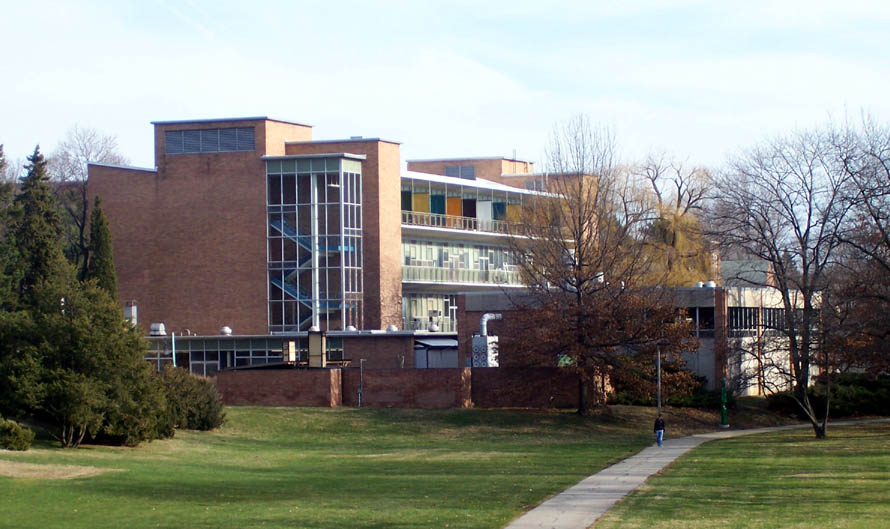
Kresge Art Center

=== Kresge Art Museum ===
Before MSU Broad, art collections were housed by the Kresge Art Museum, located within Michigan State University's art department building, the Kresge Art Center. The Kresge Art Museum traces its roots to the 1930s when the university's art department first started displaying its official art collection in various locations on campus. In 1959 the Kresge Art Center was built, and a space called "the Gallery" was set aside to house the art. This was renamed the Kresge Art Museum in 1984. Susan Bandes was its director 1986-2010.

When the Eli and Edythe Broad Art Museum was completed, the Kresge Art Museum closed permanently. Several thousand art objects went into storage. Many items from this Kresge collection would not be exhibited until MSU Broad opened its Center for Object Research and Engagement (The CORE) in November 2023.

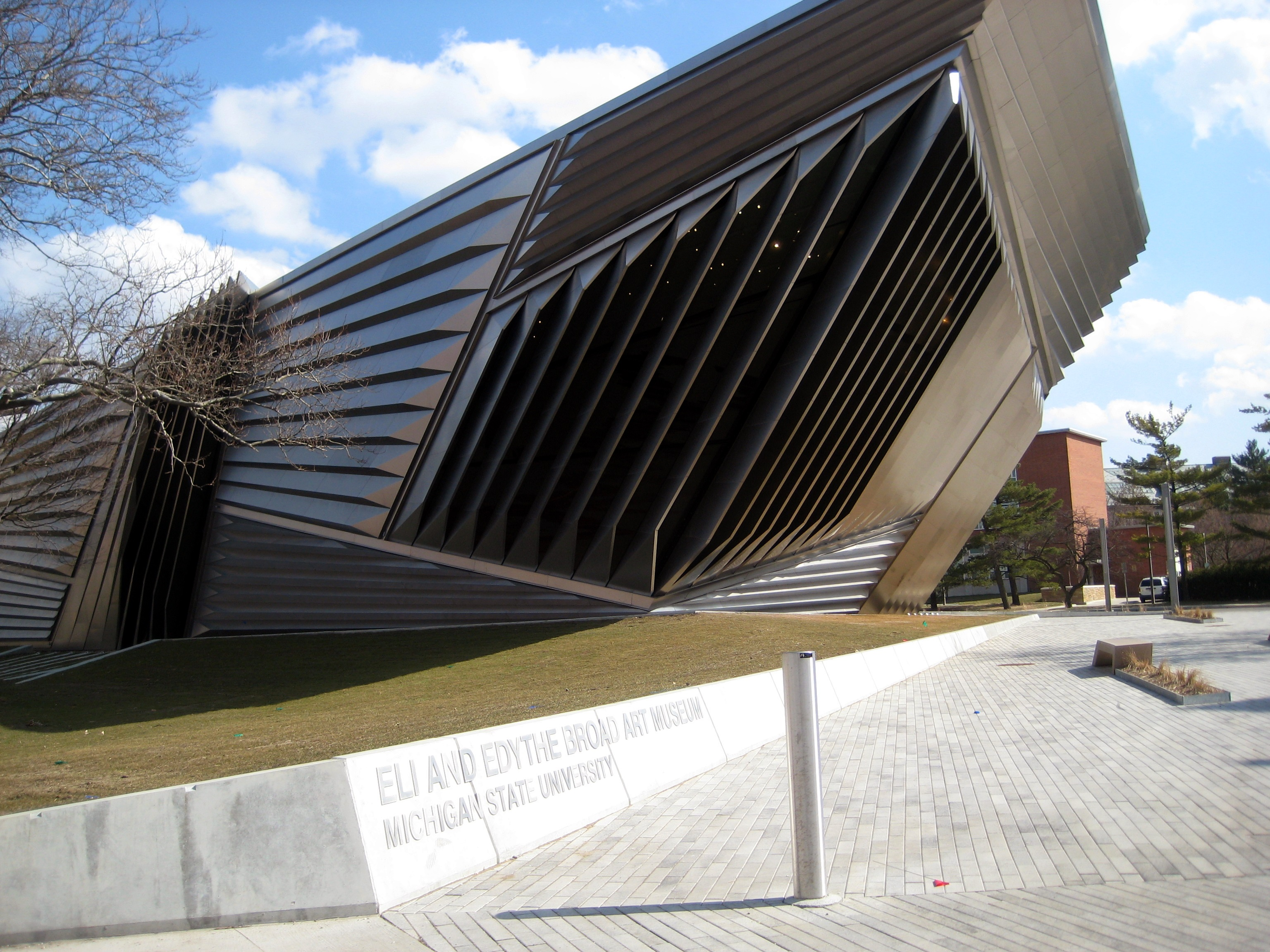
Broad Art Museum from Grand River Ave

=== Conception ===
A committee known as Better Art Museum was formed in 1999 with the goal of creating a new bigger museum.

On June 1, 2007, Michigan State announced a $26 million donation from Michigan State alumnus and Fortune 500 businessman Eli Broad and his wife, philanthropist and art collector Edythe Broad, and The Broad Art Foundation in Los Angeles. The Broads' initial gift, the largest in the university's history, included $18.5 million toward the projected $30 million cost of a new museum, and an additional $7.5 million to fund art acquisitions and endowments for exhibitions and operations. At their June 15 meeting, the MSU Board of Trustees approved the construction of the museum with initial plans to demolish and replace the Kresge Art Center, before plans changed to instead demolish a former part of the MSU School of Home Economics known as the Paolucci Building. This building had been vacated since 2001 since its floorplan made it very inaccessible to persons with disabilities. It had been built in 1946 and was renamed after faculty member Beatrice Paolucci following her death in 1983. It was demolished in 2008 to make room for the new museum.

The building design was chosen through a competition awarding the project to the winning architect, Zaha Hadid. The final cost of the project, including site fees, etc., totaled $40–$45 million. Two additional gifts from the Broads brought their total contribution to $33 million (including capital, acquisitions, and operations funding). Michael Rush was named as the founding director in December 2010. Michael Rush died of pancreatic cancer on March 27, 2015. Marc-Olivier Wahler was named the director on March 9, 2016 and served until January 2019; Mónica Ramirez-Montagut served from July 2020 to July 2022. Steven Bridges has been interim director since July 2022.

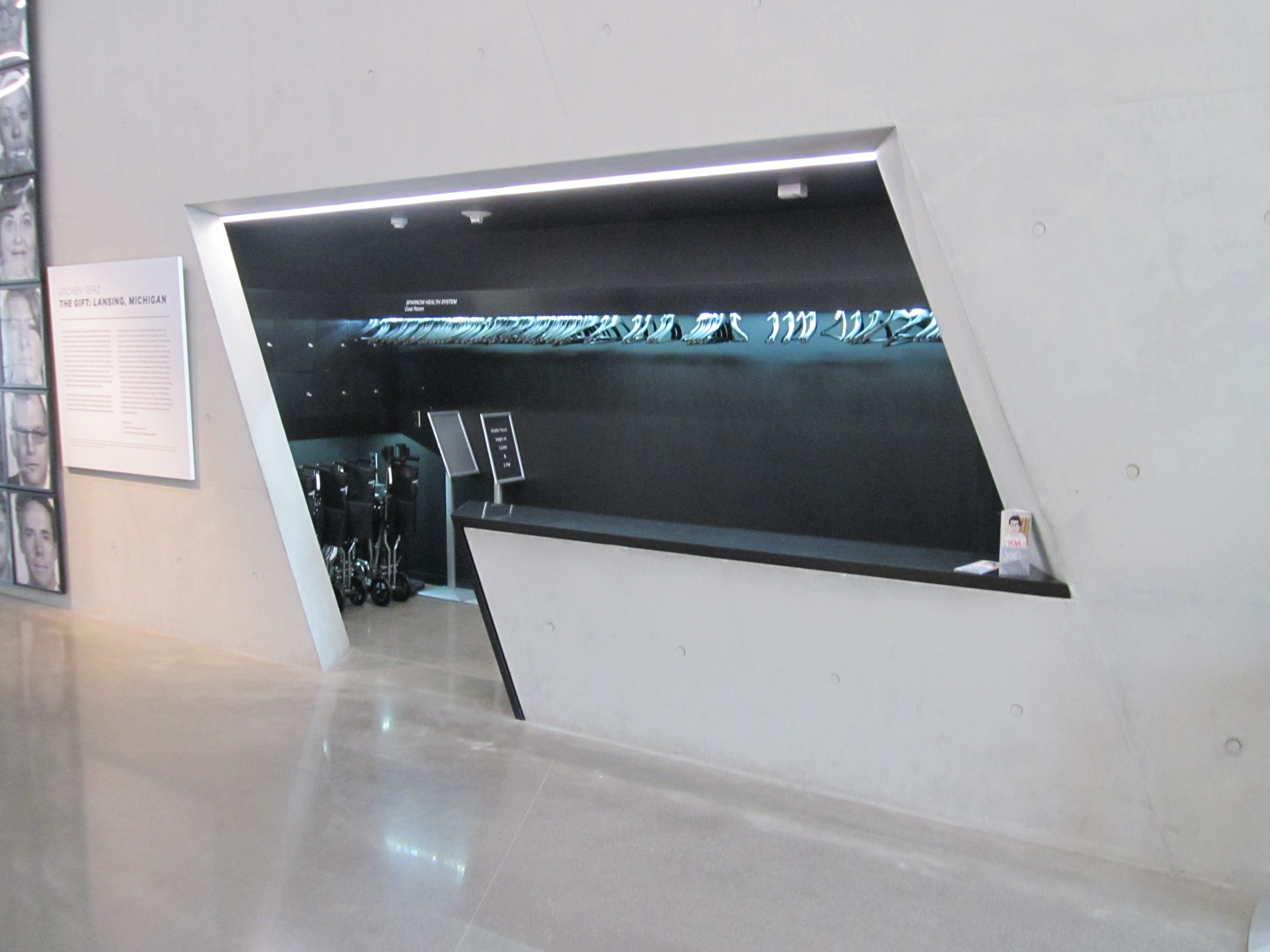
The angular design of the coat room

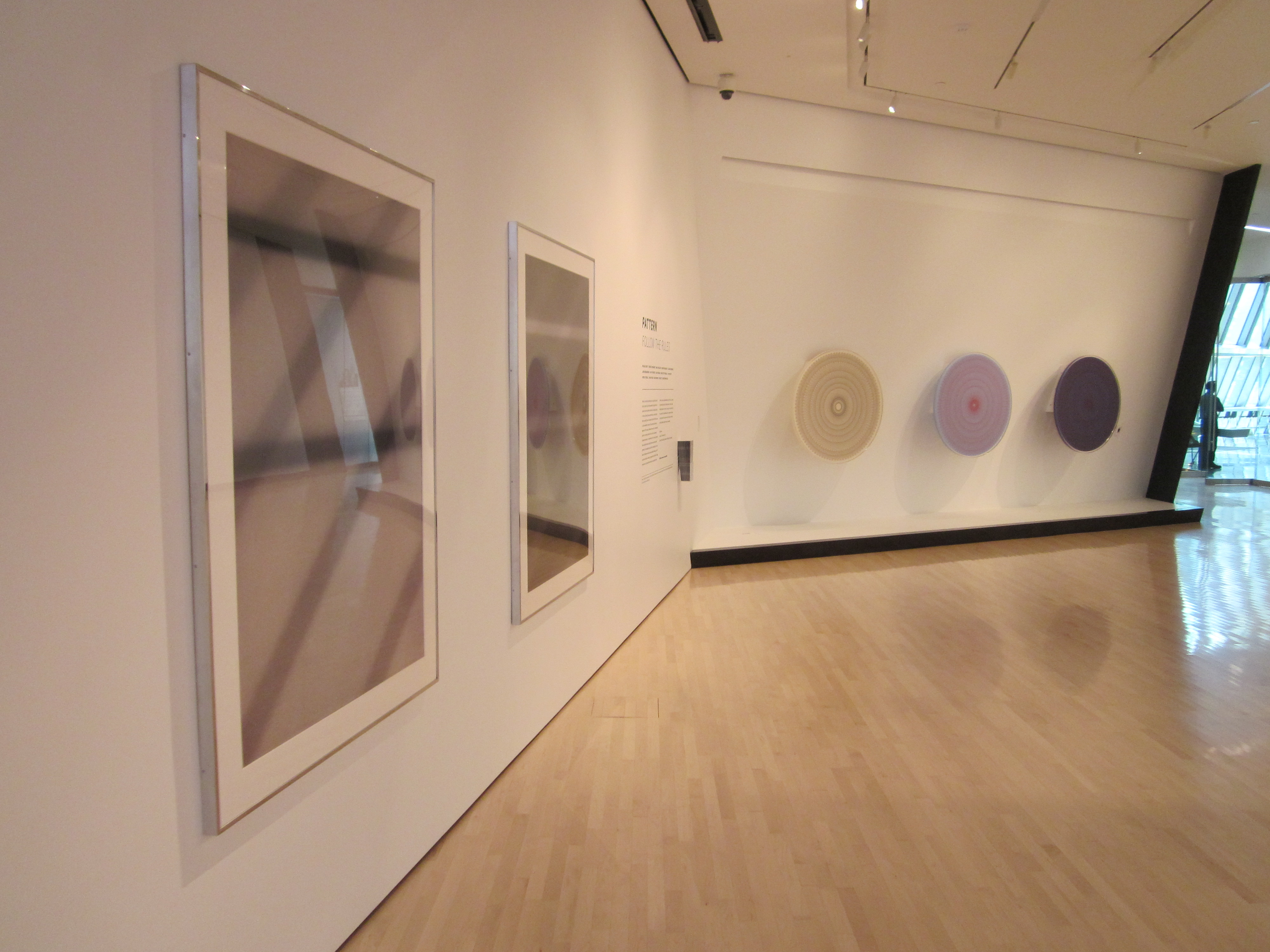
The Minskoff Gallery Berding Gallery

=== Design competition ===
Following the approval of the museum there were initially 10 semifinalist firms identified from a field of approximately 30 firms. From the list of semifinalists, five architectural firms were selected to submit competition proposals. The proposed building was to include a minimum of 26,000 square feet (2,400 m^{2}) of gallery space and would accommodate both permanent and temporary exhibitions. The new facilities would allow MSU's art museum to offer educational opportunities and programming such as lectures by visiting scholars, curators, artists and faculty; seminars, docent training; and special activities for families and school groups. The five finalists were:

- Zaha Hadid – London
- Coop Himmelb(l)au – Vienna/Los Angeles
- Morphosis – Santa Monica
- Kohn Pedersen Fox Associates, PC – New York
- Randall Stout Architects, Inc. – Los Angeles

The selection committee announced on January 15, 2008, that Zaha Hadid had been selected.

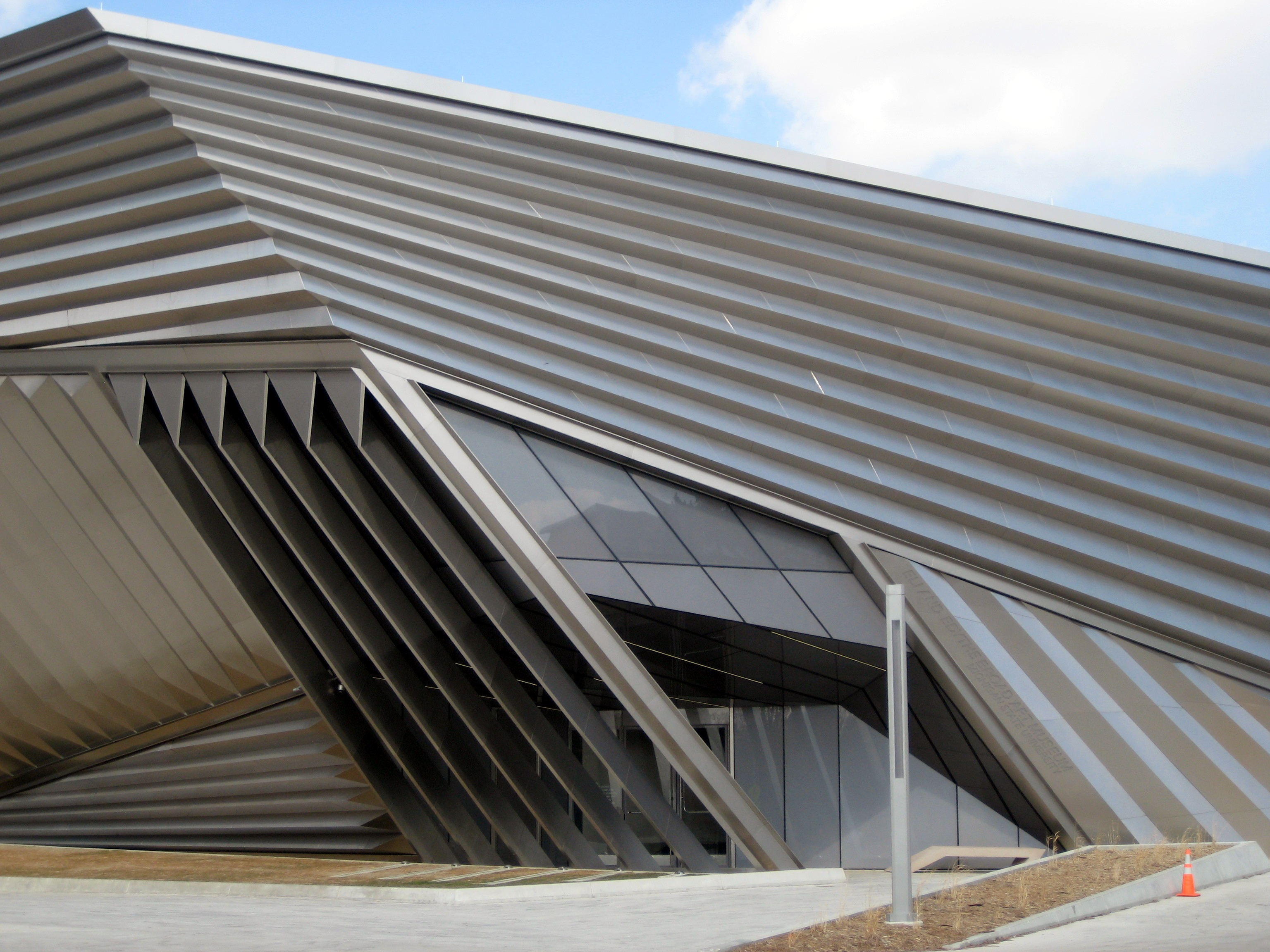
Broad Art Museum from East Circle Drive

=== Construction and opening ===
Construction on the museum began on March 16, 2010, at a groundbreaking ceremony attended by Eli Broad and Zaha Hadid. Its public dedication and official opening took place on November 10, 2012 with over 2,000 people in attendance, including Michigan Governor Rick Snyder and U.S. Senator Debbie Stabenow. An open house the next day attracted over 3,000 visitors. Six thousand people in all attended the three-day opening.

Barton Malow Company from Southfield, MI provided construction management services, using atypical building techniques to ensure constructability given the unique design. The Executive Architect of the building is Integrated Design Solutions from Troy, MI.

The museum achieved LEED Silver certification for its incorporation of sustainable elements in its construction.

The angular facade is composed of pleated stainless steel and glass and was conceived to give the building "an ever-changing appearance that arouses curiosity yet never quite reveals its content." (Zaha Hadid Architects).

== Change in focus ==
The original vision for the Broad Art Museum had it acting as a regional driver of tourism and economic activity. An economic study published by the Anderson Economic Group before its opening projected it to attract 125,000-150,000 visitors annually and to generate approximately $5.75 million per year in new spending into the regional economy.

Attendance peaked at 98,000 in 2013, and former university president Lou Anna Simon acknowledged in May 2025 that the expected economic impact "did not materialize." The Lansing State Journal reported in May 2025 that "[Interim director Stephen] Bridges sees the public being more interested in how the museum is situated in the communities where it resides. The focus of the Broad will now be looking inward toward the university community, instead of outward to the world."
