= South Point, Texas =

- Census-designated place
- Interactive map of South Point, Texas
- Coordinates: 25°52′12″N 97°23′0″W
- Country: United States
- State: Texas
- County: Cameron

Area
  - Total: 1.34 sq mi (3.47 km^{2})
  - Land: 1.29 sq mi (3.33 km^{2})
  - Water: 0.050 sq mi (0.13 km^{2})
- Elevation: 16 ft (5 m)

Population (2020)
  - Total: 1,014
  - Density: 789/sq mi (305/km^{2})
- Time zone: UTC-6 (Central (CST))
  - Summer (DST): UTC-5 (CDT)
- FIPS code: 48-69194
- GNIS feature ID: 1852770

South Point is a census-designated place in Cameron County, Texas, United States. As of the 2020 census, South Point had a population of 1,014. Part of the Brownsville–Harlingen Metropolitan Statistical Area, South Point is the southernmost census designated place in the state of Texas.

== Geography ==
South Point is located in southern Cameron County at 25°52′12″N 97°23′00″W (25.870009, -97.383255). It is located north and west of a bend in the Rio Grande; the bend includes the southernmost point of the river and of Texas, about 2 miles (3 km) south of South Point. South Point is 9 miles (14 km) east of the center of Brownsville.

According to the United States Census Bureau, South Point has a total area of 1.4 square miles (3.5 km^{2}), of which 1.3 square miles (3.3 km^{2}) are land and 0.04 square miles (0.1 km^{2}), or 3.80%, are water.

== Demographics ==
Historical population
Census	Pop.	Note	%±
2000	1,118		—
2010	1,376		23.1%
2020	1,014		−26.3%
U.S. Decennial Census; 1850–1900 1910; 1920 1930 1940; 1950 1960 1970; 1980 1990 2000; 2010

South Point first appeared as a census designated place in the 2000 U.S. census.

=== 2020 census ===
South Point CDP, Texas – Racial and ethnic composition Note: the US Census treats Hispanic/Latino as an ethnic category. This table excludes Latinos from the racial categories and assigns them to a separate category. Hispanics/Latinos may be of any race.
Race / Ethnicity (NH = Non-Hispanic)	Pop 2000	Pop 2010	Pop 2020	% 2000	% 2010	% 2020
White alone (NH)	8	30	32	0.72%	2.18%	3.16%
Black or African American alone (NH)	0	0	3	0.00%	0.00%	0.30%
Native American or Alaska Native alone (NH)	0	4	0	0.00%	0.29%	0.00%
Asian alone (NH)	0	0	0	0.00%	0.00%	0.00%
Native Hawaiian or Pacific Islander alone (NH)	0	0	0	0.00%	0.00%	0.00%
Other race alone (NH)	0	0	5	0.00%	0.00%	0.49%
Mixed race or Multiracial (NH)	0	1	1	0.00%	0.07%	0.10%
Hispanic or Latino (any race)	1,110	1,341	973	99.28%	97.46%	95.96%
Total	1,118	1,376	1,014	100.00%	100.00%	100.00%

As of the 2020 United States census, there were 1,014 people, 252 households, and 252 families residing in South Point.

=== 2000 census ===
As of the census of 2000, there were 1,118 people, 257 households, and 242 families residing in South Point. The population density was 870.1 inhabitants per square mile (335.9/km^{2}). There were 291 housing units at an average density of 226.5 per square mile (87.5/km^{2}). The racial makeup of South Point was 0.72% White, 0% African American, 0% from other races, and 0.0156% from two or more races. Hispanic or Latino of any race were 99.28% of the population.

There were 257 households, out of which 60.7% had children under the age of 18 living with them, 77.0% were married couples living together, 12.5% had a female householder with no husband present, and 5.8% were non-families. 4.7% of all households were made up of individuals, and 0.4% had someone living alone who was 65 years of age or older. The average household size was 4.35 and the average family size was 4.50.

In South Point, the population was spread out, with 38.6% under the age of 18, 12.3% from 18 to 24, 28.1% from 25 to 44, 16.6% from 45 to 64, and 4.4% who were 65 years of age or older. The median age was 24 years. For every 100 females, there were 96.5 males. For every 100 females age 18 and over, there were 93.2 males.

The median income for a household in South Point was $21,688, and the median income for a family was $22,438. Males had a median income of $20,000 versus $11,375 for females. The per capita income for the CDP was $5,989. About 35.5% of families and 40.2% of the population were below the poverty line, including 51.6% of those under age 18 and 35.7% of those age 65 or over.

== Education ==
South Point is served by the Brownsville Independent School District.

In addition, South Texas Independent School District operates magnet schools that serve the community.
