= Lopez Early College High School =

Location
- 3205 South Dakota Avenue; Brownsville, (Cameron County), Texas 78521; United States; 25°52′57″N 97°25′21″W

Information
- Type: Public, Coeducational
- Motto: Lopez High School
- Established: 1993
- School district: Brownsville Independent School District (BISD)
- Superintendent: Dr. René Gutiérrez
- Principal: Aimee Garza
- Faculty: 125.42 (on FTE basis)
- Grades: 9-12
- Enrollment: 1,749 (2024-2025)
- Student to teacher ratio: 13.87
- Colors: Midnight blue and gold
- Fight song: Ohio State University's "Across The Field"
- Athletics: UIL Class AAAAA
- Mascot: Lobo
- Feeder schools: Senator Eddie A. Lucio Middle School & Raul Besterio Middle School
- Website: lopezechs.bisd.us

Lopez Early College High School serves as the magnet school of the fine arts as well as the agricultural academy at Brownsville Independent School District in Texas. Lopez High School opened in 1993. It is named after the Lopez family of Brownsville who own and operate independent supermarkets in South Texas. For the 2024-2025 school year, the school was given a "B" by the Texas Education Agency.

== Athletics ==
The Lopez Lobos compete in the following sports:

- Baseball
- Basketball
- Cross Country
- Football
- Golf
- Powerlifting
- Soccer
- Softball
- Swimming and Diving
- Tennis
- Track and Field
- Volleyball

=== State Titles ===
Brownsville Lopez was the first Valley team to ever win a soccer championship, doing so on April 10, 2004 with a 2-1 victory over Brenham.

- Boys Soccer
  - 2004(4A)
- Girls Diving

==== State Finalists ====
- Boys Soccer
  - 2009(5A)

2014 Boys and Girls District Champs
