= Gladys Porter Early College High School =

Gladys Porter High School

Location
- 3500 International Boulevard; Brownsville, Texas 78521; United States
- Coordinates: 25.9126°N 97.4719°W

Information
- School type: Public high school
- Founded: 1969
- School district: Brownsville Independent School District
- Principal: Dr. Rachel R. Ayala
- Teaching staff: 124.81 (FTE)
- Grades: 9-12
- Enrollment: 1,814 (2022-23)
- Student to teacher ratio: 14.53
- Colors: Blue & white
- Athletics conference: UIL Class AAAAA
- Mascot: Cowboy
- Website: porterechs.bisd.us

Gladys Porter Early College High School is a 5A public high school in Brownsville, Texas, United States, and is one of the successors of Brownsville High School. It is one of six high schools operated by the Brownsville Independent School District. For the 2024-2025 school year, the school was given a "B" by the Texas Education Agency.

== History ==
Porter High School was built to alleviate the over-crowded conditions which had existed at Brownsville High School for three years. Before the construction began, the school's colors and mascot were chosen at a board meeting on October 2, 1973. The school was named for Gladys Sams Porter (1910-March 16, 1980), the daughter of Earl C. Sams, who was the first president of the J.C. Penney retail chain and Lula A. Sams. Porter was a Brownsville civic leader and philanthropist.

The school is a magnet school for technology and engineering.

The first principal was Tony Ortiz.

The Magnet Program from Porter High School was moved to Veterans Memorial High School for the 2012-2013 school year.

== Athletics ==
The Porter Cowboys compete in the following sports:

- Baseball
- Basketball
- Cross country
- Football
- Golf
- Powerlifting
- Soccer
- Softball
- Swimming and diving
- Tennis
- Track and field
- Volleyball

=== Soccer ===
- Boys' soccer
  - 2006 (5A) State Champions
  - 2016 (5A) State Champions
