= San Pedro, Texas =

- Census-designated place
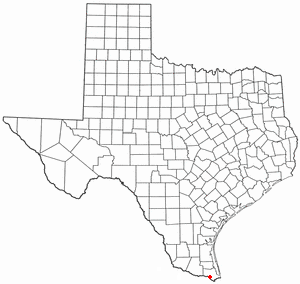
- Location of San Pedro, Texas

- Coordinates: 25°58′46″N 97°35′56″W
- Country: United States
- State: Texas
- County: Cameron

Area
  - Total: 1.2 sq mi (3.1 km^{2})
  - Land: 1.2 sq mi (3.1 km^{2})
  - Water: 0 sq mi (0.0 km^{2})
- Elevation: 46 ft (14 m)

Population (2020)
  - Total: 442
  - Density: 370/sq mi (140/km^{2})
- Time zone: UTC-6 (Central (CST))
  - Summer (DST): UTC-5 (CDT)
- FIPS code: 48-65620
- GNIS feature ID: 1375976

San Pedro is a census-designated place (CDP) in Cameron County, Texas, United States. The population was 442 at the 2020 census. It is part of the Brownsville–Harlingen Metropolitan Statistical Area.

== Geography ==
San Pedro is located in southern Cameron County at 25°58′46″N 97°35′56″W (25.979523, -97.598789), 8 miles (13 km) northwest of the center of Brownsville via U.S. Route 281. The community is less than one mile northeast of the Rio Grande, which forms the Mexico–United States border.

According to the United States Census Bureau, the CDP has a total area of 2.5 square miles (6.5 km^{2}), all land.

== Demographics ==
Historical population
Census	Pop.	Note	%±
2000	668		—
2010	530		−20.7%
2020	442		−16.6%
U.S. Decennial Census; 1850–1900 1910; 1920 1930 1940; 1950 1960 1970; 1980 1990 2000; 2010 2020

San Pedro first appeared as a census designated place in the 2000 U.S. census.

=== 2020 census ===
San Pedro CDP, Texas – Racial and ethnic composition Note: the US Census treats Hispanic/Latino as an ethnic category. This table excludes Latinos from the racial categories and assigns them to a separate category. Hispanics/Latinos may be of any race.
Race / Ethnicity (NH = Non-Hispanic)	Pop 2000	Pop 2010	Pop 2020	% 2000	% 2010	% 2020
White alone (NH)	23	7	17	3.44%	1.32%	3.85%
Black or African American alone (NH)	0	2	0	0.00%	0.38%	0.00%
Native American or Alaska Native alone (NH)	0	1	0	0.00%	0.19%	0.00%
Asian alone (NH)	0	0	0	0.00%	0.00%	0.00%
Native Hawaiian or Pacific Islander alone (NH)	0	0	0	0.00%	0.00%	0.00%
Other race alone (NH)	0	0	1	0.00%	0.00%	0.23%
Mixed race or Multiracial (NH)	0	0	0	0.00%	0.00%	0.00%
Hispanic or Latino (any race)	645	520	424	96.56%	98.11%	95.93%
Total	668	530	442	100.00%	100.00%	100.00%

As of the census of 2000, 668 people, 179 households, and 148 families were residing in the CDP. The population density was 269.9 inhabitants per square mile (104.2/km^{2}). The 191 housing units averaged 77.2/sq mi (29.7/km^{2}). The racial makeup of the CDP was 59.58% White, 0.15% African American, and 40.27% from other races. Hispanics or Latinos of any race were 96.56% of the population.

Of the 179 households, 41.3% had children under the age of 18 living with them, 66.5% were married couples living together, 10.6% had a female householder with no husband present, and 16.8% were not families. About 12.8% of all households were made up of individuals, and 7.8% had someone living alone who was 65 years of age or older. The average household size was 3.73, and the average family size was 4.09.

In the CDP, the age distribution was 33.2% under 18, 7.9% from 18 to 24, 28.1% from 25 to 44, 21.6% from 45 to 64, and 9.1% who were 65 or older. The median age was 30 years. For every 100 females, there were 93.1 males. For every 100 females age 18 and over, there were 82.8 males.

The median income for a household in the CDP was $29,531, and for a family was $35,192. Males had a median income of $16,711 versus $12,188 for females. The per capita income for the CDP was $7,287. About 27.3% of families and 27.9% of the population were below the poverty line, including 25.6% of those under age 18 and 29.0% of those age 65 or over.

== Education ==
San Pedro is served by the Brownsville Independent School District.

In addition, South Texas Independent School District operates magnet schools that serve the community.
