= Homer Hanna Early College High School =

Public school in Texas, United States

Homer Hanna High School

Location
- 2615 Price Road; Brownsville, Texas 78521; United States; 25.9367°N 97.4805°W

Information
- School type: Public high school
- Founded: 1967
- School district: Brownsville Independent School District
- Principal: Dr. Linda Gallegos
- Staff: 136.85 (FTE)
- Grades: 9-12
- Enrollment: 2,039 (2024-25)
- Student to teacher ratio: 14.90
- Colors: Brown and gold
- Athletics conference: UIL Class AAAAA
- Mascot: Golden Eagle
- Website: hannaechs.bisd.us

Hanna High School is a 5A public high school in Brownsville, Texas, United States. It is one of six high schools operated by the Brownsville Independent School District. For the 2024-2025 school year, the school was given an overall rating of "B" from the Texas Education Agency.

Originally named Brownsville High School starting with its inception in 1915, it was rechristened in 1974 to honor veteran South Texas teacher and administrator Homer Lee Hanna, who died in 2004.

== Notable alumni ==
- Al Ward (1946), New York Jets general manager from 1975 to 1977.
- Gina Hinojosa (1992), Governor-elect of Texas and assuming office on January 19, 2027.
