= Brownsville Early College High School =

Public school in Texas, United States

Location
- 343 Ringgold Rd; Brownsville, Texas 78520; United States; 25.893755°N 97.493738°W

Information
- Type: Public high school
- Established: August 2008
- School district: Brownsville Independent School District
- Principal: Blanca Lambarri
- Faculty: 15.40 (FTE)
- Grades: 9-12
- Enrollment: 311 (2024-25)
- Student to teacher ratio: 20.19
- Colors: Orange and blue
- Team name: Scorpions
- Website: bechs.bisd.us

Brownsville Early College High School (BECHS) is a public high school in Brownsville, Texas, United States. It is one of seven high schools operated by the Brownsville Independent School District and classified as a 3A school by the UIL. For the 2024-2025 school year, the school was given an "A" by the Texas Education Agency. In 2018, it was ranked the 59th best high school in Texas and 359th in the National Rankings according to the U.S. News & World Report.

Brownsville Early College High School does not have school team sports; however, it does offer physical education (PE).

== Student organizations ==
=== Community service clubs ===
Clubs involved in performing community service include National Honor Society, Spanish National Honor Society, Spanish Club, AVID Club, and Interact Club.

=== Career interest clubs ===
Clubs that are career oriented include Technology Student Association (TSA), Business Professionals of America (BPA), Mock Trial, and Math Club.

The Technology Student Association (TSA) is an international student organization dedicated to developing skills in the STEM fields of science, technology, engineering and math. BECHS teams have advanced to the National level on multiple occasions. One team won 1st place in the video game design competition at the 2017 TSA National Conference, and another team placed 8th at the 2018 National Conference, also competing in video game design.

=== Interpersonal dynamics clubs ===
Clubs based around culture and social dynamics include the Dancing Stars, Student Council, BECHS Music, Chess Club, Drama Club, Destination Imagination, Fine Arts, Bible Study (Transformers), Environmental Club, Resaca Rangers, Video Game Design Club, Film Club, Anime Club, Choir, and Asian Culture Club.
