= Reid Hope King, Texas =

- Census-designated place
- Coordinates: 25°55′11″N 97°24′44″W
- Country: United States
- State: Texas
- County: Cameron

Area
  - Total: 0.30 sq mi (0.77 km^{2})
  - Land: 0.28 sq mi (0.73 km^{2})
  - Water: 0.015 sq mi (0.04 km^{2})
- Elevation: 16 ft (5 m)

Population (2020)
  - Total: 667
  - Density: 2,400/sq mi (910/km^{2})
- Time zone: UTC-6 (Central (CST))
  - Summer (DST): UTC-5 (CDT)
- FIPS code: 48-61466
- GNIS feature ID: 1852760

Reid Hope King is a census-designated place (CDP) in Cameron County, Texas, United States. The population was 667 at the 2020 census. It is part of the Brownsville–Harlingen Metropolitan Statistical Area.

== Geography ==
Reid Hope King is located in southern Cameron County at 25°55′11″N 97°24′44″W (25.919803, -97.412307). Texas State Highway 4 forms the southern edge of the CDP; the highway leads west 6 miles (10 km) to the center of Brownsville and east 18 miles (29 km) to its end at Boca Chica Beach on the Gulf of Mexico.

According to the United States Census Bureau, the Reid Hope King CDP has a total area of 0.30 square miles (0.77 km^{2}), of which 0.28 square miles (0.73 km^{2}) is land and 0.02 square miles (0.04 km^{2}), or 4.87%, is water.

== Demographics ==
Historical population
Census	Pop.	Note	%±
2000	802		—
2010	786		−2.0%
2020	667		−15.1%
U.S. Decennial Census; 1850–1900 1910; 1920 1930 1940; 1950 1960 1970; 1980 1990 2000; 2010 2020

Reid Hope King first appeared as a census designated place in the 2000 U.S. census.

=== 2020 census ===
Reid Hope King CDP, Texas – Racial and ethnic composition Note: the US Census treats Hispanic/Latino as an ethnic category. This table excludes Latinos from the racial categories and assigns them to a separate category. Hispanics/Latinos may be of any race.
Race / Ethnicity (NH = Non-Hispanic)	Pop 2000	Pop 2010	Pop 2020	% 2000	% 2010	% 2020
White alone (NH)	29	15	21	3.62%	1.91%	3.15%
Black or African American alone (NH)	0	3	1	0.00%	0.38%	0.15%
Native American or Alaska Native alone (NH)	1	0	0	0.12%	0.00%	0.00%
Asian alone (NH)	0	0	0	0.00%	0.00%	0.00%
Native Hawaiian or Pacific Islander alone (NH)	0	0	0	0.00%	0.00%	0.00%
Other race alone (NH)	0	0	3	0.00%	0.00%	0.45%
Mixed race or Multiracial (NH)	8	0	2	1.00%	0.00%	0.30%
Hispanic or Latino (any race)	764	768	640	95.26%	97.71%	95.95%
Total	802	786	667	100.00%	100.00%	100.00%

As of the census of 2000, there were 802 people, 194 households, and 174 families residing in the CDP. The population density was 2,710.8 inhabitants per square mile (1,046.6/km^{2}). There were 212 housing units at an average density of 716.6 per square mile (276.7/km^{2}). The racial makeup of the CDP was 77.31% White, 1.75% African American, 0.25% Native American, 16.71% from other races, and 3.99% from two or more races. Hispanic or Latino of any race were 95.26% of the population.

There were 194 households, out of which 56.2% had children under the age of 18 living with them, 62.4% were married couples living together, 22.7% had a female householder with no husband present, and 10.3% were non-families. 8.2% of all households were made up of individuals, and 3.1% had someone living alone who was 65 years of age or older. The average household size was 4.13 and the average family size was 4.38.

In the CDP, the population was spread out, with 38.3% under the age of 18, 13.2% from 18 to 24, 23.6% from 25 to 44, 18.3% from 45 to 64, and 6.6% who were 65 years of age or older. The median age was 24 years. For every 100 females, there were 93.7 males. For every 100 females age 18 and over, there were 88.2 males.

The median income for a household in the CDP was $19,732, and the median income for a family was $25,865. Males had a median income of $13,657 versus $12,143 for females. The per capita income for the CDP was $8,845. About 38.8% of families and 41.2% of the population were below the poverty line, including 45.3% of those under age 18 and 54.3% of those age 65 or over.

== Education ==
Reid Hope King is served by the Brownsville Independent School District.

In addition, South Texas Independent School District operates magnet schools that serve the community.
