= Al Ward =

American football player and executive (1927–2021)

Personal information
- Born: October 24, 1927; Brownsville, Texas, U.S.
- Died: January 3, 2021 (aged 93)

Career history
- New York Jets (1975–1977) General manager
- Executive profile at Pro Football Reference

Albert Timothy Ward (October 24, 1927 – January 3, 2021) was an American professional football executive who served as the general manager of the New York Jets from 1975 to 1977.

Ward was a four-year football letterman at Brownsville High School in his hometown, graduating in 1946. He joined the United States Army Corps of Engineers later that same year. He eventually matriculated at the University of Texas at Austin where he was a sportswriter with The Daily Texan.

Before becoming the Jets general manager, he had been the vice president of administration to Dallas Cowboys General Manager Tex Schramm. Ward began his pro football career as director of public relations for the American Football League when it was based in Dallas, Texas, from 1960 through 1962. When the league moved its offices to New York, Ward became director of public relations for the Southwest Conference and the Cotton Bowl until rejoining the AFL in 1965 as director of promotions. He joined the Cowboys after the 1965 season as director of public relations and became assistant general manager to Schramm in 1966. He was named vice-president in 1972.

After seeing Jets secretary Connie Carberg's abilities to judge players on their skills, in 1976, Ward gave her a full-time position in the scouting department and she became the NFL's first female scout in history.
