= Cameron Park, Texas =

- CDP
- Coordinates: 25°58′15″N 97°28′43″W
- Country: United States
- State: Texas
- County: Cameron

Area
  - Total: 0.62 sq mi (1.6 km^{2})
  - Land: 0.58 sq mi (1.5 km^{2})
  - Water: 0 sq mi (0.0 km^{2})
- Elevation: 16 ft (5 m)

Population (2020)
  - Total: 6,099
  - Density: 11,000/sq mi (4,100/km^{2})
- Time zone: UTC-6 (Central (CST))
  - Summer (DST): UTC-5 (CDT)
- ZIP code: 78526
- Area code: 956
- FIPS code: 48-12045
- GNIS feature ID: 1867543

Cameron Park is a census-designated place (CDP) in Cameron County, Texas, United States. The population was 6,099 at the 2020 census. It is part of the Brownsville–Harlingen Metropolitan Statistical Area.

== Geography ==
Cameron Park is located at 25°58′15″N 97°28′43″W (25.970707, -97.478659).

According to the United States Census Bureau, the CDP has a total area of 0.6 square miles (1.6 km^{2}), of which 0.6 square miles (1.6 km^{2}) is land and 1.64% is water.

== Demographics ==
Historical population
Census	Pop.	Note	%±
1990	3,802		—
2000	5,961		56.8%
2010	6,963		16.8%
2020	6,099		−12.4%
U.S. Decennial Census; 1850–1900 1910; 1920 1930 1940; 1950 1960 1970; 1980 1990 2000; 2010

Cameron Park first appeared as a census designated place in the 1990 U.S. census.

=== 2020 census ===
Cameron Park CDP, Texas – Racial and ethnic composition Note: the US Census treats Hispanic/Latino as an ethnic category. This table excludes Latinos from the racial categories and assigns them to a separate category. Hispanics/Latinos may be of any race.
Race / Ethnicity (NH = Non-Hispanic)	Pop 2000	Pop 2010	Pop 2020	% 2000	% 2010	% 2020
White alone (NH)	42	43	73	0.70%	0.62%	1.20%
Black or African American alone (NH)	0	0	3	0.00%	0.00%	0.05%
Native American or Alaska Native alone (NH)	0	4	3	0.00%	0.06%	0.05%
Asian alone (NH)	1	1	5	0.02%	0.01%	0.08%
Native Hawaiian or Pacific Islander alone (NH)	0	0	0	0.00%	0.00%	0.00%
Other race alone (NH)	0	2	4	0.00%	0.03%	0.07%
Mixed race or Multiracial (NH)	0	0	2	0.00%	0.00%	0.03%
Hispanic or Latino (any race)	5,918	6,913	6,009	99.28%	99.28%	98.52%
Total	5,961	6,963	6,099	100.00%	100.00%	100.00%

As of the 2020 United States census, there were 6,099 people, 1,381 households, and 1,239 families residing in the CDP.

=== 2010 census ===
As of the census of 2010, there were 6,963 people, 1,269 households, and 1,199 families residing in the CDP. The population density was 9,962.4 inhabitants per square mile (3,846.5/km^{2}). There were 1,366 housing units at an average density of 2,282.9 per square mile (881.4/km^{2}). The racial makeup of the CDP was 87.05% White, 0.08% African American, 0.12% Asian, 11.93% from other races, and 0.82% from two or more races. Hispanic or Latino of any race were 99.28% of the population.

There were 1,269 households, out of which 69.0% had children under the age of 18 living with them, 71.8% were married couples living together, 16.7% had a female householder with no husband present, and 5.5% were non-families. 4.3% of all households were made up of individuals, and 1.9% had someone living alone who was 65 years of age or older. The average household size was 4.70 and the average family size was 4.81.

In the CDP, the population was spread out, with 43.4% under the age of 18, 13.8% from 18 to 24, 26.0% from 25 to 44, 13.0% from 45 to 64, and 3.7% who were 65 years of age or older. The median age was 21 years. For every 100 females, there were 101.8 males. For every 100 females age 18 and over, there were 93.7 males.

The median income for a household in the CDP was $16,934, and the median income for a family was $17,033. Males had a median income of $13,784 versus $12,805 for females. The per capita income for the CDP was $4,103. About 58.1% of families and 61.2% of the population were below the poverty line, including 66.4% of those under age 18 and 41.9% of those age 65 or over.

Cameron Park is one of the communities with the lowest income in the United States.

== Education ==
Cameron Park is served by the Brownsville Independent School District.

In addition, South Texas Independent School District operates magnet schools that serve the community.

== Discussion ==
Cameron Park was the subject of a This I Believe segment
