= Simon Rivera Early College High School =

Public school in Texas, United States

Location
- 6955 FM 802; Brownsville, Texas 78521; United States; 25.93979°N 97.41615°W

Information
- School type: Public high school
- Motto: Once a Raider always a Raider
- Established: 1988
- School district: Brownsville Independent School District
- Principal: Obed Leal
- Teaching staff: 141.40 (FTE)
- Grades: 9-12
- Enrollment: 2,185 (2023-2024)
- Student to teacher ratio: 15.45
- Colors: Red & Black
- Athletics conference: UIL Class AAAAA
- Mascot: Raider
- Website: riveraechs.bisd.us

Simon Rivera High School is a public high school in Brownsville, Texas (USA). It is one of six high schools operated by the Brownsville Independent School District and classified as a 5A school by the UIL. For the 2024-2025 school year, the school was given a "B" by the Texas Education Agency.

It opened in 1988 and consisted of two grade levels, ninth and tenth grade. Each year another grade level was added. Its first graduating class was in 1991. The school was named for Simon Rivera Jr., a long-time principal at Brownsville's Central Intermediate School.

== Athletics ==
The Rivera Raiders compete in the following sports:

- Baseball
- Basketball
- Cross Country
- Football
- Golf
- Powerlifting
- Soccer
- Softball
- Swimming and Divingcit
- Tennis
- Track and Field
- Volleyball

=== Soccer ===
2015 6A Soccer State Champions

== Clubs and Associations ==
- National Honor Society
- Student Council
- Health Occupations Students of America
- Technology Student Association
- Business Professionals of America
- Drama
- Chess
- Leadership Club
- Yearbook Club
- Butterfly Garden Club
- UIL Math
- UIL One Act Play
- UIL Journalism
- UIL Speech
- Destination Imagination

== Electives ==
The Rivera Raiders have the following electives

- Art
- Band
- Colorguard
- Choir
- Dance
- Estudiantina
- Mariachi
- JROTC
