= Brownsville Independent School District =

School district in Texas, United States

Address
- 1900 Price Rd Brownsville, Texas, 78521-2417; United States

District information
- Type: Public
- Grades: PK–12
- Established: 1915
- Superintendent: Jesus H. Chavez
- Governing agency: Texas Education Agency
- Schools: 56
- NCES District ID: 4811680

Students and staff
- Enrollment: 37,898 (2022–2023)
- Teachers: 2,575.88 (on an FTE basis)
- Student–teacher ratio: 14.71

Other information
- Website: www.bisd.us

Brownsville Independent School District is a school district based in Brownsville, Texas, United States.

BISD serves most of the city of Brownsville and a portion of the town of Rancho Viejo as well as unincorporated areas in Cameron County, including Cameron Park, Reid Hope King, San Pedro, South Point, and Villa Pancho. It is the largest school district in the Rio Grande Valley metropolitan area.

BISD won the 2008 Broad Prize for Urban Education, the largest school district award in the country, based on improving student performance, closing achievement gaps, and strong district-wide policies.

In 2009, the school district was rated "academically acceptable" by the Texas Education Agency.

== Schools ==
=== High schools ===
- Homer Hanna High School Est.1965 UIL Class 6A
- Gladys Porter High School Est.1969 UIL Class 5A
- James Pace High School Est.1975 UIL Class 5A
- Simon Rivera High School Est.1988 UIL Class 5A
- Lopez High School Est.1993 UIL Class 5A
- Brownsville Early College High School Est.2008
- Veterans Memorial High School Est.2010 UIL Class 6A

=== Middle schools ===
- Stell Middle School- Est. 1957
- Perkins Middle School- Est. 1987
- Lucio Middle School- Est. 1997
- Besteiro Middle School- Est. 1994
- Garcia Middle School- Est. 2002
- Vela Middle School- Est. 1990
- Faulk Middle School- Est. 1957
- Stillman Middle School- Est. 2004
- Oliveira Middle School- Est.1979
- Manzano Middle School- Est. 2010

=== Elementary schools ===
- Ortiz Elementary School
- Paredes Elementary School
- Gallegos Elementary School
- Yturria Elementary School
- Hudson Elementary School
- Martin Elementary School
- Breeden Elementary School
- Pena Elementary School
- Benavides Elementary School
- Brite Elementary School
- Burns Elementary School
- Garden Park Elementary School
- Champion Elementary School
- Skinner Elementary School
- Cromack-Castaneda Elementary School
- Villa Nueva Elementary School
- Pullam Elementary School
- Aiken Elementary School
- El Jardin Elementary School
- Russell Elementary School
- Gonzalez Elementary School
- Vermillion Road Elementary School
- Sharp Elementary School
- Keller Elementary School
- Canales Elementary School
- Del Castillo-Morningside Elementary School
- Egly Elementary School
- Palm Grove Elementary School
- Perez Elementary School
- Putegnat Elementary School
- Judge Reynaldo G. Garza at Southmost Elementary School

=== Alternative schools ===
- Brownsville Academic Center
- Brownsville Learning Academy
- Lincoln Park School
- Regional School for the Deaf
