= James Pace Early College High School =

James Pace High School

Location
- 314 West Los Ebanos Boulevard; Brownsville, (Cameron County), Texas 78520; United States; 25°52′57″N 97°25′21″W

Information
- Type: Public, coeducational
- Established: 1975
- School district: Brownsville Independent School District
- Principal: Marisol A. Trevino
- Faculty: 104.78 (on FTE basis)
- Grades: 9-12
- Enrollment: 1,621 (2024-2025)
- Student to teacher ratio: 15.47
- Colors: Green, white and black
- Athletics: UIL Class AAAAA
- Mascot: Viking
- Newspaper: KWLF Productions
- Website: paceechs.bisd.us

James Pace Early College High School is a 5A public high school in Brownsville, Texas, United States. It is home to the Criminal Justice and Law Enforcement magnet program for the Brownsville Independent School District. For the 2024-2025 school year, the school was given a "B" by the Texas Education Agency.

== Athletics ==
The Pace Vikings compete in the following sports:

- Baseball
- Basketball
- Cross country
- Football
- Golf
- Powerlifting
- Soccer
- Softball
- Swimming and diving
- Tennis
- Track and field
- Volleyball

=== State titles ===
- Boys' cross country
  - 2004 (4A)
