= Edythe Broad =

American art collector and philanthropist

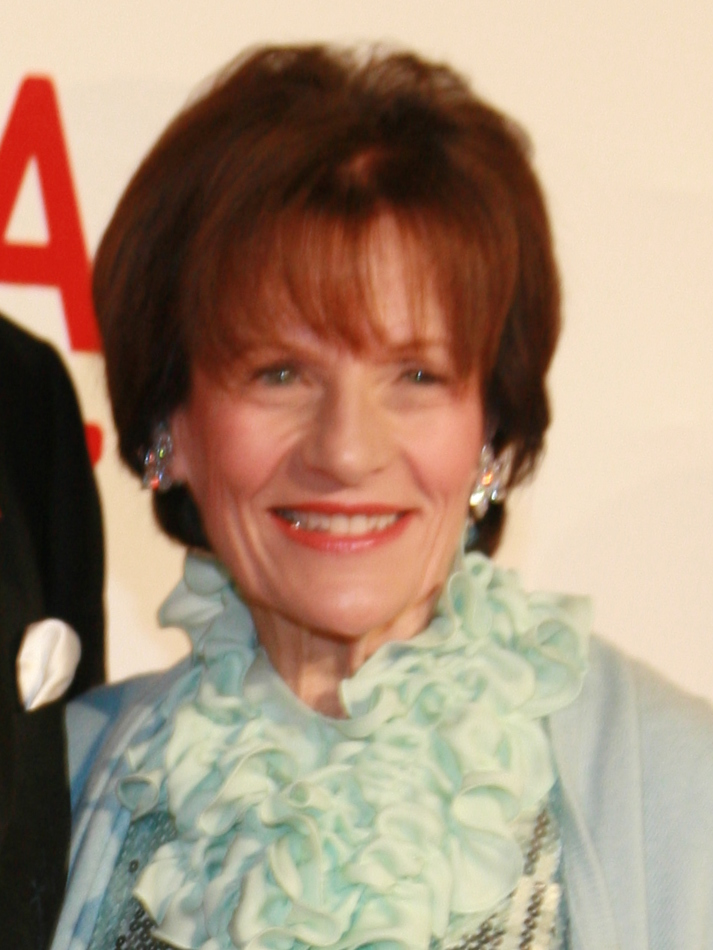
- Broad in 2008
- Born: Edythe Lawson; 1936 (age 89–90); Detroit, Michigan, U.S.
- Monuments: The Broad
- Occupations: Philanthropist, art collector, founder of The Broad Foundations
- Known for: Arts patron
- Spouse: Eli Broad
- Children: 2

Edythe Broad (/broʊd/; born Edythe Lawson in 1936) is an American art collector and philanthropist. As an individual and with her husband Eli Broad (1933–2021), she has collected "about 2000 pieces of art valued at more than $2 billion" and supported arts initiatives such as the Los Angeles Opera and The Broad.

== Early life ==
Born in Detroit to a homemaker and chemist, Edythe Lawson attended public school and particularly enjoyed school trips to the Detroit Institute of Arts. Early artworks of importance to her include John Singleton Copley's Watson and the Shark, and Picasso's Three Musicians.

When Lawson was a teenager, she met Eli Broad, who proposed to her after a few dates. They married in 1954. Her father gave her husband and her cousin the money to start his first company, and the couple became significantly wealthy through this and subsequent businesses. They had two sons, Jeffrey and Gary.

== Philanthropy and arts patronage ==
=== Collecting ===
In 1963, Broad and her family moved to Los Angeles. Broad took walks in the evenings through the galleries on La Cienega Boulevard and began acquiring works by Southern California artists.

She met Taft Schreiber and through him encountered art dealers in New York. In 1972, Broad and her husband purchased a Van Gogh drawing entitled Cabanes a Saintes-Maries, 1888, for $95,000. Broad's husband Eli became increasingly involved in collecting and they increasingly concentrated their focus on postwar and contemporary art. They traded the Van Gogh in a deal to acquire a work by Robert Rauschenberg.

Broad was friends with various contemporary artists in the 1970s. Lichtenstein gifted her his Brushstroke Chair and Ottoman sculptures after she admired them in his studio, and Broad and Dorothy Lichtenstein did yoga together.

Today, Broad particularly appreciates the works of Jeff Koons. Several of his works are exhibited at The Broad.

Broad and her husband financially supported various collections and art museums. In 2008, The Broad Foundation gave $30 million to the Museum of Contemporary Art, Los Angeles, on the condition that it not merge with the Los Angeles County Museum of Art. Broad and her husband separately supported that organisation, for which they endowed a $56 million building in 2003.

Broad also has a collection of pre-Columbian gold jewellery.

==== The Broad ====
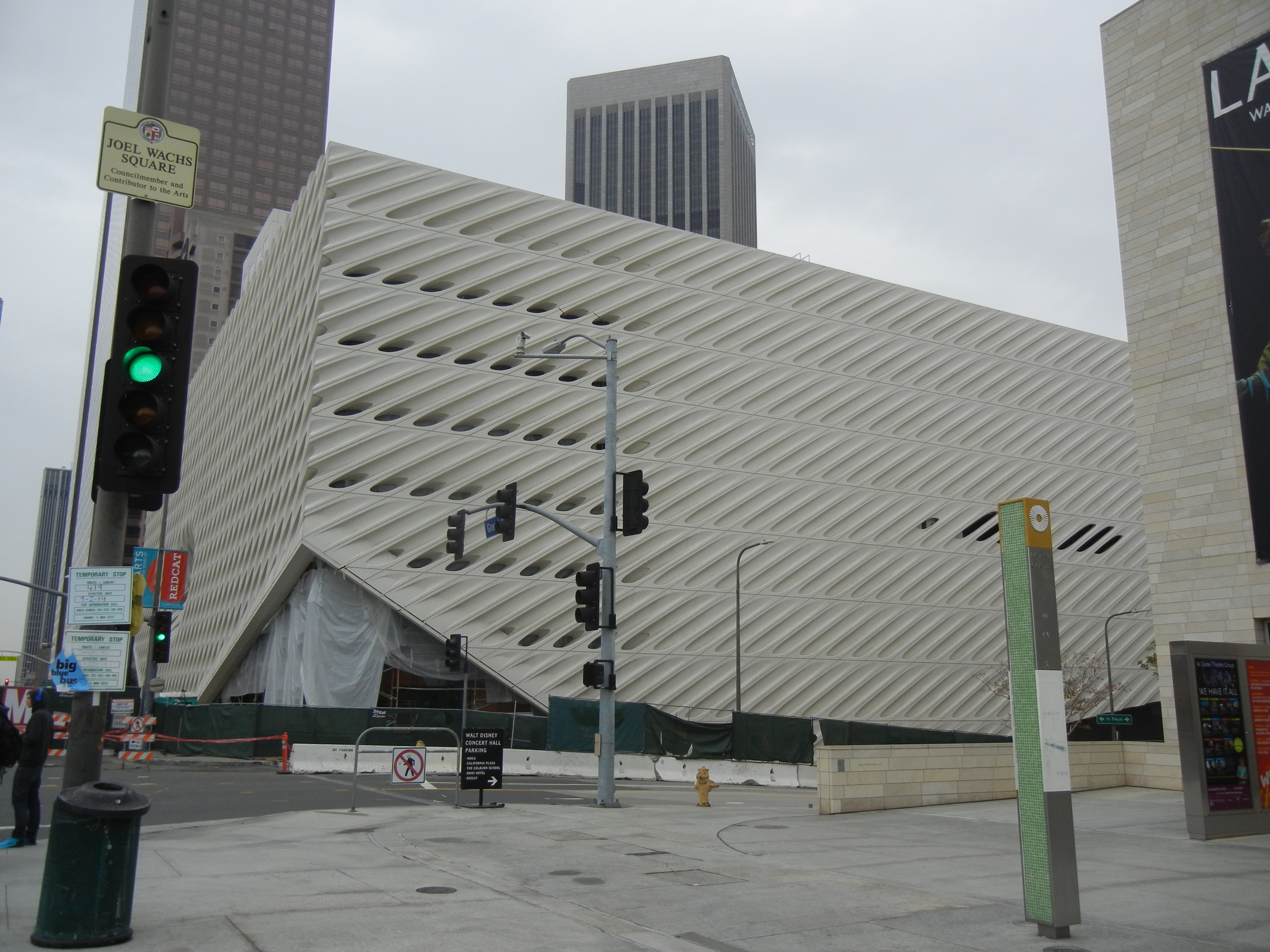
The Broad museum under construction, 2015

Broad was involved in selecting Elizabeth Diller to be the architect for The Broad, the art museum that opened in 2015, via an architectural competition.

In February 2015, a public preview of a special installation attracted some 3,500 visitors while the museum was still under construction. The museum was opened by Broad and her husband on September 20, 2015.

She is featured on the audio guide for the museum.

=== Music ===
Broad is a notable patron of classical music and opera, and is close friends with Plácido Domingo. The creation of the music venues the Broad Stage (the performing arts centre at Santa Monica College) and the Edye (an adjacent black box performance space) are credited to her. The Broads donated $6 million to the Los Angeles Opera to bring Richard Wagner's opera cycle Der Ring des Nibelungen to Los Angeles for the 2009–10 season. In June 2013, the Broads gave $7 million to continue funding the Eli and Edythe Broad general director at LA Opera.

=== Philanthropy ===
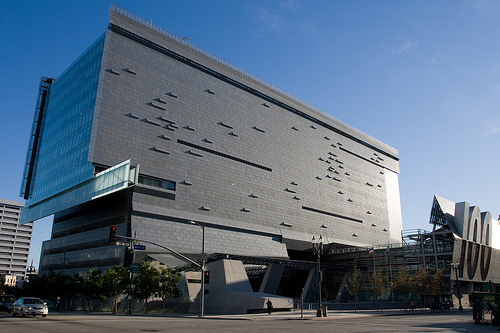
The Eli and Edythe Broad Plaza in front of the Caltrans District 7 Headquarters

Edythe and Eli Broad created The Broad Foundations, which include The Eli and Edythe Broad Foundation and The Broad Art Foundation. These organizations have assets of $2.5 billion.

The Broads signed on to The Giving Pledge, a commitment for wealthy individuals to give at least half of their wealth to charity, in 2010 when they founded the museum. They committed to giving 75% of their wealth away.

Broad and her husband supported educational causes via The Eli and Edythe Broad Foundation, whose stated mission is to expand learning opportunities to students from underserved communities so they can reach their full potential.

The Broads also donated a significant sum to higher education organisations, including Michigan State University (MSU), where Eli studied. They donated $28 million for the construction of the Eli and Edythe Broad Art Museum, designed by Pritzker Architecture Prize-winning architect Zaha Hadid. The museum opened in November 2012. In 2014, The Broad Foundation announced a further $5 million gift to the Broad Art Museum at MSU to support exhibitions.

Broad and her husband also contributed significant amounts towards scientific and medical research via the Broad Foundation. In 2003, they gave a $100 million founding gift to create the Broad Institute of MIT and Harvard, which was to focus on genomics research. They subsequently gave $100 million in 2004, and then $400 million in 2009 in order to make the institute an independent nonprofit. In 2013, the Broads gave another $100 million to the organisation. A public-private partnership between the voter-created California Institute of Regenerative Medicine, the Keck School of Medicine of USC and The Eli and Edythe Broad Foundation (which donated $30 million in 2006) resulted in the creation of The Eli and Edythe Broad Center for Regenerative Medicine and Stem Cell Research at the University of Southern California (USC). In 2007, the Broads contributed $20 million to the Eli and Edythe Broad Center of Regenerative Medicine and Stem Cell Research at the University of California, Los Angeles (UCLA). Then, in 2008, they gave a major gift to the University of California, San Francisco for the new headquarters of the Eli and Edythe Broad Center of Regeneration Medicine and Stem Cell Research, which opened in February 2011.

== Awards and honours ==
In October 2013, the Broads were awarded the William E. Simon Prize for Philanthropic Leadership by Philanthropy Roundtable.

In 2018, Broad and her husband were named Distinguished Philanthropists at the John F. Kennedy Center for the Performing Arts in Washington, D.C. In the same year, they received the American Federation of the Arts Cultural Leadership award.

In 2019, Broad and her husband received honorary degrees from the University of Southern California.
