= Eli Broad =

American businessperson and philanthropist (1933–2021)

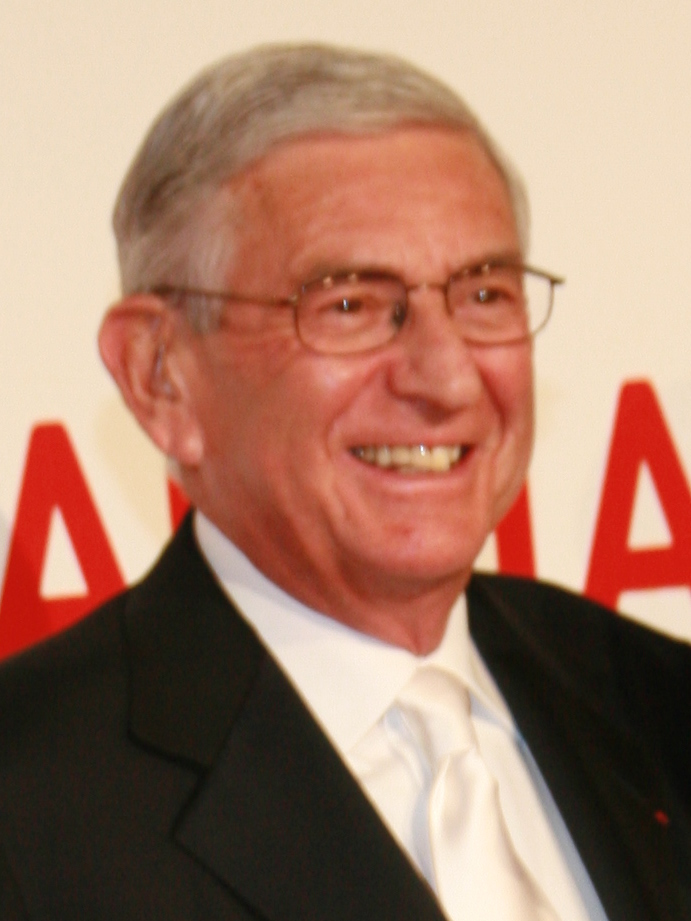
- Broad in 2008
- Born: June 6, 1933; New York City, U.S.
- Died: April 30, 2021 (aged 87); Los Angeles, California, U.S.
- Monuments: The Broad
- Education: Michigan State University
- Occupations: Businessman; philanthropist
- Political party: Democratic
- Spouse: Edythe Lawson (m. 1954)
- Children: 2

Eli Broad (/broʊd/ BROHD; June 6, 1933 – April 30, 2021) was an American businessman and philanthropist. In June 2019, Forbes ranked him as the 233rd-wealthiest person in the world and the 78th-wealthiest in the United States, with an estimated net worth of $6.7 billion. He was known for his philanthropic commitment to transforming public K–12 education to a charter school model, scientific and medical research, and the visual and performing arts.

== Early life ==
Broad was born on June 6, 1933, in the Bronx, New York City, the son of Rebecca (Jacobson) and Leo Broad, Lithuanian Jewish immigrants who met in New York. His father worked as a house painter, and his mother as a dressmaker. His family moved to Detroit, Michigan, when he was six years old. In Detroit, his father was a union organizer and owned five-and-dime stores. Broad attended Detroit Public Schools and graduated from Detroit Central High School in 1951.

Broad attended Michigan State University, majoring in accounting with a minor in economics and graduating cum laude in 1954. Among the jobs Broad held in college were selling women's shoes, selling garbage disposals door-to-door, and working as a drill press operator at Packard Motor, where he was a member of United Auto Workers. The same year, 21-year-old Broad married 18-year-old Edythe "Edye" Lawson.

Broad became the youngest Michigan resident to attain the credentials of Certified Public Accountant (CPA), a record he held until 2010. Broad worked as an accountant for two years and taught night classes at the Detroit Institute of Technology as an assistant professor of accounting in 1956. Wanting to work on his own, he founded his own accounting firm and was offered office space by the husband of his wife's cousin, Donald Bruce Kaufman, in return for doing the books for Kaufman's small homebuilding and subcontracting business.

== Career ==
=== Kaufman & Broad ===
Doing the accounting for Kaufman's small business led Broad to decide to enter homebuilding himself. In 1956, Broad and Kaufman decided to partner and build homes together. Borrowing $12,500 from his wife's parents, Broad put up half the capital in their first venture together, building two model homes in the Northeast Detroit suburbs where a new generation of first-time home buyers were flocking. By streamlining the construction process and eliminating basements, offering a carport instead, they could price the houses so the monthly mortgage would be less than the rent for a two-bedroom apartment. Kaufman and Broad named this model the "Award Winner" and priced it at $13,700. After one weekend, seventeen were sold, and within two years Kaufman and Broad had built 600 homes in the Detroit suburbs. In 1960, fearing that the Detroit economy was too dependent on the automotive business, they moved to Phoenix, Arizona. In 1961 Kaufman and Broad Home Corporation (now KB Home) went public on the American Stock Exchange. In 1963 Broad moved the company to Los Angeles. Soon after, Kaufman retired, and he and his wife Glorya Kaufman went on to become noted philanthropists. By 1969 KB Home was the first homebuilder listed on the New York Stock Exchange. In 1974, Broad stepped down as CEO.

=== SunAmerica ===
In 1971 Broad acquired Sun Life Insurance Company of America, a family-owned insurance company founded in Baltimore in 1890, for $52 million. Broad transformed Sun Life into the retirement savings powerhouse SunAmerica. SunAmerica went public in 1989, with a remaining share of 42% for Broad. In 1998 he sold SunAmerica to the American International Group (AIG) for $17.8 billion after three weeks of secret negotiations. Broad continued as CEO of SunAmerica until 2000, when he left to focus on philanthropy full time.

=== Writing ===
In 2012, Broad's book, The Art of Being Unreasonable: Lessons in Unconventional Thinking, was published by Wiley and Sons and debuted as a New York Times, Wall Street Journal, USA Today, and Washington Post bestseller.

In June 2019, The New York Times published an op-ed authored by Broad advocating for a wealth tax.

== Philanthropy and civic engagement ==
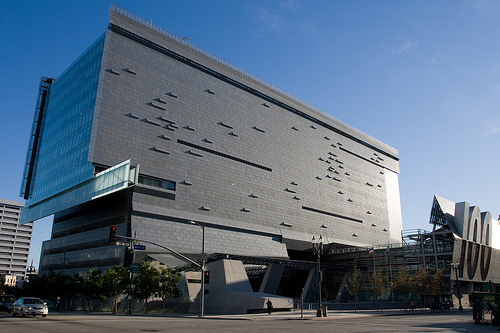
The Eli and Edythe Broad Plaza in front of the Caltrans District 7 Headquarters

Eli and Edythe Broad created the Broad Foundations, which include the Eli and Edythe Broad Foundation and the Broad Art Foundation. These organizations have assets of $2.5 billion.

In 2010, Eli and Edythe Broad signed the Giving Pledge, formalizing their intention to give away 75 percent of their wealth during or after their lifetimes. The Broads personally committed to giving 75% of their wealth away. As of October 2017, the Broads had given more than $4 billion to support K-12 public schools, advance scientific and medical research, and bring contemporary art to as wide an audience as possible.

In 2017, Broad announced his retirement from the Eli and Edythe Broad Foundation, passing responsibility to its president, Gerun Riley. Broad said he would remain as a trustee of the foundation, and continue to serve on the board of the Broad Museum. Broad said he was in good health and felt like it was time to "step back".

In 2020, Forbes awarded Broad a perfect philanthropy score of 5, the highest possible rating; placing him among an exclusive group of just ten Forbes 400 members, alongside Warren Buffett, George Soros, John Arnold, and others who have each given away at least 20% of their fortune.

=== Education ===
The stated mission of the Eli and Edythe Broad Foundation's education work is to expand learning opportunities to students from underserved communities so they can reach their full potential. The foundation has made $650 million in grants since it launched in 1999. In 2001, Broad founded the Broad Center, a nonprofit focused on developing school system leaders.

==== The Broad Prize ====
From 2002 to 2014, the Broad Foundation awarded an annual $1 million Broad Prize for Urban Education. The Broad Prize recognized the large urban school districts in America that have made the greatest improvement in student achievement while narrowing achievement gaps among low-income students and students of color. In 2012, the foundation launched the Broad Prize for Public Charter Schools, which awarded $250,000 to the top charter management organization in the country. Over the course of 17 years, prize money totaling nearly $18 million went to support college scholarships and college readiness programs. Both prizes were officially sunsetted in 2019.

==== The Broad Center ====
The Broad Center supports leaders who are inspired to work towards transforming public education into an engine of excellence and equity. The nonprofit includes two highly selective professional development programs, the Broad Academy and the Broad Residency in Urban Education. The Broad Academy supports current and aspiring superintendents of urban public school districts, public charter school networks, and state departments of education as they work to grow their organizations' effectiveness and increase their impact. The Broad Residency in Urban Education is a two-year program that matches early- to mid-career professionals with management roles in urban public school systems while earning an accredited masters in education.

==== Charter schools ====
In 2015, the Los Angeles Times obtained a secret 44-page proposal drafted by the Eli and Edythe Broad Foundation and other charter advocates that was designed to charterize 50% of Los Angeles public schools. The result was the creation of Great Public Schools Now, a nonprofit organization.

=== Arts ===
Broad was the founding chairman of the Museum of Contemporary Art, Los Angeles in 1979 and chaired the board until 1984. He recruited the founding director of the museum and negotiated the acquisition of the Panza Collection for the museum.

He served on the Chairman's Council for many years at both the Metropolitan Museum of Art and the Museum of Modern Art in New York City.

In 2008, the Broad Foundation donated $30 million to the Museum of Contemporary Art. The foundation's donation was contingent on the museum remaining independent and not merging with Los Angeles County Museum of Art.

Broad was a life trustee of the Los Angeles County Museum of Art (LACMA). In 2003, the Broad Foundation gave $60 million to the museum as part of its renovation campaign to create the Broad Contemporary Art Museum and for an art acquisition fund.

The Broads donated $6 million to the Los Angeles Opera to bring Richard Wagner's opera cycle Der Ring des Nibelungen to Los Angeles for the 2009–10 season. In June 2013, the Broads gave $7 million to continue funding the Eli and Edythe Broad general director at L.A. Opera, a position occupied by Plácido Domingo until his resignation from the post in 2019.

The Broads contributed $10 million in 2008 for a programming endowment for a music and performing arts center at Santa Monica College, the Eli and Edythe Broad Stage, and an adjacent black box performance space, the Edye.

In total, the Broads have pledged roughly $1 billion to Los Angeles art institutions. Broad called Los Angeles a "cultural capital of the world".

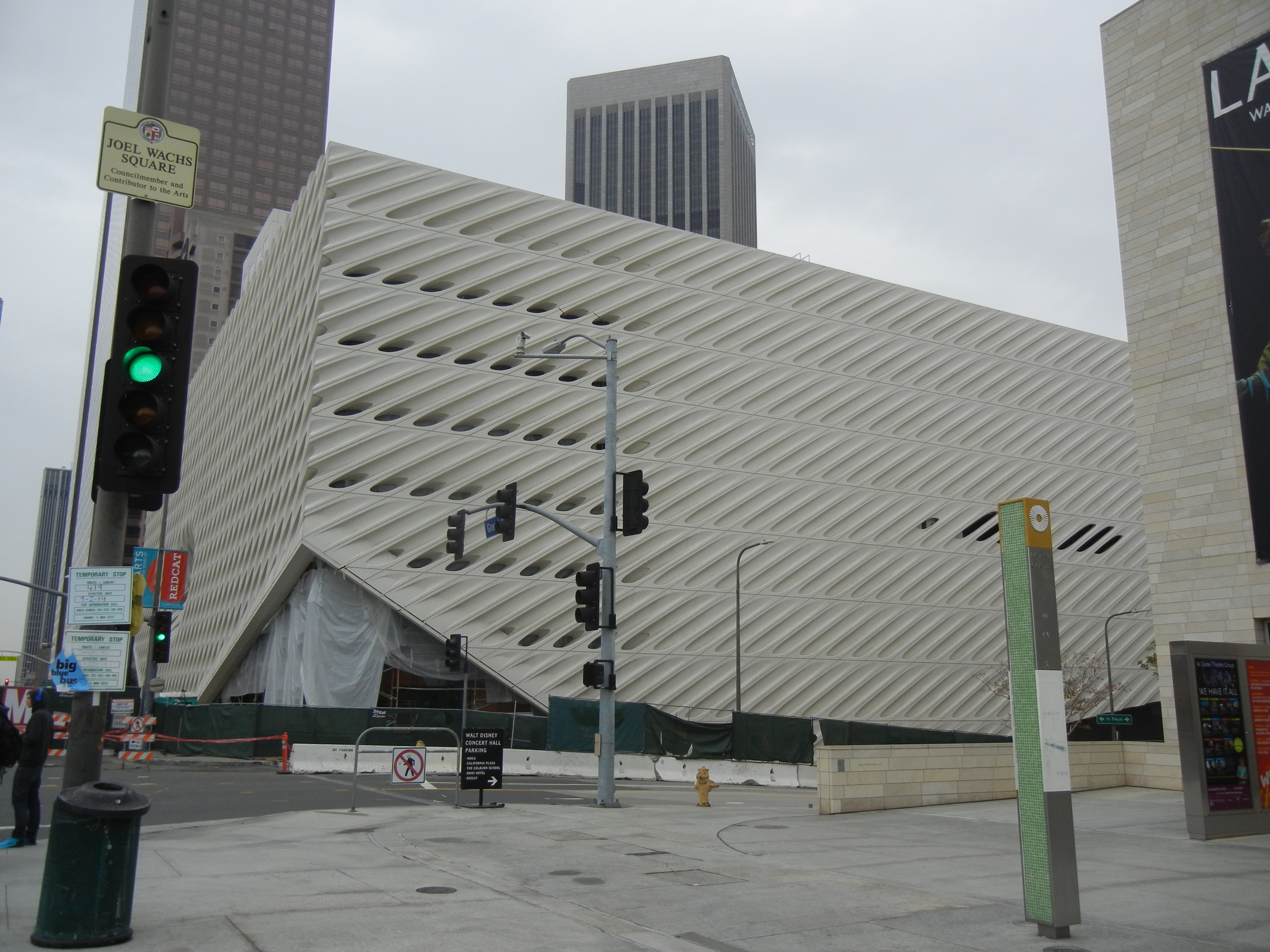
The Broad Museum under construction, 2015

==== The Broad ====
In August 2010, Eli Broad announced that he would build a contemporary art museum in Los Angeles. Diller Scofidio + Renfro were chosen through an architectural competition to design the approximately 120,000-square-foot museum, which includes exhibition space, offices, and a parking garage.

In February 2015, a public preview of a special installation attracted some 3,500 visitors while the museum was still under construction. The Broad was opened by the Broads on Sunday, September 20, 2015. To date, it has received more than 2.5 million visitors.

==== Grand Avenue project ====
In 2000, Broad founded the Grand Avenue Committee, which coordinated and oversaw further development of Grand Avenue in Los Angeles. He was involved in the fundraising campaign to build the Walt Disney Concert Hall, which opened in October 2003. Broad was instrumental in securing the $50 million deposit from the project developer, Related Companies, that opened Grand Park in summer 2012.

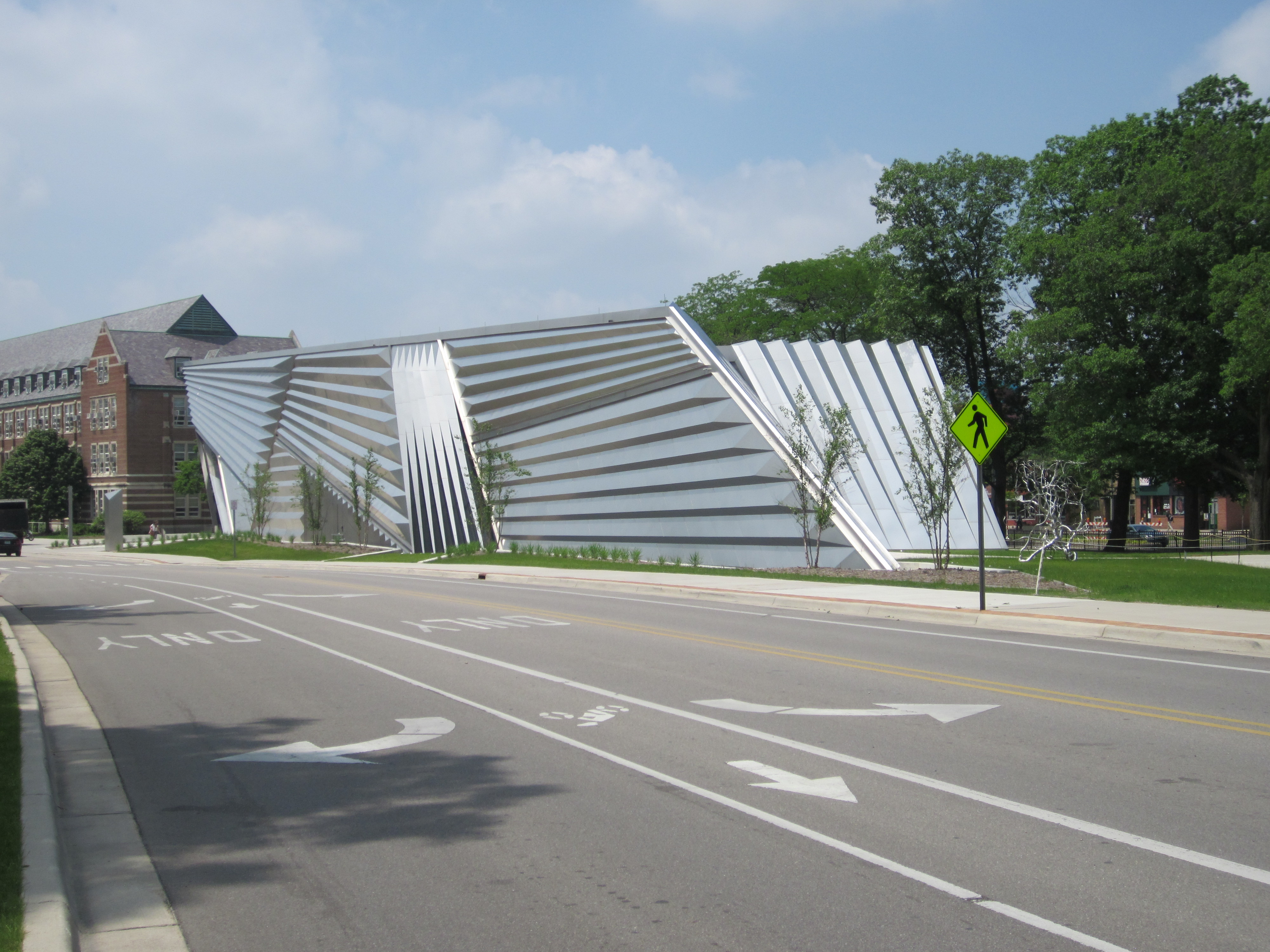
The Eli and Edythe Broad Art Museum of Michigan State University at 547 East Circle Drive, East Lansing, Michigan.

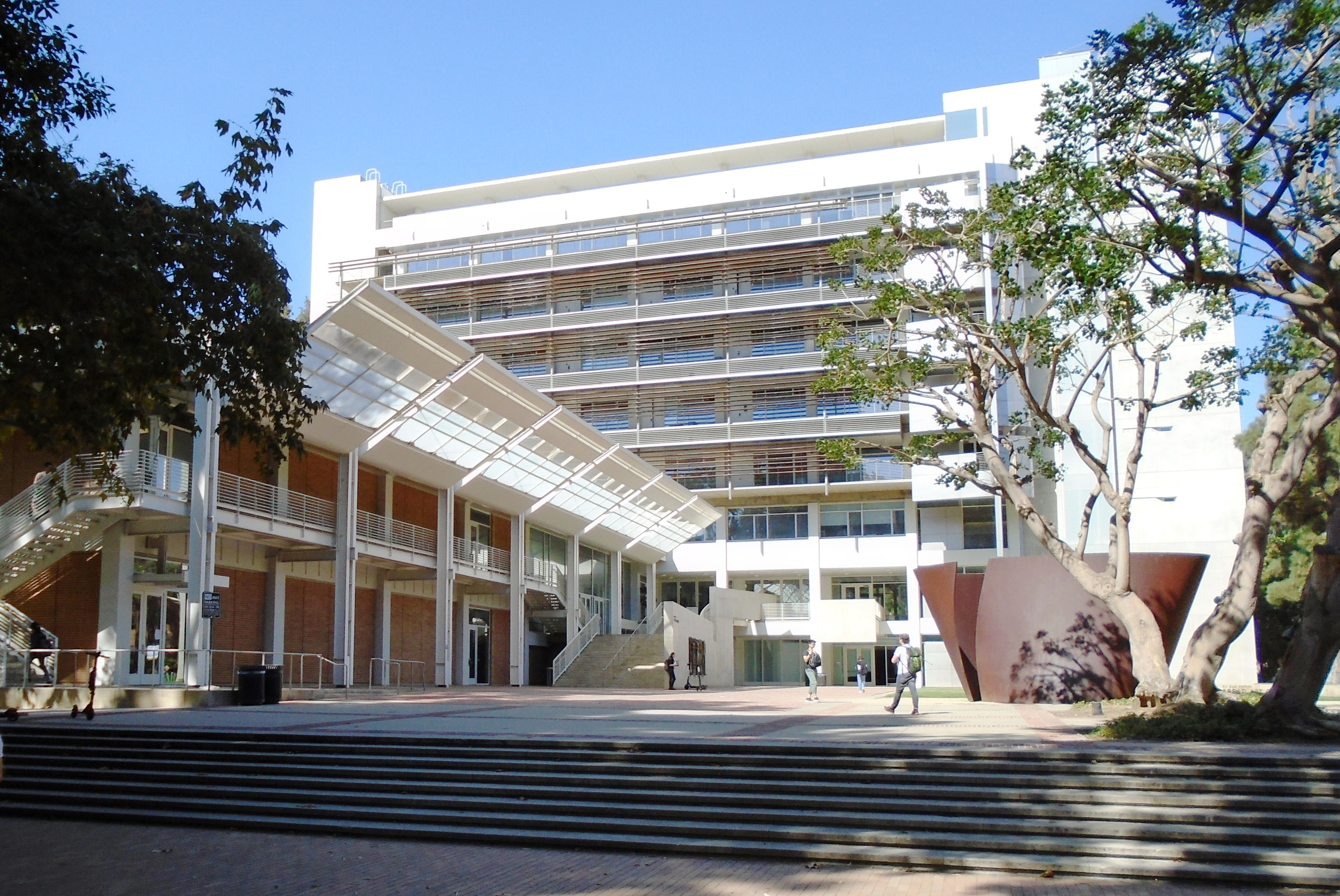
UCLA's Broad Art Center by Richard Meier houses the UCLA School of the Arts and Architecture

==== Higher education philanthropic work ====
Broad's first civic board membership and significant investment in education was a $10 million commitment to Pitzer College in 1970. In 1973, he was named chairman of the board of the educational institution.

In 1991, Broad endowed the Eli Broad College of Business and the Eli Broad Graduate School of Management with $20 million for a full-time MBA program at his alma mater, Michigan State University (MSU). The Broads gave $5 million to endow the Eli and Edythe L. Broad Dean of Business Chair.

In 2000, Broad gave $23.2 million for the Broad Art Center at UCLA, designed by Richard Meier. Eli and Edythe Broad donated $28 million to MSU for the construction of the Eli and Edythe Broad Art Museum, designed by Pritzker Architecture Prize-winning architect Zaha Hadid. The museum opened in November 2012. In 2014, the Broad Foundation announced a $5 million gift to the Broad Art Museum at MSU to support exhibitions. That same year, the Broads also announced a $25 million grant to expand the Eli Broad College of Business, bringing the couples total giving to MSU to nearly $100 million.

=== Scientific and medical research ===
The Broad Foundation's first major investment in scientific and medical research was in the field of inflammatory bowel disease (IBD). Since then, the foundation has expanded its scope to focus on genomics and stem cell research.

In 2001, the Broads created the Broad Medical Research Program to fund innovative research to advance the treatment of IBD. The program was merged with the Crohn's and Colitis Foundation of America in 2013.

In 2003, Eli and Edythe Broad gave the $100 million founding gift to create the Broad Institute of MIT and Harvard, which aims to improve human health by using genomics to advance the understanding of the biology of human disease and lay the groundwork for a new generation of therapies. The following year, they gave another $100 million, and in 2009, they gave another $400 million to create an endowment and make the institute an independent nonprofit. In 2013, the Broads announced an additional $100 million gift to the institute. The Broad Institute now connects more than 4,000 scientists with an annual budget of more than $400 million.

The Eli and Edythe Broad Center for Regenerative Medicine and Stem Cell Research at the University of Southern California (USC) is the product of a public-private partnership between the voter-created California Institute of Regenerative Medicine, the Keck School of Medicine of USC, and the Eli and Edythe Broad Foundation, which donated $30 million in 2006. In 2007, the Broads also donated $20 million to the Eli and Edythe Broad Center of Regenerative Medicine and Stem Cell Research at the University of California, Los Angeles (UCLA). One year later, they gave a major gift to the University of California, San Francisco for the new headquarters of the Eli and Edythe Broad Center of Regeneration Medicine and Stem Cell Research, which opened in February 2011.

Eli Broad was also a life member of the California Institute of Technology (Caltech) Board of Trustees where he funded the Broad Center for the Biological Sciences. In 2009, the Broads gave $5 million to fund the Joint Center for Translational Medicine at Caltech and UCLA. In 2018, the Broads pledged $5 million to Caltech to endow a professorial chair in honor of Caltech President Emeritus David Baltimore.

=== Gun control ===
Starting in 2009, the Broad Foundation funded research on firearm violence and loopholes in gun-safety laws at the Violence Prevention Research Program at the UC Davis School of Medicine and Medical Center. In August 2013, Broad donated $250,000 to oppose the recalls of the President of the Colorado Senate John Morse and Senator Angela Giron, who were being recalled for their support of gun control measures, including a ban on magazines of 15 rounds or more. Broad served on the advisory committee for gun control group Everytown For Gun Safety when it launched in 2014. In 2018, he pledged $1 million to the group.

== Art collection ==
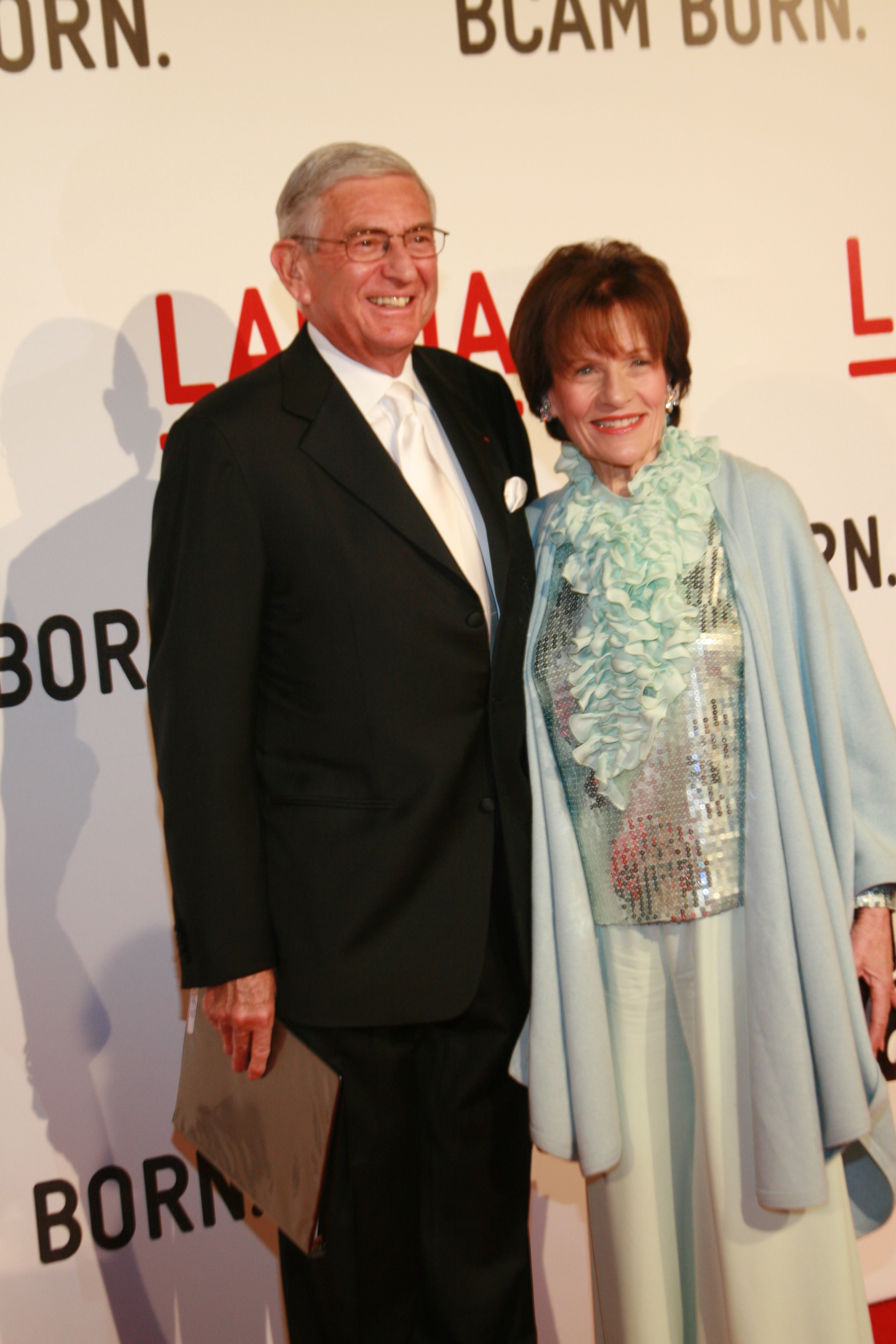
Edythe and Eli Broad at a gala hosted by the Los Angeles County Museum of Art in 2008

Eli Broad was drawn into the art world by his wife Edythe's interest in collecting. Their first major purchase was made in 1973, when he and Edye first acquired a Van Gogh drawing entitled Cabanes a Saintes-Maries, 1888. Art collector and MCA executive Taft Schreiber became their mentor. The Broads' early acquisitions included notable works by Miró, Picasso, and Matisse. Eventually, the pair began to concentrate on post–World War II art.

Eli and Edythe Broad established the Broad Art Foundation in 1984 with the goal of making their extensive contemporary art collection more accessible to the public.

The Broads have two collections focusing on postwar and contemporary art—a personal collection with nearly 600 works and the Broad Art Foundation's collection, which has approximately 1,500 works. About 40% of their collection was bought via dealer Larry Gagosian.

== Personal life ==
In the early 1990s, the Broads commissioned Frank O. Gehry to design their primary residence in Brentwood. It was built by the architecture firm Langdon Wilson based on Gehry's initial designs.

In the late 1990s, Broad paid $5.65 million for two parcels in Malibu and commissioned Richard Meier to design a waterfront home of roughly 5,400 square feet (500 square metres), which was completed in 2002. Two months after Broad's death, the home sold for $51.65 million.

Broad died on April 30, 2021, at the Cedars-Sinai Medical Center in Los Angeles, California after a long illness, at age 87.

== Honors and awards ==
Broad was a Fellow of the American Academy of Arts and Sciences and in 1994 was named Chevalier in the National Order of the Legion of Honor by the Republic of France. In 1998, he received the Golden Plate Award of the American Academy of Achievement. From 2004 to 2009, he served as a regent of the Smithsonian Institution. He received the Carnegie Medal of Philanthropy in 2007 and the David Rockefeller Award from the Museum of Modern Art in March 2009. In October 2013, the Broads were awarded the William E. Simon Prize for Philanthropic Leadership by Philanthropy Roundtable. Broad served on the board of the Future Generation Art Prize. He was named one of Time magazine's 100 Most Influential People in 2016. In 2018, Broad and his wife were named Distinguished Philanthropists at the John F. Kennedy Center for the Performing Arts in Washington, D.C. In the same year, they received the American Federation of the Arts Cultural Leadership award. In 2019, they received honorary degrees from the University of Southern California.

== Books ==
- The Art of Being Unreasonable: Lessons in Unconventional Thinking (ISBN 978-1118173213).

== See also ==
- Whitehead Institute
