= The Broad =

Contemporary art museum in California, US

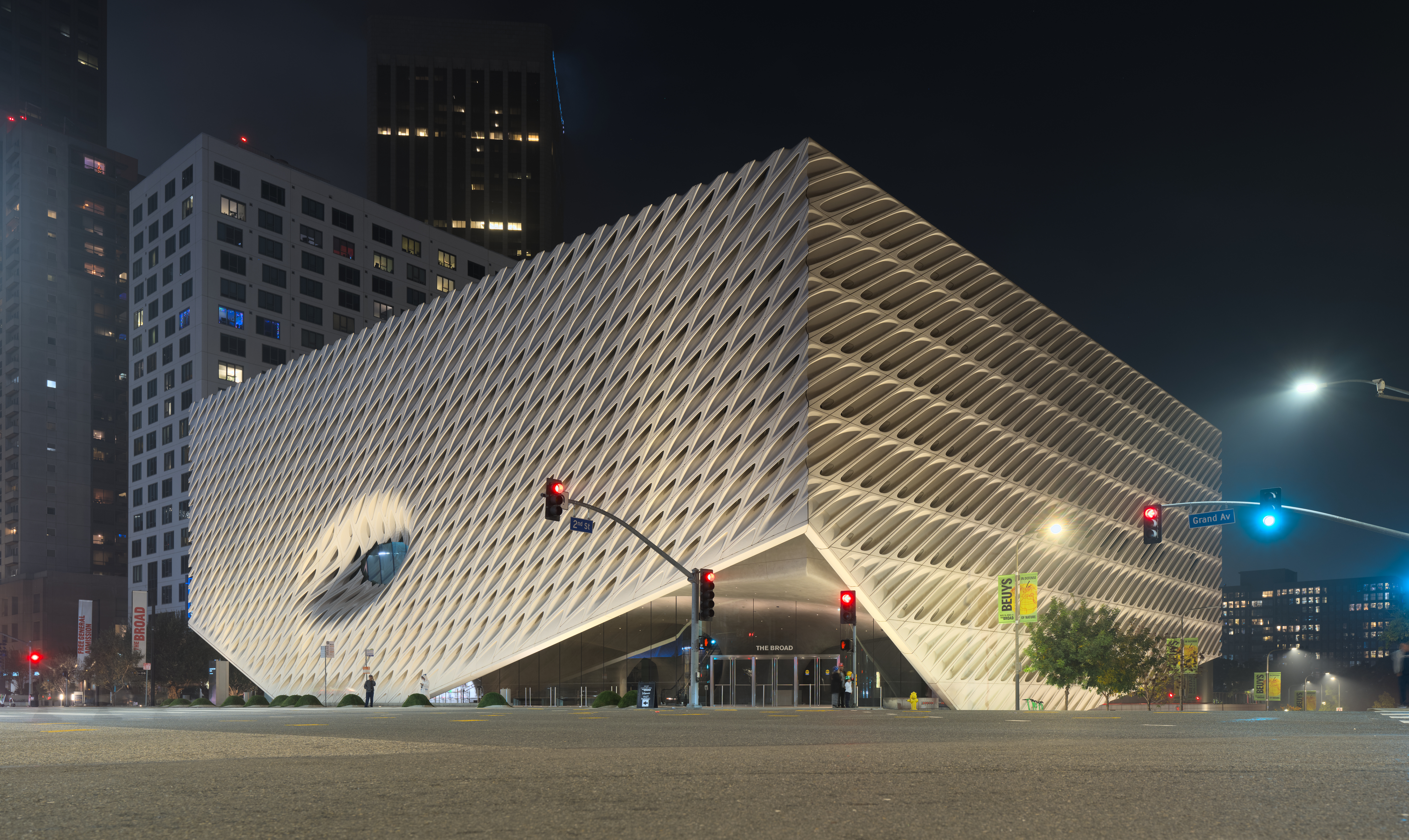
- The Broad museum, 2024
- Established: September 20, 2015
- Location: 221 South Grand Avenue, Downtown Los Angeles, California, US
- Coordinates: 34°03′16″N 118°15′02″W
- Type: Art museum
- Collection size: Almost 2,000
- Founders: Eli Broad and Edythe Broad
- Architect: Diller Scofidio + Renfro
- Public transit access: Los Angeles Metro Rail; E Line; A Line at Grand Avenue Arts/Bunker Hill
- Website: www.thebroad.org

The Broad (/broʊd/ BROHD) is a contemporary art museum on Grand Avenue in Downtown Los Angeles, California, United States. The museum is named for philanthropists Eli and Edythe Broad, who financed the $140 million building that houses the Broad art collections. It offers free general admission to its permanent collection galleries. However, not all of its events are free and admission prices may vary by exhibit or event. It opened on September 20, 2015.

== History ==
Since 2008, Eli and Edythe Broad and the Broad Art Foundation had been considering different sites for a museum for the art collection. In November 2008, the news surfaced that Eli Broad had approached Beverly Hills about building his museum at the southeast corner of Wilshire Boulevard and Santa Monica Boulevard. In January 2010, he revealed that he was considering a 10-acre parcel on the campus of West Los Angeles College just outside Culver City. Meanwhile, in March 2010, the Santa Monica City Council approved an agreement in principle to lease the city-owned 2.5-acre parcel next to the Santa Monica Civic Auditorium to Eli Broad for $1 a year for 99 years while also contributing $1 million toward design costs. Broad would have paid the rest, an estimated $50 million to $70 million.

In August 2010, Eli Broad announced formally that he would build a museum in Downtown Los Angeles. He agreed to pay $7.7 million for a 99-year lease. Officially characterized as a grant, the money subsidized affordable-housing units at The Emerson, a high-rise residential tower next to the museum.

In an invited architectural competition for the project in 2010, six architects were asked to present preliminary designs. They included Dutch architect Rem Koolhaas and his firm Office for Metropolitan Architecture; Swiss pair Herzog & de Meuron; Christian de Portzamparc from Paris; Japanese duo Ryue Nishizawa and Kazuyo Sejima of SANAA; and Diller Scofidio + Renfro from New York. Diller Scofidio + Renfro were eventually chosen to design the approximately 120,000-square-foot museum, which includes exhibition space, offices and a parking garage.

In February 2015, Eli and Edythe Broad hosted a public preview of the new building, attracting some 3,500 visitors.

The museum was opened by the Broads on September 20, 2015. Celebrities in attendance included Bill Clinton, Reese Witherspoon, Matthew Perry, Heidi Klum, and Larry King, among others.

== Architecture ==
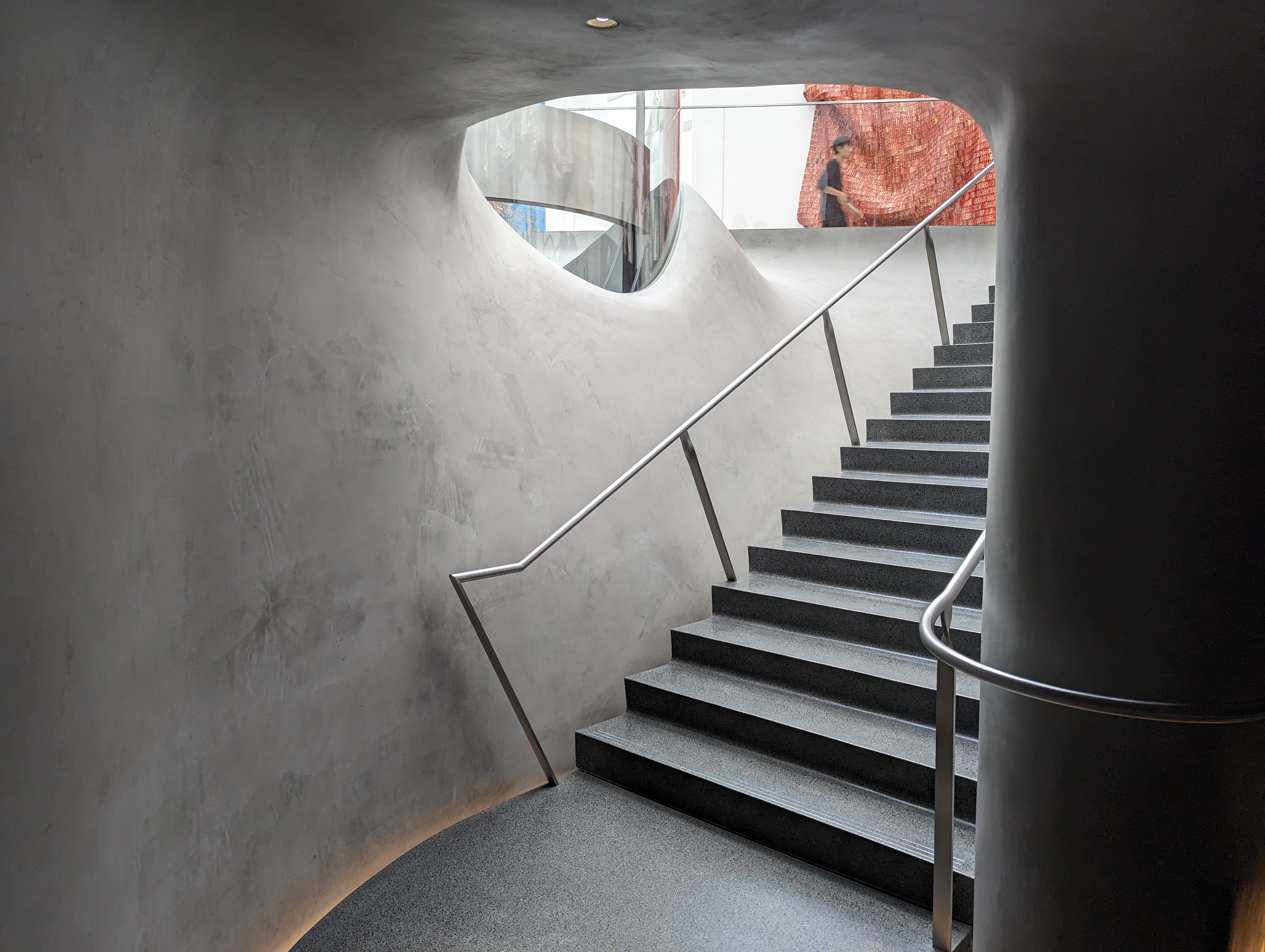
Stairs to the third floor

=== Original building ===
The Broad is housed in a new building designed by architecture firm Diller Scofidio + Renfro in collaboration with Gensler and structural engineering firm Leslie E. Robertson Associates. Its cost has been estimated at $140 million. With a location adjacent to Frank Gehry's iconic Walt Disney Concert Hall, the museum's design is intended to contrast with its bright metallic perforated exterior while respecting its architectural presence by having a porous, "honeycomblike" exterior. The design is based on a concept entitled "the veil and the vault". "The veil" is a porous envelope that wraps the whole building, filtering and transmitting daylight to the indoor space. This skin is composed of 2,500 rhomboidal panels of fiberglass-reinforced concrete supported by a 650-ton steel substructure. The "vault" is a concrete body which forms the core of the building, dedicated to storage, laboratories, curatorial spaces and offices.

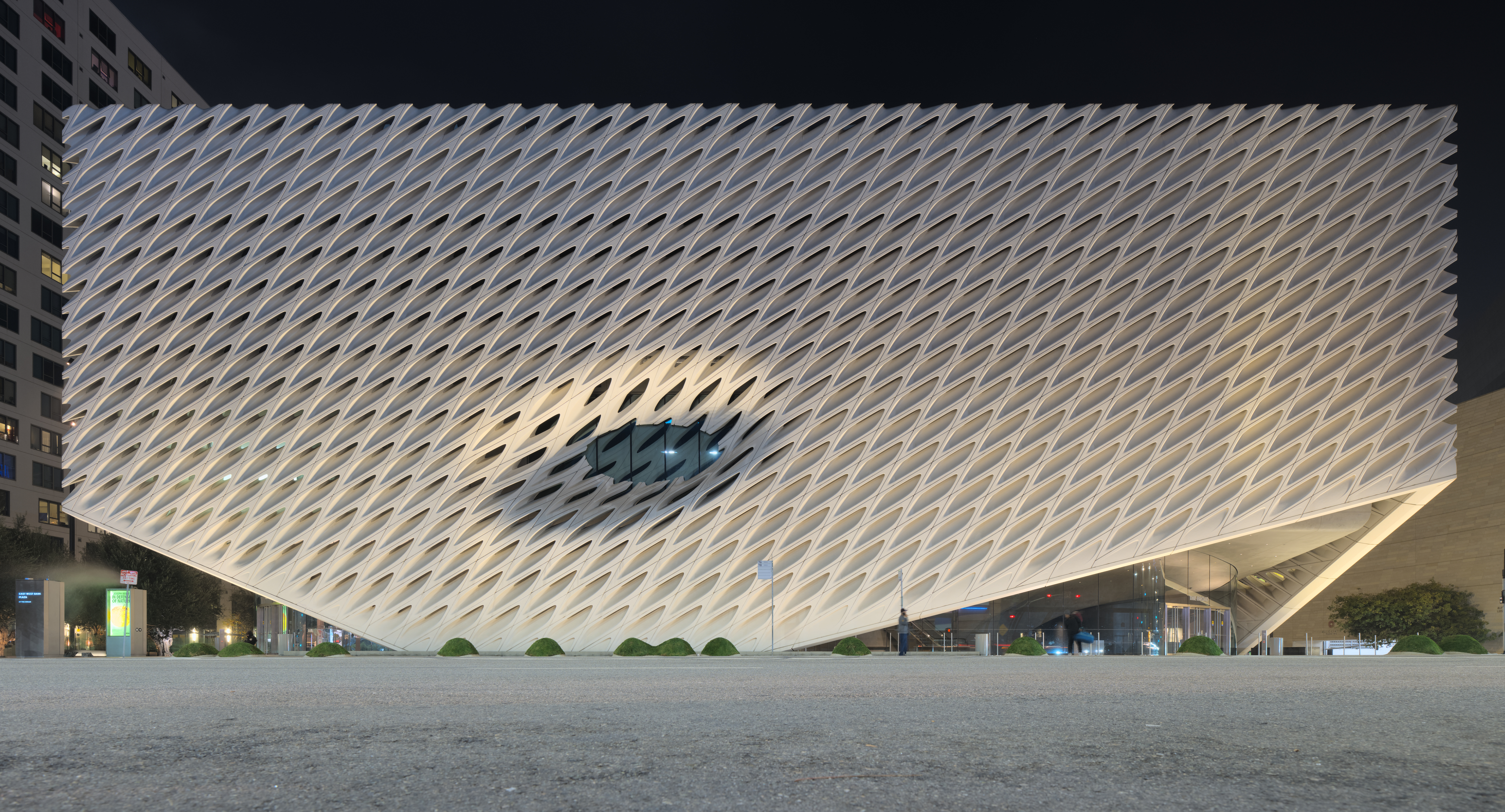
Front view of the Broad

The three-story museum has 50,000 square feet (4,600 m^{2}) of exhibition space on two floors, with 35,000 square feet (3,300 m^{2}) of column-free gallery space on the third floor and 15,000 square feet (1,400 m^{2}) on the first. The roof has 318 skylight monitors that admit diffused sunlight from the north. In the non-Euclidean lobby, there is no front desk; instead, visitor-services associates greet guests with mobile devices. Lobby and exhibitions spaces are connected by a 105-foot escalator and a glass-enclosed elevator.

=== Plans for expansion ===
In 2024, The Broad announced a $100-million, 55,000-square-foot addition behind the existing structure, which would increase gallery space by 70 percent. Designed by Diller Scofidio + Renfro, the addition is to take the form of a second building connecting to the original museum via a third-floor door and passageway leading to a courtyard with views of the sky. The new gallery space will include both artists already in the collection and new artists, such as Cauleen Smith, Lauren Halsey, and Patrick Martinez. The expansion is expected to be completed by the 2028 Summer Olympics in Los Angeles.

=== Museum plaza ===
In 2014, plans were published for a 24,000 square feet (2,200 m^{2}) public plaza adjacent to The Broad, to be overseen and maintained by the museum as part of its agreement with the city. Designed by the museum's architects, Diller, Scofidio + Renfro, and landscape architect Walter J. Hood, the Hilda Solis Plaza plaza, with other streetscape improvements, is estimated to have cost $18 million, with about $10 million coming from redevelopment funds and $8 million from the museum. It features a grove of 100-year-old Barouni olive trees.

=== Construction ===
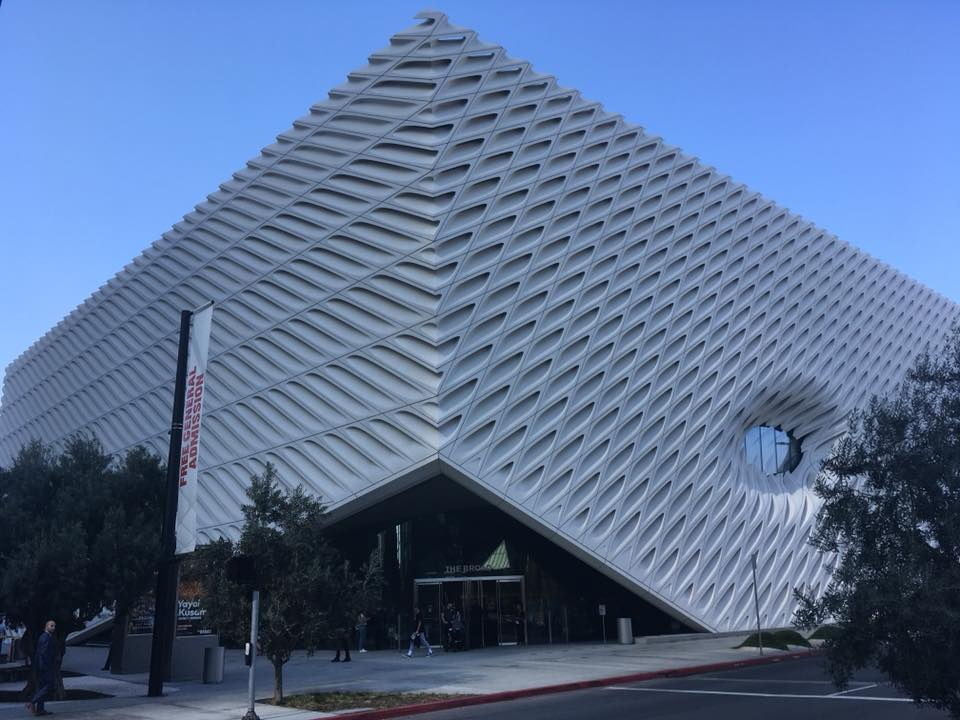
The Broad, 2017

The museum's unorthodox facade, which the architects refer to as the "veil", was unusually difficult to fabricate, leading to delays in construction. In a lawsuit filed in Los Angeles County Superior Court in 2014, the museum sued German fabricator Seele GmbH, Zurich American Insurance Company and the Fidelity and Deposit Company of Maryland for $19.8 million in damages for allegedly failing to deliver the facade's components on schedule. The Broad and Seele subsequently agreed to continue work on the museum and to face off later over the dispute.

=== Structural engineer ===
Nabih Youssef Associates Structural Engineers is the Structural Engineer of Record. The museum and parking garage is a 6-story, 110-feet tall structure occupying a city block and enclosing about 250,000 square feet. Typical floors are two-way concrete slabs spanning to concrete columns sitting on a mix of spread footings and belled caissons. The lateral system is a special reinforced concrete shear walls with long perimeter walls on the north & south sides of the building and short buttressing walls in the opposite direction.

Special features include:

- Veil – Support for the design/build fiber-reinforced concrete veil, a unique cladding structure spanning 70 feet from the roof to lobby level.
- Vault – 5-feet thick mass concrete, post-tensioned and tapered slab cantilevering 45 feet off battered walls to provide a column-free glass lobby space alongside Grand Ave.
- Roof – 190-feet long-span steel roof with a concrete lattice diaphragm providing a column-free top floor gallery across the entire building footprint.

The interior (the Vault) is a large opaque volume that seems to hover in the middle of the space. This space holds the museum art and lending library, archive, lecture hall and offices as well as circulation.

The exterior (the Veil) is composed of 313 different glass fiber reinforced concrete hexagonal blades of varying thickness and transparency, encasing a diagonal steel lattice that together forms an airy, cellular exoskeleton draping the interior space. This space acts as the ceiling over the gallery space, allowing natural light into the space.

The Veil is not intended as a primary lateral system, more like a cladding. The remaining shear wall later system is augmented to account for the removal of the veil lateral element. A typical GFRC panel is about 8 x 5 x 1 feet and weighs approximately 1,100 lbs. At the top of the building, the veil wraps over a cantilevered roof that extends 40 feet over the Grand Avenue façade.

The Veil is supported at three points: the connections on the Second Street and GTK, and the major 32 ton, 57-feet long touchdown beam on Grand Avenue. The Grand Avenue touchdown beam sits five feet below the sidewalk.

The touchdown beam can rock about a central pivot point allowing the entire veil structure to slightly "see-saw" back and forth along its plane during a major earthquake. Each end of the beam is allowed to move up and down by ¾ inches.

== Collection ==
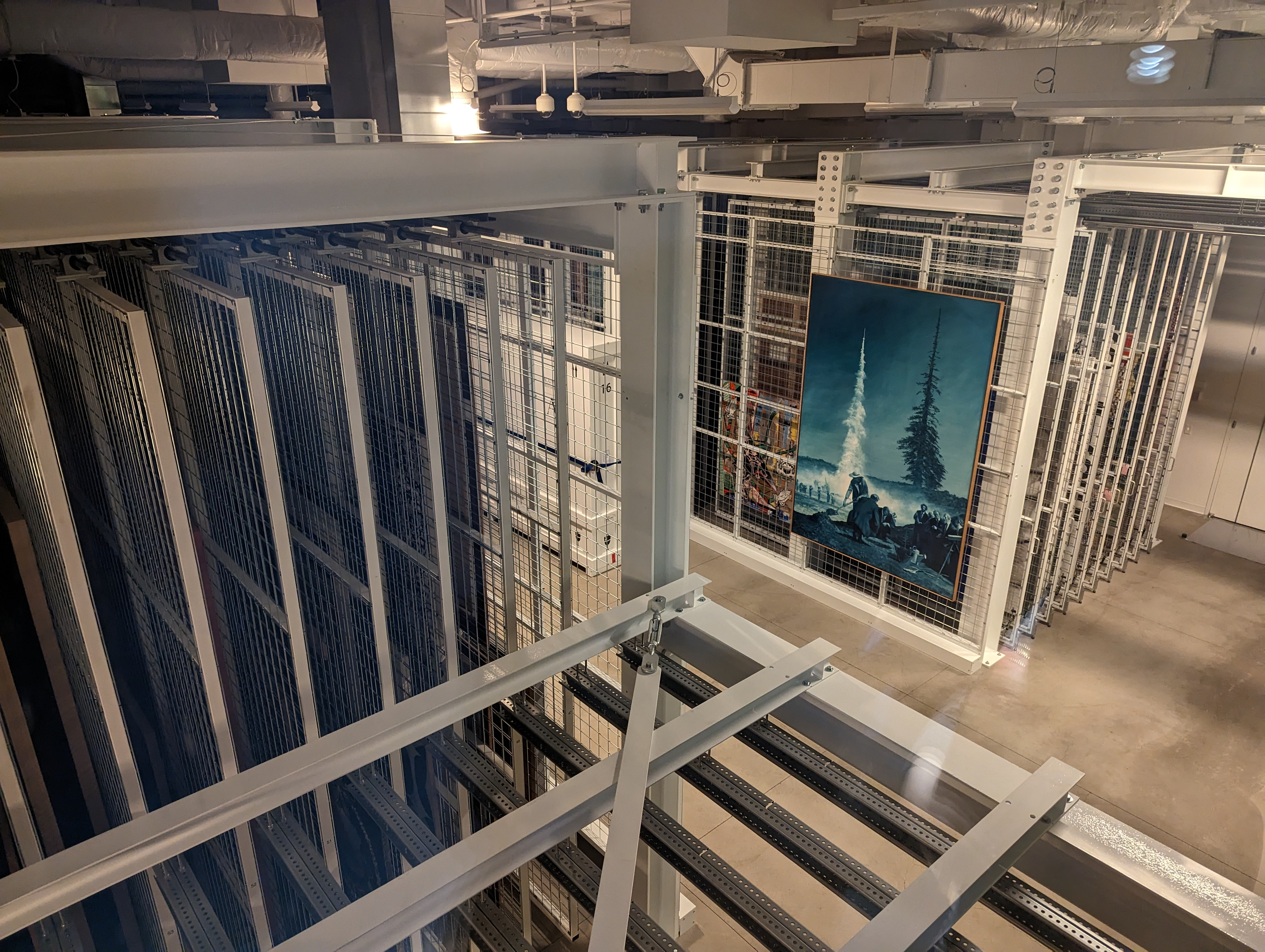
View into the museum's vaults

The Broad houses a nearly 2,000-piece collection of contemporary art featuring 200 artists, including works by Cindy Sherman, Jeff Koons, Ed Ruscha, Roy Lichtenstein and Andy Warhol, including a 1963 "Single Elvis" by the latter.

Other notable installations include Yayoi Kusama's Infinity Mirrored Room – The Souls of Millions of Light Years Away (2013), Ragnar Kjartansson's expansive nine-screen video The Visitors (2012), Julie Mehretu's 24-feet-wide canvas Beloved (Cairo) (2013), and Goshka Macuga's photo-tapestry Death of Marxism, Women of All Lands Unite (2013). The museum also owns the largest collection of Cindy Sherman works worldwide, with 129 pieces.

The collection has been described by The Washington Post as including too much "high-end trash" but "even though the bad overwhelms the great, there are great works throughout".

The building also serves as headquarters for the Broad Art Foundation's lending library of contemporary works.

== Exhibitions ==
The Broad's inaugural exhibition featured a selection of more than 250 paintings, sculptures and photographs by more than 60 artists drawn exclusively from the permanent collection, including John Ahearn, El Anatsui, Richard Artschwager, John Baldessari, Jean-Michel Basquiat, Bernd and Hilla Becher, Joseph Beuys, Mark Bradford, Chris Burden, Chuck Close, John Currin, Eric Fischl, Jack Goldstein, Mark Grotjahn, Keith Haring, Damien Hirst, Jasper Johns, Mike Kelley, Ellsworth Kelly (four paintings), William Kentridge, Anselm Kiefer, Ragnar Kjartansson, Jeff Koons, Barbara Kruger, Yayoi Kusama, Sherrie Levine, Roy Lichtenstein (10 paintings), Glenn Ligon, Sharon Lockhart, Robert Longo, Goshka Macuga, Julie Mehretu, Takashi Murakami, Lari Pittman, Richard Prince, Neo Rauch, Robert Rauschenberg, Charles Ray, Ed Ruscha, Julian Schnabel, Cindy Sherman, Mark Tansey, Robert Therrien, Cy Twombly, Kara Walker, Jeff Wall, Andy Warhol (11 paintings), David Wojnarowicz and Christopher Wool.

== Restaurant ==
The museum includes a free-standing restaurant on its plaza, Otium – Latin for "leisure time" – which Eli Broad developed with Bill Chait of République and Bestia restaurants. It features Timothy Hollingsworth, a former head chef of The French Laundry in Napa Valley, as executive chef. In September 2015, Isolated Elements, 2015, a photographic mural by the artist Damien Hirst was installed on the south facade of the restaurant; it measures nearly 84 feet by 32 feet and is based on Hirst's 1991 sculpture Isolated Elements Swimming in the Same Direction for the Purpose of Understanding, a wall-mounted cabinet filled with fish preserved in formaldehyde.

== Management ==
=== Funding ===
As of 2014, The Broad's endowment is at $200 million, thereby larger than any museum in Los Angeles except for the J. Paul Getty Museum. The overall annual budget is $16 million, which is provided for through established funds. The museum offers mostly free admission to the public, but will charge for temporary special exhibitions.

=== Governance ===
Besides Eli and Edythe Broad, the Broad's Board of Governors also includes art dealer Irving Blum, Los Angeles Philharmonic CEO Deborah Borda, restaurateur Michael Chow, businessman Bruce Karatz, and former ambassador Robert H. Tuttle, among others.

The museum's director is art historian Joanne Heyler.

=== Attendance ===
In its first year, The Broad attracted 753,000 visitors, roughly equivalent to the 2011 attendance at Los Angeles County Museum of Art (LACMA). In 2019, more than 900,000 people visited the museum.
