= XEMS-AM =

Former radio station in Matamoros, Tamaulipas, Mexico

XEMS
Defunct
- Matamoros, Tamaulipas; Mexico
- Frequency: 1490 AM

Programming
- Format: Silent

Ownership
- Owner: Grupo Radio Avanzado; (Sucesión de Antonio Salvador Gallegos Escalante)
- Sister stations: XHMLS-FM, XHNA-FM, XERDO-AM

History
- First air date: July 25, 1952
- Last air date: March 10, 2021, denial of concession renewal
- Call sign meaning: "Matamoros"

Technical information
- Class: C
- Power: 1,000 watts

XEMS-AM was a radio station in Matamoros, Tamaulipas, Mexico, broadcasting to Matamoros and Brownsville, Texas. It broadcast from 1952 to 2021. The last brand that the station carried was Radio Mexicana with a Regional Mexican format.

== History ==
XEMS began broadcasting on 1500 kHz in 1952. It soon moved to 1490 kHz.

On March 10, 2021, the Federal Telecommunications Institute (IFT) denied an application for the renewal of XEMS-AM's concession. The station had failed to pay three of the nine installments of its last renewal, in addition to failure to file two annual reports or pay for its studio–transmitter link frequency. XEMS had been mired in ownership problems which involved the ownership of Antonio Gallegos Escalante's estate among two women with whom he had children.

On January 30, 2026, the company was seized because a judge ruled in favor of the station's former employees for unfair dismissal.
