= La Feria North, Texas =

- Census-designated place
- Coordinates: 26°10′47″N 97°49′31″W
- Country: United States
- State: Texas
- County: Cameron

Area
  - Total: 1.1 sq mi (2.9 km^{2})
  - Land: 1.1 sq mi (2.8 km^{2})
  - Water: 0.039 sq mi (0.1 km^{2})
- Elevation: 56 ft (17 m)

Population (2020)
  - Total: 225
  - Density: 210/sq mi (80/km^{2})
- Time zone: UTC-6 (Central (CST))
  - Summer (DST): UTC-5 (CDT)
- FIPS code: 48-40210
- GNIS feature ID: 1852717

La Feria North is a census-designated place (CDP) in Cameron County, Texas, United States. The population was 225 at the 2020 census. It is part of the Brownsville–Harlingen Metropolitan Statistical Area.

== Geography ==
La Feria North is located in western Cameron County at 26°10′47″N 97°49′31″W (26.179752, -97.825158). It is bordered to the south by the city of La Feria. Via Interstate 2/U.S. Route 83, it is 9 miles (14 km) west of Harlingen and 6 miles (10 km) east of Mercedes.

According to the United States Census Bureau, La Feria North has a total area of 1.1 square miles (2.9 km^{2}), of which 1.1 square miles (2.8 km^{2}) is land and 0.04 square miles (0.1 km^{2}), or 4.51%, is water.

== Demographics ==
Historical population
| Census | Pop. | Note | %± |
|---|---|---|---|
| 2000 | 168 | | — |
| 2010 | 212 | | 26.2% |
| 2020 | 225 | | 6.1% |
U.S. Decennial Census; 1850–1900 1910; 1920 1930 1940; 1950 1960 1970; 1980 1990 2000; 2010 2020

La Feria North first appeared as a census designated place in the 2000 U.S. census.

=== 2020 census ===
La Feria North CDP, Texas – Racial and ethnic composition Note: the US Census treats Hispanic/Latino as an ethnic category. This table excludes Latinos from the racial categories and assigns them to a separate category. Hispanics/Latinos may be of any race.
| Race / Ethnicity (NH = Non-Hispanic) | Pop 2000 | Pop 2010 | Pop 2020 | % 2000 | % 2010 | % 2020 |
|---|---|---|---|---|---|---|
| White alone (NH) | 39 | 62 | 34 | 23.21% | 29.25% | 15.11% |
| Black or African American alone (NH) | 1 | 0 | 1 | 0.60% | 0.00% | 0.44% |
| Native American or Alaska Native alone (NH) | 0 | 0 | 2 | 0.00% | 0.00% | 0.89% |
| Asian alone (NH) | 0 | 0 | 0 | 0.00% | 0.00% | 0.00% |
| Native Hawaiian or Pacific Islander alone (NH) | 0 | 0 | 0 | 0.00% | 0.00% | 0.00% |
| Other race alone (NH) | 0 | 0 | 0 | 0.00% | 0.00% | 0.00% |
| Mixed race or Multiracial (NH) | 0 | 0 | 3 | 0.00% | 0.00% | 1.33% |
| Hispanic or Latino (any race) | 128 | 150 | 185 | 76.19% | 70.75% | 82.22% |
| Total | 168 | 212 | 225 | 100.00% | 100.00% | 100.00% |

As of the census of 2000, there were 168 people, 47 households, and 39 families residing in the CDP. The population density was 144.0 inhabitants per square mile (55.6/km^{2}). There were 50 housing units at an average density of 42.9 per square mile (16.6/km^{2}). The racial makeup of the CDP was 70.83% White, 0.60% African American, 2.98% Asian, 23.81% from other races, and 1.79% from two or more races. Hispanic or Latino of any race were 76.19% of the population.

There were 47 households, out of which 48.9% had children under the age of 18 living with them, 63.8% were married couples living together, 17.0% had a female householder with no husband present, and 14.9% were non-families. 10.6% of all households were made up of individuals, and 4.3% had someone living alone who was 65 years of age or older. The average household size was 3.57 and the average family size was 3.93.

In the CDP, the population was spread out, with 38.1% under the age of 18, 12.5% from 18 to 24, 17.3% from 25 to 44, 22.6% from 45 to 64, and 9.5% who were 65 years of age or older. The median age was 24 years. For every 100 females, there were 88.8 males. For every 100 females age 18 and over, there were 92.6 males.

The median income for a household in the CDP was $61,250, and the median income for a family was $62,604. Males had a median income of $24,250 versus $11,875 for females. The per capita income for the CDP was $12,010. About 37.2% of families and 41.6% of the population were below the poverty line, including 77.3% of those under the age of eighteen and none of those 65 or over.

== Education ==
La Feria North is served by the La Feria Independent School District.

In addition, South Texas Independent School District operates magnet schools that serve the community.
