= KFRQ =

Classic Rock Radio station in Harlingen, Texas

- Harlingen, Texas; United States
- Broadcast area: Rio Grande Valley; Matamoros and Reynosa, Tamaulipas, Mexico.
- Frequency: 94.5 MHz (HD Radio)
- Branding: Q94.5

Programming
- Format: Classic rock

Ownership
- Owner: Entravision Communications; (Entravision Holdings, LLC)
- Sister stations: KKPS, KNVO-FM, KVLY

History
- First air date: 1960; 66 years ago
- Former call signs: KELT (1960–1967); KELT-FM (1967–1972); KELT (1972–1983); KELT-FM (1983–1986); KELT (1986–1992)
- Call sign meaning: “K-Frog” (former branding)

Technical information
- Licensing authority: FCC
- Facility ID: 56484
- Class: C
- ERP: 100,000 watts
- HAAT: 453 m (1,486 ft)

Links
- Public license information: Public file; LMS
- Webcast: Listen live
- Website: q945allrock.com

KFRQ (94.5 FM) is a radio station broadcasting a classic rock format. Licensed to Harlingen, Texas, United States, the station serves the Rio Grande Valley area. The station is currently owned by Entravision. It shares a studio with its sister stations in McAllen, Texas, while its transmitter is located in La Feria, Texas.

== History ==
The station began around 1960 as easy listening station KELT-FM and was co-owned with KGBT AM and television. Some of the TV personalities such as anchorman Frank "FM" Sullivan and weathercaster Larry James hosted music programs on the station. Frank's wife Hilda Sullivan would anchor locally produced newsbreaks called "Micronews." The station would soon automate and update the programming to adult contemporary using Drake-Chenault's "Hit Parade". The station would later change to country music as "K-Frog" and would on March 1, 1992, change its call sign to the current KFRQ. On January 1, 1995, the station changed formats to rock under the direction of Program Director Alan Sells. On December 15, 2017, Entravision conducted a corporate restructure, firing over half the air staff, including their morning show hosts for over 20 years, Big Al and Charlie.

On April 13, 2020, KFRQ shifted their format from active rock to classic rock, still under the "Q94.5" name. The change came two weeks after sister station KKPS changed their format from Regional Mexican to Bilingual Rhythmic CHR. Sister station KVLY also switched their format from Contemporary hit radio back to Adult Contemporary the same day. With the change, this brought back the Classic rock format to the Rio Grande Valley for the first since 2015, when iHeartMedia-owned station KQXX-FM dropped that format for a simulcast of Hot AC-formatted station KHKZ, also owned by iHeartMedia. KRIX also flipped to Classic Rock on the same day, thus sparking a “Classic Rock” war between both stations.

On March 8, 2024, KFRQ temporarily went off the air shortly after 10 am, as a result of the KGBT-TV tower in La Feria, Texas (which the station's tower transmits from) being brought down after two of its 24 guy wires snapped. The station went back on the air shortly after 12 pm. KBTQ (owned by Latino Media Network) was also affected.
