= KGBT =

KGBT may refer to:

- KGBT-FM, a radio station (98.5 FM) licensed to McAllen, Texas, United States
- KGBT-TV, a television station (channel 4 virtual/18 digital) licensed to Harlingen, Texas, United States
- KYWW, a radio station (1530 AM) licensed to Harlingen, Texas, United States, which held the call sign KGBT from 1954 to 2025
