= Solis, Texas =

- Census-designated place
- Coordinates: 26°10′6″N 97°50′46″W
- Country: United States
- State: Texas
- County: Cameron

Area
  - Total: 1.64 sq mi (4.24 km^{2})
  - Land: 1.63 sq mi (4.21 km^{2})
  - Water: 0.012 sq mi (0.03 km^{2})
- Elevation: 59 ft (18 m)

Population (2020)
  - Total: 722
  - Density: 444/sq mi (171/km^{2})
- Time zone: UTC-6 (Central (CST))
  - Summer (DST): UTC-5 (CDT)
- FIPS code: 48-68678
- GNIS feature ID: 1852767

Solis is a census-designated place (CDP) in Cameron County, Texas, United States. The population was 722 at the 2020 census. It is part of the Brownsville–Harlingen Metropolitan Statistical Area.

== Geography ==
Solis is located in western Cameron County at 26°10′06″N 97°50′46″W, west of the city of La Feria. The CDP has two separate sections, northern and southern, separated by an extension of the La Feria city limits, which follow the Interstate 2/U.S. Route 83 freeway west of the city center. Solis is bordered to the north by the Ratamosa CDP. Harlingen is 10 miles (16 km) to the east, and McAllen is 25 miles (40 km) to the west via I-2.

According to the United States Census Bureau, the Solis CDP has a total area of 1.6 square miles (4.2 km^{2}), of which 0.01 square miles (0.03 km^{2}), or 0.67%, is water.

== Demographics ==
Historical population
Census	Pop.	Note	%±
2000	545		—
2010	512		−6.1%
2020	722		41.0%
U.S. Decennial Census; 1850–1900 1910; 1920 1930 1940; 1950 1960 1970; 1980 1990 2000; 2010 2020

Solis first appeared as a census designated place in the 2000 U.S. census.

=== 2020 census ===
Solis CDP, Texas – Racial and ethnic composition Note: the US Census treats Hispanic/Latino as an ethnic category. This table excludes Latinos from the racial categories and assigns them to a separate category. Hispanics/Latinos may be of any race.
Race / Ethnicity (NH = Non-Hispanic)	Pop 2000	Pop 2010	Pop 2020	% 2000	% 2010	% 2020
White alone (NH)	140	77	53	25.69%	15.04%	7.34%
Black or African American alone (NH)	0	0	0	0.00%	0.00%	0.00%
Native American or Alaska Native alone (NH)	0	1	1	0.00%	0.20%	0.14%
Asian alone (NH)	0	0	4	0.00%	0.00%	0.55%
Native Hawaiian or Pacific Islander alone (NH)	1	0	0	0.18%	0.00%	0.00%
Other race alone (NH)	0	0	0	0.00%	0.00%	0.00%
Mixed race or Multiracial (NH)	8	4	7	1.47%	0.78%	0.97%
Hispanic or Latino (any race)	396	430	657	72.66%	83.98%	91.00%
Total	545	512	722	100.00%	100.00%	100.00%

As of the census of 2000, there were 545 people, 163 households, and 127 families residing in the CDP. The population density was 259.3 inhabitants per square mile (100.1/km^{2}). There were 208 housing units at an average density of 99.0 per square mile (38.2/km^{2}). The racial makeup of the CDP was 80.92% White, 0.18% Pacific Islander, 16.15% from other races, and 2.75% from two or more races. Hispanic or Latino of any race were 72.66% of the population.

There were 163 households, out of which 41.7% had children under the age of 18 living with them, 59.5% were married couples living together, 14.7% had a female householder with no husband present, and 21.5% were non-families. 17.8% of all households were made up of individuals, and 9.8% had someone living alone who was 65 years of age or older. The average household size was 3.34 and the average family size was 3.90.

In the CDP, the population was spread out, with 34.3% under the age of 18, 12.3% from 18 to 24, 25.7% from 25 to 44, 15.4% from 45 to 64, and 12.3% who were 65 years of age or older. The median age was 30 years. For every 100 females, there were 101.9 males. For every 100 females age 18 and over, there were 91.4 males.

The median income for a household in the CDP was $34,861, and the median income for a family was $42,031. Males had a median income of $31,250 versus $25,417 for females. The per capita income for the CDP was $10,319. None of the families and 5.9% of the population were living below the poverty line, including no under eighteens and 41.1% of those over 64.

== Education ==
Solis is served by the La Feria Independent School District.

In addition, South Texas Independent School District operates magnet schools that serve the community.
