= KRIO =

KRIO may refer to:

- KRIO (AM), a radio station (910 AM) licensed to McAllen, Texas, United States
- KRIO-FM, a radio station (97.7 FM) licensed to Roma, Texas, United States
