= KVLY (FM) =

Radio station in Edinburg, Texas

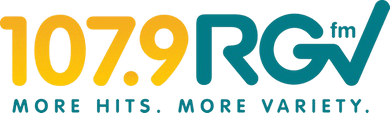
- Edinburg, Texas; United States
- Broadcast area: Rio Grande Valley; Matamoros and Reynosa, Tamaulipas, Mexico.
- Frequency: 107.9 MHz (HD Radio)
- Branding: 107.9 RGV FM

Programming
- Format: Adult contemporary

Ownership
- Owner: Entravision Communications; (Entravision Holdings, LLC)
- Sister stations: KFRQ; KKPS; KNVO-FM

History
- First air date: September 12, 1974
- Former call signs: KESI (1974–1979)
- Call sign meaning: Rio Grande Valley

Technical information
- Licensing authority: FCC
- Facility ID: 67188
- Class: C1
- ERP: 100,000 watts
- HAAT: 257 meters (843 ft)
- Transmitter coordinates: 26°5′19.3″N 98°3′45″W

Links
- Public license information: Public file; LMS
- Webcast: Listen live
- Website: www.1079rgvfm.com

KVLY (107.9 MHz) is a commercial FM radio station licensed to Edinburg, Texas, United States, and serving the Rio Grande Valley. The station is currently owned by Entravision Communications and broadcasts an adult contemporary radio format, switching to Christmas music for part of December. It shares studios and offices on North Jackson Road in McAllen with its sister stations: KFRQ, KKPS and KNVO-FM.

KVLY has an effective radiated power (ERP) of 100,000 watts, the maximum for most FM stations in the U.S. The transmitter is on East Levee Road South, 6 miles (9.7 km) south of Donna, Texas.

== History ==
=== Beautiful music ===
On September 12, 1974, the station first signed on the air. It was owned by Lloyd Hawkins, with the call sign KESI, representing an easy listening format. It was automated, carrying beautiful music supplied by Bonneville. KESI played quarter hour sweeps of soft, mostly instrumental cover versions of popular songs, as well as Broadway and Hollywood show tunes. Hawkins also owned KURV (710 AM).

After a fire destroyed the building housing both stations, Hawkins sold KESI to Henry B. Tippie. Tippie purchased the Yazoo lawnmower sales and service building and renovated it using the plans of chief engineer Mike Hales, who also designed the studios of KURV after the fire. Tippie then purchased radio stations KRIO in McAllen and KNCN in Corpus Christi, Texas. In 1979, KESI switched its call letters to KVLY, representing the Rio Grande Valley.

=== Adult contemporary ===
As the beautiful music format began to age in the 1980s, KVLY made the transition to soft adult contemporary and eliminated the instrumental music. It played well-known adult hits dating back to the 1960s, including a nightly "Love Songs" program. "Love Songs" was hosted by Rennae Valentine (Ivy Easterly), airing 1960s, 1970s, and 1980s hit love ballads. Callers wishing to make special dedications could ask for specific titles. Rennae Valentine left in 2007 for Clear Channel's (now iHeartMedia) KTEX in Weslaco, Texas.

In 2008, KVLY cancelled "Love Songs" (which by then aired on Sunday–Thursday nights) in favor of more upbeat music and the new Top 8 at 8:00. At this point, KVLY was classified as a hot adult contemporary radio station with a target audience of adults 18–49.

On August 31, 2009, KVLY moved the Billy Bush show to 10 pm in favor of a new local love songs program titled Heartbeats, airing from 7 to 10 pm (Monday–Friday nights). The Billy Bush show returned to the 7 pm – 11 pm hours in July 2010.

=== Top 40 era (2010–2020) ===
In August 2010, the station started playing more top hits, becoming more of a Mainstream Top 40. This was done in order to compete with rivals KBFM and XHAVO-FM. Mediabase and Nielsen BDS moved KVLY to the contemporary hit radio panel by February 2011.

In April 2011, KVLY ushered in a new program branded as "The Nightly Hook-Up" which consisted of the only live music mixing week nights and during the weekends. This was done in order to compete with rival KBFM and their pre-recorded mixshow in the evenings. The original programming for "The Nightly Hook-Up" began from the 10 pm – midnight slot weeknights and 6 pm – midnight on Saturday nights. The show was eventually added to the 5 pm hour weekdays in order to counter other rival's shows at this time.

On September 19, 2011, the station saw an increase in listeners and "The Nightly Hook-Up" was moved to the prime time slot weeknights during the premiere of "Nani's Neighborhood" from 8 pm – 10 pm, while keeping all other original times of "The Nightly Hook-Up" as established, thus sparking a "mix war" with rival KBFM. "The Nightly Hook-Up" was the only "live" mixshow in the McAllen-Brownsville-Harlingen market that allows listeners to instantly call in and request a song to be "mixed" in.

In August 2011, Entravision Communications added Radio Production Director, AJ Leal to head up the Valley's only live mid-day program in the McAllen-Brownsville-Harlingen Radio market, instituting a new show, "New At Noon" in Spring 2012. The show's mission is to introduce never-before-heard songs (soon to be released for Radio play) first. In 2012, Program Director Alex Duran, gave the go-ahead to utilize AJ Leal's production capabilities to energize the imaging effect of 107.9 Mix FM and introduced a new "Mainstream Top 40" sound.

In February 2015, AJ Leal was quietly removed from all duties at 107.9 Mix FM due to legal issues and was replaced with other on-air personalities filling in the noon spot.

Unlike many Top 40 radio stations, the station included some reggaeton and bachata songs (which are often played on some Spanish radio stations).

In December 2017, the staff was notified of budget cuts and thus led to the release of several on-air talents from KVLY and sister stations within the company. KVLY began carrying The Kidd Kraddick Morning Show from KHKS Dallas, replacing the local morning show of Alex and Meridee.

=== Second adult contemporary era (2020–present) ===
On April 13, 2020, KVLY changed its format from contemporary hit radio back to the previous adult contemporary format, branded as "107.9 RGV FM". The change came two weeks after sister station KKPS changed its format from Regional Mexican to bilingual rhythmic CHR. With the change, The Kidd Kraddick Morning Show was dropped and long time afternoon host Roxy was moved to mornings.

KVLY is one of the few AC stations across the country to not have jingles on its station.

On September 16, 2021, the station started airing “The 80s at 8”, Monday–Friday at 8 am. The program is currently hosted by Roxy. In addition, the station started adding more 1980s songs to its playlist.

==== Christmas music ====
KVLY flipped to Christmas music on November 27, 2020, joining the many AC stations across the country that had already made the switch to 24/7 Christmas music in early November. That made it the first Rio Grande Valley radio station to play all Christmas music, since 2016 when Hot AC-formatted station KHKZ (owned by iHeartMedia) discontinued the tradition.

For the 2021 holiday season, the station did not switch to 24/7 Christmas music in November, choosing to flip to Christmas music on December 12, 2021, instead.

For the 2022 and 2023 holiday season the station switched to 24/7 Christmas music on December 1.

For the 2024 holiday season the station switched to 24/7 Christmas music on November 29, 2024, rejoining the many AC stations across the country that had already made the switch in early November, for the first time since 2020.

For the 2025 holiday season the station switched to 24/7 Christmas music on Thanksgiving day (November 27, 2025), joining the many AC stations across the country that had already made the switch in early November, for the second consecutive year and the first time to make the switch on Thanksgiving.
