= Ratamosa, Texas =

- Census-designated place
- Coordinates: 26°12′24″N 97°50′59″W
- Country: United States
- State: Texas
- County: Cameron

Area
  - Total: 1.99 sq mi (5.16 km^{2})
  - Land: 1.98 sq mi (5.13 km^{2})
  - Water: 0.012 sq mi (0.03 km^{2})
- Elevation: 52 ft (16 m)

Population (2020)
  - Total: 197
  - Density: 99.5/sq mi (38.4/km^{2})
- Time zone: UTC-6 (Central (CST))
  - Summer (DST): UTC-5 (CDT)
- FIPS code: 48-60686
- GNIS feature ID: 1852759

Ratamosa is a census-designated place (CDP) in Cameron County, Texas, United States. The population was 197 at the 2020 census. It is part of the Brownsville–Harlingen Metropolitan Statistical Area.

== Geography ==
Ratamosa is located in western Cameron County at 26°12′24″N 97°50′59″W (26.206570, -97.849640). It is bordered to the south by Solis and is 5 miles (8 km) northwest of La Feria.

According to the United States Census Bureau, the Ratamosa CDP has a total area of 1.99 square miles (5.16 km^{2}), of which 1.98 square miles (5.13 km^{2}) is land and 0.01 square miles (0.03 km^{2}), or 0.51%, is water.

== Demographics ==
Historical population
Census	Pop.	Note	%±
2000	218		—
2010	254		16.5%
2020	197		−22.4%
U.S. Decennial Census; 1850–1900 1910; 1920 1930 1940; 1950 1960 1970; 1980 1990 2000; 2010 2020

Ratamosa first appeared as a census designated place in the 2000 U.S. census.

=== 2020 census ===
Ratamosa CDP, Texas – Racial and ethnic composition Note: the US Census treats Hispanic/Latino as an ethnic category. This table excludes Latinos from the racial categories and assigns them to a separate category. Hispanics/Latinos may be of any race.
Race / Ethnicity (NH = Non-Hispanic)	Pop 2000	Pop 2010	Pop 2020	% 2000	% 2010	% 2020
White alone (NH)	58	67	52	26.61%	26.38%	26.40%
Black or African American alone (NH)	0	0	0	0.00%	0.00%	0.00%
Native American or Alaska Native alone (NH)	0	0	8	0.00%	0.00%	4.06%
Asian alone (NH)	0	0	0	0.00%	0.00%	0.00%
Native Hawaiian or Pacific Islander alone (NH)	0	0	0	0.00%	0.00%	0.00%
Other race alone (NH)	0	0	2	0.00%	0.00%	1.02%
Mixed race or Multiracial (NH)	0	1	2	0.00%	0.39%	1.02%
Hispanic or Latino (any race)	160	186	133	73.39%	73.23%	67.51%
Total	218	254	197	100.00%	100.00%	100.00%

As of the census of 2000, there were 218 people, 71 households, and 56 families residing in the CDP. The population density was 108.5 inhabitants per square mile (41.9/km^{2}). There were 115 housing units at an average density of 57.2 per square mile (22.1/km^{2}). The racial makeup of the CDP was 81.19% White, 1.83% Native American, 16.51% from other races, and 0.46% from two or more races. Hispanic or Latino of any race were 73.39% of the population.

There were 71 households, out of which 31.0% had children under the age of 18 living with them, 62.0% were married couples living together, 9.9% had a female householder with no husband present, and 21.1% were non-families. 15.5% of all households were made up of individuals, and 5.6% had someone living alone who was 65 years of age or older. The average household size was 3.07 and the average family size was 3.46.

In the CDP, the population was spread out, with 26.6% under the age of 18, 8.7% from 18 to 24, 25.2% from 25 to 44, 26.6% from 45 to 64, and 12.8% who were 65 years of age or older. The median age was 37 years. For every 100 females, there were 86.3 males. For every 100 females age 18 and over, there were 95.1 males.

The median income for a household in the CDP was $85,000, and the median income for a family was $85,000. Males had a median income of $51,667 versus $8,250 for females. The per capita income for the CDP was $22,302. About 21.7% of families and 25.6% of the population were below the poverty line, including none of those under the age of eighteen and 56.7% of those 65 or over.

== Education ==
Ratamosa is served by the La Feria Independent School District.

In addition, South Texas Independent School District operates magnet schools that serve the community.
