= KVLY =

KVLY may refer to:

- KVLY-TV, a television station (digital channel 36, virtual 11) licensed to Fargo, North Dakota, United States

See also: KVLY-TV mast, transmitter for the station and second highest man made structure in the world

- KVLY (FM), a radio station (107.9 FM) licensed to Edinburg, Texas, United States
