= La Feria High School =

Public school in Texas, United States

Location
- 901 North Canal Street; La Feria, Texas 78559; United States; 26.163530°N 97.829521°W

Information
- Type: Public high school
- School district: La Feria Independent School District
- Principal: Hector Cazares
- Faculty: 69.55 (FTE)
- Grades: 8-12
- Enrollment: 912 (2023-2024)
- Student to teacher ratio: 13.11
- Colors: Maroon and gold
- Athletics conference: Class 4A
- Team name: Lions
- Website: hs.laferiaisd.org

La Feria High School (LFHS) is a public high school located in La Feria, Texas, United States. It is the sole high school in the La Feria Independent School District. For the 2024-2025 school year, the school was given a "B" by the Texas Education Agency.

LFHS was said to have been racially integrated first in 1957, making the class of 1959 the first integrated class in the state of Texas to graduate.

== Athletics ==
The La Feria Lions compete in the following sports:

- Baseball
- Basketball
- Cross country
- Football
- Golf
- Powerlifting
- Soccer
- Softball
- Tennis
- Track and field
- Volleyball
