= KTJN =

KTJN may refer to:

- KTJN-LP, a low-power radio station (101.1 FM) licensed to Gold Beach, Oregon, United States
- KHKZ, a radio station (106.3 FM) licensed to San Benito, Texas, United States, which held the call sign KTJN from 1992 to 2003
