= KNVO =

KNVO may refer to:

- KNVO (TV), a television station (channel 17, virtual 48) licensed to McAllen, Texas
- KNVO-FM, a radio station (101.1 FM) licensed to Port Isabel, Texas
