= KBMI =

KBMI could refer to:

- KJPZ, a radio station (104.1 FM) licensed to serve East Helena, Montana, United States, which held the call sign KBMI-FM from 2013 to 2018
- KRIO-FM, a radio station (97.7 FM) licensed to serve Roma, Texas, United States, and assigned call sign KBMI from 1982 to 2011
- Central Illinois Regional Airport, ICAO code KBMI, an airport serving Bloomington-Normal, Illinois, United States
