= KRIX =

Radio station in Port Isabel, Texas

- Port Isabel, Texas; United States
- Frequency: 105.5 MHz
- Branding: 105.5 Rocket

Programming
- Format: Classic rock

Ownership
- Owner: Eduardo S. Gallegos
- Sister stations: KSOY-LD

History
- First air date: April 2019; 7 years ago
- Former call signs: KLME (2019–2020)
- Call sign meaning: previously used in the market in the 1980s

Technical information
- Licensing authority: FCC
- Facility ID: 198768
- Class: A
- ERP: 1,200 watts
- HAAT: 107 meters (351 ft)
- Transmitter coordinates: 26°3′12″N 103°8′10.00″W

Links
- Public license information: Public file; LMS
- Webcast: Listen Live

KRIX (105.5 FM) is a radio station broadcasting a classic rock format in Port Isabel, Texas. The station is owned by Eduardo S. Gallegos. It's an affiliate of the syndicated Pink Floyd program "Floydian Slip."

== History ==
After obtaining a construction permit in 2016, KLME came to air in April 2019, filing for a license to cover. The station initially broadcast a Regional Mexican music format as "La Mexicana". The call letters were changed to KRIX on March 4, 2020; this call sign had previously been used at 99.5 FM throughout the 1980s.

On April 13, 2020, Gallegos relaunched KRIX as "105.5 Rocket", a classic rock outlet. It was the first classic rock station to launch on the same day in the market alongside a flip of KFRQ which is more mainstream, but later decided to follow the Classic Rock format.
