= KRME =

KRME may refer to:

- KRME-LP, a low-power radio station (98.9 FM) licensed to serve College Station, Texas, United States
- Griffiss International Airport (ICAO code KRME)
