= KXTO =

Radio station in Reno, Nevada

Reno, Nevada; United States
- Broadcast area: Reno
- Frequency: 1550 kHz
- Branding: Radio Vida

Programming
- Format: Spanish Christian

Ownership
- Owner: Christian Ministries of the Valley, Inc.
- Sister stations: KBIC, KRGE, KBPO

History
- First air date: 1984

Technical information
- Licensing authority: FCC
- Facility ID: 21530
- Class: D
- Power: 2,500 watts day 94 watts night
- Transmitter coordinates: 39°34′39.00″N 119°50′52.00″W

Links
- Public license information: Public file; LMS
- Website: http://radiovida.com

KXTO (1550 AM) is a radio station licensed to Reno, Nevada, United States, serving the Reno, Sparks and Carson City areas. The station is owned by Christian Ministries of the Valley, Inc. broadcasting a Spanish Christian format. KXTO was owned by First Broadcasting of Nevada, Inc., and aired a Spanish Pop format as "Exitos 1550", before being sold to Christian Ministries of the Valley, Inc. in Spring of 2012.

In January, 2013 KXTO was granted a construction permit by the U.S. Federal Communications Commission to move to a new transmitter site, decrease day power to 2,400 watts and decrease night power to 70 watts. This permit expired.

The frequency was previously occupied by KOBY, which was deleted in October 1983.
