= KESO =

Radio station in South Padre Island, Texas

- South Padre Island, Texas; United States
- Broadcast area: Rio Grande Valley
- Frequency: 92.7 MHz
- Branding: Radio Esperanza

Programming
- Format: Spanish Christian radio

Ownership
- Owner: Rio Grande Bible Institute, Inc. (Formerly owned by) MBM TEXAS VALLEY LLC, NOW MBM COMMUNICATIONS LLC
- Sister stations: KOIR, KRIO (AM), KRIO-FM

History
- First air date: 1989 (as KJIB)
- Former call signs: KOUA (1989–1989); KJIB (1989–1995)

Technical information
- Licensing authority: FCC
- Facility ID: 36650
- Class: C2
- ERP: 38,000 watts
- HAAT: 131 meters (461 ft)
- Transmitter coordinates: 26°3′14″N 97°12′47″W

Links
- Public license information: Public file; LMS

KESO (92.7 FM) is a radio station broadcasting a Spanish Christian radio format. Licensed to South Padre Island, Texas, United States, the station serves the McAllen-Brownsville-Harlingen area. The station is currently owned by the Rio Grande Bible Institute, Inc.

Previously known as "Alternative 92.7" and "Digital 92.7", the station recently simulcast the Regional Mexican programming of XHRR.

== History ==
The station was assigned the call sign KOUA on 1989-09-26. On 1989-10-12, the station changed its call sign to KJIB and again on 1995-12-18 to the current KESO.
