= Lower Rio Grande Valley Development Council =

Organization

- Logo

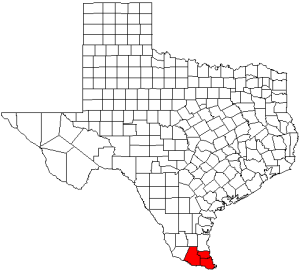
- Map of Texas highlighting counties served by the Lower Rio Grande Valley Development Council
- Formation: 1967
- Type: Voluntary association of governments
- Region served: 3,019 sq mi (7,820 km^{2})
- Members: 3 counties

Historical population
Year	Pop.	±%
2000	924,772	—
2010	1,203,123	+30.1%
2020	1,311,962	+9.0%

The Lower Rio Grande Valley Development Council (LRGVDC) is a voluntary association of cities, counties and special districts in the Rio Grande Valley region of southern Texas.

Based in Weslaco, the Lower Rio Grande Valley Development Council is a member of the Texas Association of Regional Councils.

LRGVDC operates regional transit services under the name Valley Metro.

== Counties served ==
- Cameron
- Hidalgo
- Willacy

== Largest cities in the region ==
- Brownsville
- McAllen
- Harlingen
- Edinburg
- Mission
- Pharr
- San Juan
- Weslaco
- San Benito
