= KRGE =

Radio station in Weslaco, Texas

Coordinates: 26°12′36″N 97°54′33″W

- Weslaco, Texas; United States
- Broadcast area: Rio Grande Valley
- Frequency: 1290 kHz C-QUAM AM Stereo
- Branding: Radio Vida

Programming
- Format: Spanish Religious

Ownership
- Owner: Christian Ministries of the Valley
- Sister stations: KBIC, KXTO, KBPO

History
- First air date: 1925
- Former call signs: KFLU (1925–27); KHMC (1927–28); KRGV (1928–87)
- Call sign meaning: Rio Grande

Technical information
- Licensing authority: FCC
- Facility ID: 11081
- Class: B
- Power: 5,000 watts

Links
- Public license information: Public file; LMS
- Website: www.radiovida.com

KRGE (1290 AM) is a radio station in Weslaco, Texas, United States. It is owned by Christian Ministries of the Valley and carries a Spanish Christian format known as Radio Vida.

== History ==
=== Early years and time-share with KWWG ===
KRGE is one of the Valley's oldest radio stations, receiving its license in 1925 with the callsign KFLU; the call letters were randomly assigned from a sequential roster of available call signs. The station was owned by the San Benito Radio Club and broadcast for its first two years on 1270 kHz with 15 watts, later raised to 100. Programs were broadcast on Wednesdays and Saturdays from 8 to 9pm. Two years later, the Harlingen Music Company took over the station and changed the callsign to KHMC and then KRGV, relocating the station from San Benito to Harlingen. A radio reallocation in 1928 forced KRGV to 1260 kHz, where it shared time with KWWG, the radio station of the Brownsville Herald and the first radio station in the Valley; additionally, KRGV increased its power to 500 watts.

The Harlingen Music Company sold KRGV to the Valley Radio-Electric Company in 1929. The license was transferred to a new concern controlled by N.S. Miles, KRGV, Incorporated, in 1930. Meanwhile, KWWG did not stick around. Violent storms hit south Texas in August 1933, leaving KRGV's time-share partner in the lower Valley out of commission. When the station applied for renewal of its license, it also sought to be sold to Port Arthur College, which planned to move the station 350 miles (560 km) to Port Arthur. The Federal Radio Commission approved the move, which also allowed KRGV to go full-time. Two petitioners, involved in the operation of KFDM radio in Beaumont, sought to deny the move of KWWG to Port Arthur, but were refused, and KWWG left the Valley for Port Arthur with a new callsign, KPAC; the station now operates on 1250 kHz as KDEI.

=== KRGV all alone ===
KWWG's relocation to Port Arthur left KRGV alone on 1260, broadcasting from its new site in Weslaco, and four years later, O.L. Taylor, Gene Howe and T.E. Snowden took over the license. NARBA reallocation resulted in KRGV being assigned a new frequency, 1290 kHz, in 1941. The station's power had also been raised to 1,000 watts in 1937.

In 1949, Taylor Radio and Television Corporation took over the station, and it was approved to increase power to 5,000 watts and mount an FM antenna on one of its towers. By this time, a conditional grant had been made for KRGV-FM, which was to broadcast on 93.7 MHz but never came to air. The KRGV family had a more successful expansion into television, as KRGV-TV signed on the air in 1954. KRGV cycled through several owners, including The LBJ Company, the company of Texas senator and future president Lyndon B. Johnson, which bought half of the station's stock in 1957, and Kenco Enterprises, which acquired the stations in 1961. In March 1964, the Manship family, which continues to own KRGV-TV, acquired the stations.

=== KRGE after 1987 ===
In 1987, KRGV became KRGE when Daytona Group of Texas, Inc. acquired the station. Daytona, which was controlled by Norman S. Drubner, also owned KRIX 99.5 FM. The addition of the FM station was a last-ditch effort to maintain KRGV/KRGE's long-running Top 40 format, which finally went by the wayside in 1988 with a format flip to oldies. Sunbelt Radio Group entered into a deal to acquire KRGE & KRIX in June 1990 and wasted no time selling off the AM station; KRGE was sold to Christian Ministries of the Valley in November 1990.

On March 1, 1991, at 6a.m., KRGE began broadcasting a Spanish Christian format under the Radio Vida name. It was the first station owned by Christian Ministries of the Valley, which now has other owned-and-operated and affiliated stations carrying the format, including sister station KBIC 105.7 FM in Raymondville and its dependent translator on 96.5 MHz in Weslaco.

Christian Ministries of the Valley has also carried the Radio Vida format on KERG (104.7 FM) in Escobares, Texas.
