= KKPS =

Radio station in Brownsville, Texas

- Brownsville, Texas; United States
- Broadcast area: Rio Grande Valley; Matamoros and Reynosa, Tamaulipas, Mexico.
- Frequency: 99.5 MHz
- Branding: Fuego 99.5

Programming
- Languages: Spanish; English
- Format: Bilingual Rhythmic CHR

Ownership
- Owner: Entravision Holdings, LLC
- Sister stations: KFRQ, KNVO-FM, KVLY

History
- First air date: January 1978; 48 years ago
- Former call signs: KRIX (1978–1991); KRGY (1991–1992); KVSE (1992)
- Call sign meaning: Que Pasa (former branding)

Technical information
- Licensing authority: FCC
- Facility ID: 56483
- Class: C
- ERP: 100,000 watts
- HAAT: 301 meters (988 ft)
- Transmitter coordinates: 26°4′53″N 97°49′44″W

Links
- Public license information: Public file; LMS
- Webcast: Listen Live
- Website: Fuego 99.5

KKPS (99.5 FM) "Fuego 99.5" is a radio station broadcasting a Bilingual Rhythmic CHR format. Licensed to Brownsville, Texas, United States, the station serves the McAllen-Brownsville-Harlingen area. The station is currently owned by Entravision Holdings, LLC. It shares a studio with its sister stations, KFRQ, KNVO-FM, and KVLY, located in McAllen, Texas, while its transmitter is located near Bluetown, Texas.

== History ==
KRIX signed on in January 1978. The station was initially co-owned with KRIO and aired a rock format under the name "99X" through the 1980s. KRIX was sold twice in the decade, to H&H Communications in 1982 and Norman Drubner's Daytona Group in 1986.

In February 1991, KRIX flipped to Rhythmic CHR as KRGY "Energy 99.5" under Sunbelt Media ownership. KRGY made an immediate dent in the ratings of established CHR station KBFM and boosted its own ratings from a 3.6 as KRIX in the summer of 1990 to 6.5 with the new format in 1991. Despite the improvement, KRGY relaunched again as KVSE "Sunny 99.5" on September 1, 1992.

However, the format and call letters would be short-lived. On December 28, 1992, upon the acquisition of KVSE by Spectrum Broadcasting of the Valley, the station relaunched as a Tejano-formatted station in Spanish known as Qué Pasa 99 ("What's Up 99") with new KKPS call letters.

In 2011, KKPS dropped most of the Tejano music content from the 1990s, thus becoming more of a Regional Mexican radio station than just a Tejano radio station. The format change gave the American side of the Rio Grande Valley area two Regional Mexican radio stations, with KKPS competing against KGBT-FM. Later in the year, the station rebranded as La Nueva 99.5 ("The New 99.5"). On January 8, 2018, another name change took place, this time to La Tricolor 99.5.

On March 30, 2020, Entravision dropped the La Tricolor format and branding for the Fuego format and branding found on sister stations KHHM in Sacramento, California and simulcaster KCVR-FM in Modesto, California, which broadcast a Bilingual Rhythmic CHR format. The change comes after the station received a 3.1 share in the Fall 2019 Nielsen Audio ratings, behind rival KGBT-FM, which received a 4.8 share."KKPS Brownsville TX 2/27/2026 Hits "Fuego"".
