= Larry Warner =

American lawyer and politician (1945–2022)

Larry Logan Warner (April 12, 1945 – February 1, 2022) was an American lawyer and politician.

Warner was born in Washington, D.C. He graduated from University of Texas and was admitted to the Texas bar. He lived in Harlingen, Texas with his wife and family. Warner served in the Texas House of Representatives from 1987 to 1991 and was a Democrat. He died on February 1, 2022, at the age of 76.
