= KOIR =

Radio station in Edinburg, Texas

- Edinburg, Texas; United States
- Broadcast area: Rio Grande Valley
- Frequency: 88.5 MHz
- Branding: Radio Esperanza

Programming
- Language: Spanish
- Format: Christian radio

Ownership
- Owner: Rio Grande Bible Institute, Inc.
- Sister stations: KRIO, KRIO-FM, KESO

History
- Call sign meaning: Rio Grande Valley

Technical information
- Licensing authority: FCC
- Facility ID: 56478
- Class: A
- ERP: 3,000 watts
- HAAT: 87 meters (285 ft)
- Transmitter coordinates: 26°07′46″N 98°10′56″W

Links
- Public license information: Public file; LMS
- Webcast: Listen live
- Website: radioesperanza.com

KOIR is a Spanish language Christian radio station licensed to Edinburg, Texas, United States, broadcasting on 88.5 FM. KOIR serves the areas of McAllen, Texas, United States, and Reynosa, Tamaulipas in Mexico.

KOIR's programming is also heard on KRIO in McAllen, Texas, KRIO-FM in Roma, Texas, and KESO in South Padre Island, Texas. KOIR is owned by Rio Grande Bible Institute, Inc.
