= KBTQ =

Radio station in Harlingen, Texas

- Harlingen, Texas; United States
- Broadcast area: Rio Grande Valley
- Frequency: 96.1 MHz (HD Radio)
- Branding: 96.1 La Exitosa

Programming
- Format: Spanish classic hits

Ownership
- Owner: Latino Media Network; (Latino Media Network, LLC)
- Sister stations: KGBT-FM; KYWW

History
- First air date: 1975
- Former call signs: KMBS (1975–77); KIWW (1977–2002)
- Call sign meaning: The Beat (former branding)

Technical information
- Facility ID: 67072
- Class: C
- ERP: 100,000 watts
- HAAT: 301 m (988 ft)
- Transmitter coordinates: 26°8′56″N 97°49′18″W

Links
- Webcast: Listen live (via iHeartRadio)

KBTQ (96.1 FM) is a radio station broadcasting a Spanish classic hits format. Licensed to Harlingen, Texas, United States, the station serves the McAllen area. The station is owned by Latino Media Network.

== History ==
KMBS "Stereo 96" signed on the air in June 1975. The English-language adult contemporary station was owned by Magic Valley Broadcasting, Inc. Two years later, in July 1977, Pedro "Pete" Díaz, Jr., bought out all of Magic Valley's stockholders. In early 1977, KMBS became a Spanish contemporary radio station; On July 20, the station received new KIWW call letters. Tichenor acquired KIWW in 1988.

=== Rhythmic Top 40 era (2002–2005) ===
KIWW carried a Tejano format until 2002, when it flipped to Rhythmic Top 40 as KBTQ. As this flipped occurred, the call letters "KIWW" remained in radio jingles and sweepers for a brief amount of time until the switch to the call letters of KBTQ."Broadcast Battlefield page. 8". The station continued this format uninterrupted until 2002, when it transitioned to a Rhythmic Top 40 format and adopted the KBTQ callsign On September 25, 2002, the station previously broadcasting under the call letters KIWW with a Tejano format underwent a major overhaul, adopting the KBTQ call sign and flipping to a Rhythmic Top 40 format branded as "96.1 The Beat." This change represented an experimental shift to English-language rhythmic contemporary music in the Harlingen-McAllen market, departing from the station's long-standing Spanish-language roots. During the initial transition, some production elements from the prior Tejano era, including familiar jingles, persisted in the programming to ease the shift for listeners. Following the merger of Univision with Hispanic Broadcasting Corporation in September 2003—valued at approximately $3.1 billion—the station, now operating as KBTQ with a Rhythmic Top 40 format branded as "96.1 The Beat," fell fully under Univision Radio's control. "96.1 KBTQ/Harlingen, TX". During the time of KBTQ 96.1 The Beat, shows that were broadcast included: "The Slammin' 7 at 7:47 (PM)," "Heartbeats on Sundays," "Morning Show with Alex Q. and Nicki," "Back in the Day with Kitty," "Sexy 7 at 7 (PM)," "Bobby's Playhouse with Chatito." During the 2002–2005 period, KBTQ's Rhythmic format targeted younger audiences with English-language urban and contemporary hits, but faced intense competition in the McAllen market. Univision Radio maintained the format amid a local "Rhythmic war" with rival station KBFM, leveraging cross-promotions across its cluster to support operations. Two years into this format, KBTQ gained formidable competition when KBFM switched from Mainstream Top 40 to Rhythmic Top 40, sparking a Rhythmic war in the Valley.The format's momentum was disrupted in early 2004 when competitor KBFM (104.1 FM), owned by Clear Channel Communications, abandoned its Mainstream Top 40 approach for a Rhythmic-leaning CHR format rebranded as "Wild 104, The Valley's Party Station." This aggressive repositioning ignited a fierce "Rhythmic war" in the market, with KBFM directly challenging KBTQ's dominance in the rhythmic space As part of the launch, KBFM poached prominent talent from KBTQ, including program director Johnny O and music director Bobby Macias, who took over leadership roles; they were joined by on-air personalities Foxy Roxy and Frankie G to host the new "Mojo Morning Show," further eroding KBTQ's team During the rhythmic top 40 era from 2002 to 2005, KBTQ operated as "96.1 The Beat" in the McAllen-Brownsville-Harlingen market, with Alix Quintero serving as program director, guiding the station's programming and music selection for its rhythmic contemporary hit radio format.

=== Loss of Revenue 2005 ===
As the Rhythmic War continued with rival KBFM, 96.1 The Beat KBTQ failed to capitalize on advertisement of commercial revenue due to various businesses' preference for a cleaner-sounding KBFM rather than an intense urban leaning station from KBTQ. Former personalities of KBTQ switched over to rival KBFM by this time and it was apparent that revenue was not improving thus forcing Univision Radio to pay out its personalities through sister station advertising commercial revenues. Although the listener ratings were strong and in favor of KBTQ against rival KBFM, the incoming revenue (or lack thereof) said otherwise. Univision came to the terms that without business advertising commercials, there is no way to maintain a station with its format. The intensified rivalry exacerbated competitive pressures on KBTQ, as the urban-oriented content of the Rhythmic format drew advertiser hesitation amid the fragmented market. Under ownership by Univision Radio (following its 2003 acquisition of Hispanic Broadcasting Corporation), the station relied on cross-subsidization from sister properties to sustain operations amid declining revenues. These challenges set the stage for the format's abandonment later that year.

=== Format Change 2005 ===
Previous logo

On October 17, 2005, KBTQ bowed out and switched to its current format to appeal to a wide range of businesses for commercial advertisement.

Latino Media Network purchased KBTQ from TelevisaUnivision in 2022 as part of a larger $60 million deal. Under a local marketing agreement, it continued to be programmed by TelevisaUnivision's Uforia Audio Network until the spring of 2023.

On March 8, 2024, KBTQ went off the air shortly after 10 am, as a result of the KGBT-TV tower in La Feria, Texas, which KBTQ transmits from, being brought down after two of its 24 guy wires snapped. The station temporarily broadcast on KGBT-FM's HD2 subchannel, while its main frequency was off the air. KFRQ (owned by Entravision Communications) was also affected. KBTQ went back on the air on March 28, 2024.
