= KVNS =

Radio station in Brownsville, Texas

- Brownsville, Texas; United States
- Broadcast area: Lower Rio Grande Valley
- Frequency: 1700 kHz
- Branding: Fox Sports Radio 1700

Programming
- Language: English
- Format: Sports radio
- Network: Fox Sports Radio

Ownership
- Owner: iHeartMedia; (iHM Licenses, LLC)
- Sister stations: KHKZ; KQXX-FM; KTEX; KBFM

History
- First air date: March 6, 1998
- Former call signs: KQXX (1998–2004)

Technical information
- Licensing authority: FCC
- Facility ID: 87142
- Class: B
- Power: 8,800 watts (day); 880 watts (night)
- Transmitter coordinates: 25°56′58.3″N 97°33′16″W

Links
- Public license information: Public file; LMS
- Webcast: Listen live (via iHeartRadio)
- Website: foxsports1700.iheart.com

KVNS (1700 kHz) is a commercial AM radio station broadcasting a sports radio format. Licensed to Brownsville, Texas, United States, the station is currently owned by iHeartMedia and features programming from Fox Sports Radio. It shares studios with its sister stations, KHKZ, KQXX-FM, KTEX, and KBFM, located close to the KRGV-TV studios in Weslaco, Texas, while its transmitter is located 5 miles northwest of Brownsville, Texas.

== History ==
KVNS originated as the expanded band "twin" of an existing station on the standard AM band.

In 1949, a license was issued for a new Brownsville radio station, KBOR on 1600 kHz, owned by Brownsville Broadcasting Company. On March 17, 1997, the Federal Communications Commission (FCC) announced that 88 stations had been given permission to move to newly available "Expanded Band" transmitting frequencies, ranging from 1610 to 1700 kHz, with KBOR authorized to move from 1600 kHz to 1700 kHz. A construction permit for the expanded band station was assigned the call letters KQXX on March 6, 1998.

On February 26, 2004, 1700 AM changed its call sign to KVNS, and the KQXX call letters were transferred to the former KBOR on 1600 AM. On February 3, 2004, KVNS was sold to Clear Channel Broadcasting Licenses, and on February 17, 2009, the station was sold to Clear Channel Broadcasting Licenses.

The FCC's initial policy was that both the original station and its expanded band counterpart could operate simultaneously for up to 5 years, after which owners would have to turn in one of the two licenses, depending on whether they preferred the new assignment or elected to remain on the original frequency, although this deadline was extended multiple times. It was ultimately decided to transfer full operations to the expanded band station, and on February 17, 2005, the license for original station on 1600 AM, KQXX, was cancelled.

On September 17, 2012, KVNS 1700 AM changed formats from classic hits to sports, with programming from Fox Sports Radio.

== Previous logo ==
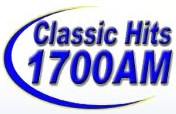
