= Rio Grande Bible College =

Christian bible college in Texas, US

Coordinates: 26.259599°N 98.172658°W

- Established: 1947
- Founder: M.C. Ehlert
- Religious affiliation: Non-denominational Christian
- Location: Edinburg, Texas, United States
- Website: www.riogrande.edu/en/content/bible-college

The Rio Grande Bible College (RGBI) is a Christian bible college in Edinburg, Texas. It is associated with the Rio Grande Bible Ministries. The college serves as a bible college for students from Mexico, Central America, and South America and it also provides Spanish language training for non-Spanish-speaking North Americans who will serve as missionaries in Spanish-speaking areas of the world.

== History ==
The Rio Grande Bible Institute was founded in 1946 by M.C. Ehlert, a Danish evangelist who pastored churches in Minnesota and Iowa before moving to the Rio Grande Valley in 1937, to minister to the Hispanic population there.

In January 1947, Mr. Ehlert, with friends and his wife, Elizabeth, began the first classes at night so that local Hispanics could attend while working during the day. Classes were taught in both English and Spanish for the first few years, but in 1955 the English school was terminated in favor of a Spanish language school for missionaries heading to Latin America.
