= KSOX =

Radio station in Raymondville, Texas

Coordinates: 26°24′19″N 97°54′52″W

- Raymondville, Texas; United States
- Broadcast area: Rio Grande Valley
- Frequency: 1240 (kHz)
- Branding: Visión Hispana

Programming
- Language: Spanish
- Format: Religious

Ownership
- Owner: Visión Hispana Incorporated Internacional

History
- First air date: June 25, 1957 July 19, 2026
- Call sign meaning: SOuth TeXas

Technical information
- Licensing authority: FCC
- Facility ID: 18653
- Class: C
- Power: 520 watts day 850 watts night
- Translator: La Joya: 98.9 (K255DB)

Links
- Public license information: Public file; LMS

KSOX (1240 AM, "Visión Hispana") is a Spanish-language religious radio station in Raymondville, Texas.

== History ==
KSOX received its license in 1957, reviving a set of calls once used on 1530 AM until it became KGBS in 1953.

KSOX for much of the 1990s and 2000s was an ESPN Radio affiliate, later switching to Fox Sports Radio. In 2010, KSOX was sold to Visión Hispana; it simulcast Fox Sports Radio with KVJY until the sale was finalized, at which time KSOX changed formats to Spanish-language religion.
