= KNVO-FM =

Radio station in Port Isabel, Texas

- Port Isabel, Texas; United States
- Broadcast area: Rio Grande Valley; Matamoros and Reynosa, Tamaulipas, Mexico.
- Frequency: 101.1 MHz
- Branding: La Suavecita 101.1

Programming
- Format: Spanish adult hits

Ownership
- Owner: Entravision Communications; (Entravision Holdings, LLC)
- Sister stations: KFRQ, KKPS, KVLY

History
- First air date: April 1, 1993; 32 years ago
- Former call signs: KVPA (1989–2003); KNVO-FM (2003–2007); KZPL (2007)
- Call sign meaning: "Nuevo"

Technical information
- Licensing authority: FCC
- Facility ID: 40680
- Class: C2
- ERP: 50,000 watts
- HAAT: 148 meters (486 ft)
- Transmitter coordinates: 26°19′30″N 97°25′25″W

Links
- Public license information: Public file; LMS
- Webcast: Listen Live
- Website: KNVO-FM on Facebook

KNVO-FM (101.1 FM, "La Suavecita 101.1") is a radio station licensed to serve Port Isabel, Texas, United States. The station is owned by Entravision Communications. KNVO-FM broadcasts a Spanish adult hits music format to the Rio Grande Valley area. The Entravision studios are located in McAllen, with the transmitter near Rio Hondo.

== History ==
After being approved in 1989, KVPA began broadcasting April 1, 1993, from studios on South Padre Island and airing a classic rock format. It was built by Charlie Trub, who had previously built up KRIO and KRIX.

The station was sold to Sunburst Media and then, along with three other outlets, to Entravision in a $55 million acquisition in 2000. In 2003, KVPA's rhythmic contemporary hit radio format became KNVO-FM with a Spanish-language adult contemporary format under the brand Oye.

The station was assigned the KNVO-FM call sign for the second time by the Federal Communications Commission on October 2, 2007.

The station was known as José 101.1 until early 2018, when the station renamed itself as La Suavecita 101.1.
