= KGBT-FM =

Radio station in McAllen, Texas

- McAllen, Texas; United States
- Broadcast area: Rio Grande Valley
- Frequency: 98.5 MHz
- Branding: KGBT 98.5 La Preferida

Programming
- Format: Regional Mexican

Ownership
- Owner: Latino Media Network; (Latino Media Network, LLC)
- Sister stations: KBTQ; KYWW

History
- First air date: October 4, 1966
- Former call signs: KQXX (1966–1997)

Technical information
- Licensing authority: FCC
- Facility ID: 6662
- Class: C
- ERP: 100,000 watts
- HAAT: 304 meters (997 ft)
- Transmitter coordinates: 26.1492°N 97.8219°W

Links
- Public license information: Public file; LMS
- Webcast: Listen live (via iHeartRadio)

KGBT-FM (98.5 MHz) is an American radio station in McAllen, Texas, United States, owned by Latino Media Network, which offers a regional Mexican music format The station has had a regional Mexican format since 1997. Its studios are located in McAllen, Texas, while its transmitter is located in La Feria, Texas.

== History ==
The 98.5 frequency went on the air October 4, 1966, as the Rio Broadcasting Company's KQXX (though the permit was known as KABG-FM before going on the air). KQXX maintained studios in the Casa de Palmas Hotel in McAllen. One of the founders was Ed Gomez, a local radio and TV personality who went on to be elected a Hidalgo County judge. The station changed formats from country to Spanish.

In 1980, Bravo Broadcasting bought KQXX and increased its power to the present 100,000 watts. A new Rio Broadcasting Company acquired the station in 1990. Tichenor acquired the station in 1996 and rechristened it as KGBT-FM on January 20, 1997.

Previous logo

Latino Media Network purchased KGBT-FM from TelevisaUnivision in 2022 as part of a larger $60 million deal. Under a local marketing agreement, it continued to be programmed by TelevisaUnivision's Uforia Audio Network until the spring of 2023.
