= KRIO-FM =

- Roma, Texas; United States
- Broadcast area: Rio Grande Valley
- Frequency: 97.7 MHz
- Branding: Radio Esperanza

Programming
- Language: Spanish
- Format: Christian

Ownership
- Owner: Rio Grande Bible Institute, Inc.
- Sister stations: KRIO (AM), KOIR, KESO

History
- First air date: 1983
- Former call signs: KBMI (1982–2011)
- Call sign meaning: RIO Grande Valley

Technical information
- Licensing authority: FCC
- Facility ID: 24816
- Class: A
- ERP: 3,000 watts
- HAAT: 91 meters (299 ft)
- Transmitter coordinates: 26°24′22″N 99°00′37″W

Links
- Public license information: Public file; LMS
- Website: radioesperanza.com

KRIO-FM (97.7 FM) is a non-commercial educational radio station licensed to serve Roma, Texas, United States. The station, established in 1983, is currently owned by Rio Grande Bible Institute, Inc.

== Programming ==
KRIO-FM broadcasts a Spanish-language Christian radio format. KRIO-FM and sister station KRIO AM 910 simulcast the programming of KOIR (88.5 FM) in nearby Edinburg, Texas.

== History ==
This station received its original construction permit from the Federal Communications Commission on February 25, 1982. The new station was assigned the KBMI call sign by the FCC on June 14, 1982. KBMI received its license to cover from the FCC on January 30, 1985.

In November 1996, Grant Communications Group, Inc., applied to the FCC to transfer the license for this station to Timon Auto & Equipment Leasing Corp. The deal was approved by the FCC on December 24, 1996, and the transaction was consummated on February 20, 1997.

In September 1998, Timon Auto & Equipment Leasing Corp. reached an agreement to sell this station to Horizon Broadcasting, Inc. The deal was approved by the FCC on October 26, 1998, and the transaction was consummated on November 10, 1998. Facing technical and financial difficulties, KBMI went dark on August 1, 2004.

In November 2004, Horizon Broadcasting, Inc., reached an agreement to sell this station to Border Media Partners LLC, through their wholly owned BMP RGV License Company, LP, subsidiary. The deal was approved by the FCC on March 14, 2005, and the transaction was consummated on March 31, 2005. KBMI was returned to regular broadcast operations at approximately 1:00 p.m. on July 15, 2005.

In January 2008, Border Media Partners LLC, through their BMP RGV License Company, LP, subsidiary, reached an agreement to sell this station to Rio Grande Bible Institute, Inc. The deal was approved by the FCC on March 12, 2008, and the transaction was consummated on April 9, 2008. In September 2008, the FCC approved the Rio Grande Bible Institute's application to flip KBMI from a commercial station to a non-commercial educational license, operated and programmed remotely under a main studio waiver.

On March 10, 2011, KBMI changed their call letters to KRIO-FM.
