= KBIC =

- Raymondville, Texas; United States
- Broadcast area: Rio Grande Valley
- Frequency: 105.7 (MHz)
- Branding: Radio Vida

Programming
- Format: Spanish Religious

Ownership
- Owner: Christian Ministries of the Valley
- Sister stations: KRGE, KBPO, KXTO

History
- First air date: 1997
- Former call signs: KQUF (1991); KARU (1991–1995)

Technical information
- Licensing authority: FCC
- Facility ID: 11082
- Class: A
- ERP: 1,800 watts
- HAAT: 130 meters (430 ft)
- Transmitter coordinates: 26°26′37″N 97°42′8″W
- Translator: (96.5 MHz) K243BI (Weslaco)

Links
- Public license information: Public file; LMS
- Webcast: Listen live
- Website: Official website

KBIC (105.7 FM, "Radio Vida") is a radio station broadcasting a Spanish Religious format. Licensed to Raymondville, Texas, United States, the station serves the McAllen-Brownsville-Harlingen area. The station is currently owned by Christian Ministries of the Valley.

== History ==
The Federal Communications Commission issued a construction permit for the station on March 5, 1991. The station was assigned the call sign KQUF on May 3, 1991. On October 7, 1991, the station changed its call sign to KARU, and on June 1, 1995, to the current KBIC. The station was granted its license to cover on December 31, 1997.

== Translators ==
In addition to the main station, KBIC is relayed by an additional translator to widen its broadcast area.

Call sign	Frequency	City of license	FID	ERP (W)	Class	FCC info
K243BI	96.5 FM	Weslaco, Texas	139765	250	D	LMS
