= XHNA-FM =

Radio station in Matamoros, Tamaulipas, Mexico

- Matamoros, Tamaulipas; Mexico
- Broadcast area: Brownsville–Matamoros
- Frequency: 105.9 MHz
- Branding: Mega 105.9

Programming
- Format: Regional Mexican

Ownership
- Owner: Radiorama; (XHNA-FM, S.A. de C.V.)
- Operator: Grupo Radio Avanzado (through Radio Avanzado Networks)
- Sister stations: XHMLS-FM, XERDO-AM

History
- First air date: November 28, 1988 (concession)

Technical information
- Licensing authority: CRT
- Class: AA
- ERP: 4,950 watts
- HAAT: 55.13 m (180.9 ft)

Links
- Website: radioavanzado.com

XHNA-FM (105.9 MHz) is a radio station in Matamoros, Tamaulipas, Mexico.

== History ==
XHNA received its concession on November 28, 1988. It was owned by Radiorama subsidiary Radiofonía Mexicana, S.A. Radiorama transferred the station to a new concessionaire in 2008.
