= KYWW =

Radio station in Harlingen, Texas

Coordinates: 26°22′34.3″N 97°53′44″W

- Harlingen, Texas; United States
- Broadcast area: Rio Grande Valley
- Frequency: 1530 kHz
- Branding: Puro Tejano 1530 AM

Programming
- Language: Spanish
- Format: Tejano music
- Affiliations: TUDN Radio

Ownership
- Owner: Latino Media Network; (Latino Media Network, LLC)
- Sister stations: KBTQ; KGBT-FM

History
- First air date: August 20, 1941; 84 years ago (as KGBS on 1240 kHz); December 1, 1951 (as KSOX on 1530 kHz); September 1, 1953 (as KGBS on 1530 kHz)
- Former call signs: KCUE (CP); KSOX (1951–1953); KGBS (October 7–December 31, 1953); KGBT (1954–2025)
- Former frequencies: 1240 kHz (1941–1953)

Technical information
- Licensing authority: FCC
- Facility ID: 67067
- Class: B
- Power: 50,000 watts day and critical hours; 10,000 watts night

Links
- Public license information: Public file; LMS

KYWW (1530 kHz, "Puro Tejano 1530 AM") is a Spanish language AM radio station, licensed to Harlingen, Texas, United States, and serving the Rio Grande Valley border area. It is owned by Latino Media Network, and airs a Spanish language Tejano music format.

By day, KYWW is powered at 50,000 watts non-directional, the maximum for American commercial AM radio stations. Because 1530 AM is a clear channel frequency reserved for KFBK in Sacramento and WCKY in Cincinnati, KYWW reduces power at night to 10,000 watts to avoid interference. After sunset and during critical hours, it uses a directional antenna with a six-tower array. The transmitter is on Route 491 in Stockholm, Texas.

== History ==
=== Early years of KGBS and KSOX ===
In 1941, McHenry Tichenor, former publisher of the Valley Morning Star newspaper, broke ground on a new radio station at a site known as Harbenito, between Harlingen and San Benito. The "Harbenito station", KGBS on 1240 kHz, signed on the air at dawn on August 20, 1941. It was the third radio station in the Valley. The station obtained a CBS radio affiliation in 1943, just two years after signing on.

Meanwhile, after several years of protests from the 1530 AM station in Cincinnati, the FCC approved the application of Roy Hofheinz to build a new station in Harlingen. The city would become the smallest in the country to host a 50,000-watt radio station, which finally went on air on December 1, 1951. KSOX was a Mutual Broadcasting System affiliate. Three thousand residents attended the station's open house to see a modern studio facility, a scaled-down version of his KTHT in Houston.

=== KGBS moves to 1530 and becomes KGBT ===
Two years later, effective September 1, 1953, KGBS bought the KSOX facilities and moved its programming and call sign there, including its CBS affiliation. (The 1240 license was surrendered; the frequency was revived in 1957 using the KSOX call sign.) The Harbenito facilities were converted to television station KGBS-TV, which launched on October 4. On New Year's Day 1954, KGBS became KGBT, matching the TV station, which changed its call letters on December 9, 1953. The Tichenor group in the Valley was completed with KELT FM 96.9.

Into the 1960s, KGBT became a highly successful station in the market, particularly once it flipped to Spanish-language programming. In 1967, it commanded more than a 60 percent share of local radio listening just on the United States side of the border. In 1991, it still rated third in the market despite being on AM.

=== Univision ownership ===
The Tichenor family's media holdings, later renamed the Hispanic Broadcasting Corporation, were acquired by Univision Communications in 2003 in a $3 billion merger, ending 62 years of Tichenor ownership of KGBS/KGBT.

KGBT was affiliated with the Univision America network from 2012 until its demise in mid-2015, when KGBT and several other former Univision America stations changed to a Spanish Christian format known as "Amor Celestial".

On December 20, 2016, Univision announced that KGBT would be one of the charter affiliates of their new Spanish-language sports network, Univision Deportes Radio; the launch occurred in March 2017. The network became known as TUDN Radio in 2019.

=== Latino Media Network sale ===
On June 3, 2022, Univision announced it would sell a package of 18 radio stations across 10 of its markets, primarily AM outlets in large cities (including KGBT) and entire clusters in smaller markets such as McAllen, Texas, Fresno, California, and Las Vegas, Nevada. The price tag was $60 million, and the owner would be a new company known as Latino Media Network (LMN). Univision proposed to handle operations for a year under agreement before turning over operational control to LMN in the fourth quarter of 2023. The sale was consummated on December 30, 2022. In the spring of 2023, TelevisaUnivision turned over operational control to Latino Media Network for the three stations (including KGBT), making the McAllen market the first market in which LMN took full operational control.

On March 11, 2025, Latino Media Network changed KGBT's call sign to KYWW.
