= KBPO =

- Port Neches, Texas; United States
- Broadcast area: The Golden Triangle
- Frequency: 1150 kHz
- Branding: Radio Vida

Programming
- Language: Spanish
- Format: Christian
- Affiliations: Radio Vida

Ownership
- Owner: Christian Ministries of the Valley, Inc.
- Sister stations: KBIC, KRGE

History
- Former call signs: KPNG; KSUZ (-1978); KDLF (1978–1993); KUHD (1993–2007)
- Call sign meaning: Beaumont Pt. Arthur Orange (the 3 cities which make up the "Golden Triangle")

Technical information
- Licensing authority: FCC
- Facility ID: 68762
- Class: D
- Power: 500 watts day 63 watts night
- Transmitter coordinates: 30°4′45″N 93°57′5″W

Links
- Public license information: Public file; LMS
- Webcast: http://radiovida1150.com
- Website: http://www.radiovida1150.com

KBPO (1150 AM) is a radio station that is licensed to Port Neches, Texas, United States. The station is on the air broadcasting Spanish Christian format and to serves the Beaumont-Port Arthur area. The station is currently owned by Christian Ministries of the Valley, Inc.

== History ==
The station was originally licensed as KPNG, which stands for Port Neches-Groves; Port Neches is the community of license or COL. Groves is the neighbor city which shares the school district - Port Neches-Groves ISD. PNG is the abbreviation of the name and during the 1970s, PNG was a powerhouse high school football team, winning the Texas Class 4A (the largest) championship at Texas Stadium in Irving in December 1975. Its original format was Country and Western (as it was called then). Later, under owner Les Ledet, the callsign was changed to KSUZ, after Les's daughter Suzanne and the format was a MOR (Middle of the Road). The station was later purchased by radio preacher Billy James Hargis. It was assigned the call letters KDLF on 1978-07-01. These call letters stood for the David Livingstone Foundation. On 1993-09-17, the station changed its call sign to KUHD, and on 2007-03-15 to the current KBPO.

KBPO had been assigned to local 94.1 FM back in the early 1970s (formerly KLVI-FM). The callsign meant several things; the actual point of BPO standing for Beaumont-Port Arthur-Orange, but also had to joking meanings to those in local broadcasting. One was "Keeps Berry Pissed Off" in reference to local FCC engineer Barry Nadler, who "had it in" for the John Hicks family who owned KLVI AM and FM. Tom Hicks, one of the sons of John Hicks, later was CEO of AM-FM broadcasting and is still owner of the Dallas Stars. The other was in reference to then KLVI/KBPO Chief Engineer Keesler; "Keesler's Big Put On".

Currently the station is carrying Fox Radio News and shows like Hannity but its stream is still playing Hispanic Religious music.
