= KQXX-FM =

Radio station in Mission, Texas

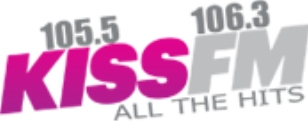
- Mission, Texas; United States
- Broadcast area: Rio Grande Valley
- Frequency: 105.5 MHz (HD Radio)
- Branding: Kiss FM 105.5 & 106.3

Programming
- Format: Hot Adult Contemporary (simulcast of KHKZ)

Ownership
- Owner: iHeartMedia; (iHM Licenses, LLC)
- Sister stations: KHKZ, KBFM, KTEX, KVNS

History
- First air date: 1986 (as KITM)
- Former call signs: KITM (1986–1991); KVTY (1991-1993); KTJX (1993-2000); KBOR-FM (2000-2003)

Technical information
- Licensing authority: FCC
- Facility ID: 36168
- Class: A
- ERP: 5,700 watts
- HAAT: 54 meters (177 ft)
- Transmitter coordinates: 26°13′50.00″N 98°20′18.00″W
- Repeater: KHKZ 106.3 MHz (San Benito)

Links
- Public license information: Public file; LMS
- Webcast: Listen Live
- Website: kissfmrgv.iheart.com

KQXX-FM (105.5 FM, "Kiss FM 105.5 & 106.3") is a radio station broadcasting a Hot Adult Contemporary music format, simulcasting its sister station KHKZ. Licensed to Mission, Texas, United States, the station serves the McAllen area. The station is currently owned by iHeartMedia. It shares a studio with its sister stations, KHKZ, KBFM, KTEX, and KVNS, located close to the KRGV-TV studios in Weslaco, Texas, while its transmitter is located about 1 mile northwest of Mission, Texas.

== History ==
On January 3, 1983, the FCC granted a construction permit to Mission Broadcast Enterprises, owned by Lino Canales and Gustavo Valadez, Jr., for a new radio station in Mission, KITM. Before going to air, the construction permit was sold to KITM, Inc. in April 1984. By January 1986, the station was on the air as "Star 105".

KITM was sold to RGV Broadcasting, Inc. in 1991; on March 25, the new owners relaunched KITM as KVTY "Victory 105" with a contemporary Christian format. By January 1992, however, KVTY had shifted formats to easy listening, complemented by a slate of local high school and college sports broadcasts.

Another station sale in 1993 united KVTY with KBOR (1600 AM). On May 21, 1993, the station became KTJX, broadcasting Tejano music. KBOR paired KTJX with KTJN in the Lower Valley. In 2000, the 105.5-106.3 simulcast was dropped, and KTJX became KBOR-FM.

Clear Channel, the predecessor to iHeartMedia, acquired the KBOR stations in 2003, just after 105.5 became KQXX-FM "Oldies 105.5". In 2009, KQXX-FM flipped to classic rock as "105.5 The X". On November 27, 2015, the station dropped the classic rock format and began stunting an all-Christmas music format. The Christmas music stunt format ended on December 25, 2015 at 6 PM, when KQXX-FM became a simulcast of KHKZ for the first time since 2000 and rebranded as Kiss FM 105.5 & 106.3, in order to cover the entire Rio Grande Valley (as KHKZ alone does not provide adequate coverage alone of the Upper Valley). KQXX-FM was still listed in the Classic Rock panel via Mediabase until January 8, 2016, when it was officially moved to the CHR panel. As of June 2016, the station was no longer listed on Mediabase.
