= XHMLS-FM =

Radio station in Matamoros, Tamaulipas

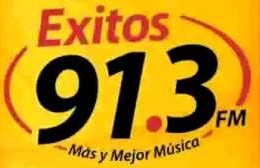
- Matamoros, Tamaulipas; Mexico
- Broadcast area: Brownsville–Matamoros; McAllen–Reynosa
- Frequency: 91.3 MHz
- Branding: Éxitos 91.3

Programming
- Format: Spanish-language contemporary hit radio

Ownership
- Owner: Grupo Radio Avanzado; (Radiodifusoras GAL de Matamoros, S.A. de C.V.)
- Sister stations: XERDO-AM, XHNA-FM

History
- First air date: August 11, 1960 (concession)
- Former frequencies: 98.1 MHz (1960–1986), 101.5 MHz (1986–1992)
- Call sign meaning: Original concessionaire Manuel L. Salinas

Technical information
- Licensing authority: CRT
- Class: C1
- ERP: 100,000 watts
- HAAT: 97.2 m (319 ft)

Links
- Webcast: Listen live
- Website: exitos913.com

XHMLS-FM (91.3 MHz) is a radio station in Matamoros, Tamaulipas, Mexico. It is owned by Grupo Radio Avanzado and known as Éxitos 91.3 with a pop format.

== History ==
XHMLS-FM is among the oldest FM stations in northeast Mexico. It received its concession on August 11, 1960, and was owned by Manuel L. Salinas. The original operating frequency was 98.1 MHz, with 1,000 watts ERP. Salinas died later in the 1960s, and his successors received control of the station in 1967.

In 1986, XHMLS was sold to Radiodifusoras Unidas Mexicanas de Matamoros. It also had found itself a new frequency, 101.5 MHz, operating at 3.348 kW ERP.

In 1992, XHMLS moved to 91.3 MHz. The station was sold to its current concessionaire in 2003.
