= KTEX =

Country Radio station in Mercedes, Texas

- Mercedes, Texas; United States
- Broadcast area: Rio Grande Valley
- Frequency: 100.3 MHz (HD Radio)
- Branding: FM 100 KTEX

Programming
- Format: Country
- Subchannels: HD2: Texas Red Dirt Radio
- Affiliations: Premiere Networks; Westwood One

Ownership
- Owner: iHeartMedia; (iHM Licenses, LLC)
- Sister stations: KBFM; KQXX-FM; KHKZ; KVNS

History
- First air date: 1975; 51 years ago
- Former call signs: KDUV-FM (1975–1983); KTXF (1983–1990)
- Call sign meaning: Texas

Technical information
- Licensing authority: FCC
- Facility ID: 64631
- Class: C0
- ERP: 100,000 watts
- HAAT: 373 meters (1,224 ft)
- Transmitter coordinates: 26°6′2.3″N 97°50′22″W

Links
- Public license information: Public file; LMS
- Webcast: Listen live (via iHeartRadio); HD2: Listen live (via iHeartRadio)
- Website: ktex.iheart.com

KTEX (100.3 FM) is a radio station broadcasting a country music format. Licensed to Mercedes, Texas, United States, the station serves the McAllen, Weslaco, Harlingen, Brownsville, Texas, area. The station is owned by iHeartMedia. It shares a studio with its sister stations KBFM, KQXX-FM, KHKZ, and KVNS, located close to the KRGV-TV studios in Weslaco, Texas, while its transmitter is located in Bluetown, Texas.
