= KHKZ =

Radio station in San Benito, Texas

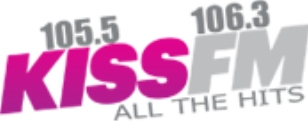
- San Benito, Texas; United States
- Broadcast area: Rio Grande Valley
- Frequency: 106.3 MHz (HD Radio)
- Branding: Kiss FM 105.5 & 106.3

Programming
- Format: Hot adult contemporary
- Subchannels: HD2: La Mezcla Fuego con DJ Xtreme
- Affiliations: Premiere Networks

Ownership
- Owner: iHeartMedia; (iHM Licenses, LLC)
- Sister stations: KTEX, KBFM, KQXX-FM, KVNS

History
- First air date: 1983; 43 years ago
- Former call signs: KGAR (1983–1989); KBOR-FM (1989–1992); KTJN (1992–2003); KMAZ (2003–2004)
- Call sign meaning: Hot Kiss (former branding)

Technical information
- Licensing authority: FCC
- Facility ID: 36166
- Class: C3
- ERP: 25,000 watts
- HAAT: 100 meters (328 ft)
- Transmitter coordinates: 26°8′28.00″N 97°50′4.00″W
- Repeater: 105.5 MHz KQXX-FM (Mission)

Links
- Public license information: Public file; LMS
- Webcast: Listen Live
- Website: kissfmrgv.iheart.com

KHKZ (106.3 FM) is a radio station broadcasting a hot adult contemporary format. Licensed to San Benito, Texas, United States, the station serves the Rio Grande Valley. The station is currently owned by iHeartMedia. It shares a studio with its sister stations, KTEX, KBFM, KQXX-FM, and KVNS, located close to the KRGV-TV studios in Weslaco, Texas, while its transmitter is located in La Feria, Texas.

== History ==
KHKZ started as country KTEX 106 (KTXF). Then in 1983 changed calls to KGAR and format to Hot AC. In 1989 the callsign letters were changed to KBOR-FM. Then again in 1992 the callsign letters were changed to KTJN. In 2003 the callsign letters were changed to KMAZ. In 2004 the callsign letters were changed to KHKZ.

== Branding ==
=== Hot Kiss 106.3 (2004–2011) ===
In 2004 the station used the branding Hot Kiss 106.3.

=== KISS 106.3 (2011–2015) ===
On February 19, 2011, KHKZ removed the Hot Kiss branding and replaced it with Kiss 106.3. The station also changed its logo, with the new branding, but retained the Adult Top 40 format since KVLY caters to the Contemporary hit radio format. Mediabase and Nielsen BDS will continue to describe the station as Top 40. During a round of company cut backs in mid-2011, the Morning Show with Jay and Amanda was canceled abruptly. iHeartMedia would begin to replace the Morning Show with Jay and Amanda with a nonlocal syndicated show from other markets. This began the era of nonlocal syndicated show replacements for the Rio Grande Valley and would later become a normal practice for iHeartMedia to do for other sister stations in the Rio Grande Valley market.

=== Kiss FM 105.5 106.3 (2015–present) ===
Due to KHKZ's signal covering most of the Lower Valley, the station announced on Christmas Day 2015 at 6 PM (CST), that KQXX-FM (which covers most of the Upper Valley) would simulcast 106.3 FM's signal on the 105.5 FM frequency, in order to cover the entire Rio Grande Valley. The simulcast was most likely due to 106.3 FM's signal, being too difficult to hear in the Upper Valley. The first song played on Kiss FM was Just Give Me a Reason by Pink featuring Nate Ruess.

== Former logos ==
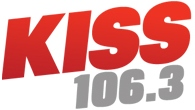
