= KBFM =

Radio station in Edinburg, Texas

- Edinburg, Texas; United States
- Broadcast area: Rio Grande Valley
- Frequency: 104.1 MHz (HD Radio)
- Branding: Wild 104

Programming
- Language: Spanglish
- Format: Rhythmic CHR
- Subchannels: HD2: Radio Libertad

Ownership
- Owner: iHeartMedia; (iHM Licenses, LLC)
- Sister stations: KHKZ; KQXX-FM; KTEX; KVNS

History
- First air date: February 1, 1972
- Call sign meaning: "Brownsville, Texas FM" and former "B104" brand

Technical information
- Licensing authority: FCC
- Facility ID: 40777
- Class: C
- ERP: 100,000 watts
- HAAT: 373 meters (1,224 ft)
- Transmitter coordinates: 26.101°N 97.839°W

Links
- Public license information: Public file; LMS
- Webcast: Listen live (via iHeartRadio)
- Website: wild104.iheart.com

KBFM (104.1 FM) is a commercial radio station licensed to Edinburg, Texas, United States, carrying a bilingual English/Spanish language rhythmic CHR format known as "Wild 104". Owned by iHeartMedia, the station serves the Rio Grande Valley. KBFM's studios are located in Weslaco while the station transmitter resides in Bluetown. In addition to a standard analog transmission, KBFM broadcasts in HD Radio using the in-band on-channel standard, and streams online via iHeartRadio.

== History ==
After signing on in 1972, KBFM started out with a broad-based Top 40 direction when it debuted the format on the air in 1974. But in 2004 they shifted to Rhythmic Top 40, thus putting them in competition with KBTQ (which would later exit the format in October 2005). KBFM has been previously known as "B104" .

=== 1992-1994 ===
KBFM makes a switch to "The Most Music Hot B104" with a Mainstream Top 40 format, beginning to play a mixture of pop, rap, and dance in rotation. During this time, Hot B104 builds its radio fanbase on live remote broadcasts from Club X and South Dallas. During these broadcasts, live DJs mix the current hits on-air alongside the Saturday Night "Hot Mix" which was also a pre-recorded mix show of hits from 8 pm to 10 pm and midnight to 2 am."A. C. Cruz, KBFM-FM Mc Allen, TX September 3, 1994 (Restored Unscoped)". February 12, 2021. Other programs included in this lineup are the "Hot 9 at 9" where listeners would call in, and introduce the top 9 most requested songs of the day. "Kiss or Diss" where listeners could call in dedications of a kiss to a significant other or diss another. "Sunday Night Magic" and "Midnight Magic" which consisted of love songs and live caller call-ins for dedications. "Champ or Challenger" weeknights at 8 pm where listeners would hear new music against other new music and vote for a winner to be defended the following weekday.

=== October 1994 - Fall 1999 ===
In October 1994, KBFM drops "The Most Music Hot B104" moniker after being acquired by Clear Channel Radio (later on iHeartMedia) from their station and begins to revert to their moniker of the 80s, B104 "All Hit Music and More" playing a strong lean towards the Mainstream Top 40 hits. This resulted in less hip hop and rap in the rotation. As the years progressed, commercials began taking over the airwaves over music play, oftentimes resulting in 1 or 2 songs being played followed by a commercial break. KBFM changed ownership several times in the mid-1990s, with Calendar Broadcasting selling the station to Tate Communication Inc. in October 1994, with July Communications purchasing it the following year."

Radio Personalities between 1994 and 1999:

-Leo Lopez, -Hurricane Shane, -Michael J., -Deena Rivera, -Debbie "Spookey" Cantu, -"The Girl Next Door" Mary Ann, -The "Hitman, -"Cool" Raul, -Kevin Page, -Billy Santiago, -Rio and Reyes, -Meridee, -Barnie, -Mike Ruiz, -DJ Grizzley, -DJ Kid Mike, -Marisa, -DJ Al Nino. July Communications sold off KBFM to Cumulus Media in July 1999.

=== February 2000 - February 2002 ===
The morning show of Rio and Reyes (The Big Tortilla Morning Show) is canceled due to a questionable phone call on air referencing emergency scenarios that did not sit well with Clear Channel Radio. Due to this cancellation, other personalities fill in. KBFM and Clear Channel Radio decide to make a switch and drop the "All Hit Music and More" slogan and switch to "Today's Hit Music" B104. During this, an effort is made to decrease the number of commercials and increase music airplay including some earlier hits of the 90s. During this time the morning show goes through personality switches from Billy Santiago to Meridee Hernandez and Tony Forina, as these switches occur the name of the morning show switches to "The Big Gordita Morning Show. Cumulus Media then sold KBFM, along with several other stations, to Clear Channel Communications (since renamed iHeartMedia) by August 2000.

=== February 2002 - March 2004 ===
KBFM and Clear Channel Radio make another slogan change by dropping the "Today's Hit Music" moniker and changing over to the "Valley's Number One Hit Music Station" B104 to align to the more modern era of the early 2000s music. At this time KBFM begins adding more pop-rock to their lineup to keep up with the ever-changing era of music at this time.

=== March 2004 ===
Due to the popularity of rival station, KBTQ 96.1 The Beat, with its Rhythmic Top 40 format and rapid decrease in listeners on B104, Clear Channel Radio makes a drastic decision to release several personalities on air and begin stunting with minimal to no commercials and pure hip hop and some pop in its rotation. Over 30 years B104 was about to transition into a new era of music dropping the Top 40 Mainstream Format. During Spring Break of 2004, KBFM dropped the "B" from its known name and switched over to "Wild 104" ushering in a new Rhythmic Top 40 format for its station. This began the Rhythmic War between KBFM and KBTQ, which would later exit formats in 2005. During this time "The Mojo Morning Show" is established with Johnny O., Roxy, and Frankie G.

Segments from the Morning Show Included: "Oldschool Check the Verse," "Mind Gutter," "Movie Trivia," "Morning Mix," "War of the Roses," "The Call," "The Cookie Call," "Mini Viaje at 6 am." Since March 2004, the local Mojo Morning Show had been the main staple for local radio in the Rio Grande Valley, beginning with Johnny O. and co-hosts Roxy and Frankie G., followed by a rotation of co-hosts from Switch, Dee, Ashley, and Lauren. After 17 years of the Mojo Morning Show with Johnny O. and its ongoing rotation of co-hosts, iHeartMedia decides to sever its ties with Johnny O. and the Mojo Morning Show including other personalities that had been main stays on the air. As a result, iHeartMedia chooses to put in a syndicate nonlocal morning show "Tino Cochino" out of California, in the morning, now leaving the valley with no local programming or morning show. iHeartMedia continues its process of personality layoffs in the Valley as well as throughout other markets and switching to nonlocal shows for various markets including the Rio Grande Valley..
