= XERDO-AM =

Radio station in Matamoros, Tamaulipas

- Brecha 73, Tamaulipas; Mexico
- Broadcast area: Brownsville–Matamoros; McAllen–Reynosa
- Frequency: 1060 kHz
- Branding: La Raza 1060

Programming
- Format: Regional Mexican

Ownership
- Owner: Grupo Radio Avanzado; (Radio Avanzado Gal de Valle Hermoso, S.A. de C.V.)
- Sister stations: XHMLS-FM, XHNA-FM

History
- First air date: December 8, 1951
- Former call signs: XEVH-AM
- Former frequencies: 1450 kHz (1951–2010)
- Call sign meaning: "Radio"

Technical information
- Licensing authority: CRT
- Class: B
- Power: 7,000 watts day; 2,500 watts night
- Transmitter coordinates: 25°45′00″N 97°48′20″W

Links
- Website: radioavanzado.com/index.php/la-raza-1060-am/

XERDO-AM (1060 kHz) is a radio station in Matamoros, Tamaulipas, Mexico, known as La Raza.

== History ==
XERDO's concession history begins on December 8, 1951, when Manuel L. Salinas, a radio pioneer in northeastern Mexico who also started sister station XHMLS-FM, was given the go-ahead to build a radio station on 1450 kHz in Valle Hermoso, known as XEVH-AM and broadcasting with 1,000 watts during the day and 250 at night.

Salinas's successors held on to the XEVH concession for decades, and in the 1980s, XEVH increased its nighttime power to 1,000 watts. In 1996, the concession transferred to Gilma Guedea Castaño, and in April 2003, it was transferred to Radio Avanzado Gal de Valle Hermoso, S.A. de C.V. Around this time, the callsign changed to XERDO-AM.

In order to carry out a major power increase, in June 2013, XERDO was approved to move to 1060 kHz with 7,000 watts during the day and 2,500 watts at night.
