= KRIO (AM) =

Radio station in McAllen, Texas

- McAllen, Texas; United States
- Broadcast area: Rio Grande Valley
- Frequency: 910 kHz
- Branding: Radio Esperanza

Programming
- Format: Christian radio

Ownership
- Owner: Rio Grande Bible Institute, Inc.
- Sister stations: KOIR, KRIO-FM, KESO

History
- Call sign meaning: RIO Grande Valley

Technical information
- Licensing authority: FCC
- Facility ID: 56477
- Class: B
- Power: 5,000 watts 3-tower day 5,000 watts 4-tower night (DA2)
- Transmitter coordinates: 26°17′53.3″N 98°12′27″W

Links
- Public license information: Public file; LMS
- Webcast: KRIO's webcast
- Website: www.radioesperanza.com

KRIO (910 AM) is a radio station broadcasting a Spanish-language Christian radio format. Licensed to McAllen, Texas, United States, the station serves the McAllen-Brownsville-Harlingen area. The station is currently owned by Rio Grande Bible Institute, Inc.

KRIO has a long and colorful history. During the 1960s and early 1970s, it was "The Big 9-10," a Top 40 formatted station emphasizing fun promotions and popular personalities in a fast-paced presentation with station jingles and other production elements. It was one of the top stations in south Texas until it was challenged first by KRGV-AM "The Enormous 129" licensed to Weslaco and then KBFM-FM "KB-104" licensed to Edinburg. Toward the end of the decade KRIO was managed by Charlie Trub who started two stations in the Valley, KRIX-FM and XHRIO-TV. KRIX was an automated album oriented rock station on 99.5 FM in Brownsville, while XHRIO broadcast on Channel 2 from El Control, Tamaulipas but originated its programs from studios adjacent to the KRIO radio station in McAllen.

KRIO was purchased by Henry Tippie from Charlie Trub. Tippie already owned KVLY FM, formerly KESI FM, in Edinburg, Texas. Tippie had hoped to regain KRIO's popularity with a "Classic" oldies format playing "The music you grew up with". After a few years, when the station was not performing as expected, the station was donated to the Rio Grande Bible Institute as a tax write off.

KRIO's programming is also heard on KRIO-FM 97.7 FM in Roma, Texas and KOIR 88.5 FM in Edinburg, Texas.
