= La Feria Independent School District =

School district in Texas, United States

Address
- 203 East Oleander La Feria, Texas, 78559; United States

District information
- Grades: PK–12
- Schools: 7
- NCES District ID: 4826040

Students and staff
- Students: 2,882 (2023–2024)
- Teachers: 214.01 (on an FTE basis)
- Student–teacher ratio: 13.47:1

Other information
- Website: www.laferiaisd.org

The La Feria Independent School District (LFISD) comprises four elementary schools: Sam Houston, C.E. Vail, David G. Sanchez and Noemi Dominguez, one middle school: William B. Green Jr. High, and one high school: La Feria High School. LFISD is ranked as a 4A school district. Its mascot is the Lion, the school colors are maroon and gold, and the district's motto is Expect, Achieve, Excel.

In 2009, the school district was rated "academically acceptable" by the Texas Education Agency.

== Schools ==
=== La Feria High School ===
La Feria High School is classified as an AAAA (4A) campus, as regulated by Texas U.I.L. regulations. Athletics include: Football, Basketball (Boys and Girls), Cross Country (Boys and Girls), Volleyball, Tennis (Boys and Girls), Soccer (Boys and Girls), Track and Field (Boys and Girls), Baseball, and Softball. During the 2008-2009 Football season, the La Feria Lions recorded the Rio Grande Valley's first ever post-season football win at the Alamodome, defeating the heavily favored Bandera Bulldogs 31-14.

=== W.B. Green Junior High School ===
W.B. Green is another "Academically Excellent" campus. Has Grades 7 to 8.

In February 26, 2024, William B. Green received a phone call of a bomb threat, and the campus was set into lockdown. They sent the students to La Feria High School, which was then set into a safety state.

=== Elementary schools ===
Sam Houston Elementary is the Pre-Kindergarten and Kindergarten campus, David G. Sanchez Elementary is our newest campus, and is home to 1st and 2nd grade C.E. Vail houses 3-4 graded, Noemi Dominguez house 5th and 6th

== Controversies ==
=== School names ===
When Noemi Dominguez Elementary School was under construction, the school board asked the residents of the city to generate a list of names for the new school. Forms were provided in the local newspaper, and residents wrote their choices and delivered it to the main office. A large majority of the vote was in favor of naming the school after retired principal and teacher, Mrs. Ruth Johnson or principal Carlos Verduzco. However, the school board chose a name that was not proposed by any significant percentage of the respondents. They named it after Noemi Dominguez, a 1991 graduate of La Feria High School who obtained her BA from Rice University and was a teacher in the Houston ISD pursuing a master's degree in education from the University of Houston before her life was cut short by Ángel Maturino Reséndiz. The school board's decision to name the new elementary school after Dominguez was a tribute to the short life of a local Mexican American woman.

The school board's decision was reached because of the board's desire to name the school after a respected Mexican American community member. Indeed, Dominguez Elementary School was the first local school to be named after a Mexican American. This was significant given the local history of Mexican segregation.

=== Dress and grooming codes ===
In July 2024, the ACLU of Texas sent La Feria Independent School District a letter, alleging that the district's 2023-2024 dress and grooming code appeared to violate the Texas CROWN Act, a state law which prohibits racial discrimination based on hair texture or styles, and asking the district to revise its policies for the 2024-2025 school year.

== Desegregation ==
Although the decision in Brown v. Board of Education in 1954 mandated an end to segregation, La Feria Consolidated Independent School District (LFCISD) and many other school districts throughout the United States failed to comply with desegregation mandates. In the 1960s La Feria had five schools: La Feria High School; Lincoln Junior High, Franklin D. Roosevelt, Robert E. Lee, and Sam Houston. Sam Houston Elementary School (1-4) was also known as the Mexican School. It was a segregated school for Mexican and Mexican American students. In rare instances, Mexican American students were admitted to Robert E. Lee Elementary School upon the insistence of parents and the approval of school administration.

In addition to the white school campus located at Robert E. Lee Elementary, Robert E. Lee housed 4th and 5th grade Mexican and Mexican American students at the original, two story High School [old] building. Corporal punishment was the discipline of choice and administered on a daily basis to Mexican and Mexican American students who spoke Spanish at the Robert E. Lee campus.

It was an administrative decision that determined whether or not 3rd grade students attending Sam Houston would be promoted to Robert E. Lee [i.e., the Anglo campus] after the completion of the third grade, or remain at Sam Houston Elementary for the completion of the fourth grade. Though attending the same school at Robert E. Lee, separate classrooms divided Anglo students from Mexican and Mexican American students. This did not change at Roosevelt school which was a 5th and 6th grade campus. The segregation continued through Lincoln Junior High. By the 1970s, the High School was not segregated. There were some Mexican American students who were exceptions to this rule of racial segregation and were placed in predominantly Anglo classrooms. These students were often children who had a strong command of the English language, and whose parents were educated and of middle class social economic status. Such parents did not want their children attending school with Mexicans and/or Spanish speaking Mexican American children. This basically constituted a type of class discrimination among Mexican Americans.

In 1971, the Mexican American seniors had their own club and no Anglos were allowed.

Also, in the 1960s, the student population at La Feria hit a record high. Enrollment increased at Sam Houston Elementary school. The district began a summer language program for Spanish-speaking children. After the Elementary and Secondary Education Act of 1965 passed, more opportunities opened for minorities. Title I allowed the hiring of teacher aids and provided funds to employ more teachers, which La Feria did. In 1967 the Head Start Program opened its doors at Sam Houston Elementary. Because of these external and internal forces the La Feria ISD administration, led by Mr. C. E. Vail until 1974 and then by Mr. William B. Green, began implementing the state mandated programs to show La Feria could comply and that its schools could excel. It was a slow gradual process, but Mexican American students and staff became more involved and visible in the school community. Circa 1962, La Feria already had a Mexican American female teacher at Sam Houston. In 1971 the first Mexican American school board member was elected. When Sam Houston desegregated in 1972, another Mexican American joined the school board. Also, in 1972 La Feria hired the first Mexican American counselor. By 1974 Mexican Americans were visible at all levels of La Feria school system. There were two principals, one at Sam Houston Elementary and one at La Feria High School, one counselor and six teachers at the high school and various teachers at the elementary and middle school level.

== See also ==
- La Feria
