= La Feria, Texas =

- City
- Motto: As Always
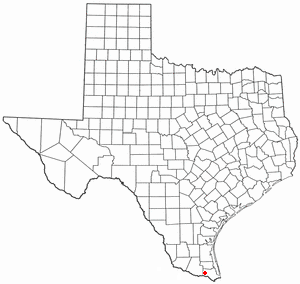
- Location of La Feria, Texas

- Cameron County
- Coordinates: 26°9′30″N 97°49′30″W
- Country: United States
- State: Texas
- County: Cameron

Area
  - Total: 4.40 sq mi (11.40 km^{2})
  - Land: 4.31 sq mi (11.17 km^{2})
  - Water: 0.089 sq mi (0.23 km^{2})
- Elevation: 56 ft (17 m)

Population (2020)
  - Total: 6,817
  - Density: 1,581/sq mi (610.3/km^{2})
- Time zone: UTC-6 (Central (CST))
  - Summer (DST): UTC-5 (CDT)
- ZIP code: 78559
- Area code: 956
- FIPS code: 48-40204
- GNIS feature ID: 1339313
- Website: www.cityoflaferia.com

La Feria is a city in Cameron County, Texas, United States. Its population was 6,817 at the time of the 2020 census. It is part of the Brownsville–Harlingen–Raymondville, the Matamoros–Brownsville, and the McAllen–Edinburg–Mission metropolitan areas.

== Geography ==
La Feria is located in western Cameron County at 26°9′30″N 97°49′30″W (26.158253, –97.824973).

According to the United States Census Bureau, the city has a total area of 5.5 square miles (14.3 km^{2}), of which 0.1 square miles (0.2 km^{2}), or 1.69%, is covered by water.

In 2004, the city annexed the Arroyo Alto CDP, increasing the population of the city by roughly 300 people.

== Demographics ==
Historical population
| Census | Pop. | Note | %± |
|---|---|---|---|
| 1920 | 236 | | — |
| 1930 | 1,594 | | 575.4% |
| 1940 | 1,644 | | 3.1% |
| 1950 | 2,952 | | 79.6% |
| 1960 | 3,047 | | 3.2% |
| 1970 | 2,642 | | −13.3% |
| 1980 | 3,495 | | 32.3% |
| 1990 | 4,360 | | 24.7% |
| 2000 | 6,115 | | 40.3% |
| 2010 | 7,302 | | 19.4% |
| 2020 | 6,817 | | −6.6% |
U.S. Decennial Census; 1850–1900 1910; 1920 1930 1940; 1950 1960 1970; 1980 1990 2000; 2010

=== 2020 census ===
As of the 2020 census, La Feria had a population of 6,817, a median age of 39.9 years, 24.7% of residents under the age of 18, 20.1% aged 65 or older, 91.0 males for every 100 females overall, and 87.1 males for every 100 females age 18 and over.

91.4% of residents lived in urban areas, while 8.6% lived in rural areas.

There were 2,415 households in La Feria, of which 33.7% had children under the age of 18 living in them. Of all households, 44.8% were married-couple households, 16.0% were households with a male householder and no spouse or partner present, and 32.5% were households with a female householder and no spouse or partner present. About 23.4% of all households were made up of individuals and 13.6% had someone living alone who was 65 years of age or older.

There were 3,063 housing units, of which 21.2% were vacant. The homeowner vacancy rate was 1.7% and the rental vacancy rate was 10.8%.

Racial composition as of the 2020 census
| Race | Number | Percent |
|---|---|---|
| White | 2,842 | 41.7% |
| Black or African American | 21 | 0.3% |
| American Indian and Alaska Native | 46 | 0.7% |
| Asian | 26 | 0.4% |
| Native Hawaiian and Other Pacific Islander | 2 | 0.0% |
| Some other race | 1,179 | 17.3% |
| Two or more races | 2,701 | 39.6% |
| Hispanic or Latino (of any race) | 5,920 | 86.8% |

=== 2000 census ===
As of the census of 2000, 6,115 people, 2,021 households, and 1,620 families were residing in the city. The population density was 3,075.1 people/sq mi (1,186.4/km^{2}). The 2,895 housing units averaged 1,455.8/sq mi (561.7/km^{2}). The racial makeup of the city was 74.91% White, 0.26% African American, 0.43% Native American, 0.33% Asian, 20.76% from other races, and 3.32% from two or more races. Hispanics or Latinos of any race were 77.45% of the population.

Of the 2,021 households, 35.3% had children under 18 living with them, 58.4% were married couples living together, 18.6% had a female householder with no husband present, and 19.8% were not families. About 17.4% of all households were made up of individuals, and 11.4% had someone living alone who was 65 or older. The average household size was 3.03, and the average family size was 3.44.

In the city, the age distribution was 30.6% under 18, 9.6% from 18 to 24, 22.4% from 25 to 44, 18.6% from 45 to 64, and 18.9% who were 65 or older. The median age was 34 years. For every 100 females, there were 86.5 males. For every 100 females age 18 and over, there were 81.5 males.

The median income for a household in the city was $24,660, and for a family was $28,832. Males had a median income of $22,933 versus $15,497 for females. The per capita income for the city was $12,064. About 21.9% of families and 29.2% of the population were below the poverty line, including 44.1% of those under age 18 and 19.5% of those age 65 or over.

== Government and infrastructure ==
The United States Postal Service operates the La Feria Post Office.

== Education ==
La Feria is served by the La Feria Independent School District. In addition, residents may apply to magnet schools in the South Texas Independent School District.

== Climate ==
The climate in this area is characterized by hot, humid summers and generally mild to cool winters. According to the Köppen climate classification, La Feria has a humid subtropical climate, Cfa on climate maps.

== Notable people ==
- Raquel Rodriguez, WWE wrestler and member of The Judgement Day stable.
- Edward Nordman, fruit farmer and member of the Wisconsin State Assembly
- Emmy Ruiz, White House director of political strategy and outreach
- Billy Storms, Professional golfer competing in the PGA Senior Open three times.
