= MMSP =

MMSP may refer to:

- San Luis Potosí International Airport (ICAO airport code: MMSP)
- Mitsubishi Motors Motor Sports
- Medium mathematical space, a type of whitespace character
