= Culiacán International Airport =

International airport in Culiacán, Sinaloa, Mexico

Culiacán International Airport Aeropuerto Internacional de Culiacán
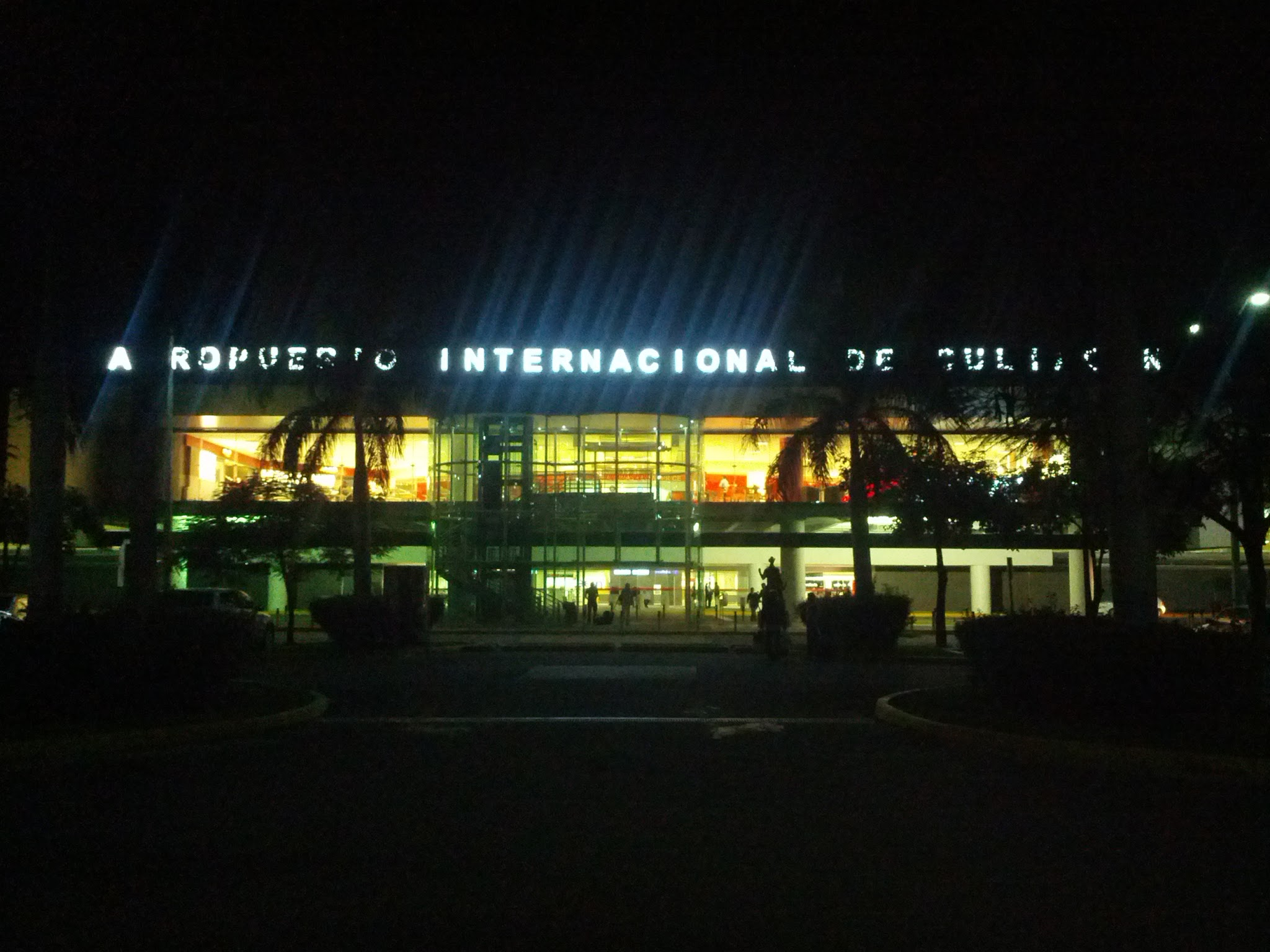
- IATA: CUL; ICAO: MMCL

Summary
- Airport type: Public
- Operator: Grupo Aeroportuario Centro Norte
- Serves: Culiacán, Sinaloa, Mexico
- Focus city for: Volaris
- Time zone: MST (UTC-07:00)
- Elevation AMSL: 33 m (108 ft)
- Coordinates: 24°45′52″N 107°28′28″W
- Website: www.oma.aero/en/passengers/culiacan/

Map
- Location of the airport in Sinaloa CUL (Mexico)

Runways
Direction	Length		Surface
Direction	m	ft	Surface
02/20	2,300	7,546	Asphalt

Statistics (2025)
- Total passengers: 2,162,362
- Ranking in Mexico: 12th ▼1
- Source: Grupo Aeroportuario Centro Norte

Culiacán International Airport, (Spanish: Aeropuerto Internacional de Culiacán); officially Aeropuerto Internacional Federal de Bachigualato (Bachigualato Federal International Airport) (IATA: CUL, ICAO: MMCL), is an international airport located in Culiacán, Sinaloa, Mexico. It serves as the primary air traffic gateway to the Culiacán metropolitan area, offering nonstop flights to many cities in Mexico and serving as a gateway in a heavily traveled air corridor connecting mainland Mexico to the Baja California peninsula. It is also a focus city for Volaris.

The airport accommodates military facilities for the Mexican Army and supports various tourism, flight training, and general aviation activities. It is operated by Grupo Aeroportuario Centro Norte and takes its name from the neighborhood of Bachigualato, where it is situated. Culiacán Airport ranks as the eleventh-busiest in Mexico and is the third-largest in northwestern Mexico. It is also the busiest for domestic traffic and the second-busiest for international operations in the state of Sinaloa. In 2024, Culiacán Airport served 2,240,034 passengers, and 2,162,362 in 2025.

== Facilities ==
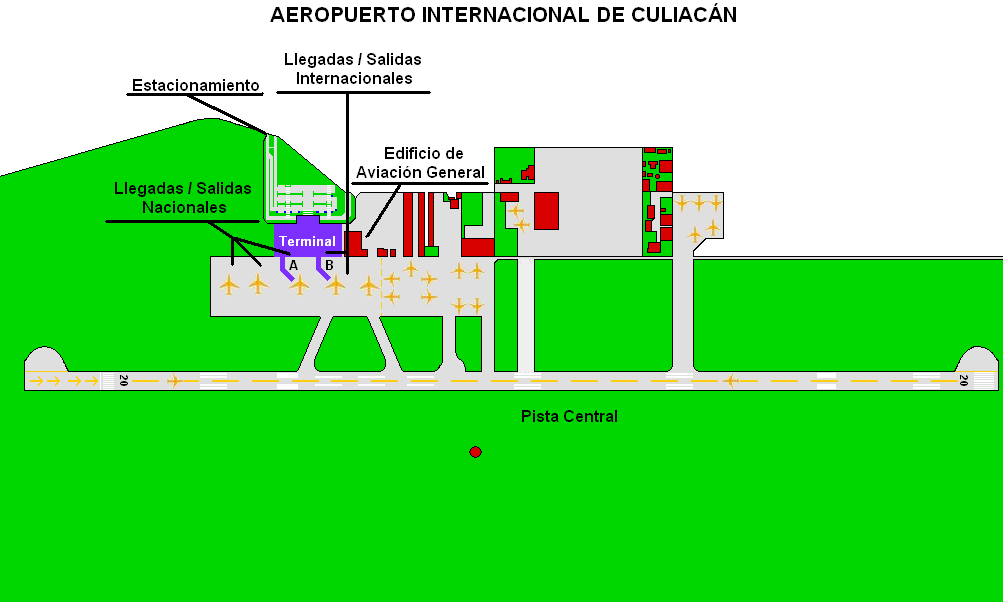
Culiacán Airport map

Culiacán Airport is situated in the Bachigualato neighborhood, located 9 kilometres (5.6 mi) southwest of the city center of Culiacán. It is situated at an elevation of 33 metres (108 ft) above mean sea level and features a 2,300 metres (7,500 ft) long runway. The airport features two aprons with parking positions for up to 10 narrow-body commercial aircraft, as well as a separate apron dedicated to general aviation. It has a capacity for 22 operations per hour. Under favorable weather conditions, flights arriving from the Baja California Peninsula and northern regions use Runway 02, while those arriving from other parts of the country use Runway 20.

The main terminal serves essential functions, with check-in and baggage handling facilities on the eastern side, and the arrivals section on the west side, which includes customs and immigration facilities. The arrivals section also provides services such as car rental, taxi stands, snack bars, and souvenir shops. The upper floor of the terminal houses the security checkpoint and a departure section that hosts a food court, duty-free shops, a VIP lounge, and a concourse featuring five gates, three of which are equipped with jet bridges.

Adjacent to the terminal, there are other facilities, including civil aviation hangars, cargo and logistics companies, and courier services. Additionally, there is a dedicated general aviation terminal that supports a variety of activities, including tourism, flight training, executive aviation, and general aviation.

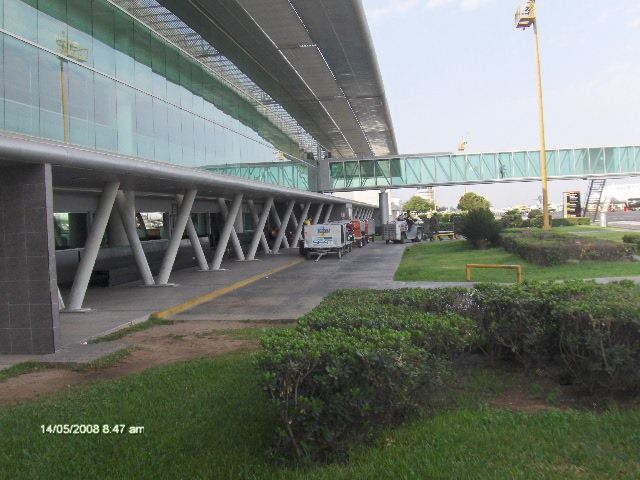
Passenger terminal airside

In 2023, Grupo Aeroportuario Centro Norte announced a major renovation project for Culiacán International Airport. This project is expected to be completed within 5 years and aims to accommodate an estimated 5 million passengers. The renovation plan includes expanding waiting areas, adding additional gates, and completely revamping the terminal area. The total investment for this project is set at a minimum of 636 million Mexican pesos.

Air Force Base No. 10 (Spanish: Base Aérea Militar No. 10 Culiacán, Sinaloa) (B.A.M 10) is situated at the southern end of the airport grounds. This base houses Air Squadron 109, which operates Cessna 182 aircraft, and it features two aviation aprons. One of these aprons covers an area of 13,800 square metres (149,000 sq ft), while the other spans 21,000 square metres (230,000 sq ft), offering 30 parking positions for helicopters and small airplanes. The larger apron is primarily utilized as a maintenance center for single-engine Cessna aircraft and Bell helicopters. Additionally, the Air Base includes five hangars and other facilities to accommodate Air Force personnel.

== Airlines and destinations ==
=== Passenger ===
Airlines	Destinations
Aeroméxico	Mexico City–Benito Juárez
Aeroméxico Connect	Mexico City–Benito Juárez
TAR México	Chihuahua, Hermosillo
Viva	La Paz, Mexico City–Felipe Ángeles, Monterrey, San José del Cabo, Tijuana
Volaris	Guadalajara, Mexicali, Mexico City–Benito Juárez, Monterrey, Phoenix–Sky Harbor, San José del Cabo, Tijuana

=== Cargo ===
Airlines	Destinations
Estafeta	San Luis Potosí, Tijuana

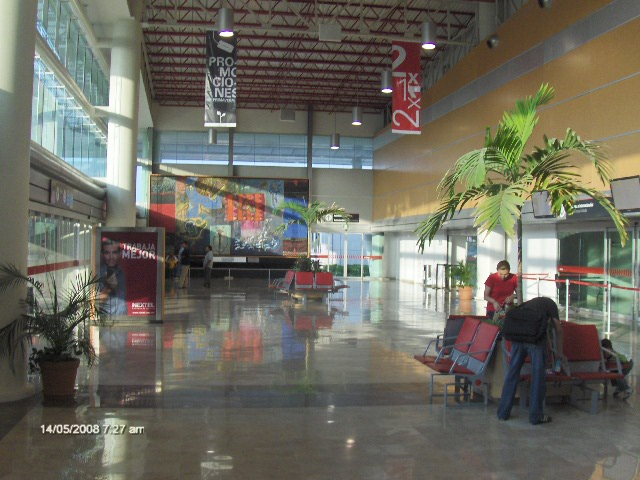
Passenger terminal main hall

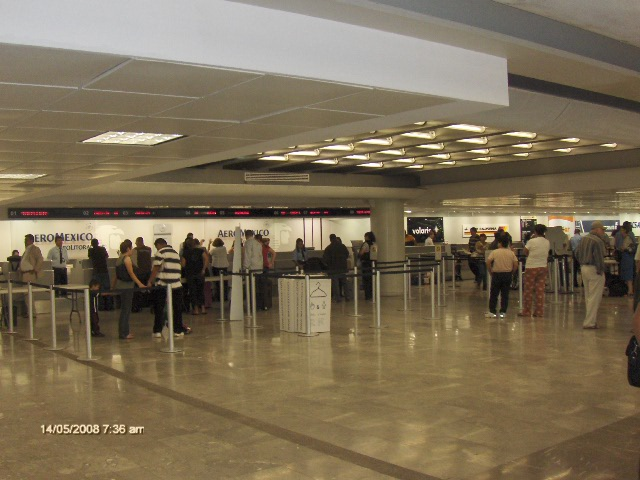
Check-in area

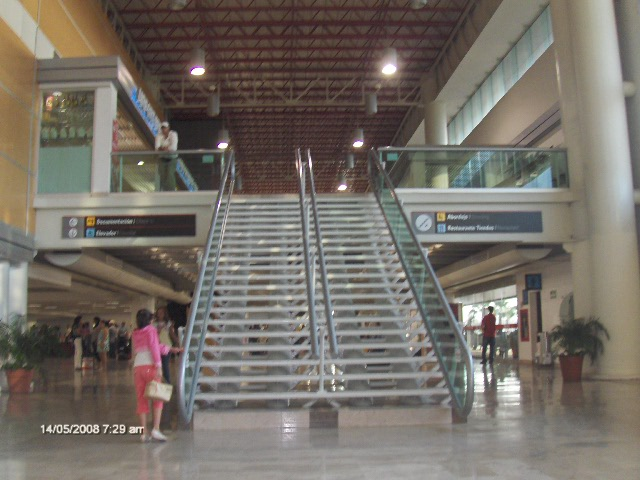
Passenger terminal main hall

=== Destinations map ===
Domestic destinations from Culiacán International Airport
Red = Year-round destination
Blue = Future destination
Green = Seasonal destination
International destinations from Culiacán International Airport
Red = Year-round destination
Blue = Future destination
Green = Seasonal destination

== Statistics ==
=== Annual Traffic ===
Passenger statistics at Culiacán International Airport
Year	Total Passengers	change %
2008	1,099,038	Steady
2009	1,062,893	▼3.29%
2010	1,059,904	▼0.28%
2011	1,070,706	▲1.02%
2012	1,168,380	▲9.12%
2013	1,252,235	▲7.18%
2014	1,307,717	▲4.43%
2015	1,432,315	▲9.53%
2016	1,726,654	▲20.55%
2017	1,909,651	▲10.60%
2018	2,270,834	▲18.92%
2019	2,458,863	▲8.28%
2020	1,373,102	▼44.15%
2021	1,970,211	▲43.50%
2022	2,426,003	▲23.13%
2023	2,612,249	▲7.68%
2024	2,240,034	▼14.25%
2025	2,162,362	▼3.47%

=== Busiest routes ===
Busiest routes from CUL (Jan–Dec 2025)
Rank	Airport	Passengers
1	Tijuana, Baja California	375,045
2	Mexico City–Benito Juárez, Mexico City	164,332
3	Guadalajara, Jalisco	155,557
4	Monterrey, Nuevo León	121,020
5	San José del Cabo, Baja California Sur	96,838
6	Mexico City-Felipe Ángeles, State of Mexico	54,554
7	Mexicali, Baja California	43,807
8	La Paz, Baja California	26,062
9	Phoenix–Sky Harbor, United States	11,720
10	Cancún, Quintana Roo	7,850

== Accidents and incidents ==
- On July 5, 2007, a twin-engine Sabreliner cargo jet failed to take off from the airport due to a loss of control resulting from a tire blowout and slid off the runway onto a highway. Three people died on board the plane and six on the ground; five more were injured.
- On April 24, 2012, a Cessna 182 registered XBMPN for private use crashed in the airport a few seconds after it took off. The plane was heading to Chihuahua Airport, and at the time of the crash it carried only the pilot, who sustained minor injuries. The aircraft remained in some trees at the end of the runway, still on airport property.
- On January 5, 2023, during the second arrest of Ovidio Guzmán López, an Aeromexico Embraer E190 operating a passenger flight to Mexico City International Airport was hit by gunfire from members of a drug cartel. There were no injuries amongst the passengers or crew on board. A Mexican Air Force 737-800 was also shot at.

== See also ==
- List of the busiest airports in Mexico
- List of airports in Mexico
- List of airports by ICAO code: M
- List of busiest airports in North America
- List of the busiest airports in Latin America
- Transportation in Mexico
- Tourism in Mexico
- Grupo Aeroportuario Centro Norte
- List of Mexican military installations
- Mexican Air Force
