= Monterrey International Airport =

International airport serving Monterrey, Nuevo León, Mexico

General Mariano Escobedo International Airport Aeropuerto Internacional General Mariano Escobedo
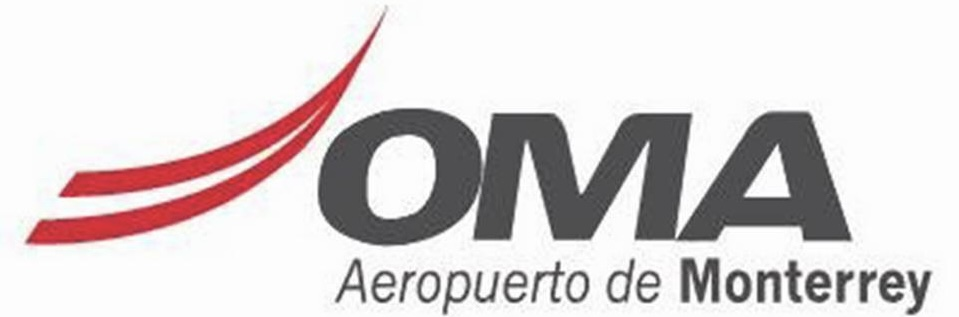

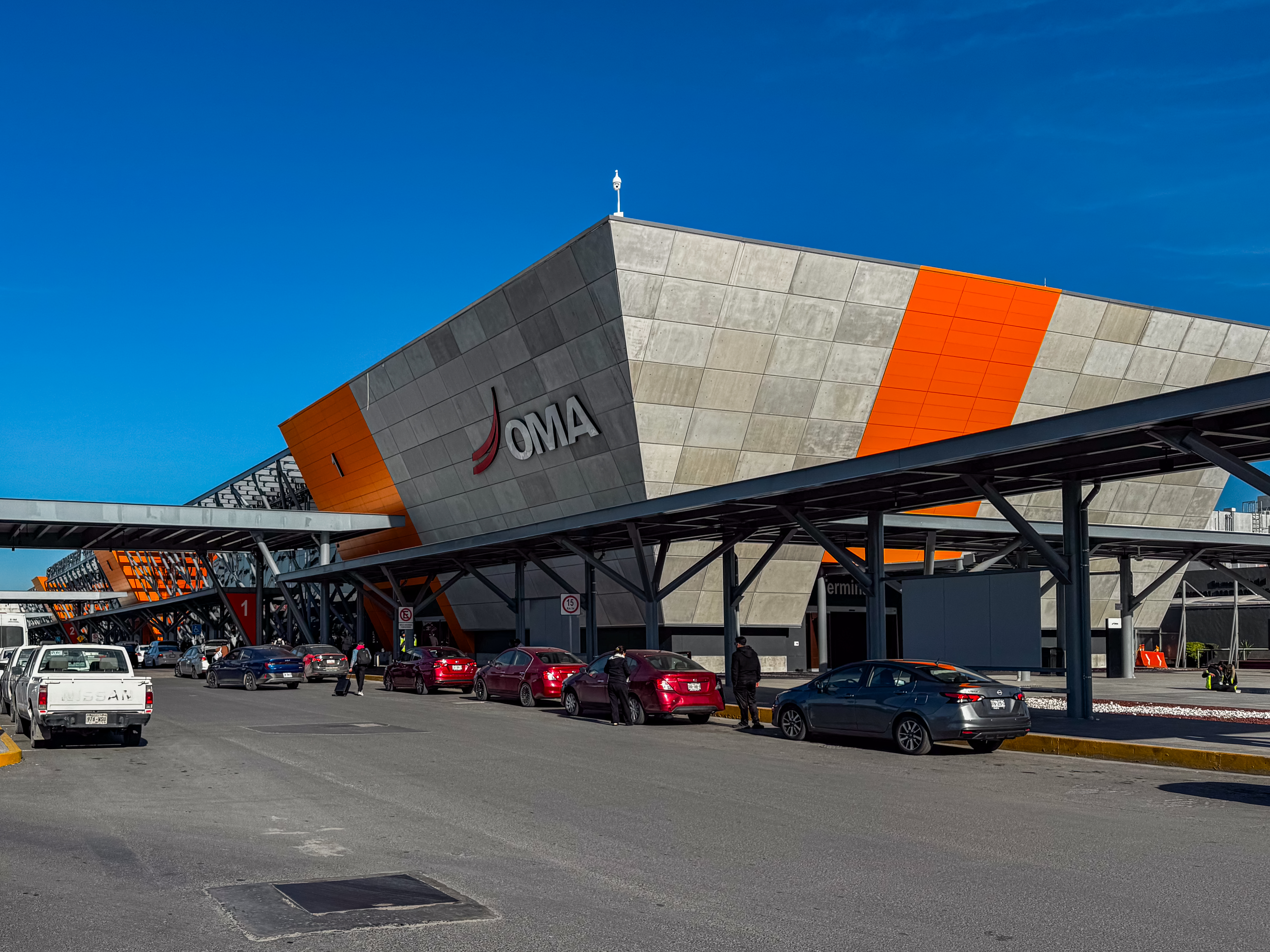
- IATA: MTY; ICAO: MMMY

Summary
- Airport type: PUBLIC
- Operator: Grupo Aeroportuario Centro Norte
- Serves: Monterrey Metropolitan Area
- Location: Apodaca, Nuevo León, Mexico
- Opened: November 25, 1970; 55 years ago
- Hub for: Aeromexico Connect; Aerus
- Focus city for: TAR Aerolíneas
- Operating base for: Viva; Volaris
- Time zone: CST (UTC-06:00)
- Elevation AMSL: 390 m (1,280 ft)
- Coordinates: 25°46′42″N 100°06′23″W
- Website: www.oma.aero/en/passengers/monterrey

Map
- Location of the airport in Nuevo León MTY/MMMY (Mexico)

Runways
| Direction | Length | | Surface |
| Direction | m | ft | Surface |
|---|---|---|---|
| 12/30 | 3,000 | 9,843 | Asphalt |
| 16/34 | 1,801 | 5,909 | Asphalt |

Statistics (2025)
- Total passengers: 15,623,275
- Ranking in Mexico: 4th
- Source: Grupo Aeroportuario Centro Norte

Monterrey International Airport (Spanish: Aeropuerto Internacional de Monterrey) (IATA: MTY, ICAO: MMMY), officially General Mariano Escobedo International Airport, is an international airport serving Greater Monterrey, Nuevo León, Mexico. In 2025, it served over 15.6 million passengers, making it the fourth busiest airport in Mexico by passenger movement, and holds the 13th position in Latin America and 44th in North America by passenger volume, offering flights across Mexico, the Americas, Asia, and Europe.

The airport is the main hub for Viva, Magnicharters, and Aerus. It also serves as a focus city for Volaris and hosts facilities for Mexican Airspace Navigation Services (SENEAM), supports tourism-related activities, and accommodates flight training and general aviation. Monterrey Airport is operated by Grupo Aeroportuario Centro Norte (OMA) and is named after General Mariano Escobedo, a 19th-century military officer from Nuevo León. In 2025, it handled 15,623,275 passengers, up from 13,581,599 in 2024.

== History ==
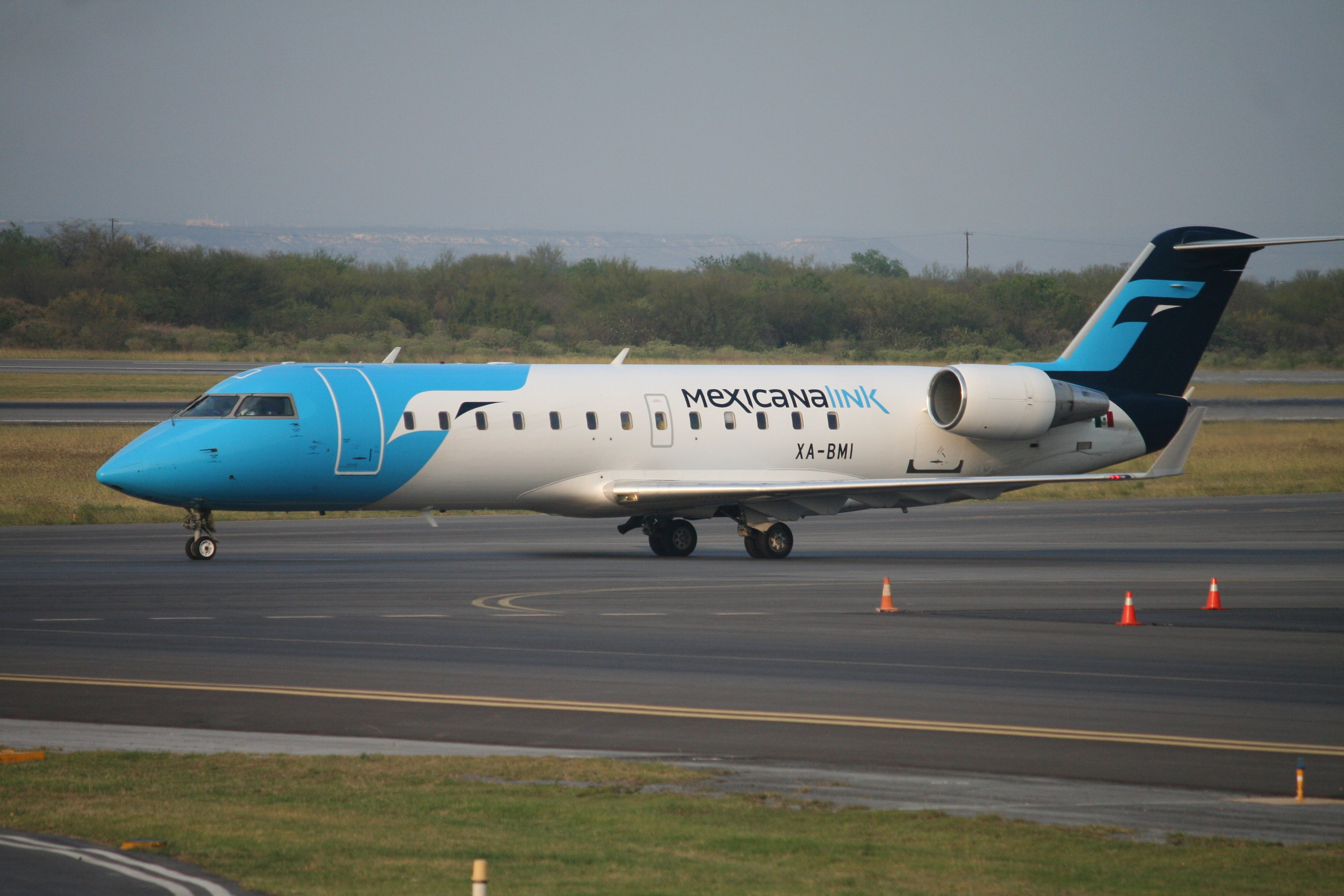
Mexicana Link Bombardier CRJ-200 at MTY

The airport was inaugurated on November 25, 1970, with the landing of a Mexicana de Aviación Boeing 727. It was built to replace the nearby Del Norte International Airport, whose limited safety infrastructure and surrounding urban growth prevented further expansion. The original terminal, now referred to as Terminal A, handled 346,000 passengers during its first year of operation.

Between 1976 and 1982, in response to Monterrey's growing economic importance, the airport underwent its first major expansion. A satellite concourse was constructed and linked to the main building via an underground corridor. By the 1990s, the airport had become a regional hub for Aerolitoral, the regional subsidiary of Aeroméxico, solidifying its role as a major transportation hub in northern Mexico.

In the early 2000s, Monterrey served as a hub for Aviacsa, which offered significant domestic and international routes. In 2006, Viva was established in Monterrey, marking a turning point as the airport diversified its operations with the introduction of low-cost carriers and the expansion of cargo activity. Terminal C was inaugurated to accommodate the growing presence of low-cost carriers such as Interjet and Volaris.

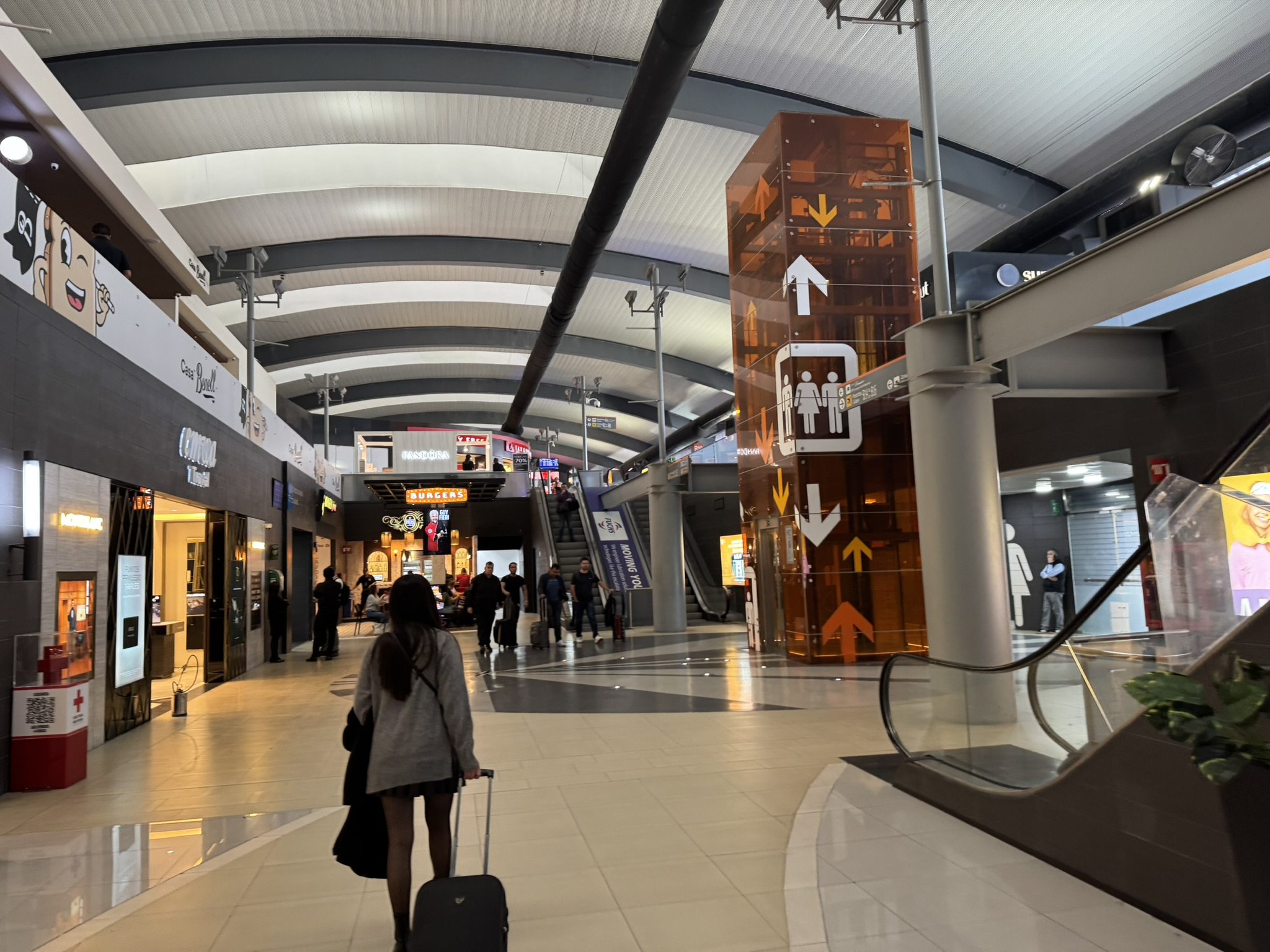
Main lobby at Terminal B

As part of Aeroméxico's broader international strategy, the airline launched new long-haul services from Monterrey. Between 2005 and 2009, the airport offered its first transatlantic link, a nonstop flight to Madrid operated with Boeing 767 aircraft. A nonstop service to Rome was offered from 2008 to 2009. In 2010, Terminal B was opened to serve as a hub for Aeroméxico Connect. In 2014, Monterrey was incorporated into Aeroméxico's Asia network when the airline shifted the stopover of its Mexico City–Tokyo Narita route from Tijuana to Monterrey. A service to Seoul Incheon was added as part of Aeroméxico's Mexico City–Seoul route, stopping in Monterrey on the outbound leg (MEX–MTY–ICN), while the return flight operates nonstop to Mexico City (ICN–MEX).

In 2019, Grupo Aeroportuario Centro Norte (OMA) launched a two-phase expansion project aimed at modernizing Terminal A and increasing airport capacity. With an investment of 4,245 million pesos (approximately USD230 million), the project includes new check-in areas and three piers with additional boarding gates, expanded baggage claim zones, and enhanced security facilities. Upon completion, the airport's annual capacity is expected to increase from 11 million to 16.5 million passengers. Although originally projected for completion in 2025, the timeline remains subject to delays.

In July 2022, Vinci Airports acquired a 30% stake in Grupo Aeroportuario Centro Norte (OMA), which has operated 13 airports across northern and central Mexico since 1995. The transaction marked a significant shift in the management and international integration of Mexican airport infrastructure.

In December 2023, the extension of Metro Line 6 to Monterrey International Airport was officially announced. Construction of the new Airport Station began on April 3, 2024. The project is intended to enhance the airport's connectivity to the urban fabric of Monterrey and to support increased traffic during the 2026 FIFA World Cup.

Regional airline Aerus began operations at Monterrey International Airport in 2023, establishing a hub with domestic and short-haul international routes. In 2025, Spanish flag carrier Iberia announced the launch of a nonstop service between Monterrey and Madrid, set to begin on June 2, 2026, marking its second destination in Mexico after Mexico City.

In April 2026 Grupo Aeroportuario del Centro Norte (OMA), announced it was investing MX $8 billion in Monterrey Airport between 2026 and 2030 to develop the airport as Mexico's primary aviation hub.

== Facilities ==
The airport is located in Apodaca, Nuevo León, Mexico, at an elevation of 390 metres (1,280 ft) above mean sea level, and features two runways. The primary runway, designated 11/29, measures 3,000 by 45 metres (9,843 by 148 ft), has an asphalt surface, and is equipped with an ILS approach system, VHF omnidirectional radio range (VOR), and a DME station. The secondary runway, 16/34, measures 1,800 by 30 metres (5,906 by 98 ft), also with an asphalt surface, and is seldom used. Although the main runway can accommodate wide-body aircraft such as the Boeing 747-400, the airport primarily handles narrow-body operations. There are three terminals:

- Terminal A: Gates 1–14
- Terminal B: Gates B1–B16
- Terminal C: Gates 21–33

=== Terminal A ===
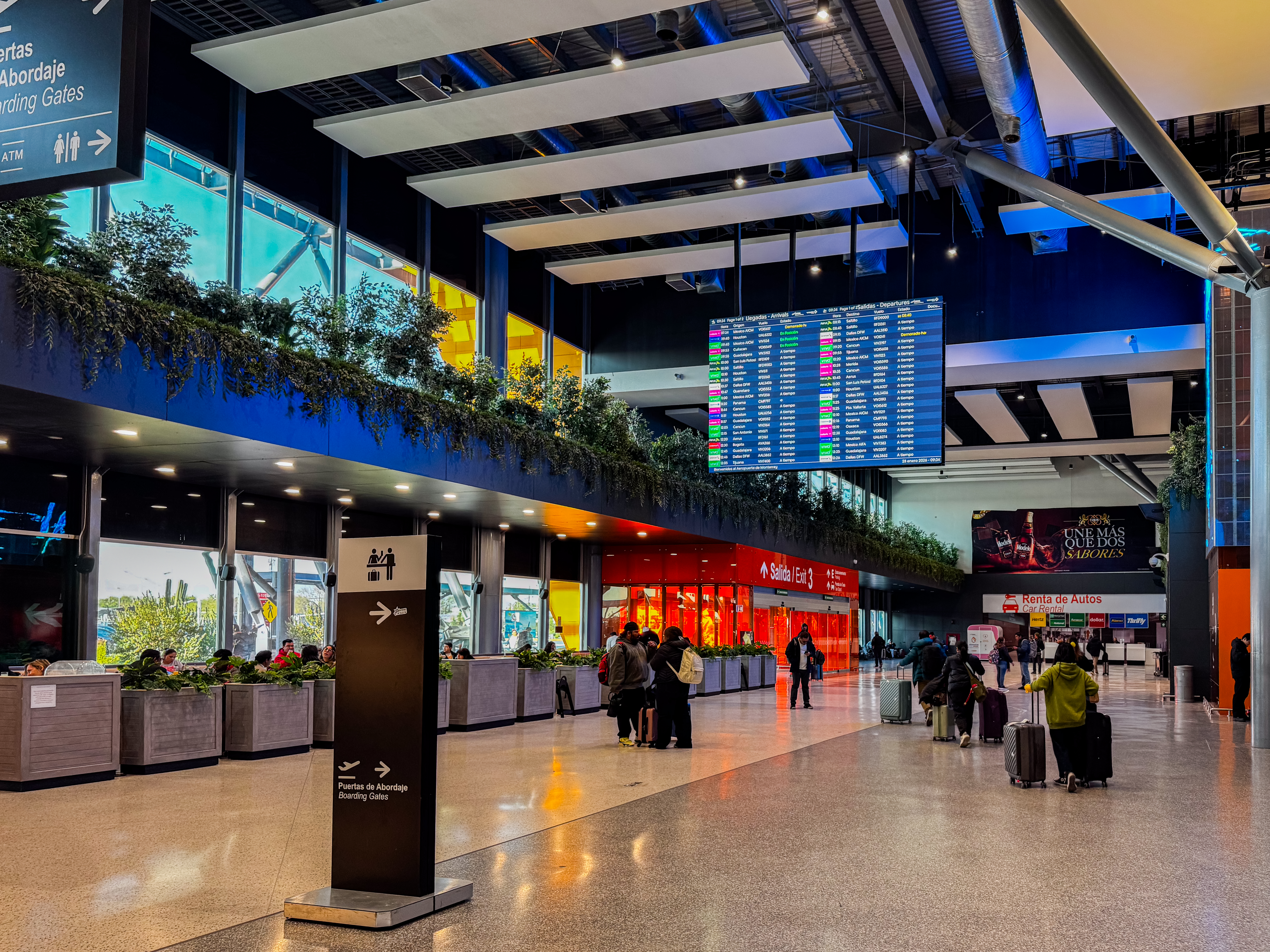
Terminal A interior

Terminal A is the oldest of the three. Originally built in the 1970s and later expanded, its layout includes a main building with check-in facilities, baggage claim, airline and airport offices, and various passenger services. A satellite building, accessed via an underground corridor, houses the security checkpoint, 14 boarding gates, VIP lounges, duty-free stores, customs and immigration facilities, shopping areas, and restaurants. The satellite is divided into two concourses: the North Concourse, which includes gates 1, 2, 9, and 10 on the upper level and gates 11–14 on the ground floor, serving domestic flights; and the South Concourse (gates 3–8), dedicated to international operations.

Passengers in Terminal A have access to lounges including the American Express Centurion Lounge, Salón Beyond by Citibanamex, and the OMA Premium Lounge. Airlines operating from this terminal include Volaris, Magnicharters, Air Canada, American Airlines, American Eagle, Copa Airlines, Mexicana, United Airlines, and United Express.

=== Terminal B ===
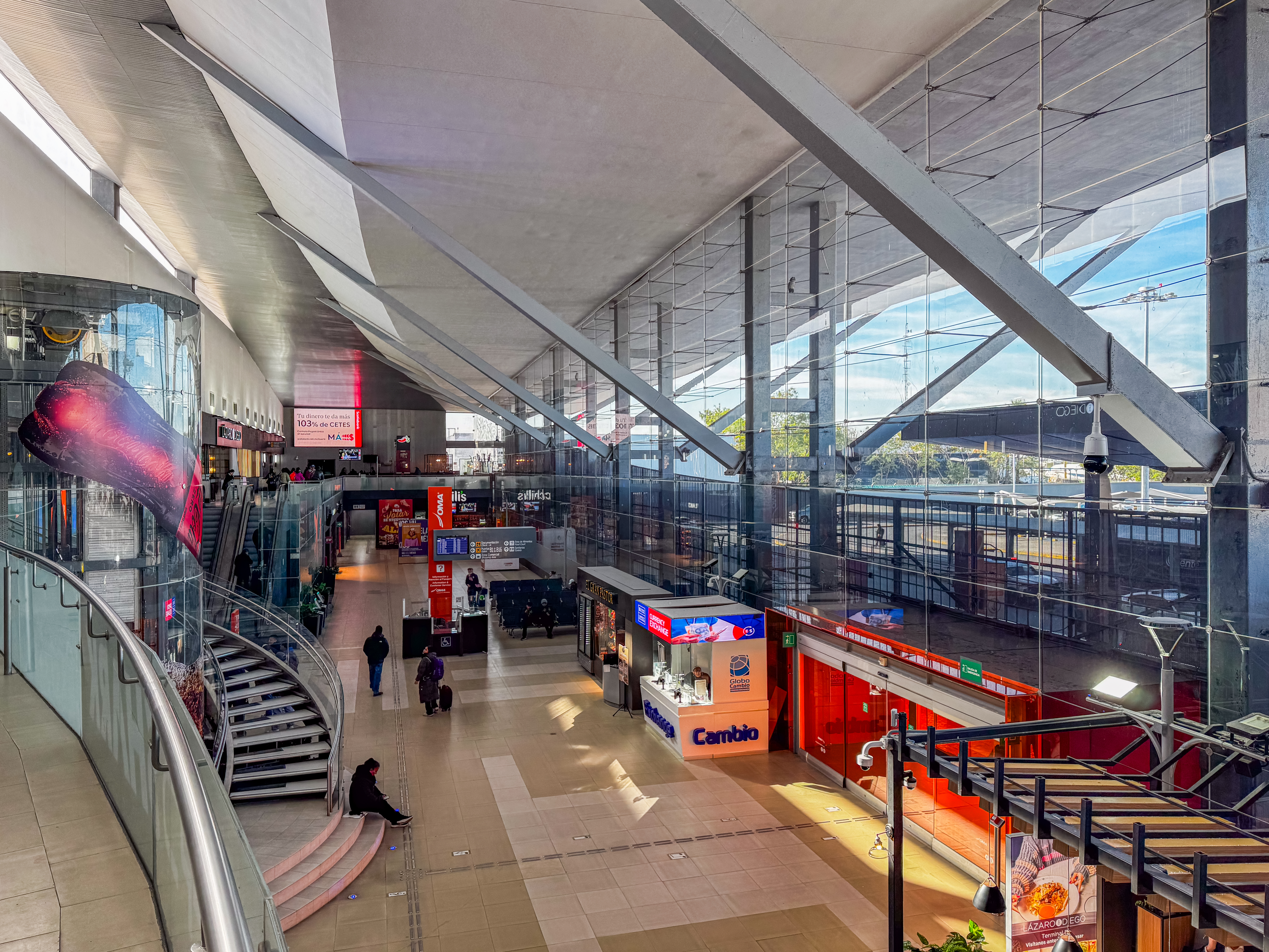
Terminal B interior

Opened in September 2010, Terminal B is a two-story facility with 16 gates, six of which are equipped with jet bridges, and multiple apron positions for smaller aircraft. Designed to handle up to 2 million passengers annually, the terminal provides standard services such as check-in areas, a security checkpoint, departure concourse, duty-free stores, baggage claim, taxi stands, and car rental counters. VIP services include the Salón Premier of Aeroméxico on the ground floor, an American Express Centurion Lounge on the landside, and the OMA Premium Lounge.

This terminal functions as a hub for SkyTeam carriers, including Aeroméxico, Aeroméxico Connect, and Delta Air Lines. It is also used by regional operators such as TAR Aerolíneas and Aerus.

=== Terminal C ===
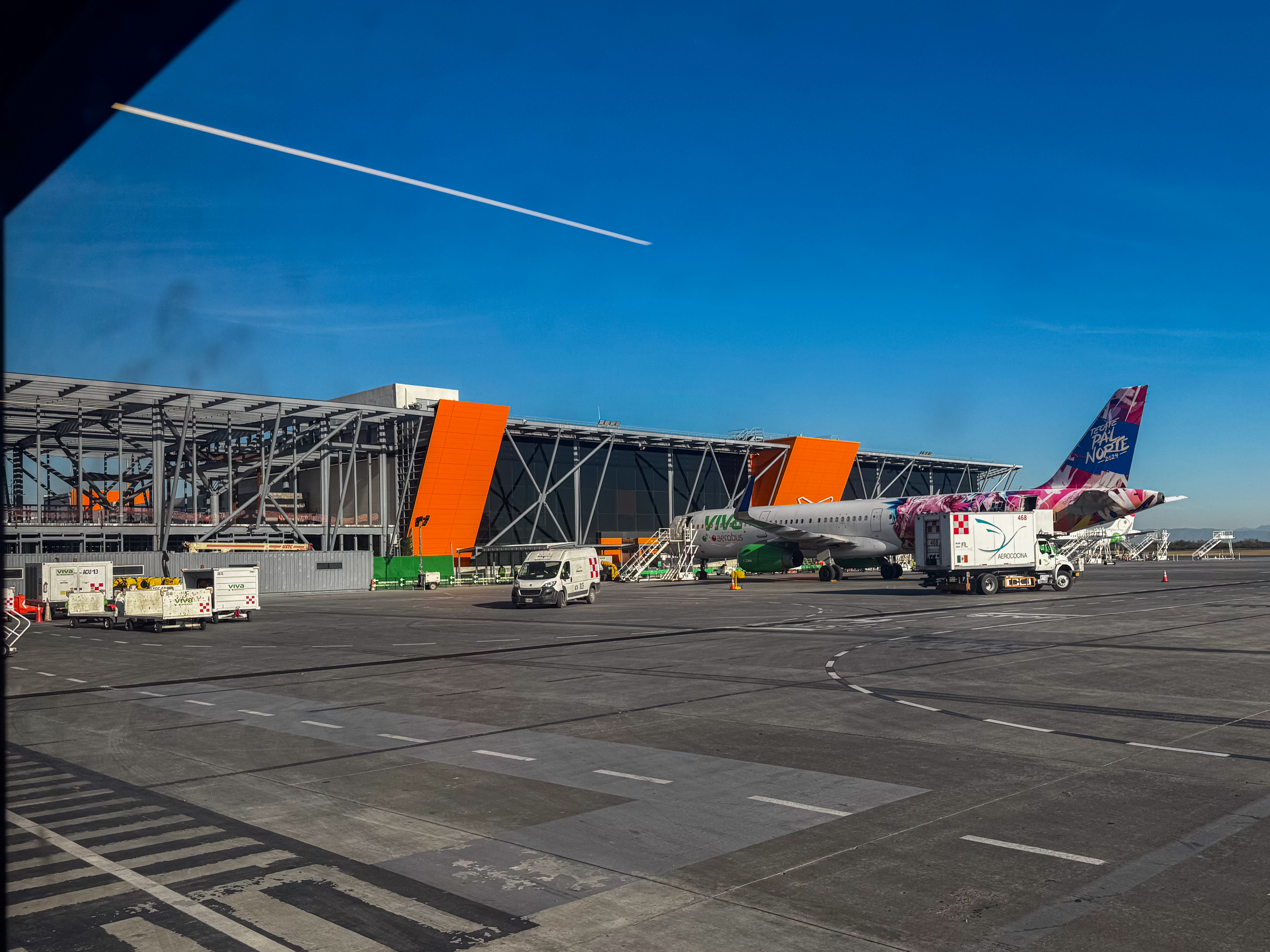
Terminal C airside

Opened on November 30, 2006, Terminal C serves as the primary hub for Viva. The terminal consists of a single-story building with essential facilities. The departures area includes check-in counters, a security checkpoint, and a departure concourse with amenities such as a duty-free store, an OMA Premium Lounge, and a food court. Arrival facilities include customs and immigration processing, car rental services, and taxi stands. Terminal C houses gates 27–33 and connects to a newly built pier with gates 21–26.

=== Inter-terminal shuttle ===
A free shuttle service operates between Terminals A, B, and C from 05:00 to midnight, with average wait times of 10 minutes. Boarding points are located at each terminal's main entrance.

=== Other facilities ===
Airport Boulevard features various amenities such as hotels, restaurants, and commercial establishments. Viva Aerobus and Grupo Aeroportuario Centro Norte (OMA) both maintain corporate headquarters within the Terminal C cargo zone. General aviation operations are supported by a dedicated terminal with a VIP lounge, a pilots' lounge, and a passenger lounge. The airport's air cargo terminal occupies 6 hectares (15 acres). It serves both national and international courier companies, including FedEx, DHL, UPS, and Estafeta.

The airport also houses the Monterrey Area Control Center (ACC), one of four such facilities in Mexico, alongside the Mexico City ACC, Mérida ACC, and Mazatlán ACC. Operated by the Mexican Airspace Navigation Services (Spanish: Servicios a la Navegación en el Espacio Aéreo Mexicano), the Monterrey ACC provides air traffic control services within the Monterrey Flight Data Region (FDRG), which covers the northeastern region of Mexico. This region shares boundaries with four other Area Control Centers: Mazatlán ACC to the west, Houston ARTCC (KZHU) to the north, Mexico ACC to the south, and Mérida ACC to the east.

== Airlines and destinations ==
=== Passenger ===
| Airlines | Destinations |
|---|---|
| Aeroméxico | Madrid, Mexico City–Benito Juárez, Paris–Charles de Gaulle, Seoul–Incheon; Seasonal: Denver, Las Vegas, Miami, New York–JFK, Orlando, Tokyo–Narita |
| Aeroméxico Connect | Detroit, Mexico City–Felipe Ángeles; Seasonal: Atlanta, Salt Lake City |
| Aerus | Aguascalientes, Brownsville/South Padre Island, Durango, Laredo, McAllen, Piedras Negras, San Luis Potosí, Tampico |
| Air Canada | Toronto–Pearson; Seasonal: Montréal–Trudeau (begins May 1, 2027), Vancouver (begins December 3, 2026) |
| American Airlines | Dallas/Fort Worth |
| American Eagle | Dallas/Fort Worth, Miami, Phoenix–Sky Harbor (ends December 1, 2026) |
| Avianca | Bogotá |
| Copa Airlines | Panama City–Tocumen |
| Delta Air Lines | Atlanta |
| Iberia | Madrid |
| Mexicana de Aviación | Mexico City–Felipe Ángeles |
| United Airlines | San Francisco |
| United Express | Chicago–O'Hare, Houston–Intercontinental, San Francisco |
| Viva | Acapulco, Austin, Bogotá, Cancun, Chicago–O'Hare, Chihuahua, Ciudad Juárez, Ciudad Obregón, Culiacán, Dallas/Fort Worth, Denver, Durango, Guadalajara, Havana, Hermosillo, Houston–Intercontinental, Huatulco, Las Vegas, Los Angeles, León/Bajío, Los Mochis, Mazatlán, Mérida, Mexicali, Mexico City–Benito Juárez, Mexico City–Felipe Ángeles, Miami, Morelia, Oaxaca, Orlando, Puebla, Puerto Escondido, Puerto Vallarta, Querétaro, San Antonio, San José (CR), San José del Cabo, San Luis Potosí, Tampico, Tapachula, Tijuana, Toluca, Tulum, Tuxtla Gutiérrez, Veracruz, Villahermosa; Seasonal: Cozumel, New York–JFK |
| Volaris | Cancún, Ciudad Juárez, Culiacán, Guadalajara, León/El Bajío, Mérida, Mexico City–Benito Juárez, Morelia, Oaxaca, Puerto Vallarta, Querétaro, San Luis Potosí, Tijuana, Toluca/Mexico City |

=== Destinations map ===
Domestic destinations from Monterrey International Airport
Red = Year-round destination
Blue = Future destination
Green = Seasonal destination
North- and Latin American destinations from Monterrey International Airport
Red = Year-round destination
Blue = Future destination
Green = Seasonal destination
European and Asian destinations from Monterrey International Airport
Red = Year-round destination
Blue = Future destination
Green = Seasonal destination

== Statistics ==
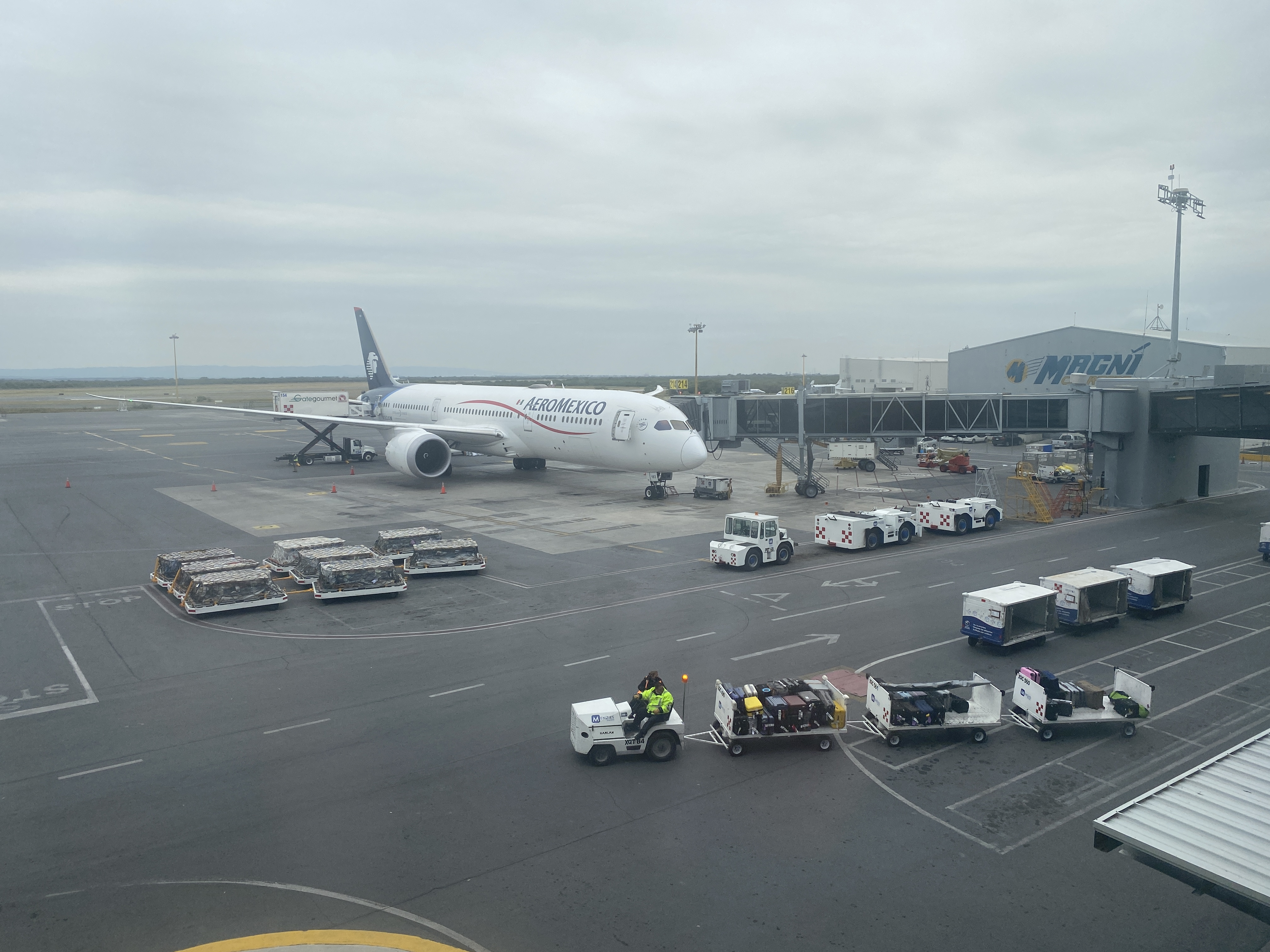
Aeroméxico Boeing B787-9 at MTY

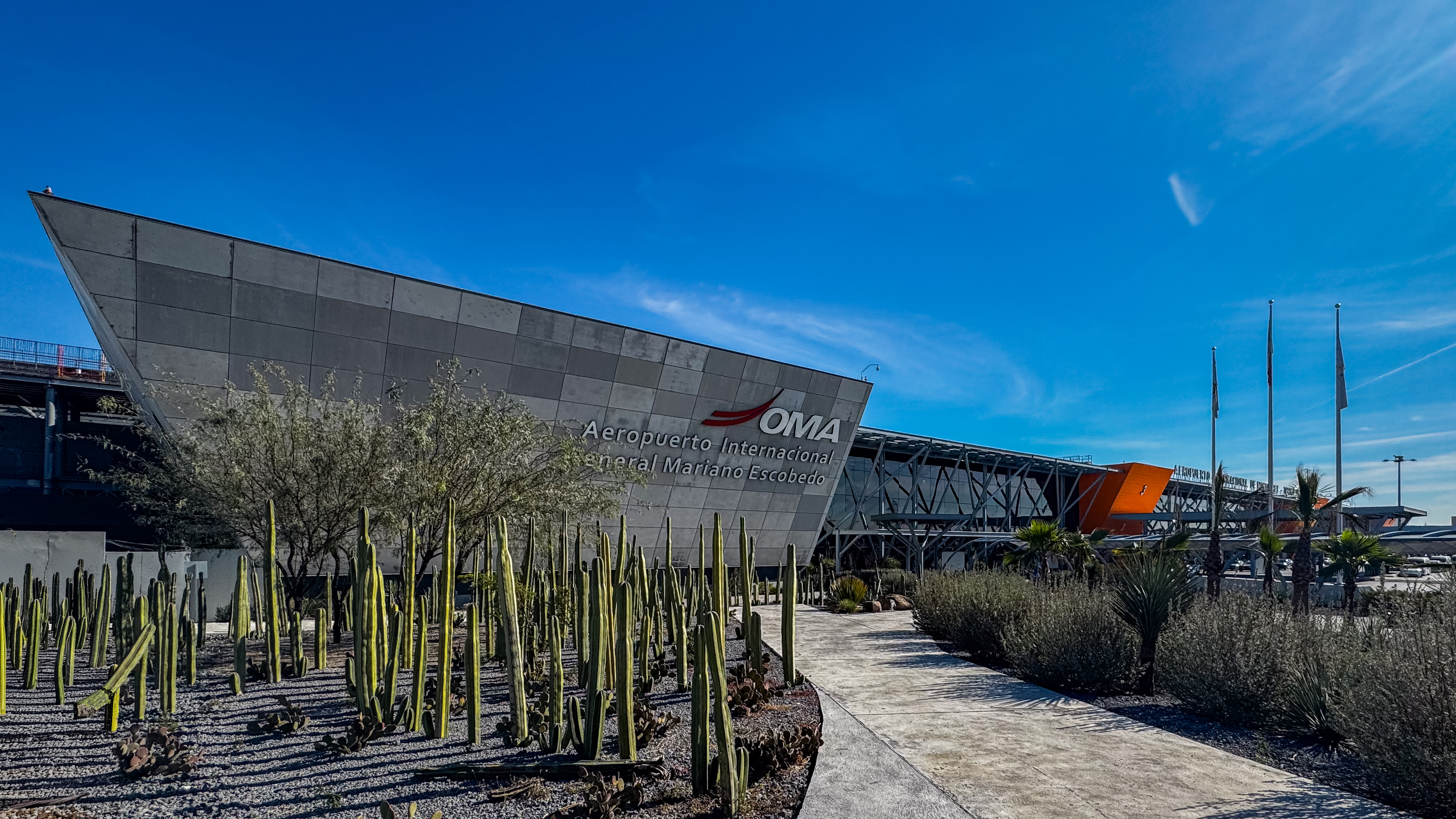
Terminal's A Landside.

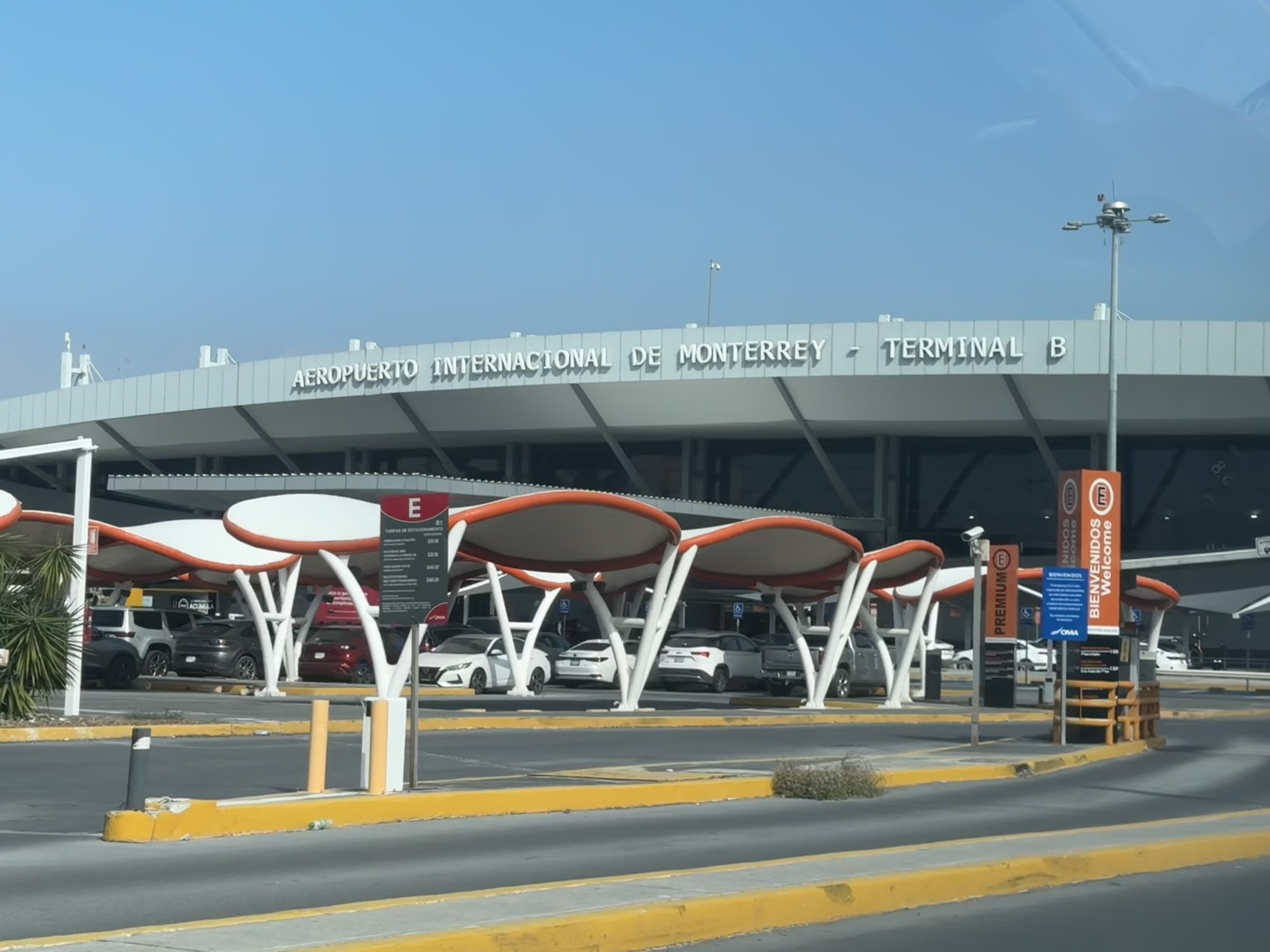
Terminal's B Landside.

=== Annual Traffic ===
Passenger statistics at Monterrey International Airport
| Year | Total Passengers | change % |
|---|---|---|
| 2000 | 3,680,397 | Steady |
| 2001 | 3,479,221 | ▼5.46% |
| 2002 | 3,446,469 | ▼0.94% |
| 2003 | 3,703,288 | ▲7.45% |
| 2004 | 4,293,816 | ▲15.94% |
| 2005 | 4,660,138 | ▲8.53% |
| 2006 | 5,253,600 | ▲12.73% |
| 2007 | 6,559,613 | ▲24.85% |
| 2008 | 6,586,190 | ▲0.40% |
| 2009 | 5,199,895 | ▼21.04% |
| 2010 | 5,380,412 | ▲3.47% |
| 2011 | 5,582,794 | ▲3.76% |
| 2012 | 6,105,910 | ▲9.37% |
| 2013 | 6,417,755 | ▲5.10% |
| 2014 | 7,128,531 | ▲11.07% |
| 2015 | 8,461,917 | ▲18.71% |
| 2016 | 9,178,533 | ▲8.46% |
| 2017 | 9,771,630 | ▲6.46% |
| 2018 | 10,733,186 | ▲10.84% |
| 2019 | 11,176,555 | ▲4.13% |
| 2020 | 4,994,170 | ▼55.3% |
| 2021 | 8,269,834 | ▲65.6% |
| 2022 | 10,943,186 | ▲32.3% |
| 2023 | 13,326,936 | ▲21.8% |
| 2024 | 13,581,599 | ▲1.9% |
| 2025 | 15,623,275 | ▲15.0% |

=== Busiest routes ===
Busiest domestic routes from MTY (Jan–Dec 2025)
| Rank | City | Passengers |
|---|---|---|
| 1 | Mexico City, Mexico City | 1,522,893 |
| 2 | Cancún, Quintana Roo | 741,798 |
| 3 | Guadalajara, Jalisco | 551,599 |
| 4 | Querétaro, Querétaro | 309,172 |
| 5 | Mexico City-AIFA, State of Mexico | 305,313 |
| 6 | Toluca, State of Mexico | 262,008 |
| 7 | Tijuana, Baja California | 255,592 |
| 8 | Puerto Vallarta, Jalisco | 240,696 |
| 9 | León/El Bajío, Guanajuato | 233,783 |
| 10 | Mérida, Yucatán | 233,083 |

Busiest international routes from MTY (Jan–Dec 2025)
| Rank | City | Passengers |
|---|---|---|
| 1 | Houston–Intercontinental, United States | 218,276 |
| 2 | Dallas/Fort Worth, United States | 207,136 |
| 3 | San Antonio, United States | 88,174 |
| 4 | Chicago–O'Hare, United States | 87,563 |
| 5 | Las Vegas, United States | 70,583 |
| 6 | Atlanta, United States | 64,527 |
| 7 | Madrid, Spain | 60,788 |
| 8 | Los Angeles, United States | 54,429 |
| 9 | Miami, United States | 53,552 |
| 10 | Orlando, United States | 33,670 |

== Ground transportation ==
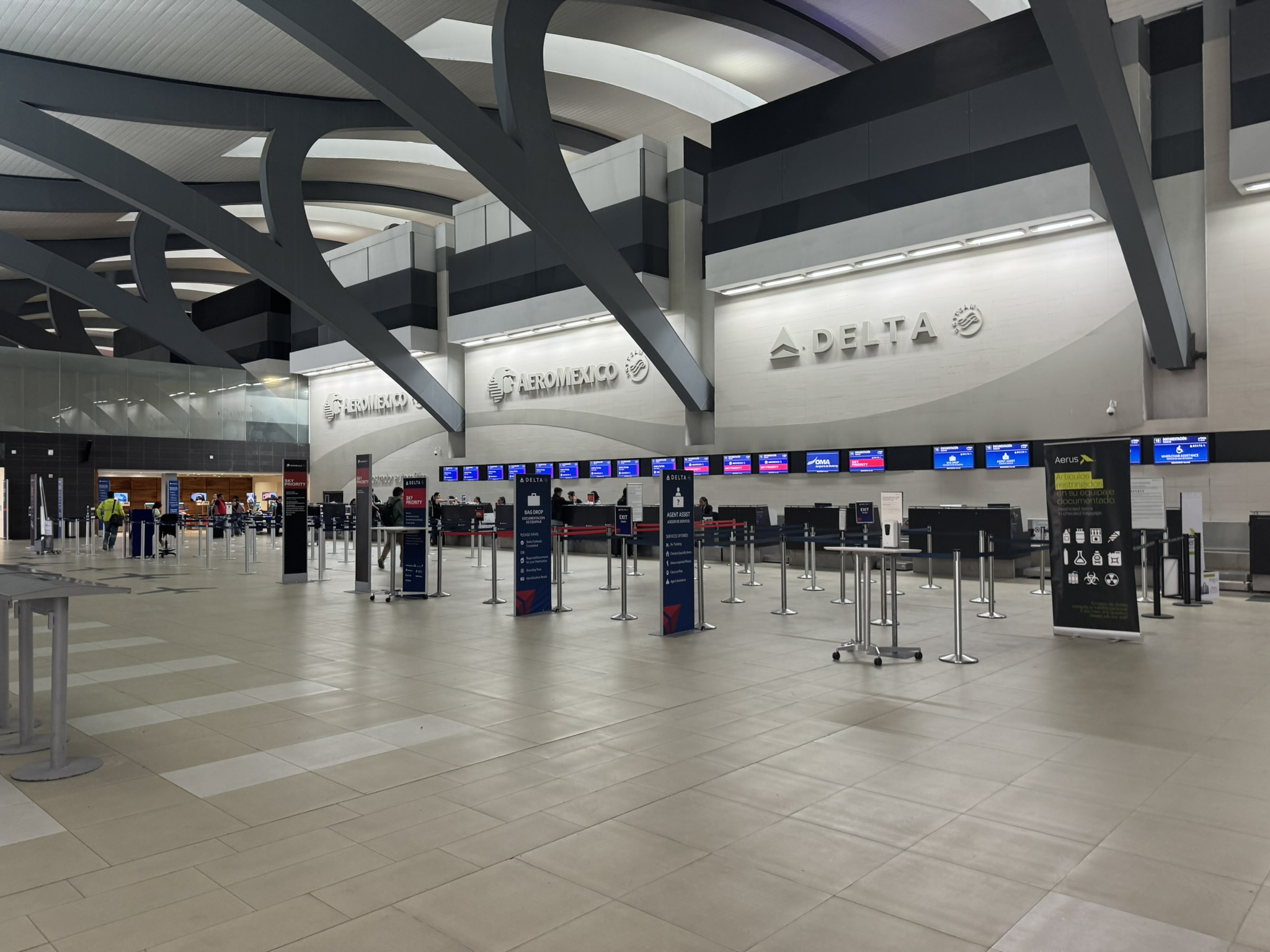
Check-in counters at Terminal B

Monterrey Airport is located 28 kilometres (17 mi) northeast of downtown Monterrey and is accessible solely by road. Local bus, shuttle, and taxi services, as well as long-distance bus services to cities in Nuevo León, Coahuila, Tamaulipas, San Luis Potosí, and Texas, are available. Travel time by car from the city center typically ranges from 30 to 60 minutes depending on traffic conditions. The airport offers extensive short- and long-term parking facilities, and each terminal has multiple taxi and car rental service counters.

=== Local bus ===
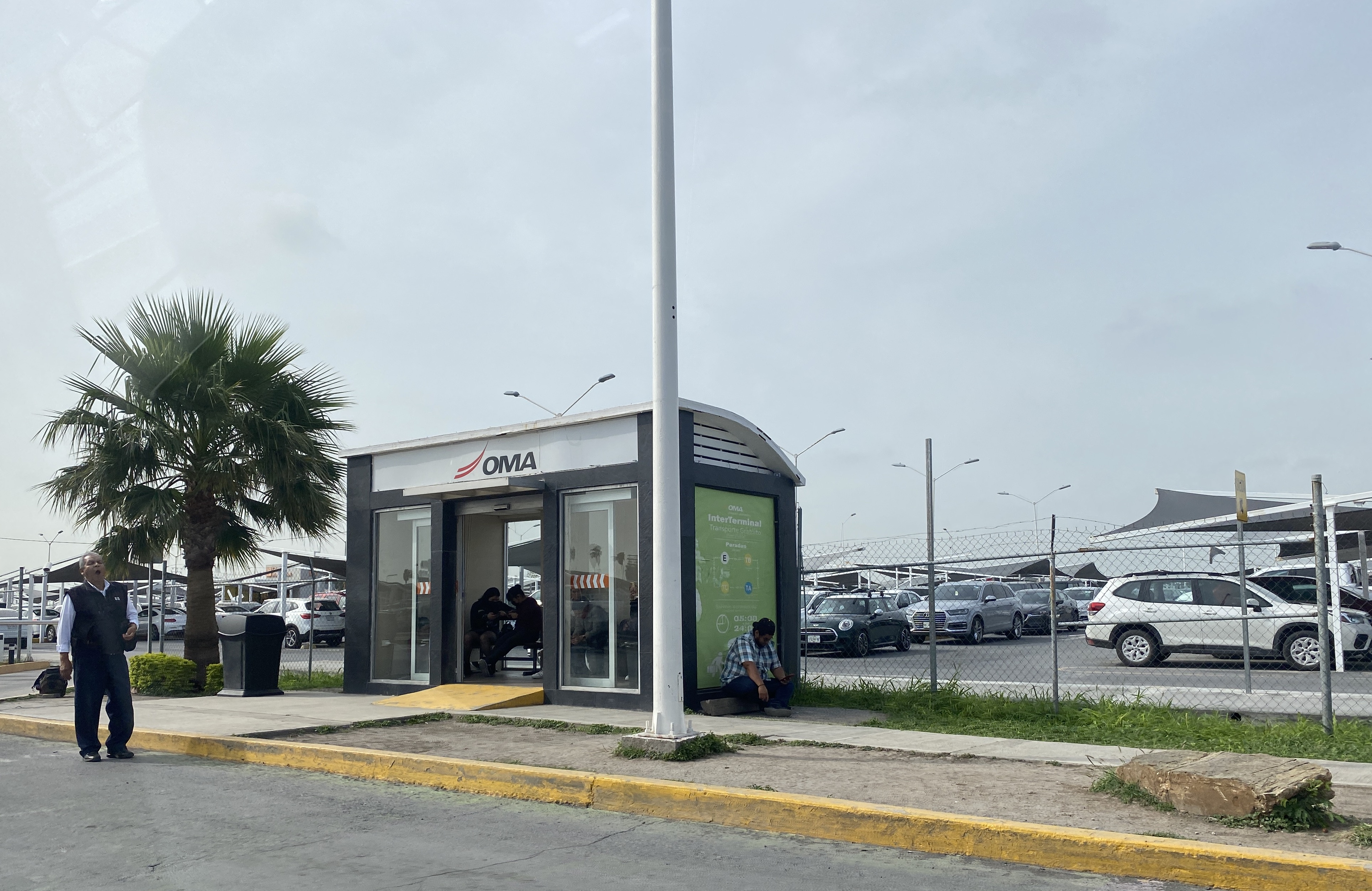
Ruta 109 Y Griega Aeropuerto Terminal A bus stop

- The formerly known as Ruta Express ("Express Bus Airport"), now known as the R-109 Y Griega Aeropueto ("Route 109, Y Griega - Airport"), is a public bus line, operates from the airport to Y-Griega Station on Line 1 of the Monterrey Metro.
- Ahead of the 2026 North American FIFA World Cup, the airport got a second, direct route, from the BBVA Stadium, to the Airport, the Ruta Estadio-Aeropuerto ("Express Route Airport-Stadium"), which can be aborded on either of terminals A or C, goes to the Hotel zone near the airport, and next, it goes into a non-stop route to the Exposición Metro Station through the Airport Expressway, and viceversa. It has 9 bus stops, 8 in the Airport Area, and only Exposición out of the Airport.
- Grupo Senda operates services to both Y-Griega and San Jerónimo Bus Station, while Noreste runs hourly buses from the Airport to the Central Bus Station. There are two main bus stops at the airport: one between Terminals A and B, and another in front of Terminal C. Tickets can be purchased at terminal information desks (130 MXN) or online (110 MXN). Travel time to the Central Bus Station, located approximately 3 kilometres (1.9 mi) northwest of Macroplaza, is around 60 minutes. From there, passengers can transfer to the Metro or long-distance buses.

=== Private shuttle ===
VivaBus offers shuttle transportation exclusively for Viva passengers, serving both the Central Bus Station and Terminal Fierro (near Y-Griega Station). Transporte Aeroméxico provides hourly shuttle services from Terminal B to Y-Griega, Garza Sada Bus Station, and Hotel Son Mar (two blocks from the Central Bus Station). Aero Contaxi operates similar routes from Terminal C.

=== Long-distance bus ===
Several coach operators connect the airport with nearby cities. Noreste runs direct services to destinations in Tamaulipas and Texas, while Grupo Senda offers routes to Saltillo, Monclova, Piedras Negras, and Ramos Arizpe in Coahuila; Reynosa and Nuevo Laredo in Tamaulipas; and Matehuala in San Luis Potosí.

=== Taxi ===
Several taxi companies operate from the airport. Golden provides taxi and van services throughout the Monterrey metropolitan area. Suburban offers online booking for airport transfers. Airport-exclusive providers such as Taxi Aeropuerto, Taxis Aeropuerto Monterrey, Taxis Totsa, and TPA serve both the city and nearby municipalities, including Saltillo.

== Accidents and incidents ==
- On February 11, 2010, MexicanaClick de Aviación Flight 7222, operated by Fokker 100 XA-SHJ, suffered an undercarriage malfunction on approach to Quetzalcóatl International Airport, Nuevo Laredo. A low fly-past confirmed that both main gears had not deployed. The aircraft diverted to Monterrey. It was substantially damaged in the landing, having departed the runway and spun through 180°.
- On April 13, 2010, an Aerounion – Aerotransporte de Carga Union Airbus A-300B4-200, registration XA-TUE performing a freight flight, AeroUnion Flight 302 from Mexico (Mexico) to Monterrey (Mexico) with five crew, crashed on approach to land on General Mariano Escobedo International Airport's runway 11. The aircraft came to rest on a highway at around 23:30L (04:30Z Apr 14). All on board died, one person in a truck on the highway was also reported killed, and the airplane was destroyed after a large fire broke out.
- On November 24, 2010, a Mexican Air Force AN-32 cargo flight crashed when taking off from General Mariano Escobedo International Airport for a flight to Mexico City. All five crew members died.
- On December 9, 2012, a Learjet 25 carrying Mexican-American singer Jenni Rivera and four other passengers, and two crew crashed seven minutes after take-off, while on its way to Toluca. All seven occupants died.

== See also ==
- List of the busiest airports in Mexico
- List of airports in Mexico
- List of airports by ICAO code: M
- List of busiest airports in North America
- List of the busiest airports in Latin America
- Transportation in Mexico
- Tourism in Mexico
- Area control center
- List of area control centers
- Flight information region
