= Estafeta Carga Aérea =

Mexican cargo airline

IATA	ICAO	Call sign
E7	ESF	ESTAFETA
- Founded: 9 February 2000; 26 years ago
- Commenced operations: 2 November 2000; 25 years ago
- Hubs: San Luis Potosí International Airport
- Fleet size: 6
- Destinations: 13
- Headquarters: Mexico City, Mexico
- Website: estafeta.com

Estafeta Carga Aérea, S.A. de C.V. is a Mexican cargo airline based in Mexico City. It operates domestic cargo charters in Mexico and the United States and has over 25 interline agreements providing connecting services to the rest of the Americas, Europe and Asia. Its main base is Ponciano Arriaga International Airport, San Luis Potosí.

== History ==
The airline was established on 9 February 2000 and started operations on 2 November 2000. It began with domestic cargo services and added international services in January 2002. It is wholly owned by the Estafeta Group and has 174 employees (at March 2007).In 2004 Estafeta Carga Aerea introduced their Boeing 737-300Fs. In July 2024, an agreement for the United Parcel Service to acquire Estafeta was revealed.

== Destinations ==
The airline offers service to 12 Mexican cities and 1 in the United States:

Hub
New destination
Seasonal

City	State	IATA	ICAO	Airport	Ref
Cancún	(Mexico) (Quintana Roo)	CUN	MMUN	Cancún International Airport	
Chihuahua	(Mexico) (Chihuahua)	CUU	MMCU	Chihuahua International Airport	
Ciudad Juárez	(Mexico) (Chihuahua)	CJS	MMCS	Ciudad Juárez International Airport	
Culiacán	(Mexico) (Sinaloa)	CUL	MMCL	Culiacán International Airport	
Guadalajara	(Mexico) (Jalisco)	GDL	MMGL	Miguel Hidalgo y Costilla Guadalajara International Airport	
Hermosillo	(Mexico) (Sonora)	HMO	MMHO	Hermosillo International Airport	
La Paz	(Mexico) (Baja California Sur)	LAP	MMLP	La Paz International Airport	
Mérida	(Mexico) (Yucatán)	MID	MMMD	Mérida International Airport	
Mexico City	(Mexico City)	MEX	MMMX	Mexico City International Airport	
Monterrey	MEX (Nuevo León)	MTY	MMMY	Monterrey International Airport	
San Luis Potosí	(Mexico) (San Luis Potosí)	SLP	MMSP	San Luis Potosí International Airport	
Tijuana	(Mexico) (Baja California)	TIJ	MMTJ	Tijuana International Airport	
Villahermosa	(Mexico) (Tabasco)	VSA	MMVA	Villahermosa International Airport	
Miami	(United States) (Florida)	MIA	KMIA	Miami International Airport	

== Fleet ==
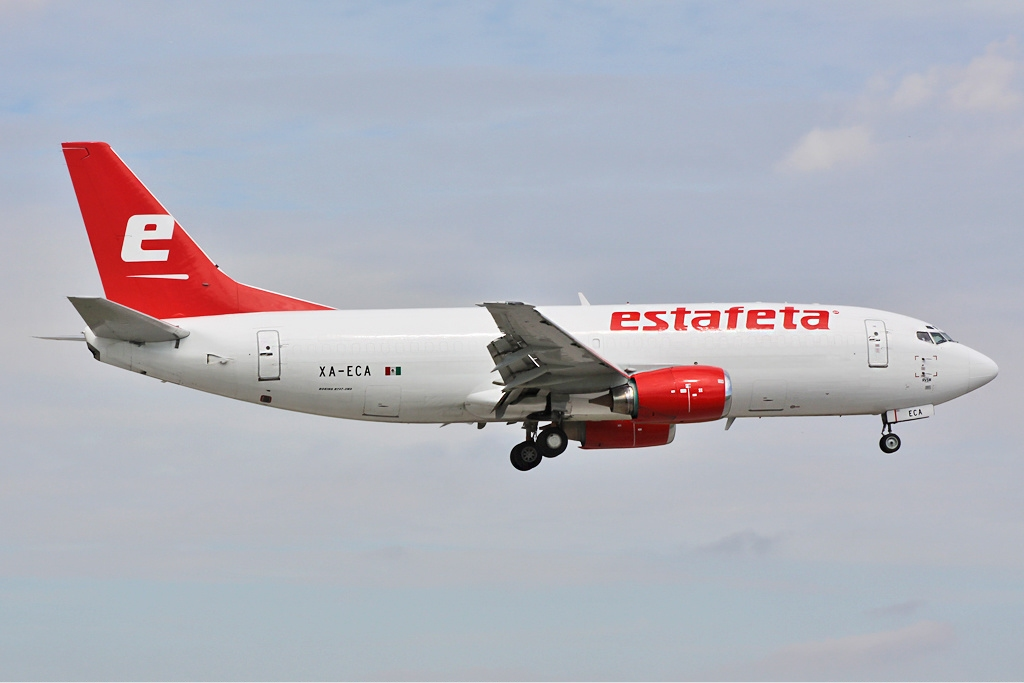
Estafeta Boeing 737-300F

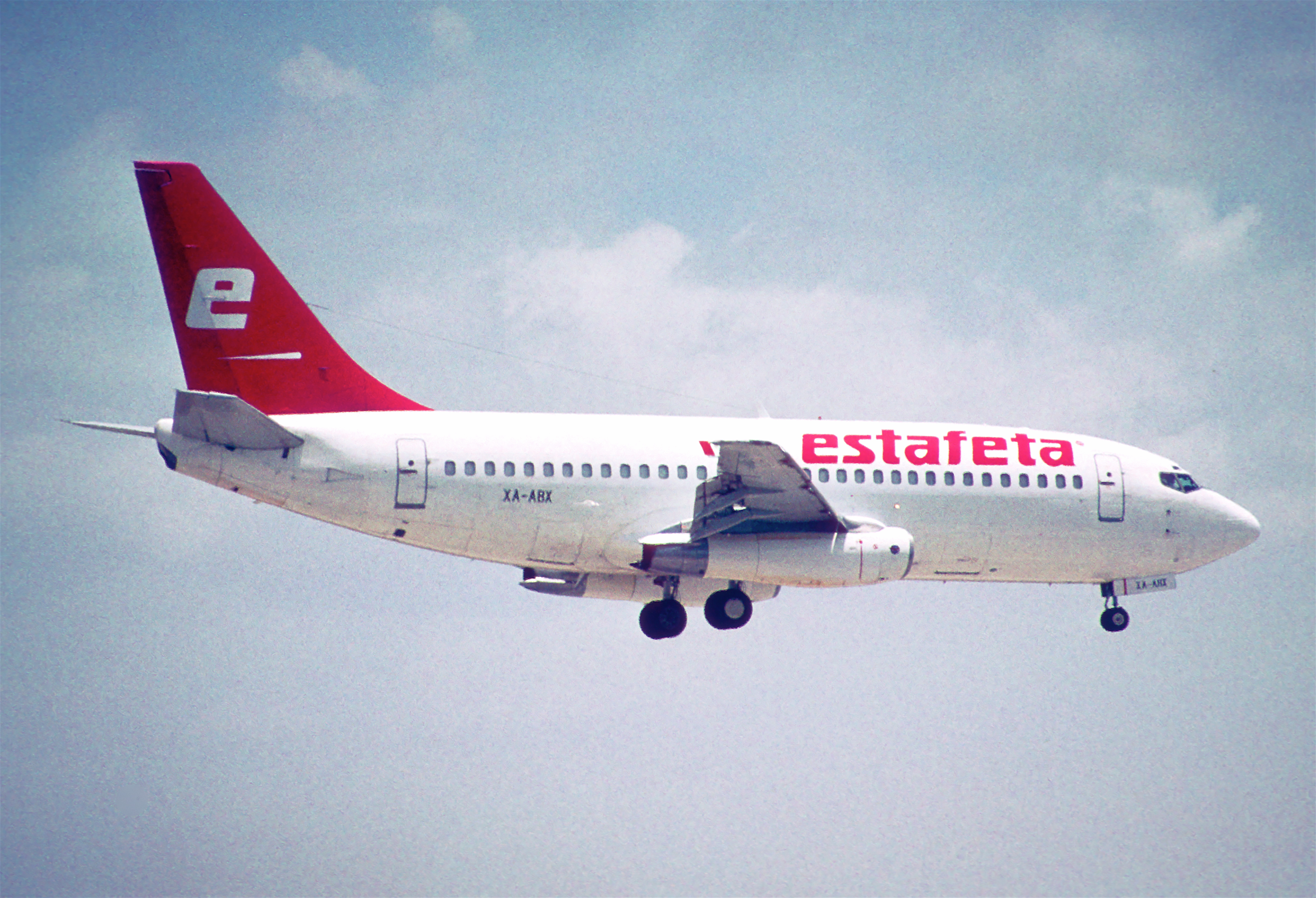
A former Estafeta Boeing 737-200F in 2007.

In 2004 Estafeta Carga Aerea introduced their Boeing 737-300F to be the first cargo flight starting in March 1, 2004. XA-UDQ Was entered in 2004.Estafeta Carga Aerea's First Boeing 737-300F was indeed In March 1, 2004

=== Current fleet ===
As of August 2025, Estafeta Carga Aérea operates the following aircraft:

Aircraft	In service	Orders	Notes
Boeing 737-400BDSF	2	—	
Boeing 737-400SF	4	—	
Total	6	—	

=== Historic Fleet ===
The airline had the following historic fleet:

Aircraft	Total	Introduced	Retired	Notes
Boeing 737-200F	4	2000	2007	
Boeing 737-300F	6	2004	2021	
Bombardier CRJ100ERF	2	2008	2021	

== See also ==
- List of active mexican airlines
- Lists of airlines
