= Grupo Senda =

Mexican bus company

Grupo Senda Autotransporte, S.A. de C.V.
- Type: Sociedad Anónima Bursátil de Capital Variable
- Industry: Bus Transportation
- Founded: 1930
- Headquarters: Monterrey, Mexico
- Key people: Ricardo Clausse Torres
- Number of employees: 7,500
- Website: Grupo Senda

Grupo Senda is a private bus and coach operator providing services mainly in the northwest and centre of Mexico, as well as the United States through its subsidiary Turimex Internacional. The company also offers school bus services, parcel delivery services and courier services.

== History ==
The company was founded in 1934 as "Transportes Tamaulipas" by Don Protasio Rodríguez Cuellar in Linares, Nuevo León, Mexico and originally offered routes between Villa Mainero in Tamaulipas and Linares.

The original vehicle was a truck to which Protasio Rodríguez fitted wooden planks and could carry up to 16 passengers. In 1937, Protasio Rodríguez collected together a number of transport companies under the name "Transportes Aztecas" but he ended his relationship with this collection of companies and reverted to operating under the original name. In 1955, Grupo Senda became the new name for the company and in 2004 it acquired "Transportes del Norte", a company that specialised in transport for the tourism industry. Today, the company operates a number of different subsidiaries including del Norte, Transportes del Norte Diamante, Turimex Internacional, Coahuilenses, Tamaulipas and Sendor. It also operates Senda Citi for school transportation.

In 2017, an analysis of the company's performance by HR Ratings de México noted that although total sales had increased, it was expected that the company would restructure its debt. It noted that a new strategy by the company to increase the load factor per route, that is, more passengers per vehicle but less frequency of service on each route, had negatively effected the company's ability to service its debt. In July 2018, the company requested to be declared commercially insolvent, however the petition was dismissed by the courts. In 2019, their creditors filed a petition to declare the company insolvent and although their petition was initially dismissed, a court of appeal overturned the original decision. In 2022 the company announced it had reached an agreement with the majority of its creditors which allowed it to restructure over 3.6 billion pesos over a period of 8 years and a possible capitalization of debt with conditions to ensure continued operations.

== Description ==
As of 2023, the company operates more than 2,450 vehicles and carries more than 80 million passengers annually.

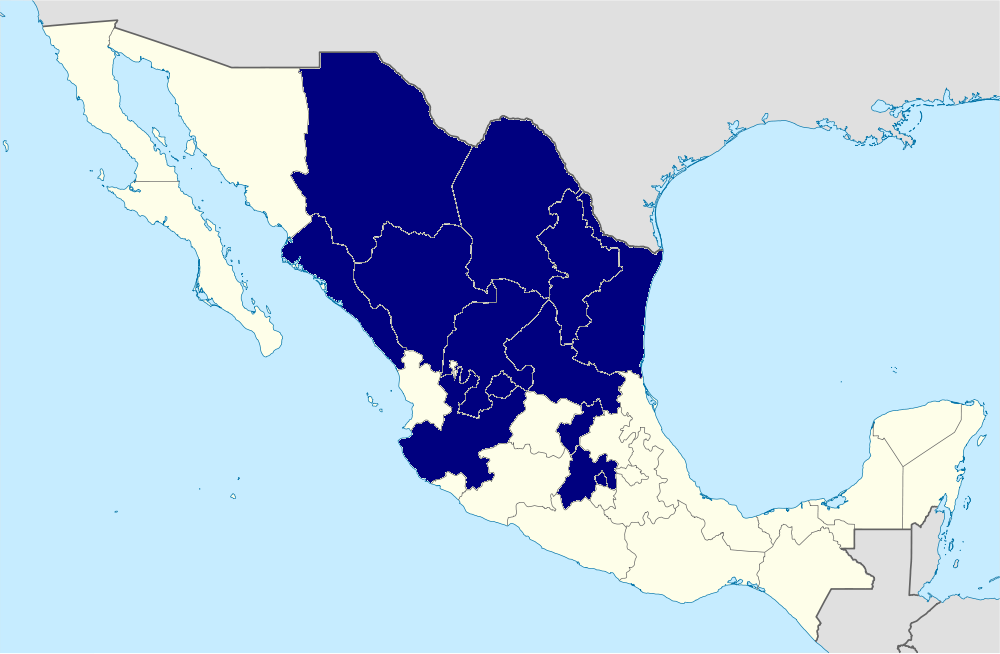
Destinations of Grupo Senda in Mexico

The company operates in 12 states in Mexico.

Routes - Mexico
State	City
Aguascalientes	Aguascalientes
Chihuahua	Chihuahua, Ciudad Juárez, Delicias, Jiménez, Parral
Mexico City	Mexico City
Coahuila	Ciudad Acuña, Cautro Ciénegas, Monclova, Muzquiz, Nava, Nueva Rosita, Piedras Negras, Sabinas, Saltillo, Torreón
Durango	Durango, Gómez Palacio
Jalisco	Guadalajara, Lagos de Moreno, San Juan de los Lagos
Nuevo León	Bustamante, China, Linares, Montemorelos, Monterrey
Querétaro	Querétaro
San Luis Potosí	Ciudad Valles, Matehuala, Real de Catorce, San Luis Potosí, Tamazunchale
Sinaloa	Mazatlán
Tamaulipas	Ciudad Mante, Ciudad Victoria, Matamoros, Nuevo Laredo, Reynosa, Tampico
Zacatecas	Zacatecas

Through its wholly owned subsidiary, the company operates in a further 12 states in the United States.

Routes - United States
State	City
Alabama	Birmingham, Montgomery, Tuscaloosa
Arkansas	Little Rock
Georgia	Atlanta, Dalto, Fort Valley, Gainesville, Roswell
Illinois	Chicago, Kankakee
Kansas	Wichita
Louisiana	Baton Rouge, Lafayette
Mississippi	Biloxi, Forest, Pearl
North Carolina	Charlotte, Concord, Durham, Gastonia, Greensboro, Raleigh, Salisbury, Sanford, Winston-Salem
Oklahoma	Oklahoma, Tulsa
South Carolina	Anderson, Gaffney, Newberry, Spartanburg
Tennessee	Chattanooga, Cleveland, Memphis
Texas	Arlington, Austin, Dallas, Eagle Pass, Fort Worth, Houston, Laredo, McAllen, San Antonio, Waco

== Urban anthropology studies of Hispanic-oriented migration ==
Studies of Hispanic transportation services to and from central Mexico show that more than 50 firms compete for customers and the industry has become more regulated and competitive. Turimex, a wholly owned subsidiary, focuses almost entirely on this market with large terminals in five cities in Texas and with a first-class service to and from Mexico since 2003. Turimex originally started with only 3 buses covering 2 main routes and by 2008 operated 54 buses covering 12 routes and acquired several other smaller bus companies in this time.
