= San Luis Potosí International Airport =

International Airport in San Luis Potosí, Mexico

Ponciano Arriaga International Airport Aeropuerto Internacional Ponciano Arriaga
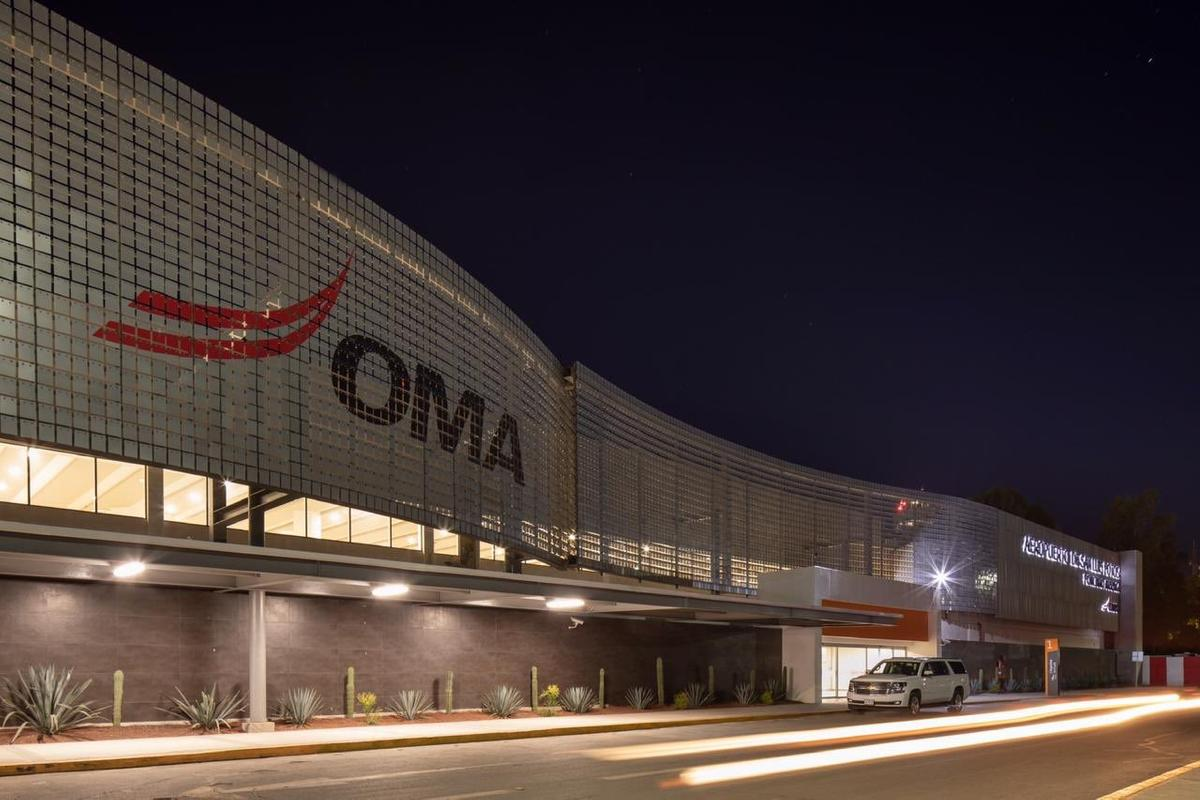
- IATA: SLP; ICAO: MMSP

Summary
- Airport type: Public
- Owner/Operator: Grupo Aeroportuario Centro Norte
- Serves: San Luis Potosí, San Luis Potosí, Mexico
- Hub for: Estafeta Carga Aérea
- Time zone: CST (UTC−06:00)
- Elevation AMSL: 1,839 m (6,033 ft)
- Coordinates: 22°15′16″N 100°55′51″W
- Website: www.oma.aero/en/passengers/san-luis-potosi/index.php

Map
- Location of the airport in San Luis Potosí SLP (Mexico)

Runways
Direction	Length		Surface
Direction	m	ft	Surface
04/22	993	3,258	Asphalt
14/32	3,007	9,867	Asphalt

Statistics (2025)
- Total passengers: 834,795
- Ranking in Mexico: 30th ▲1
- Source: Grupo Aeroportuario Centro Norte

San Luis Potosí International Airport, (Spanish: Aeropuerto Internacional de San Luis Potosí); officially Aeropuerto Internacional Ponciano Arriaga (Ponciano Arriaga International Airport) (IATA: SLP, ICAO: MMSP) is an international airport located in the municipality of San Luis Potosí, within the state of San Luis Potosí, Mexico. It serves the Greater San Luis Potosi Metropolitan Area. In addition to national and international passenger traffic, San Luis Potosí Airport accommodates logistics and courier companies as well as industries involved in auto parts, steel, textiles, and furniture. Since 2005 it has served as the cargo airline Estafeta's main hub.

Grupo Aeroportuario Centro Norte (OMA) is the operator of the airport. It was named after Ponciano Arriaga, a Mexican constitutional lawyer from San Luis Potosí who supported the government of Benito Juárez. As of 2025, SLP is the 9th busiest airport in Mexico for cargo traffic, and it served 736,386 passengers during 2024 and 834,795 passengers during 2025, as indicated by data published by its owner and operator.

== Facilities ==
The airport features a primary runway designated as 14/32, measuring 3,007 metres (9,865 ft) in length. Additionally, there is a smaller runway, 04/22, with a length of 993 metres (3,258 ft), primarily used for general aviation and with limited utilization. Estafeta, a cargo airline, manages numerous daily domestic cargo flights from its dedicated cargo facilities located to the north of the passenger terminal. The commercial aviation apron features five narrowbody aircraft parking positions.

The airport features a single terminal that caters for both domestic and international flights. The terminal building contains a check-in hall, a common baggage claim hall, a large retail area with food and retail outlets as well as waiting areas located on the ground floor. The upper level contains a security area and a departure concourse with a VIP Lounge and five gates, one of which has a jetbridge. The terminal can accommodate up to 300 people.

== Airlines and destinations ==
=== Passenger ===
Airlines	Destinations
Aeroméxico	Mexico City–Benito Juárez
Aeroméxico Connect	Mexico City–Benito Juárez
Aerus	Mexico City–Felipe Ángeles, Monterrey
American Airlines	Dallas/Fort Worth
United Airlines	Houston–Intercontinental
United Express	Houston–Intercontinental
Viva	Mexico City–Felipe Ángeles, Monterrey
Volaris	Cancún, Chicago–Midway, Dallas/Fort Worth, Guadalajara, Houston–Intercontinental, Monterrey, Puerto Vallarta, Queretaro, San Antonio, Tijuana

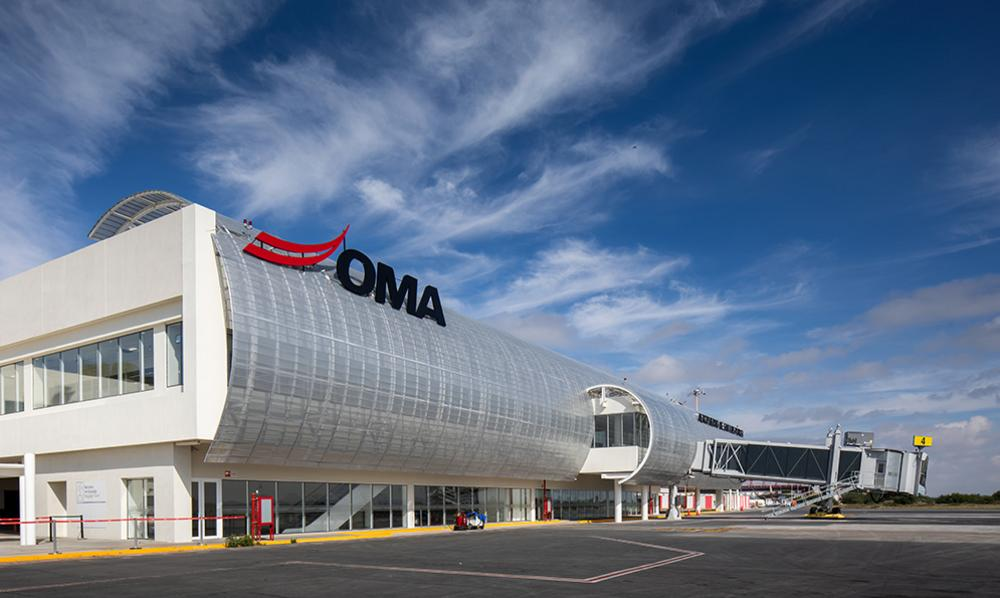
Passenger terminal airside

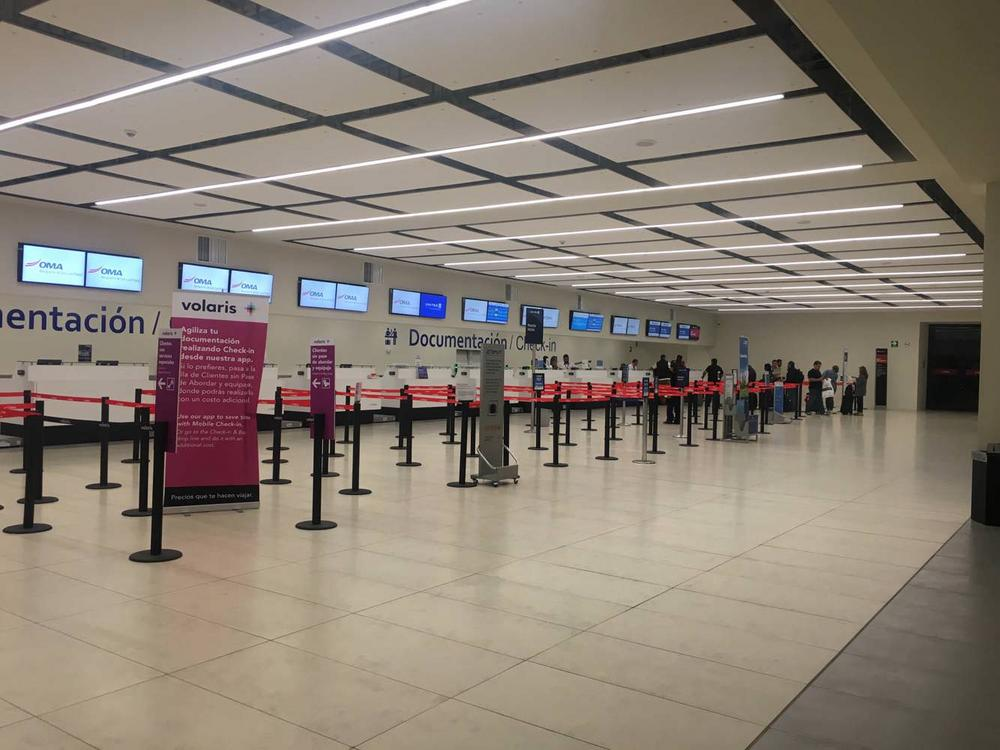
Check-in area

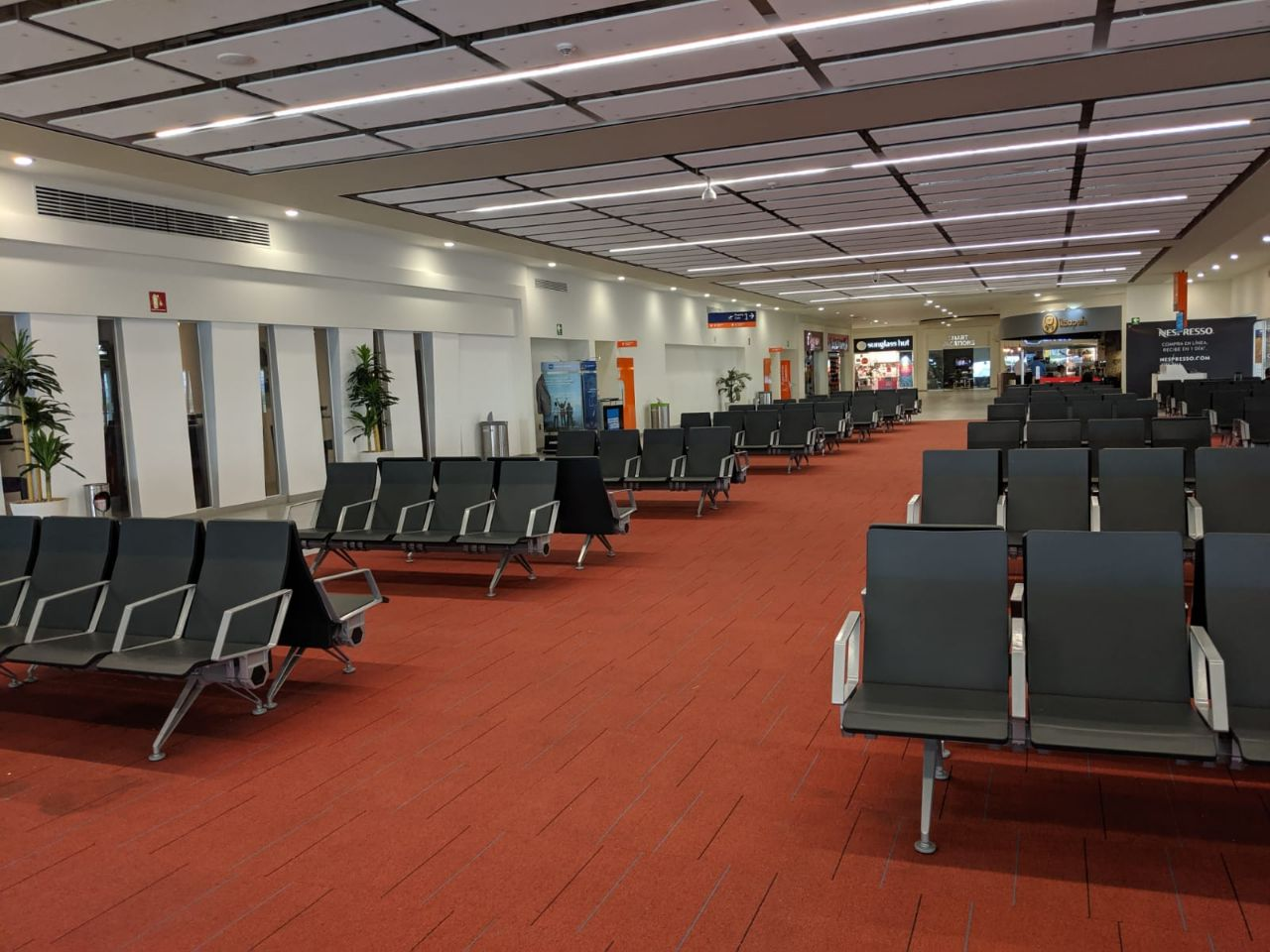
Terminal concourse

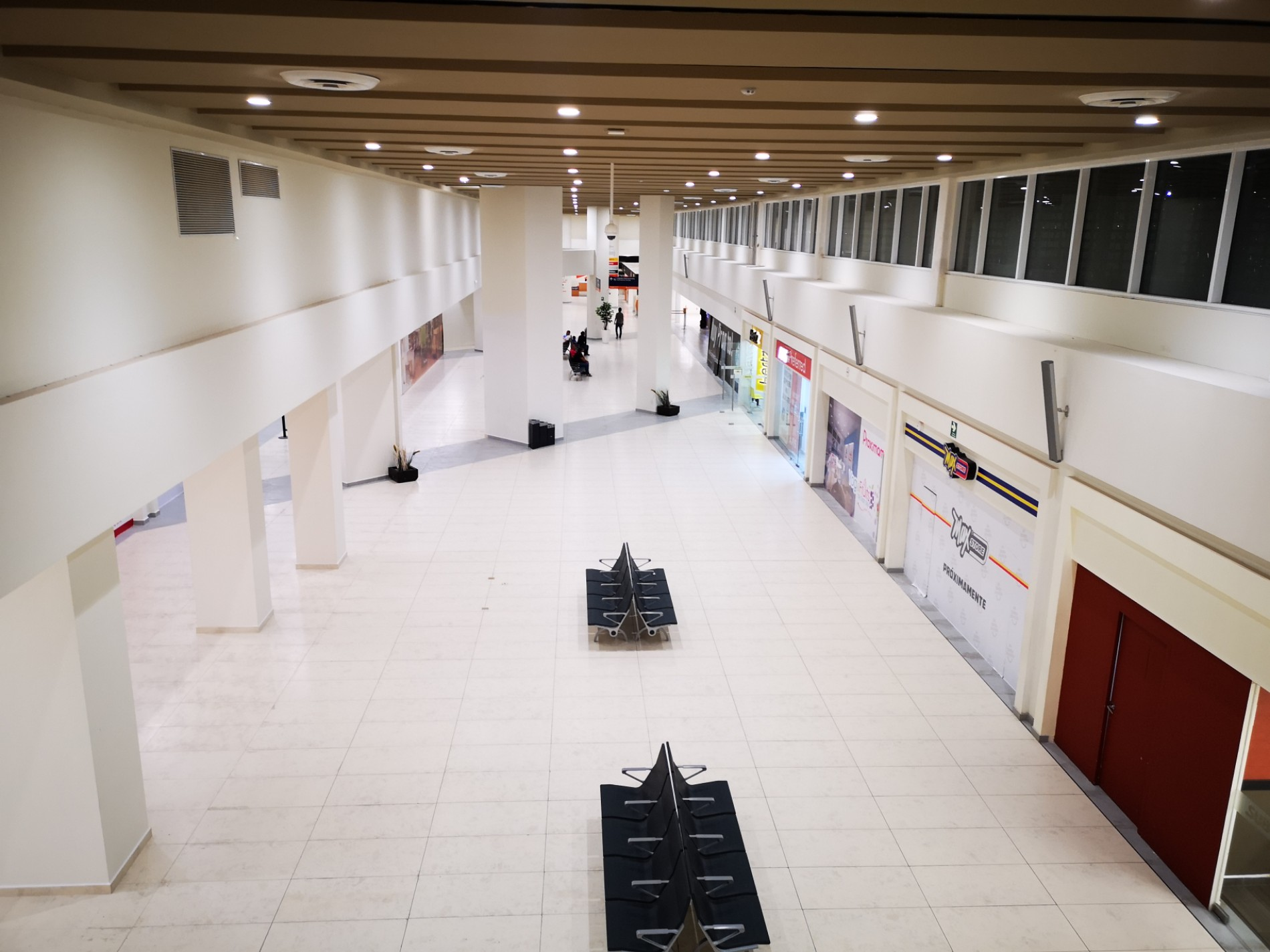
Arrivals hall

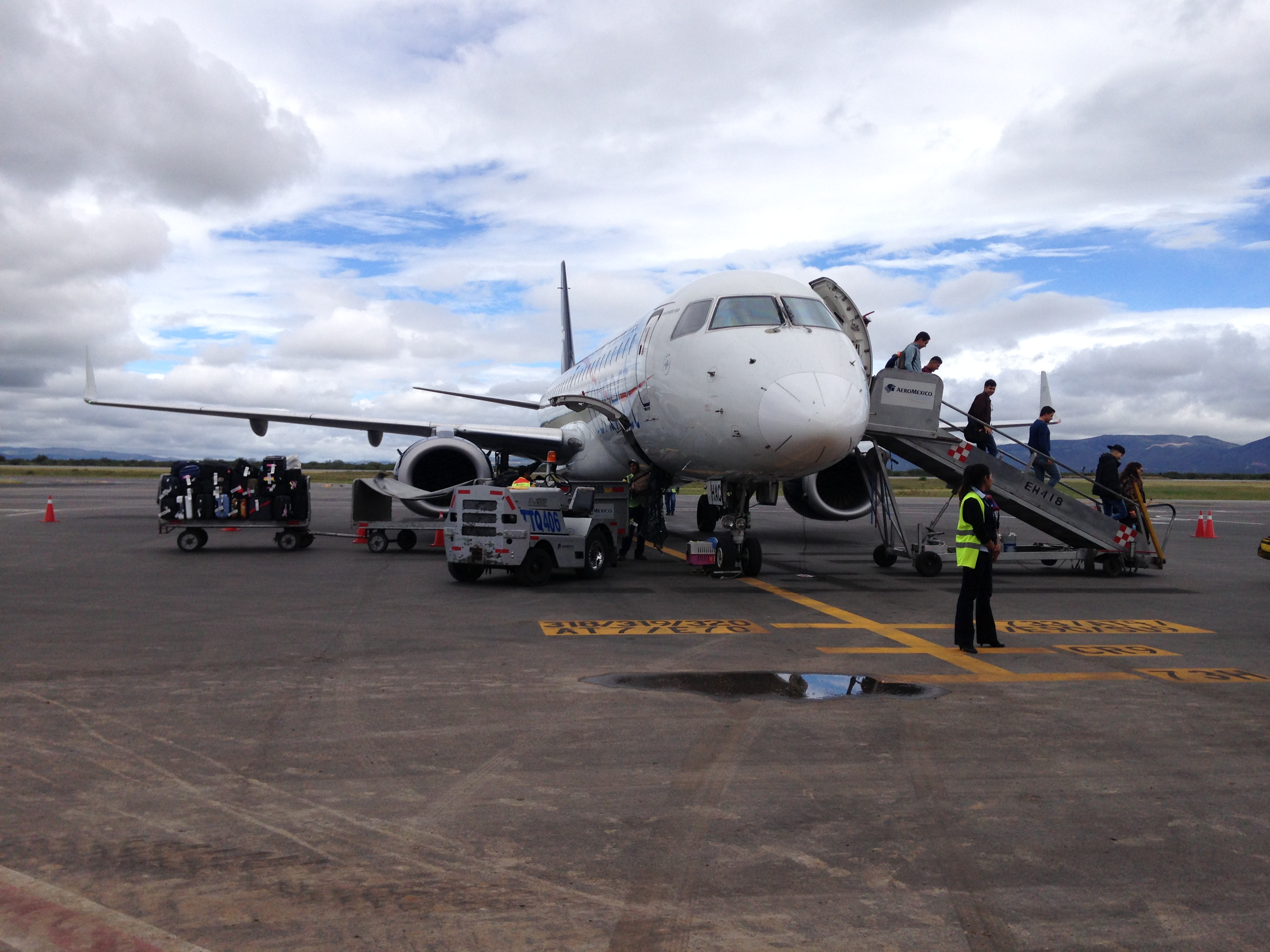
Aeromexico Connect Embraer E190 at SLP

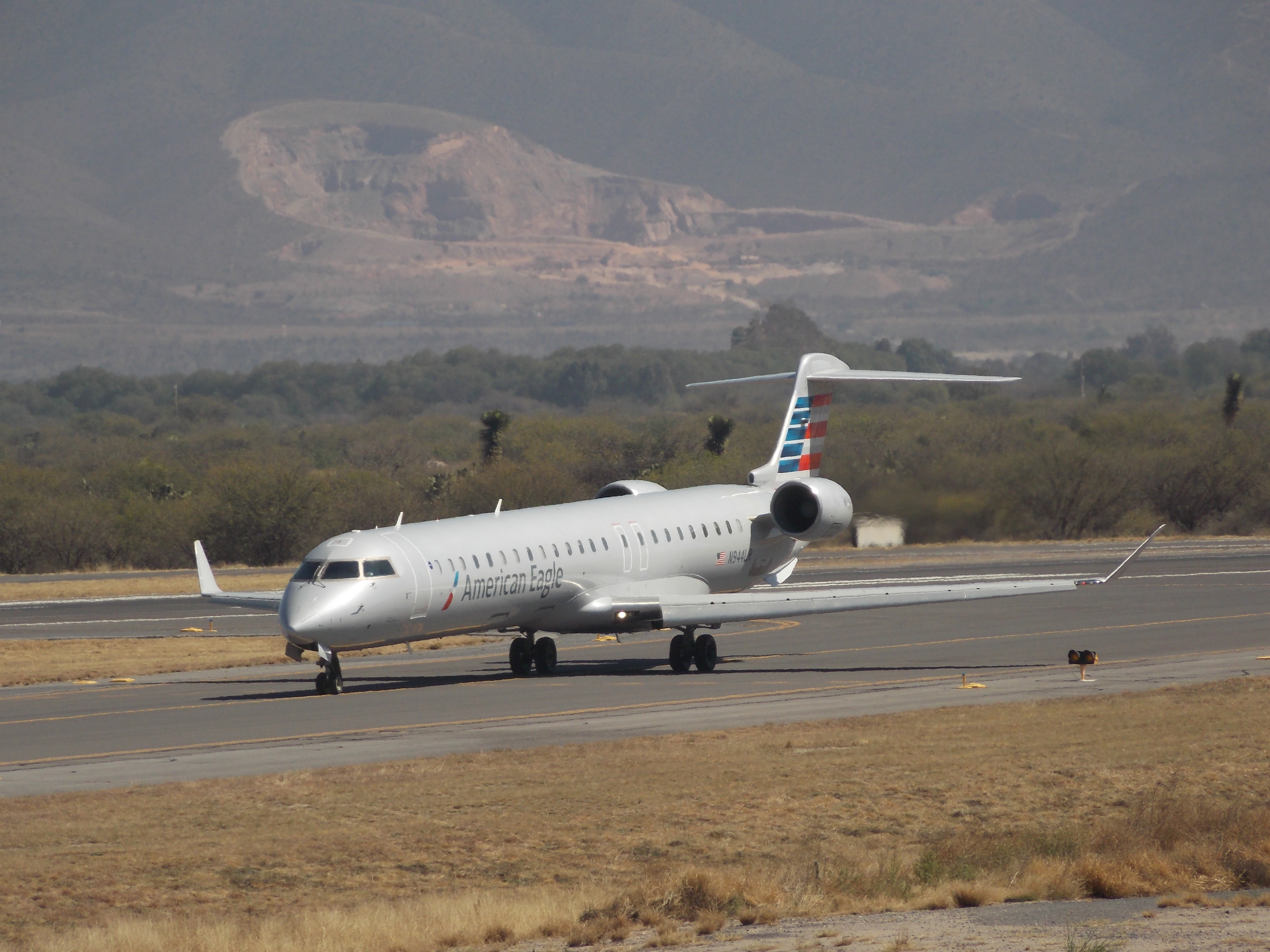
American Eagle CRJ-900 at SLP

=== Destinations map ===
Domestic destinations from San Luis Potosí International Airport
Red = Year-round destination
Blue = Future destination
Green = Seasonal destination
International destinations from San Luis Potosí International Airport
Red = Year-round destination
Blue = Future destination
Green = Seasonal/charter destination

== Statistics ==
=== Annual Traffic ===
Passenger statistics at SLP
Year	Total Passengers	change %
2008	261,049	Steady
2009	206,500	▼20.90%
2010	222,854	▲7.92%
2011	248,645	▲11.58%
2012	271,107	▲9.03%
2013	261,699	▼3.47%
2014	373,986	▲42.92%
2015	444,469	▲18.85%
2016	504,313	▲13.46%
2017	553,353	▲9.72%
2018	626,512	▲13.23%
2019	643,224	▲2.67%
2020	309,311	▼51.89%
2021	528,625	▲70.90%
2022	633,364	▲19.82%
2023	718,639	▲13.46%
2024	736,386	▲2.47%
2025	834,795	▲13.37%

=== Busiest routes ===
Busiest routes from SLP (Jan–Dec 2025)
Rank	Airport	Passengers
1	Mexico City, Mexico City	148,183
2	Dallas/Fort Worth, United States	73,773
3	Cancún, Quintana Roo	53,618
4	Houston–Intercontinental, United States	52,262
5	Tijuana, Baja California	36,997
6	Atlanta, United States	13,887
7	Monterrey, Nuevo León	10,318
8	San Antonio, United States	5,509
9	Puerto Vallarta, Jalisco	2,925
10	Mexico City–AIFA, State of Mexico	1,729

== Incidents and accidents ==
- On November 4, 2008, former Secretary of the interior Juan Camilo Mouriño was killed when the SEGOB-owned Learjet he was travelling in on his way back from San Luis Potosí crashed at Mexico City before reaching the airport.

== See also ==
- List of the busiest airports in Mexico
- List of airports in Mexico
- List of airports by ICAO code: M
- List of busiest airports in North America
- List of the busiest airports in Latin America
- Transportation in Mexico
- Tourism in Mexico
- Grupo Aeroportuario Centro Norte
- Automotive industry in Mexico
- San Luis Potosí
