= Volaris =

Mexican low-cost airline

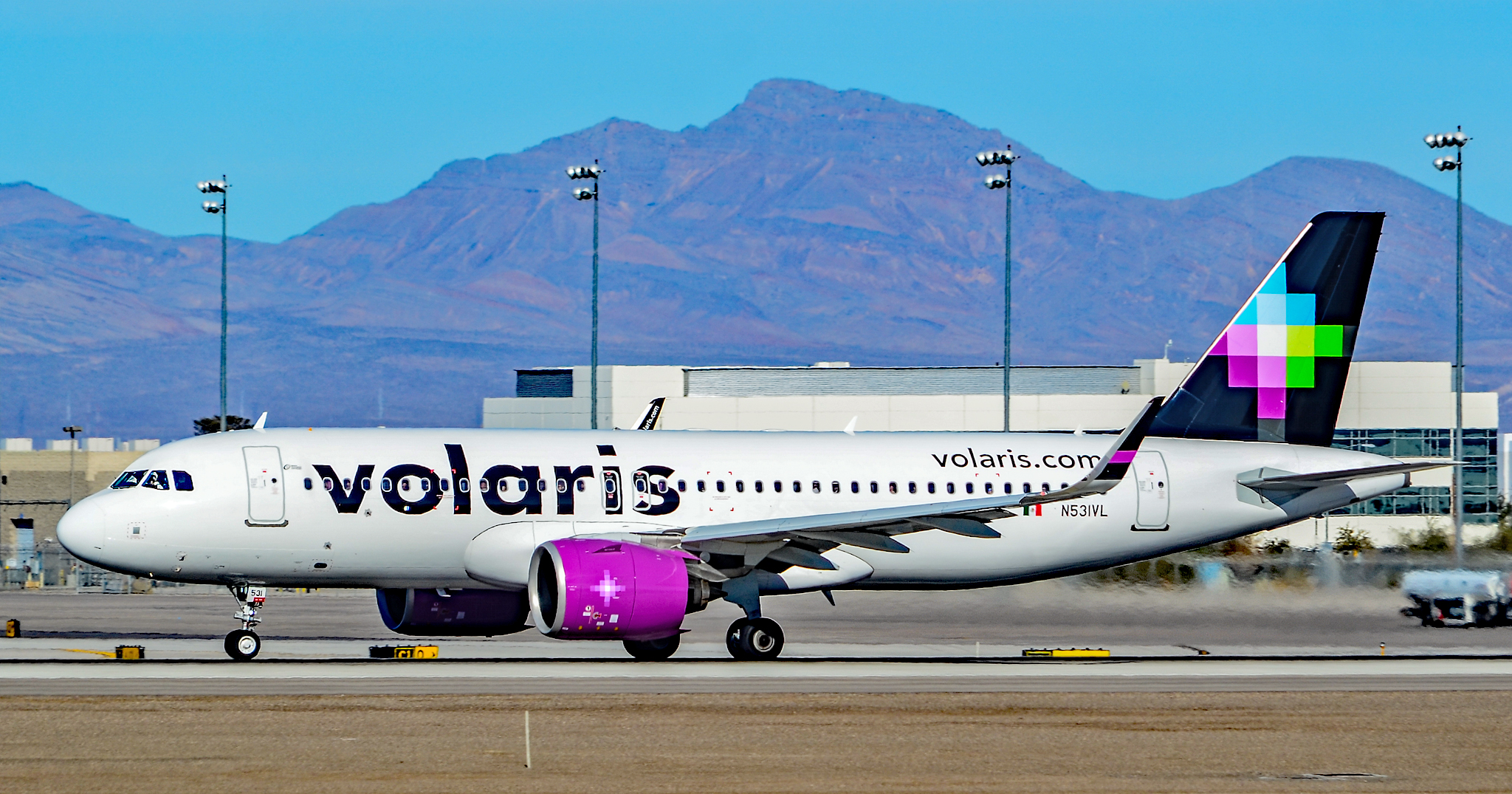
- Volaris Airbus A320neo
IATA	ICAO	Call sign
Y4	VOI	VOLARIS
- Founded: August 2005; 21 years ago
- Commenced operations: 13 March 2006; 20 years ago
- AOC #: Z5XF131F
- Operating bases: Cancún; Culiacán; Guadalajara; León/Del Bajío; Mexicali; Mexico City; Monterrey; Tijuana
- Frequent-flyer program: altitude
- Subsidiaries: Volaris Costa Rica; Volaris El Salvador
- Fleet size: 145
- Destinations: 69
- Parent company: Vuela Compañia de Aviación
- Traded as: BMV: VOLAR; NYSE: VLRS
- Headquarters: Santa Fe, Álvaro Obregón, Mexico City, Mexico
- Key people: Enrique Beltranena (CEO)
- Revenue: ▼US$1,282 million (2025)
- Operating income: ▼US$135 million (2025)
- Net income: ▲US$(104) million (2025)
- Total assets: ▲US$1,393 million (2025)
- Total equity: ▼US$264 million (2025)
- Employees: 7,198 (2023)
- Website: volaris.com

Concesionaria Vuela Compañía de Aviación S.A.B. de C.V., operating as Volaris, is a Mexican ultra low-cost airline based in Santa Fe, Álvaro Obregón, Mexico City, with its operating bases in Cancún, Culiacán, Guadalajara, León/Del Bajío, Mexicali, Mexico City, Monterrey, and Tijuana. It is Mexico's largest airline by transported passengers and serves domestic and international destinations within the Americas. It is the leading airline in the Mexican domestic airline market with a market share of 42%.

== History ==
The pre-operations phase, the founding of the legal entities and setting up of the required infrastructure, started in August 2005 under the name Vuela Airlines. The idea for the airline was formed from the proposed "Vuelamex" project. Major initial shareholders of the company were Grupo Televisa (the world's biggest Spanish-language media conglomerate), Inbursa (an insurance company owned by multi-billionaire Carlos Slim), TACA Airlines, and the Discovery Americas Fund. Each of these partners invested 25% of the initial cost of activities, or 100 million USD.

In July 2010, it was announced that Televisa and Inbursa had sold their stake in Volaris, leaving the ownership of Volaris as follows: TACA Airlines with Roberto and Maria Cristina Kriete (50%), Investment fund Discovery Americas (over 25%), and Indigo Partners: Fund led by former America West CEO Bill Franke.

Ticket sales started in January 2006. Following the delivery of the airline's first aircraft, the first non-commercial flight was operated in February 2006. Scheduled revenue flights were launched on March 13, 2006, with the inaugural flight being between Toluca and Tijuana.

Volaris began service to Mexico City in September 2010 after absorbing flight routes from two defunct Mexican airlines, Aerocalifornia and Mexicana. In March 2011, the airline announced that its hub in Toluca would move to Guadalajara.

In June 2012, the airline launched a frequent flyer program called VClub. In June 2012, PayPal became a payment alternative for the airline, enabling customers to purchase tickets directly from the airline's website. In September 2012, Volaris announced a codeshare partnership with a German airline, Condor. Passengers of Condor are able to fly to more international destinations.

On March 13, 2013, the airline celebrated its seventh anniversary, offering passengers 70% off all flights, and has done this every year since then. Volaris announced the creation of a subsidiary, Volaris Costa Rica, in March 2016. The subsidiary, based at Juan Santamaría International Airport in the Costa Rican capital of San José, started operations in November 2016.

As of 2022, Volaris has faced multiple class-action lawsuits due to failure to properly refund flights canceled due to the COVID-19 pandemic.

In December 2025, Volaris and competitor Viva have signed an agreement to form a holding company, creating the largest low-cost airline group in Mexico. The deal aims to lower fleet costs, while both airlines would maintain their brands.

In 2025, Mexico's Federal Civil Aviation Agency (AFAC) authorized Volaris to operate 10 aircraft with foreign pilots between December 1, 2025, and January 12, 2026; the Association of Airline Pilots of Mexico (ASPA) claim the decision breaches Mexico's Constitution and Civil Aviation Law.

== International operations ==
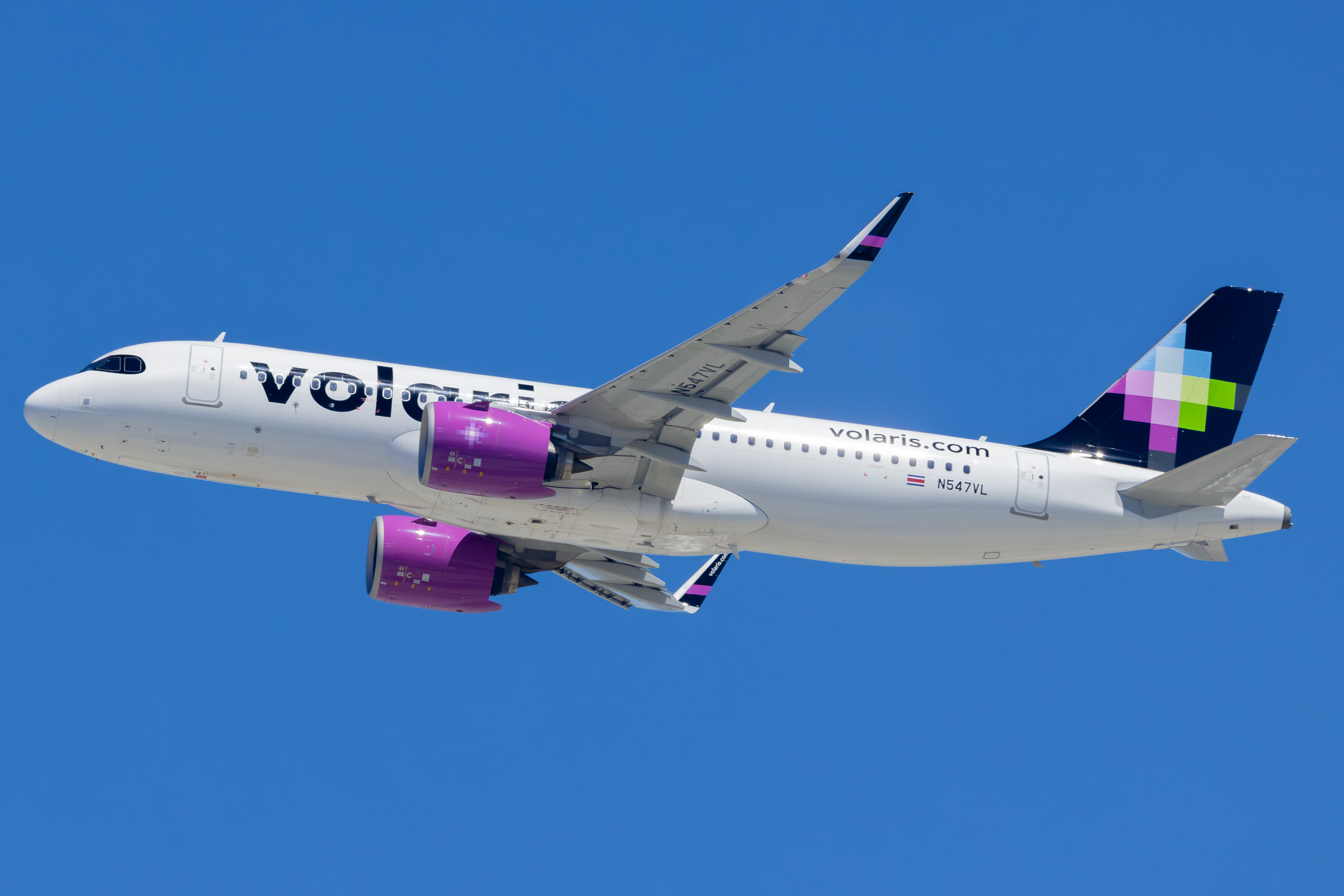
An Airbus A320neo of Volaris Costa Rica

In November 2008, Volaris announced a codeshare agreement with U.S.-based low-cost carrier Southwest Airlines. In April 2009, Volaris announced the start of U.S.-bound flights out of Toluca and Guadalajara (initially to Los Angeles and Oakland) to feed into the hubs of Southwest Airlines. After Mexicana de Aviación's shutdown, Volaris took over many of Mexicana's international destinations and flights from its focus city, Guadalajara. The airline began using Guadalajara International Airport as an American gateway hub in late 2011.

In February 2013, Volaris and Southwest stopped codesharing. Southwest decided to focus more on the Mexican market with AirTran Airways, instead of codesharing with Volaris. In January 2018, Volaris announced a codeshare agreement with American low-cost carrier Frontier Airlines.

In June 2018, after Donald Trump signed an order ending the family separation policy, Volaris announced that they would offer free flights for children to reunite with family members who had been deported.

== Corporate affairs ==
=== Business trends ===
The key trends for Volaris are (as of the financial year ending 31 December):

	Revenue (US$ m)	Net income (US$ m)	Number of employees	Number of passengers (m)	Passenger load factor (%)	Number of routes	Fleet size	References
2013	994	20	2,692	8.9	82.6	80	44	
2014	954	41	2,805	9.8	82.2	130	50	
2015	1,057	143	3,304	11.9	82.3	143	56	
2016	1,138	170	4,550	15.0	85.8	164	69	
2017	1,259	−30	4,916	16.4	84.4	174	71	
2018	1,387	−35	4,600	18.4	84.5	187	77	
2019	1,844	140	4,950	21.9	85.9	190	82	
2020	1,111	−191	4,846	14.7	79.9	209	86	
2021	2,170	106	6,714	24.4	84.7	183	101	
2022	2,847	−80.2	7,364	31.0	85.6	197	117	
2023	3,259	7.8	7,198	33.5	86.0	211	129	

=== Headquarters ===
The airline is headquartered in Santa Fe, Álvaro Obregón, Mexico City. It formerly had its headquarters on the first floor of Prolongación Paseo de la Reforma 490 in Peña Blanca, Santa Fe.

=== Services ===
Volaris cabins are configured in a single class, high density layout.

Volaris does not provide complimentary meals or drinks on its flights. Passengers may purchase items on board from the "Entre nubes" buy on board program. Onboard sales are an important part of the airline's ancillary revenue. Items such as snacks, pillows, blankets and Volaris-branded items are sold on board. Volaris' monthly inflight magazine is called "V de Volaris".

The airline had previously provided in-flight entertainment (IFE) in most aircraft, utilizing drop-down screens on its Airbus aircraft. By 2019, all use of IFE had been discontinued.

=== Frequent flyer program ===
VClub is Volaris' frequent flyer program. It gives members exclusive deals on flights, baggage and packages. The airline offers individual and group memberships, with the option to pay monthly or annually. Volaris offers VPass, similar to Spirit's "$9 Fare Club". It offers a set subscription price, and charges customers only for taxes and additional services. Customers can book codeshare flights and earn points through fellow ultra-low-cost carrier, Frontier Airlines.

=== Corporate identity ===
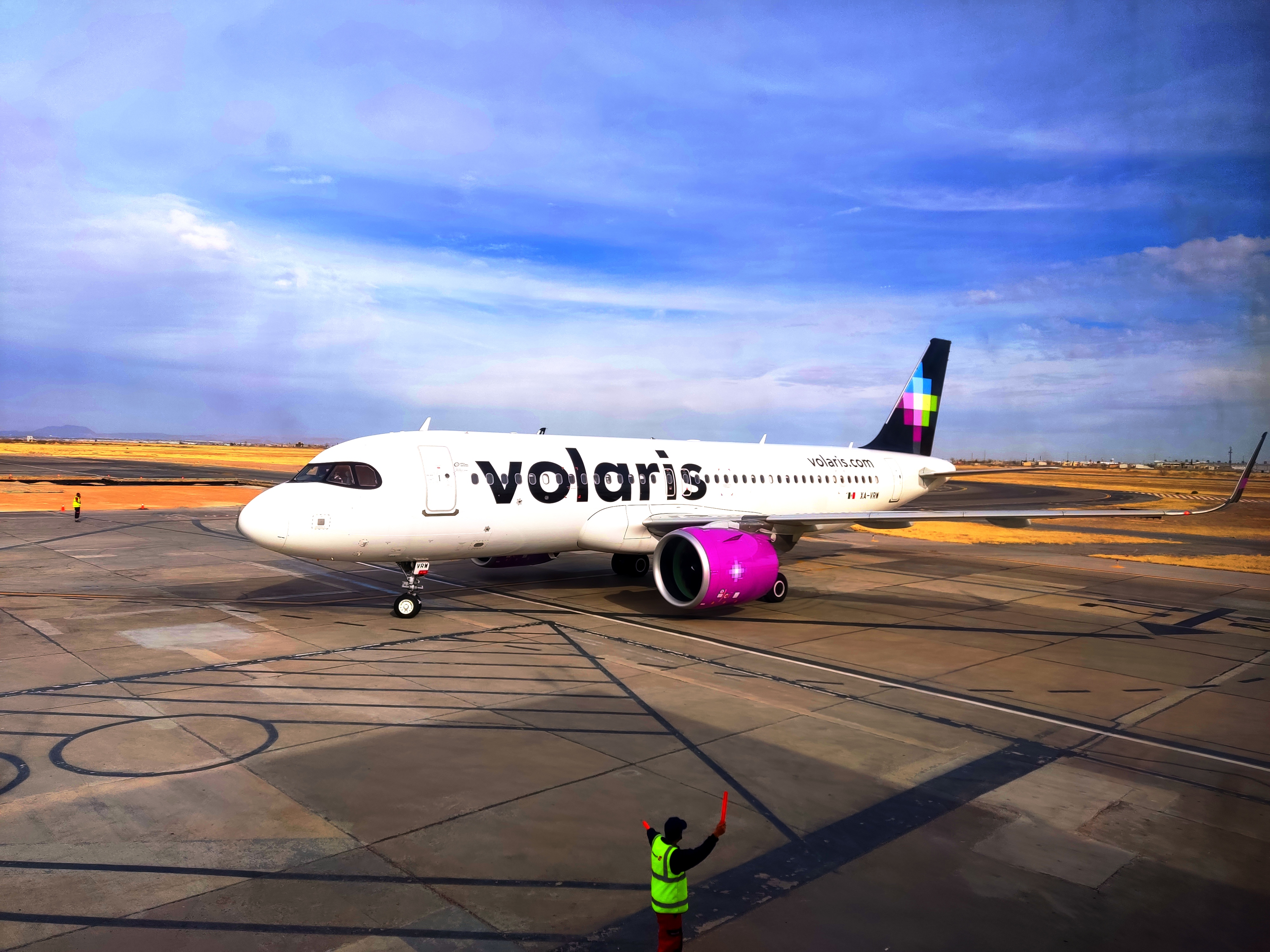
New billboard-style livery of the airline introduced in September 2017

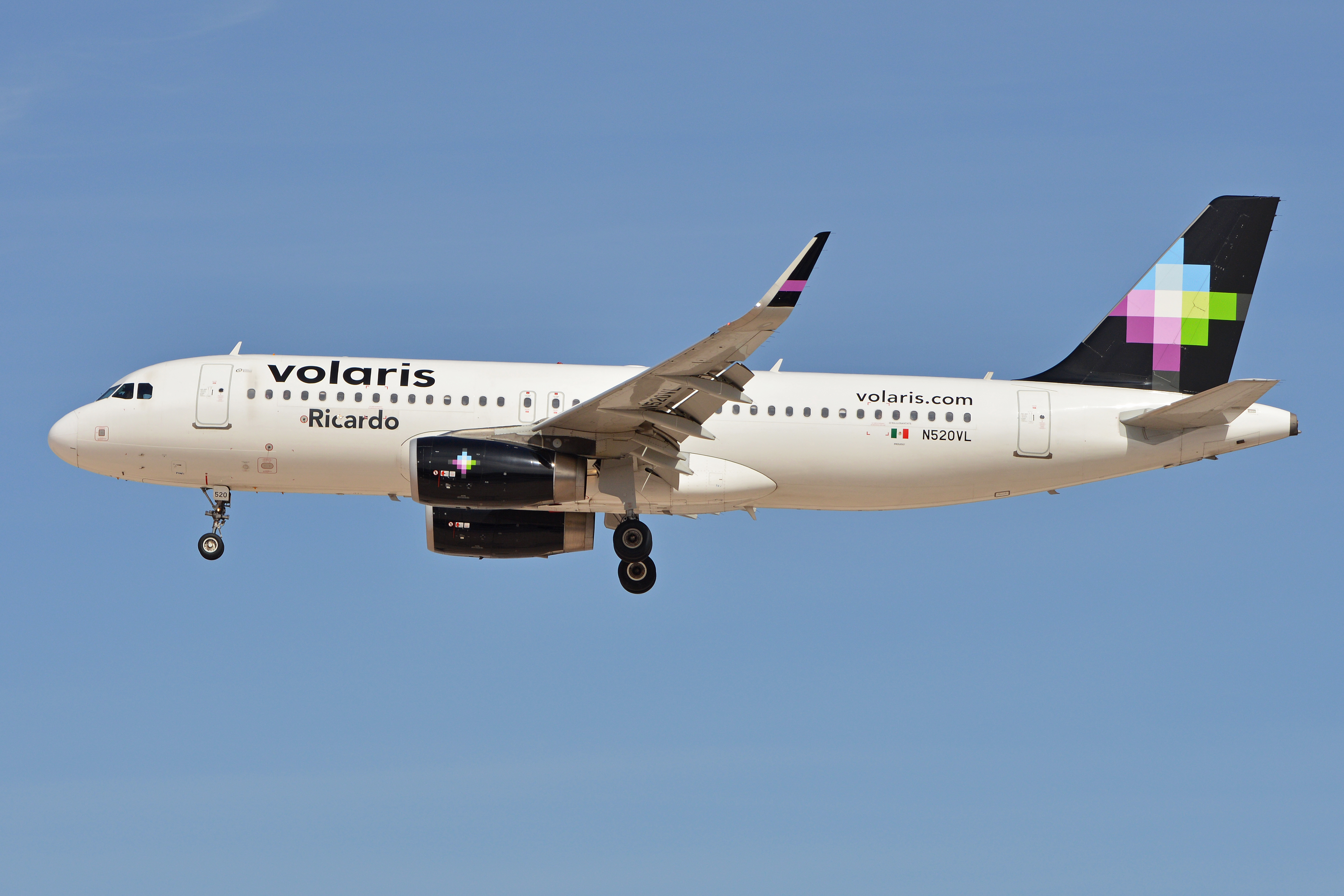
Volaris Airbus A320-200 in its former livery version

==== Brand image ====
The Volaris logo, since its launch in 2005, has been a colorful, pixelated star against a black background. It represents the north star, Polaris, from which the airline's name is derived.

==== Advertising slogans ====
Volaris has used several slogans over the years:

- 2005–2008 – "Lo quieres, lo tienes" (You want it, you got it.)
- 2008–2012 – "Vive viajando" (Live travelling)
- 2013–2017 – "Tu decides" (You decide). Launched after the introduction of the "clean fare", which no longer included the cost of food, baggage, or seat selection in the airline's ticket prices.
- 2015 – "Queremos que todo el mundo vuele" (We want the whole world to fly)
- 2015–present – "Precios que te hacen viajar" (Prices that make you travel)
- 2016 – "Avión a precio de camión" (The plane at the price of a bus)
- November 2018–present – "Don't just fly, vuela"

== Destinations ==
Countries in which Volaris operates as of May 2026

Volaris operates scheduled flights to Mexico and elsewhere in the Americas from its hubs at Guadalajara International Airport in Guadalajara, Mexico City International Airport in Mexico City, and Tijuana International Airport in Tijuana. Focus cities include Cancún International Airport in Cancún, Bajío International Airport in León, and Monterrey International Airport in Monterrey.

=== Operating bases ===
Volaris operates crew bases at the following airports:

- Cancún
- Culiacán
- Guadalajara
- León/Del Bajío
- Mexico City
- Monterrey
- Morelia
- Tijuana

=== Codeshare agreements ===
Volaris codeshares with the following airlines:

- Copa Airlines
- Frontier Airlines
- Hainan Airlines
- Iberia
- Turkish Airlines

=== Interline agreements ===
- Condor

== Fleet ==
=== Current fleet ===
As of October 2025, Volaris operates an all-Airbus A320 family fleet composed of the following aircraft:

Volaris fleet
Aircraft	In service	Orders	Passengers	Notes
Airbus A320-200	44	—	174	
Airbus A320-200	44	—	179	
Airbus A320-200	44	—	180	
Airbus A320neo	56	18	186	
Airbus A321-200	10	—	220	
Airbus A321-200	10	—	230	
Airbus A321neo	37	103	230	
Airbus A321neo	37	103	239	
Total	147	121		

=== Fleet development ===
- Volaris became the first North American operator of the Airbus A320neo aircraft in September 2016.
- In November 2017, during the Dubai Airshow, Indigo Partners announced an order for 430 aircraft of the Airbus A320neo family of which 80 will be for Volaris as follows: 46 Airbus A320neo aircraft and 34 Airbus A321neo aircraft.
- In November 2021 during the Dubai Airshow, Volaris announced an order for 39 Airbus A321neo. An existing order for 20 Airbus A320neo aircraft was converted into A321neo.
- On June 20, 2023, during the Paris Air Show, Volaris announced an order for 25 Airbus A321neo aircraft.

== Incidents ==
- On 8 December 2024, a passenger tried to enter the cockpit of a Volaris aircraft flying from Leon to Tijuana, forcing its diversion to Guadalajara, where the passenger was arrested after having been previously subdued by other passengers. The suspect said that he wanted to divert the aircraft to the United States after receiving a death threat from drug cartels.

== See also ==
- List of active Mexican airlines
- List of low-cost airlines
- Lists of airlines
