= Licenciado Gustavo Díaz Ordaz International Airport =

International airport in Puerto Vallarta, Jalisco, Mexico

Puerto Vallarta International Airport Aeropuerto Internacional de Puerto Vallarta
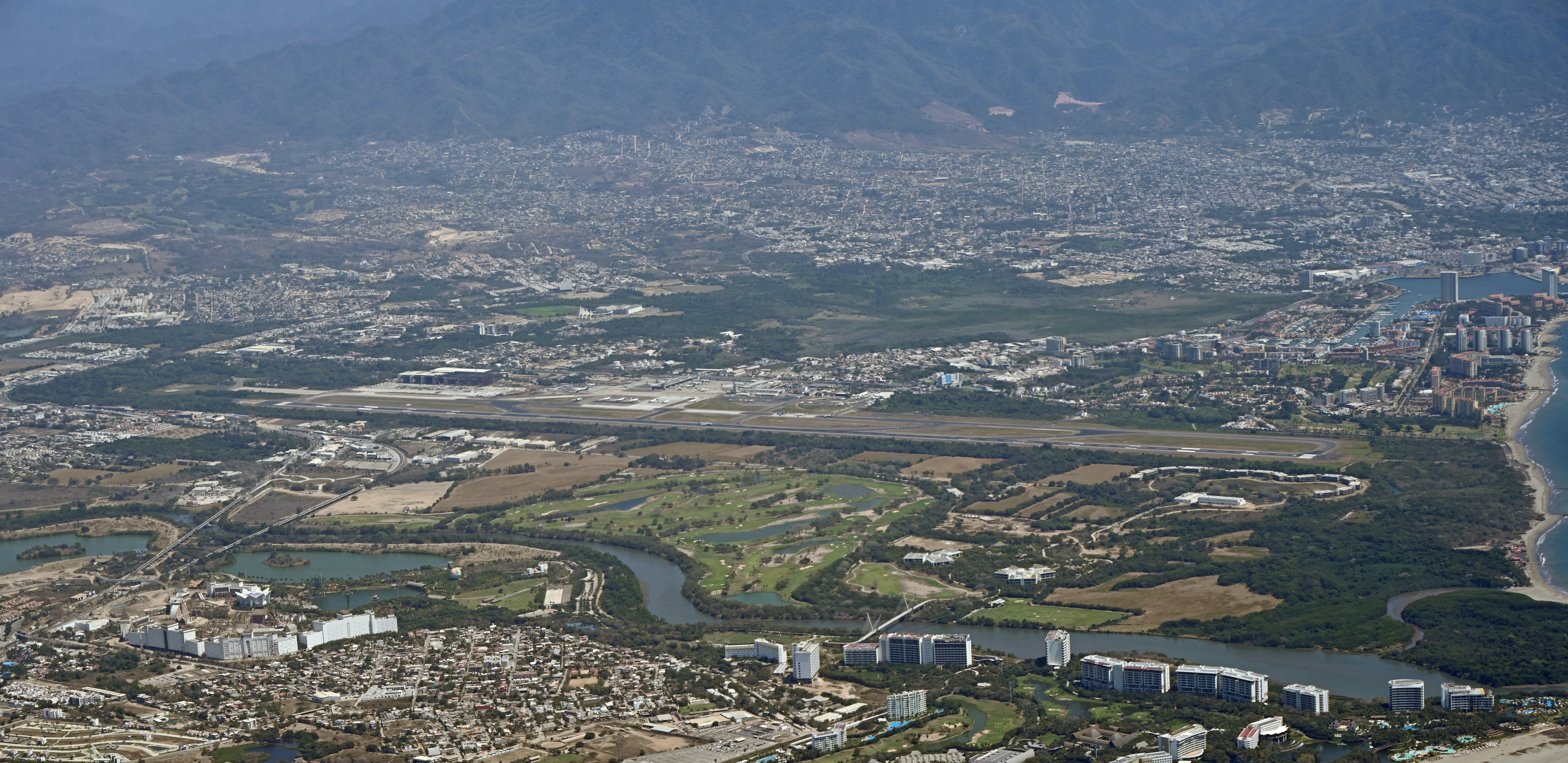
- Aerial view
- IATA: PVR; ICAO: MMPR

Summary
- Airport type: Public
- Operator: Grupo Aeroportuario del Pacífico
- Serves: Puerto Vallarta, Jalisco, Mexico
- Focus city for: TAR Aerolíneas
- Time zone: CST (UTC−06:00)
- Elevation AMSL: 7 m (23 ft)
- Coordinates: 20°40′48″N 105°15′15″W
- Website: www.aeropuertosgap.com.mx/en/puerto-vallarta-3

Map
- Location of the airport in Jalisco PVR/MMPR (Mexico)

Runways
Direction	Length		Surface
Direction	m	ft	Surface
04/22	3,100	10,171	Asphalt

Statistics (2025)
- Total passengers: 6,947,700
- Ranking in Mexico: 8th ▼1
- Departure Information; Arrival Information; Source: Grupo Aeroportuario del Pacífico

Licenciado Gustavo Díaz Ordaz International Airport (Spanish: Aeropuerto Internacional Licenciado Gustavo Díaz Ordaz) (IATA: PVR, ICAO: MMPR), simply known as Puerto Vallarta International Airport (Aeropuerto Internacional de Puerto Vallarta), is an international airport serving Puerto Vallarta, Jalisco, Mexico. It serves as a gateway to the Mexican tourist destination of Riviera Nayarit and the Jalisco coast year-round, offering flights to and from Mexico, the United States, Canada, and the United Kingdom. The airport also houses facilities for the Mexican Army and supports various tourism, flight training, and general aviation activities. Operated by Grupo Aeroportuario del Pacífico, it is named after President Gustavo Díaz Ordaz.

Ranked as the fifth-busiest airport in Mexico for international passenger traffic and the seventh-busiest in terms of passenger numbers and aircraft operations, it has witnessed rapid growth, becoming one of the country's fastest-growing airports: in 2024, it served 6,803,500 passengers, increasing to 6,947,700 in 2025. The airport connects travelers to 57 destinations, including 16 domestic and 41 international, served by 24 airlines.

== Facilities ==
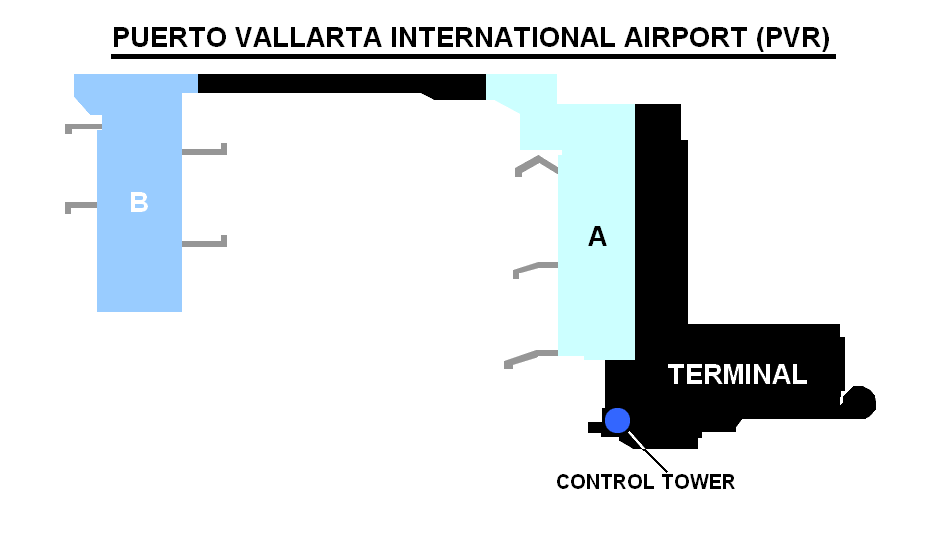
Terminal map

The airport is situated within the Puerto Vallarta Urban area, just one km north of Marina Vallarta, at an elevation of 7 metres (23 ft) above mean sea level. It features a single runway, designated as 04/22, measuring 3,100 metres (10,200 ft) in length with an asphalt surface. The commercial aviation apron provides twelve aircraft parking positions next to the terminal and eight remote positions. The general aviation apron offers stands for fixed-wing aircraft and heliports for private aviation.

=== Passenger terminals ===
The passenger terminal is a two-story structure. The ground floor includes the main entrance, a check-in area, and the arrivals section, housing customs and immigration facilities, as well as baggage claim services. Additionally, amenities such as car rental services, taxi stands, snack bars, and souvenir shops are available. The upper terminal floor features a security checkpoint and a departures area divided into two sections.

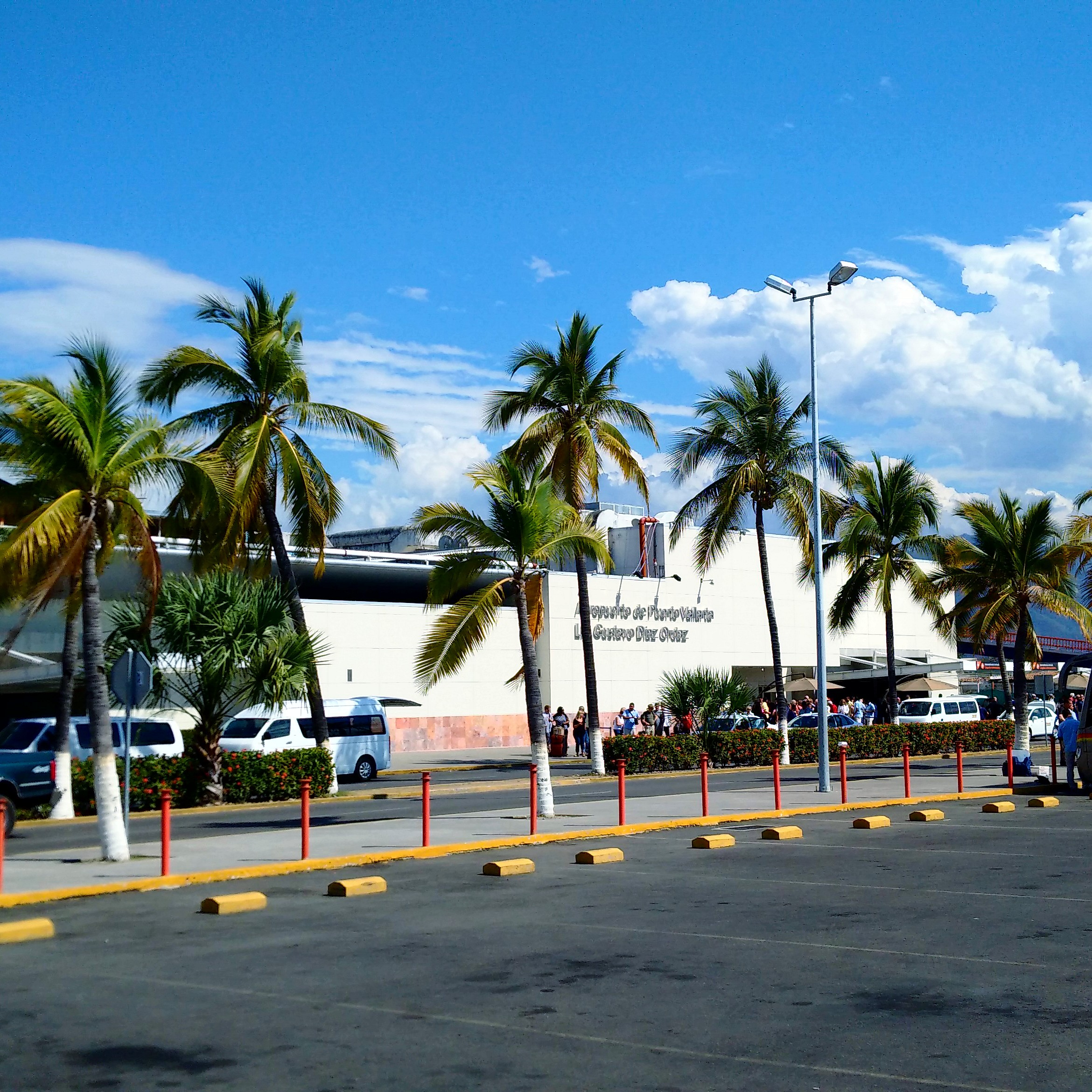
Passenger terminal entrance

Concourse A (Gates 1-5A) caters to domestic flights and includes waiting areas with shops, food stands, and a VIP Lounge. The concourse is equipped with five gates: gates 1–3 on the top floor have jet bridges, while gates 4 and 5 on the ground floor allow passengers to board directly from the apron. Airlines operating from this concourse include Aeromexico, Aeromexico Connect, Viva, Volaris, TAR, and Magni.

Concourse B is situated in a satellite building connected to the main terminal by a walkway. This concourse serves international flights, primarily from the United States and Canadian airlines. It offers seating areas, food stands, restaurants, a VIP lounge, and duty-free shops. The satellite has 15 gates (gates 6-20B) spread across two floors, with those on the top floor equipped with jet bridges. All international airlines operate from this area.

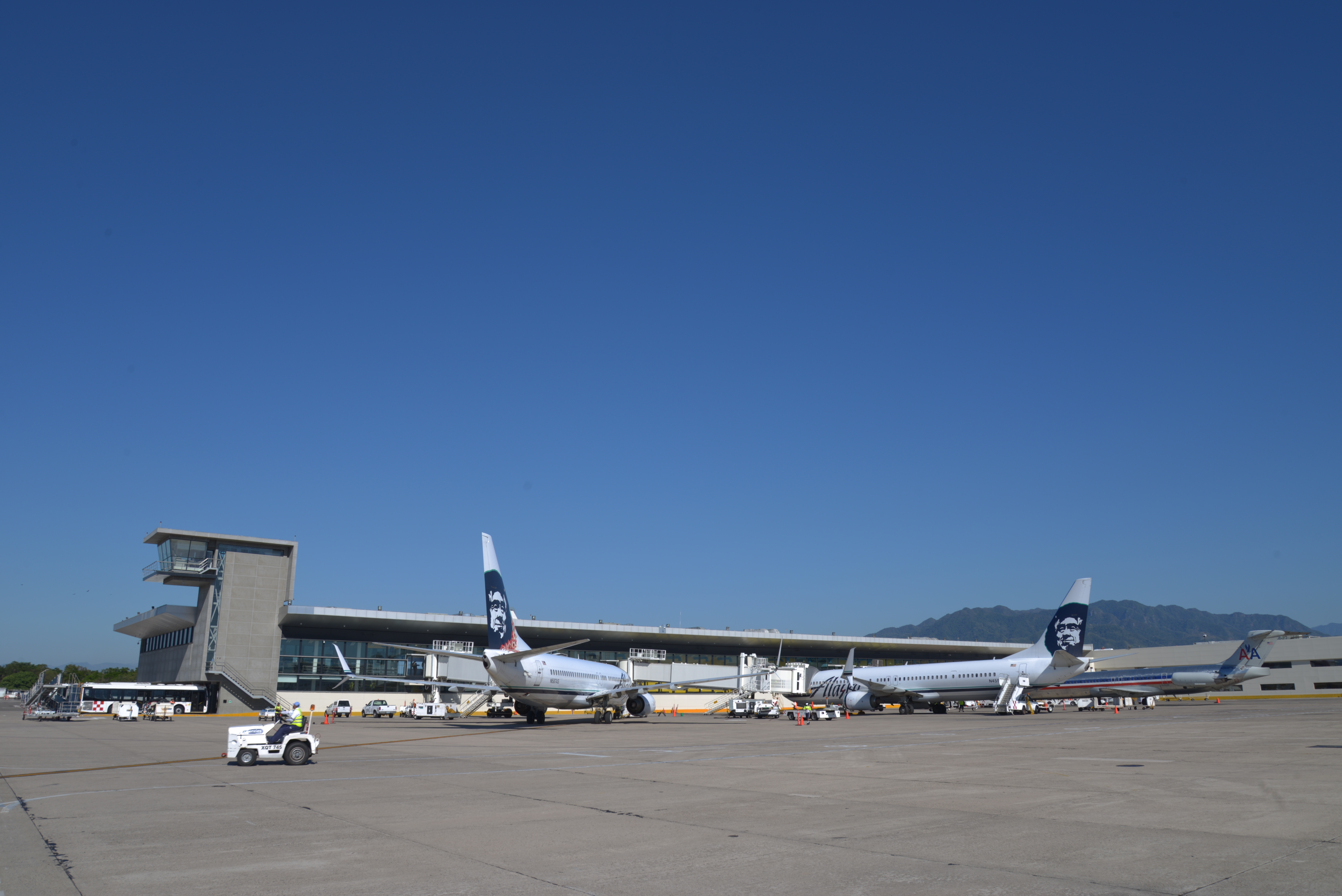
Satellite B airside

In 2022, the construction of a new Terminal 2 officially began. The terminal is projected to cover more than 68,000 square metres (730,000 sq ft), featuring significant expansions, resulting in an increase from 9 to 16 remote boarding gates and from 11 to 19 boarding bridges. The development also encompasses improvements to parking facilities and the establishment of a new bus terminal. Terminal 2 is planned to have the capacity to mobilize 4.5 million passengers annually and aims to become the first airport in Latin America certified as NET Zero.

=== Other facilities ===
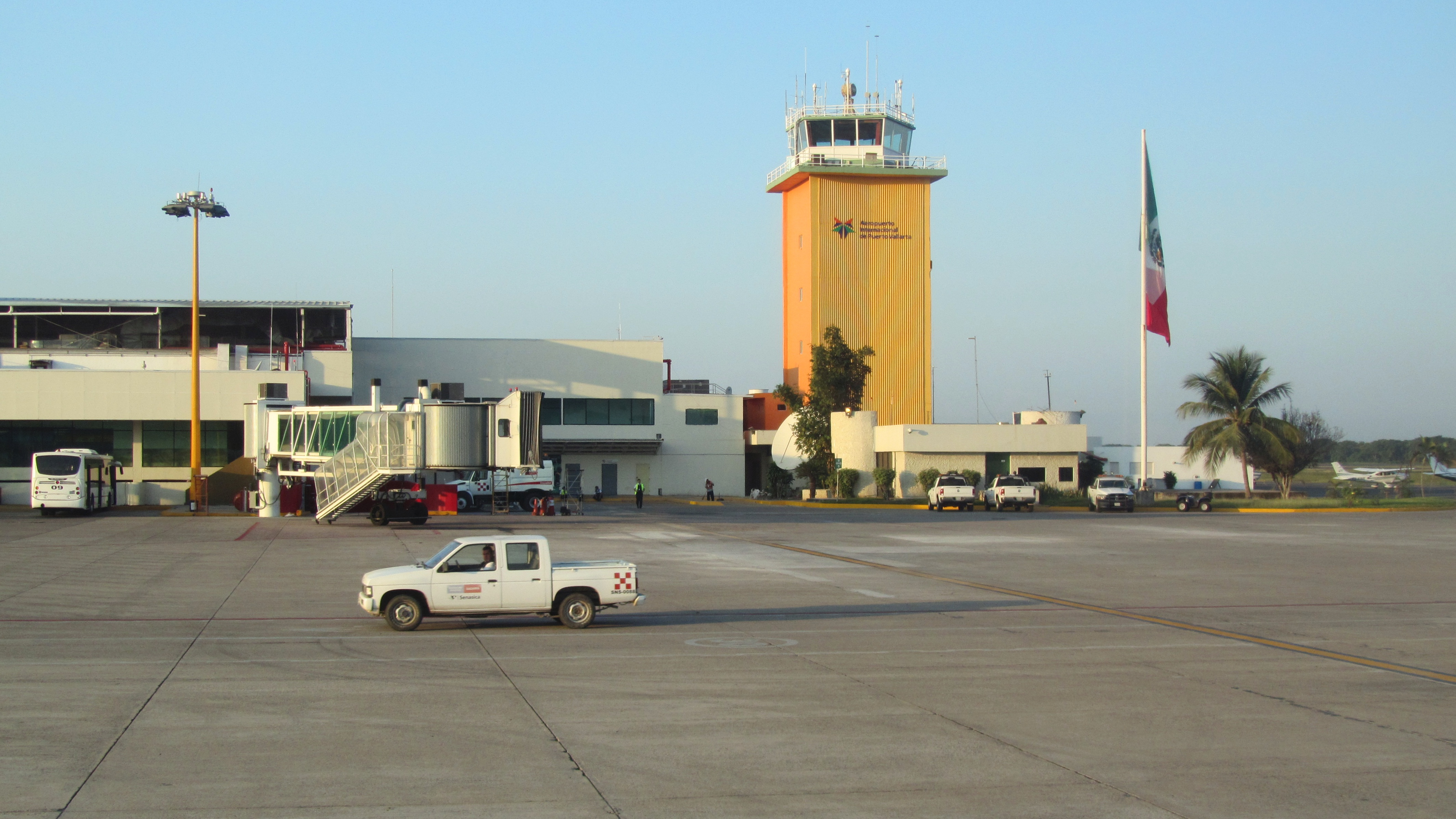
Control tower

In the vicinity of the passenger terminal, various facilities are situated, including civil aviation hangars, courier and logistics companies, and cargo services. Additionally, there is a dedicated general aviation terminal that supports a range of activities such as tourism, flight training, executive aviation, and general aviation.

Air Force Station No. 5 (Spanish: Estación Aérea Militar N.º 5, Campo Militar N.º 41-A) (E.A.M. No. 5) is located on the airport grounds, north of Runway 04/22. This station does not currently have active squadrons assigned to it. It features an aviation platform spanning 5,400 square metres (58,000 sq ft), one hangar, and other facilities designed to accommodate Air Force personnel.

== Airlines and destinations ==
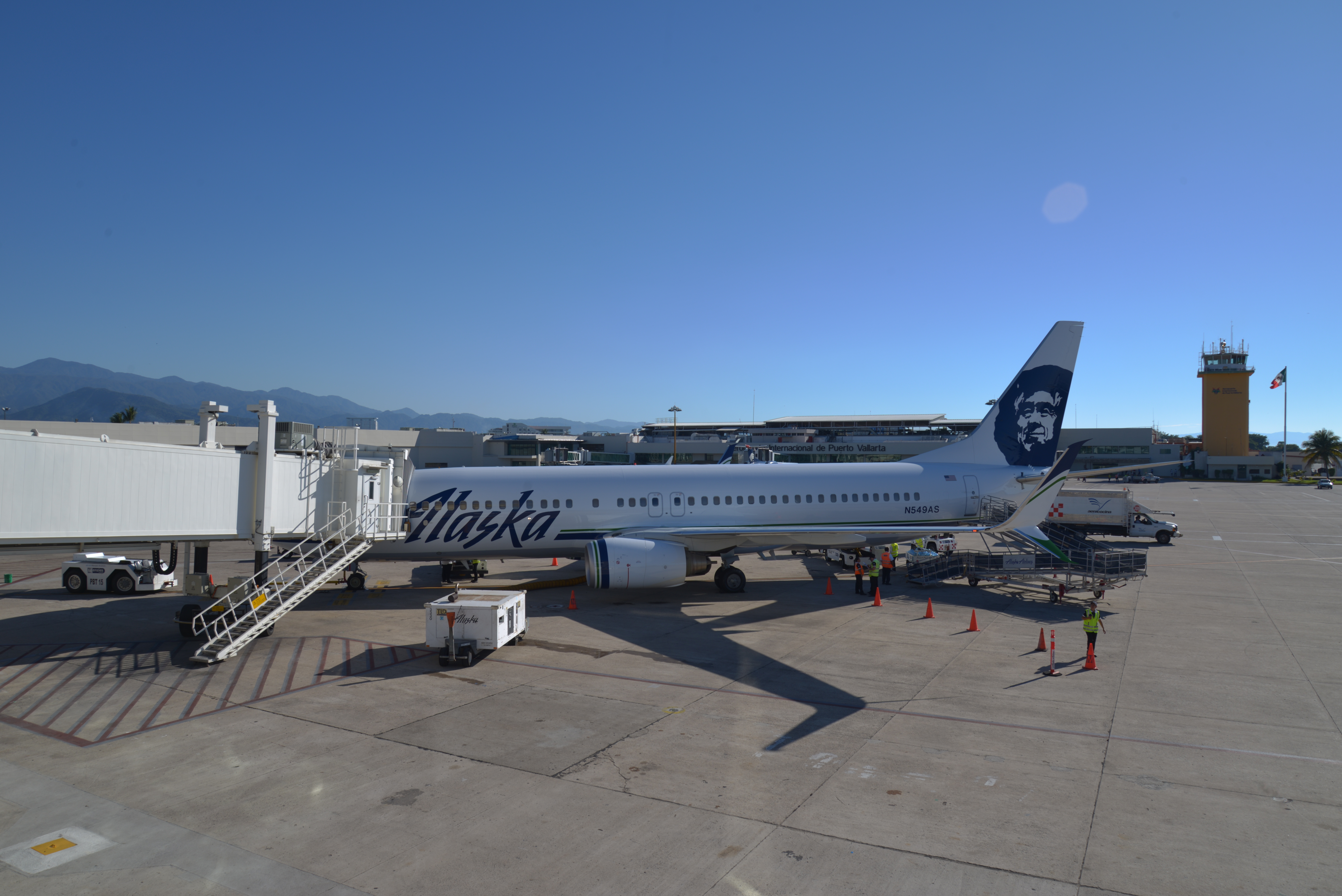
Alaska Airlines Boeing B737 at PVR

Intense seasonal tourism to Puerto Vallarta means that passenger traffic at the airport is notably focused on flights to the United States and Canada. Among the busiest routes at the airport are those to Los Angeles, Dallas, and Phoenix. WestJet stands out as the airline serving the largest number of destinations, connecting Puerto Vallarta with 12 Canadian airports during the high season.

=== Passenger ===
Airlines	Destinations
Aeroméxico	Mexico City–Benito Juárez
Aeroméxico Connect	Mexico City–Benito Juárez, Mexico City–Felipe Ángeles
Air Canada	Toronto–Pearson, Vancouver; Seasonal: Montréal–Trudeau
Air Canada Rouge	Seasonal: Calgary (begins December 10, 2026)
Air Transat	Seasonal: Montréal–Trudeau, Quebec City, Toronto–Pearson
Alaska Airlines	Los Angeles, San Diego, San Francisco, Seattle/Tacoma; Seasonal: Portland (OR)
American Airlines	Dallas/Fort Worth, Los Angeles, Phoenix–Sky Harbor; Seasonal: Chicago–O'Hare
American Eagle	Seasonal: Los Angeles
Cabo Flight Center	Cabo San Lucas
Delta Air Lines	Atlanta, Los Angeles, Salt Lake City, Seattle/Tacoma; Seasonal: Detroit, Minneapolis/St. Paul
Flair Airlines	Seasonal: Calgary, Edmonton, Montréal–Trudeau (starts December 16, 2026), Toronto–Pearson, Vancouver
Mexicana de Aviación	Mexico City–Felipe Ángeles
Porter Airlines	Seasonal: Edmonton (begins November 3, 2026), Hamilton (ON), Ottawa, Toronto–Pearson
Southwest Airlines	Denver, Houston–Hobby, Las Vegas, Orange County, Phoenix–Sky Harbor, St. Louis, San Diego; Seasonal: Austin, Sacramento
Sun Country Airlines	Minneapolis/St. Paul
United Airlines	Denver, Houston–Intercontinental, Newark, San Francisco; Seasonal: Chicago–O'Hare, Los Angeles
United Express	Seasonal: Houston–Intercontinental
Viva	Chihuahua, Guadalajara, Mexico City–Benito Juárez, Mexico City–Felipe Ángeles, Monterrey, Tijuana, Toluca/Mexico City
Volaris	Aguascalientes, Guadalajara, León/Bajío, Mexicali, Mexico City–Benito Juárez, Mexico City–Felipe Ángeles, Monterrey, Puebla, Queretaro, San Luis Potosí, Tijuana, Toluca/Mexico City
WestJet	Calgary, Edmonton, Toronto–Pearson, Vancouver; Seasonal: Abbotsford, Comox, Kelowna, Prince George, Regina, Saskatoon, Victoria, Winnipeg
World2Fly	Seasonal charter: Prague

=== Destinations map ===
Domestic destinations from Puerto Vallarta International Airport
Red = Year-round destination
Blue = Future destination
Green = Seasonal destination
Canada destinations from Puerto Vallarta International Airport
Red = Year-round destination
Blue = Future destination
Green = Seasonal destination
United States destinations from Puerto Vallarta International Airport
Red = Year-round destination
Blue = Future destination
Green = Seasonal destination
Europe destinations from Puerto Vallarta International Airport
Green = Seasonal destination

== Statistics ==
=== Annual Traffic ===
Passenger statistics at Puerto Vallarta International Airport
Year	Total Passengers	change %
2010	2,735,300	Steady
2011	2,535,900	▼7.3%
2012	2,597,700	▲2.4%
2013	2,671,200	▲2.8%
2014	3,127,200	▲17.1%
2015	3,593,500	▲14.9%
2016	4,063,300	▲13.1%
2017	4,522,600	▲11.3%
2018	4,767,100	▲5.4%
2019	5,051,900	▲6.0%
2020	2,536,100	▼49.8%
2021	4,120,000	▲62.5%
2022	6,208,700	▲50.7%
2023	6,790,100	▲9.4%
2024	6,803,500	▲0.2%
2025	6,947,700	▲2.1%

=== Busiest routes ===
Busiest domestic routes at PVR (Jan–Dec 2025)
Rank	Airport	Passengers
1	Mexico City, Mexico City	498,403
2	Monterrey, Nuevo León	242,192
3	Tijuana, Baja California	236,551
4	Guadalajara, Jalisco	204,097
5	Mexico City-AIFA, State of Mexico	99,426
6	Toluca, State of Mexico	81,757
7	León/El Bajío, Guanajuato	71,735
8	Querétaro, Querétaro	62,568
9	Mexicali, Baja California	18,513
10	Ciudad Juárez, Chihuahua	17,940

Busiest international routes at PVR (Jan–Dec 2025)
Rank	Airport	Passengers
1	Los Angeles, United States	195,234
2	Dallas/Fort Worth, United States	174,657
3	Phoenix–Sky Harbor, United States	149,659
4	San Francisco, United States	136,543
5	Vancouver, Canada	122,905
6	Houston (Intercontinental and Hobby, United States) (Note: The official statistics combine both George Bush Intercontinental and Hobby airports.)	116,062
7	Denver, United States	114,039
8	Calgary, Canada	110,422
9	Seattle–Tacoma, United States	83,671
10	Toronto–Pearson, Canada	69,886

== See also ==
- List of the busiest airports in Mexico
- List of airports in Mexico
- List of airports by ICAO code: M
- List of busiest airports in North America
- List of the busiest airports in Latin America
- Transportation in Mexico
- Tourism in Mexico
- Grupo Aeroportuario del Pacífico
- List of beaches in Mexico
- List of Mexican military installations
- Mexican Air Force
- Economy of Jalisco
- Riviera Nayarit
- Nuevo Vallarta
