= Guadalajara International Airport =

International airport serving Guadalajara, Jalisco, Mexico

Guadalajara International Airport Aeropuerto Internacional de Guadalajara Miguel Hidalgo y Costilla
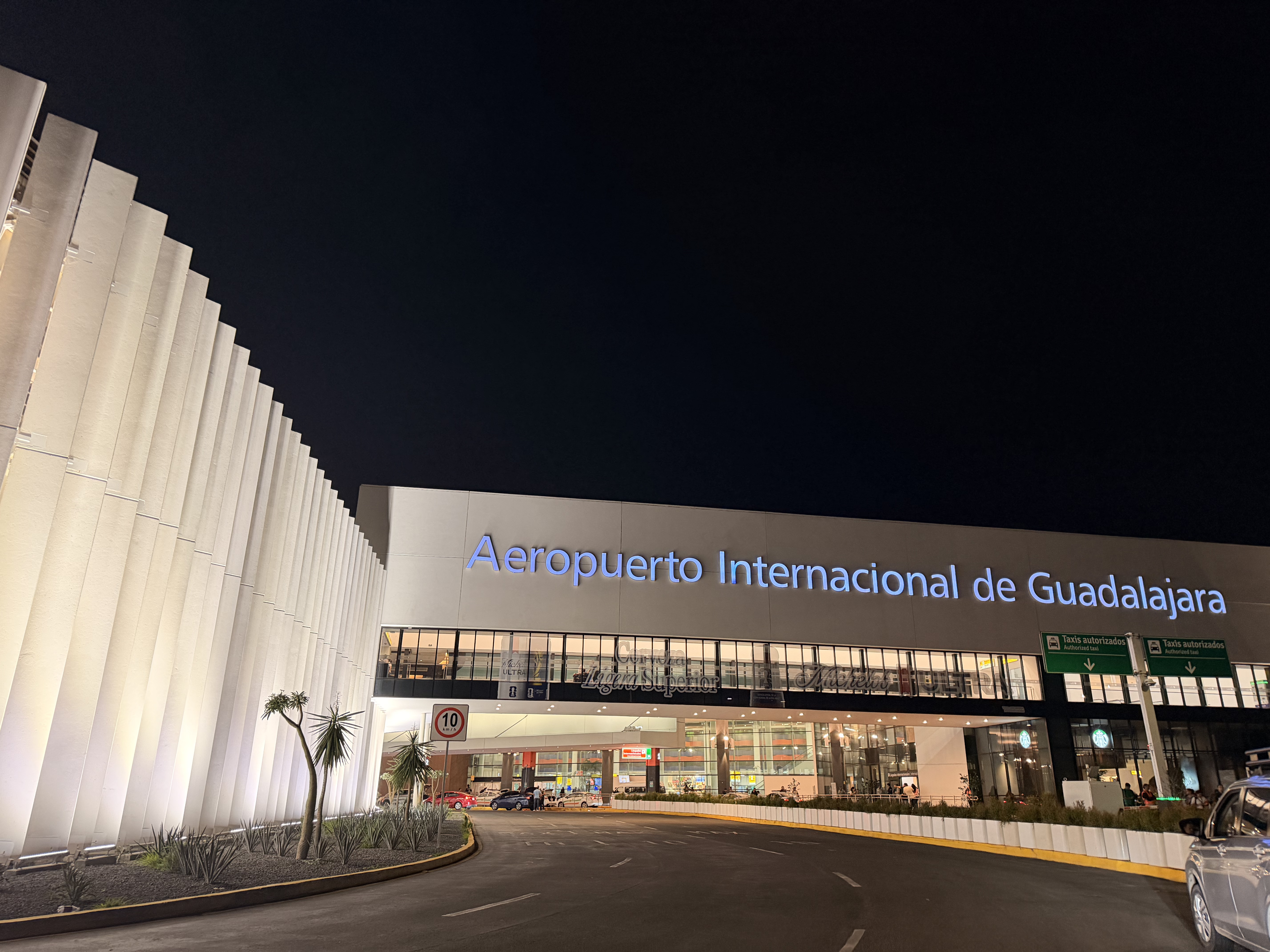
- IATA: GDL; ICAO: MMGL

Summary
- Airport type: Public
- Operator: Grupo Aeroportuario del Pacífico
- Serves: Guadalajara, Jalisco, Mexico
- Location: Tlajomulco de Zúñiga, Jalisco
- Opened: March 1, 1951
- Hub for: Volaris; Viva
- Focus city for: Aeromexico
- Time zone: CST (UTC-06:00)
- Elevation AMSL: 1,529 m (5,016 ft)
- Coordinates: 20°31′18″N 103°18′40″W
- Website: www.aeropuertosgap.com.mx/en/guadalajara-3.html

Maps
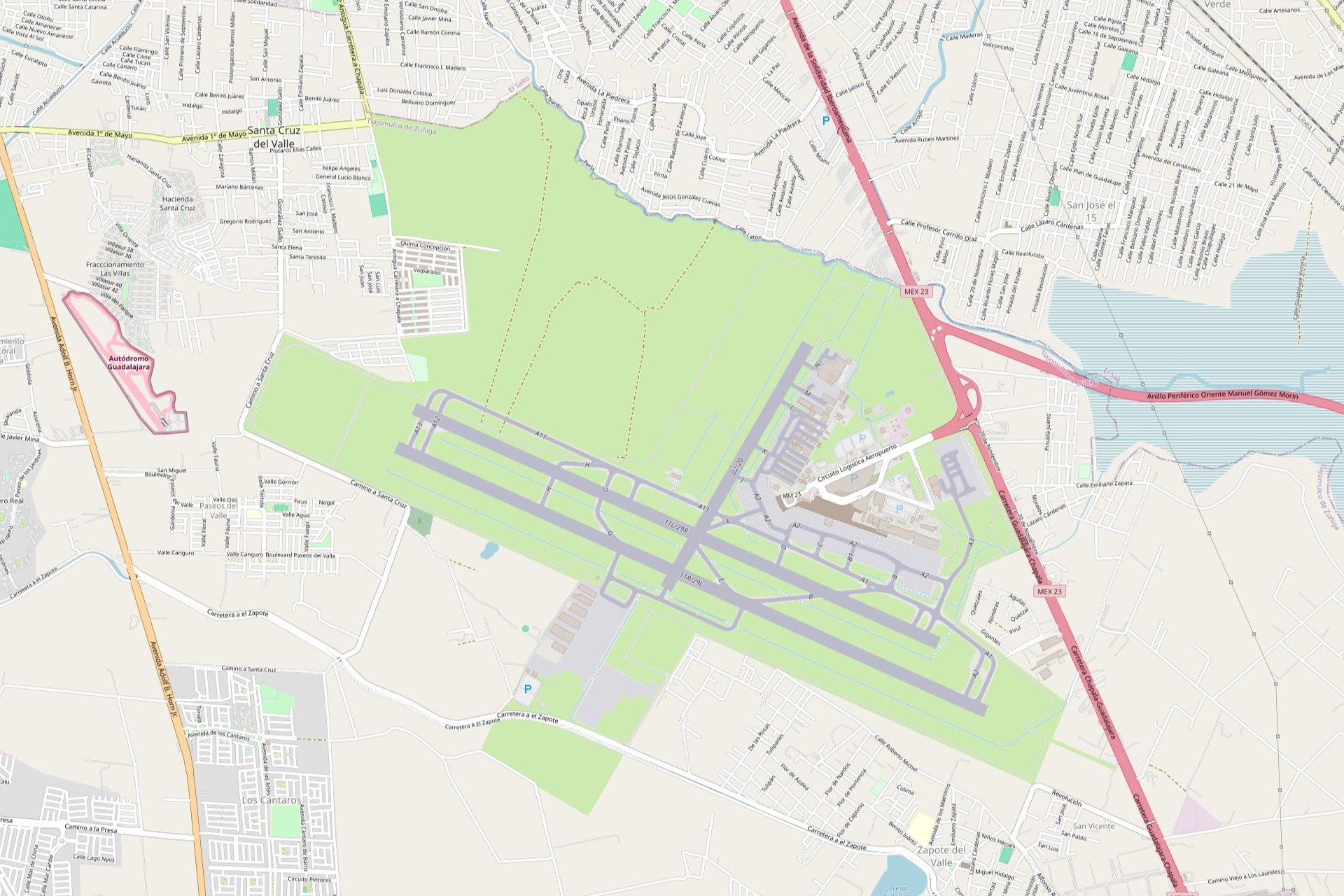
- Guadalajara airport diagram

- Location of airport in Jalisco GDL (Mexico)

Runways
| Direction | Length | | Surface |
| Direction | m | ft | Surface |
|---|---|---|---|
| 11R/29L | 4,000 | 13,123 | Asphalt |
| 11L/29R | 3,538 | 11,608 | Asphalt |
| ~~02/20~~ (Closed) | ~~1,818~~ | ~~5,964~~ | ~~Asphalt~~ |

Statistics (2025)
- Total passengers: 18,696,600
- Ranking in Mexico: 3rd
- Source: Grupo Aeroportuario del Pacífico

Guadalajara International Airport (Spanish: Aeropuerto Internacional de Guadalajara); officially Aeropuerto Internacional Miguel Hidalgo y Costilla (Miguel Hidalgo y Costilla International Airport) (IATA: GDL, ICAO: MMGL), is the international airport serving Guadalajara, Jalisco, Mexico. It is Mexico's third-busiest airport in passenger traffic, aircraft operations, and cargo volume, offering flights across Mexico, the Americas, and Europe. It ranks ninth in Latin America and 39th in North America by passenger traffic.

The airport is the largest hub for Volaris, serving as the airline's main gateway to the United States. It is also a hub for Viva, and a focus city for Aeroméxico. Additionally, it supports charter flights, flight training programs, and general aviation activities. Guadalajara International Airport is operated by Grupo Aeroportuario del Pacífico (GAP) and is named after Miguel Hidalgo y Costilla, a leader of the Mexican War of Independence. In 2024, it handled 17,848,700 passengers, and 18,696,600 in 2025.

== History ==
=== Early operations ===
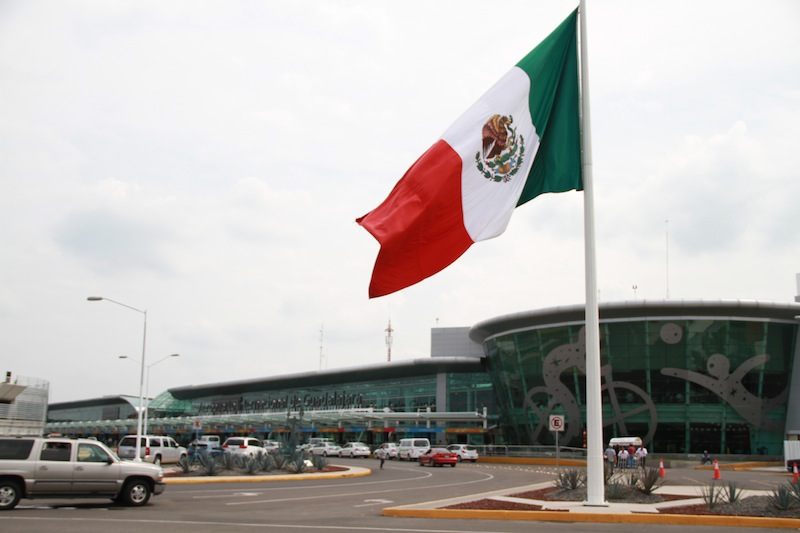
Terminal entrance

Guadalajara Airport was inaugurated on March 1, 1951, featuring two asphalt runways, an apron, and a small passenger terminal. The opening ceremony was officiated by President Miguel Alemán Valdés. It has undergone significant expansions since its early days. In 1966, operations were briefly suspended due to safety concerns raised by the Technical Commission of the Mexican Pilots Association (Spanish: Asociación Sindical de Pilotos Aviadores de México ASPA). Urgent repairs were carried out, with airlines temporarily redirected to the Zapopan Air Force Base. The renovation efforts included enlarging the original 2,200 metres (7,200 ft) runway 10/28. By 1968, the runway was reconstructed and extended to 4,000 metres (13,000 ft), coinciding with the reconstruction of the airport's passenger building.

The airport was reinaugurated as the new Miguel Hidalgo International Airport in 1968. This transformation allowed it to accommodate wide-body aircraft and was executed largely using existing infrastructure, with the old runway, apron, and building repurposed for general aviation. Throughout the following years, the airport underwent further transformations. In 1973, runways, taxiways, aprons, passenger buildings, parking lots, a control tower, and fuel storage areas were completely renovated or newly constructed. Technological enhancements, such as jetbridges, high-intensity lights, visual approach slope indicator (VASI) and runway end identifier lights (REIL) were implemented to ensure operational efficiency and safety.

=== Hub operations ===
In the 1980s, Mexicana, a key player in the country's aviation industry, began a decentralization effort to address congestion at Mexico City International Airport. Guadalajara, alongside airports like Monterrey and Mérida, played a pivotal role in accommodating additional routes and frequencies to alleviate pressure on the capital's airport. As part of this initiative, a Maintenance Base was inaugurated in 1988. This facility had the capacity to service ten Boeing 727-200 aircraft and two DC-10s, representing approximately 23% of the airline's fleet. Until Mexicana's bankruptcy, the airport served as a hub for the airline, functioning as one of its gateways to the United States.

On May 24, 1993, the airport parking lot became the site of a deadly firefight between the Logan Heights Gang, associated with the Tijuana Cartel, and the Sinaloa Cartel. This confrontation resulted in seven fatalities, including Catholic Archbishop Juan Jesús Posadas Ocampo.

In 1994, expansion and adaptation projects were funded by Aeropuertos y Servicios Auxiliares (ASA), leading to significant improvements in the passenger terminal and departures concourse. The apron was extended, and two taxiways were added. A transformative year came in 1995 with the publication of the 'Ley de Aeropuertos' (Airports Law) by the Department of Communications and Transportation (Spanish: Secretaría de Comunicaciones y Transportes), marking the inception of Mexico's airport privatization program. In 1999, Guadalajara Airport joined Grupo Aeroportuario del Pacífico (GAP), a consortium headquartered in Guadalajara.

The airport served as a hub for Aero California from its establishment in 1960 until its bankruptcy in 2006. In the 2000s, it also served as the primary hub and secondary hub for the now-defunct regional airlines ALMA and Aeromar. In 2010, Volaris commenced service to Guadalajara, absorbing routes from the defunct Aerocalifornia and Mexicana. This marked the establishment of what is now Volaris' largest hub.

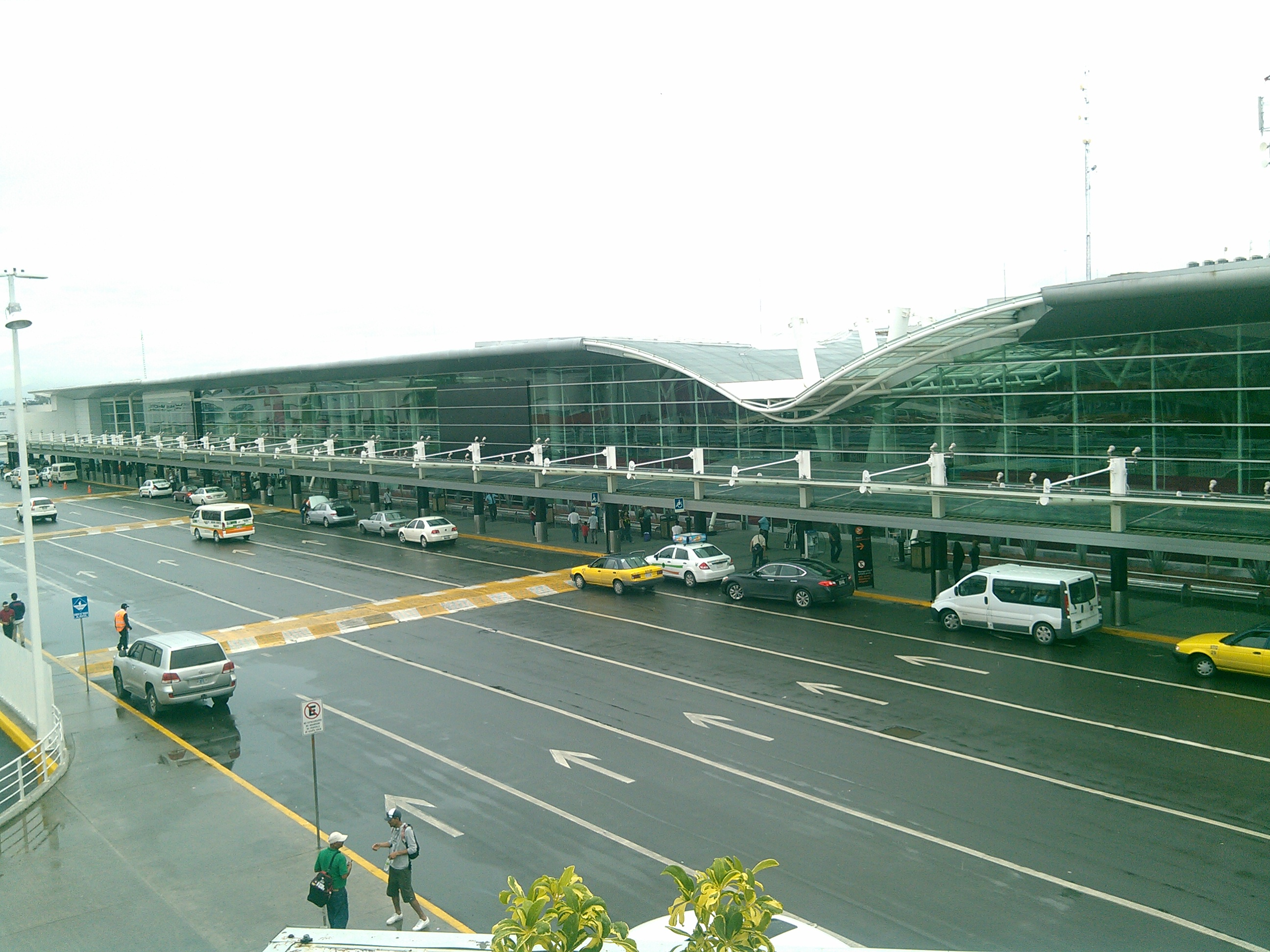
Passenger terminal before the renovation

=== Expansion challenges and local concerns ===
In 2020, Grupo Aeroportuario del Pacífico announced an investment of 14 billion pesos in Guadalajara Airport. This funding was allocated to key developments, including the construction of a new runway on the northern side of the airport, which would position the terminal and other buildings between the two runways, creating a midfield layout. Other developments include improved terminal access, an expanded parking lot, a hotel, an office complex, and a solar power plant. The comprehensive expansion project is slated for completion by 2024.

Despite the promising vision, the expansion faced setbacks due to resident conflicts. Protests disrupted parking access, and residents claimed that Grupo Aeroportuario del Pacífico still owed compensation for land expropriated in 1975. This dispute delayed the construction of the second runway and raised the possibility of further expropriations.

In December 2021, Guadalajara Airport achieved a significant milestone with the introduction of Aeroméxico's nonstop flights to Madrid, operated by a Boeing 787. This marked the airport's first direct connection to Europe.

In July 2023, Grupo Aeroportuario del Pacífico (GAP) inaugurated a second parallel runway (3,538 metres (11,608 ft) long, 45 metres (148 ft) wide) 270 metres (890 ft) north of runway 11/29. While it does not allow simultaneous operations, it facilitates segregated operations, with one runway dedicated to departures and the other to arrivals, allowing for up to 60 operations per hour under segregated-use conditions.

Expansion plans moved forward with a $1.26 billion USD investment, part of a larger $2.52 billion USD master plan for 2025–2029. The acquisition of 285 hectares (700 acres) of surrounding land, which had previously been a point of contention, was resolved, providing space for a potential third runway. The project also includes a $1.07 billion USD investment in a new 69,000 square metres (740,000 sq ft) terminal, increasing capacity by 70%.

== Facilities ==
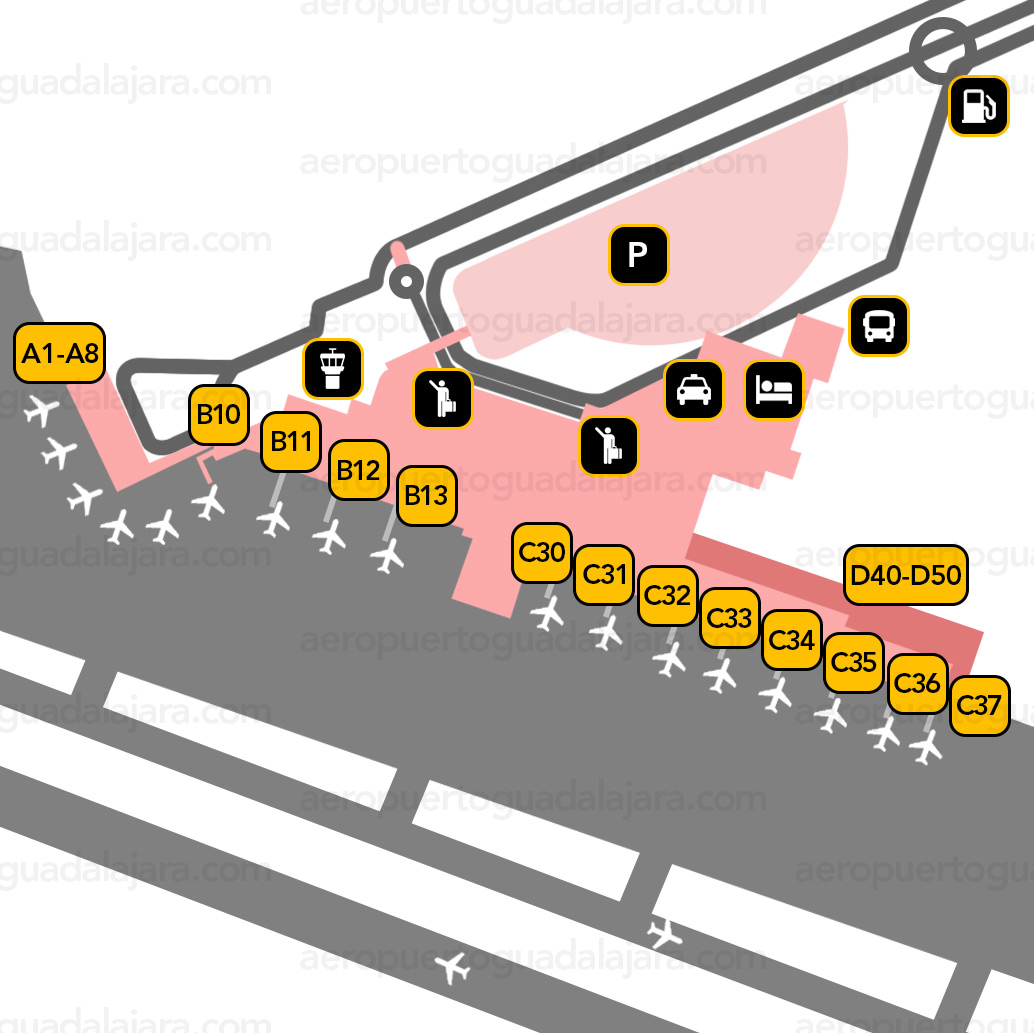
Terminal map

The airport is located in the municipality of Tlajomulco de Zúñiga, approximately 17 kilometres (11 mi) southeast of Downtown Guadalajara. Located within built-up areas of the Metropolitan zone, the airport is situated at an elevation of 1,529 metres (5,016 ft) above sea level, featuring two asphalt runways: Runway 11R/29L measuring 4,000 metres (13,000 ft), and Runway 11L/29R measuring 3,538 metres (11,608 ft).

=== Passenger Terminal ===
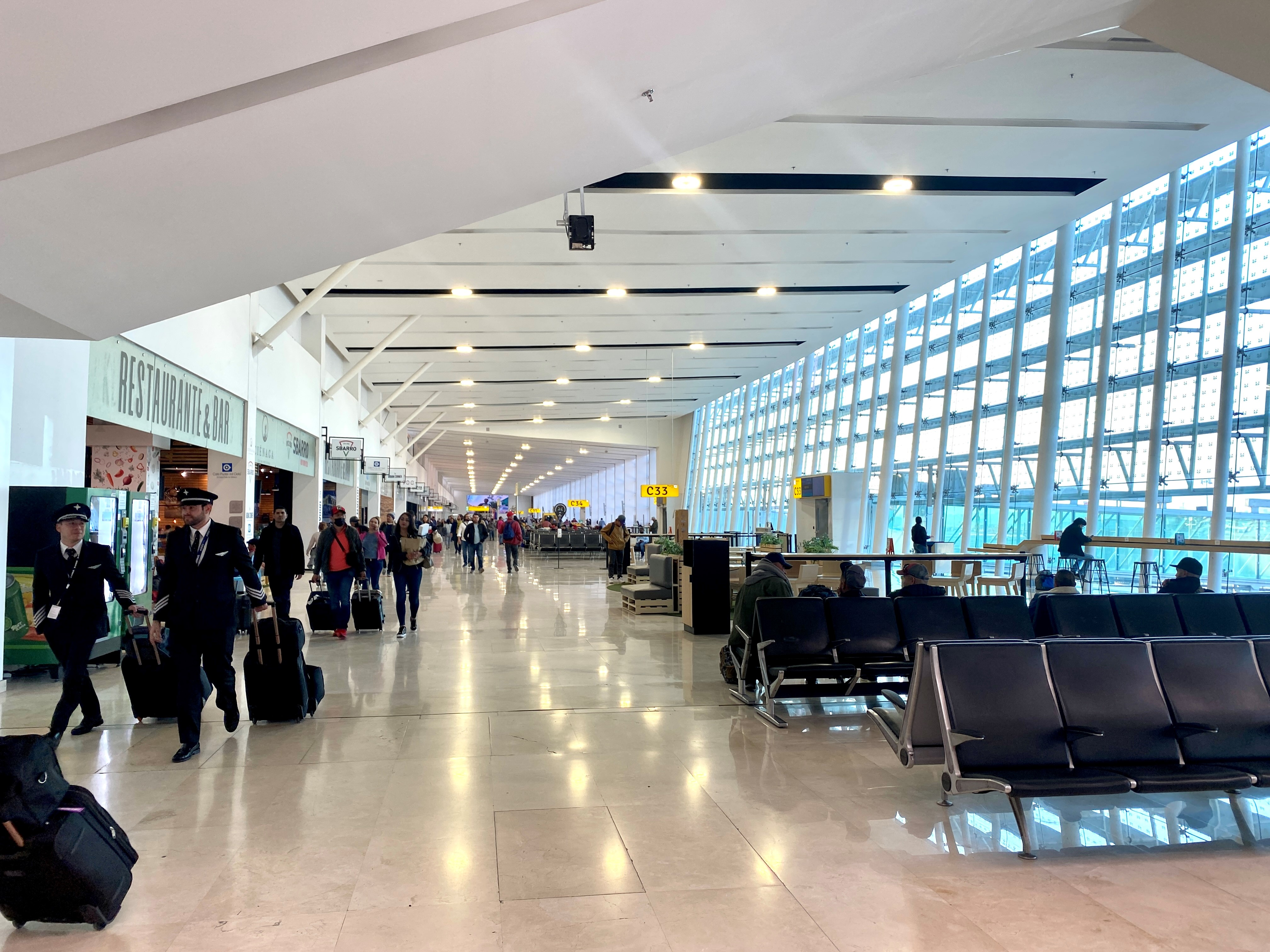
Departures concourse C

The airport's single terminal spans an area of 89,300 square metres (961,000 sq ft) and is currently undergoing renovations. Operating as a two-story facility, the terminal facilitates domestic and international flights. The ground floor encompasses arrival amenities, including baggage claim carousels, domestic check-in sections, and a commercial corridor housing snack kiosks, banks, souvenir shops, and car rental services. The upper floor features security checkpoints and a departures area extending 630 metres (2,070 ft), with food courts, restaurants, and 43 gates distributed across four concourses:

- Concourse A: Airside walk-up gates A1–A8
- Concourse B: Jetbridge gates B10–B13
- Concourse C: Jetbridge gates C30–C37
- Concourse D: Ground floor, bus gates D40–D50

Various VIP lounges, such as the Aeroméxico Salón Premier, Citibanamex Salón Beyond, VIP Lounge East, and VIP Lounge West, are available within the passenger terminal. Additionally, nearby hotel services include City Express Guadalajara Aeropuerto, Hampton Inn by Hilton Guadalajara-Aeropuerto, and Hangar Inn.

=== Other facilities ===
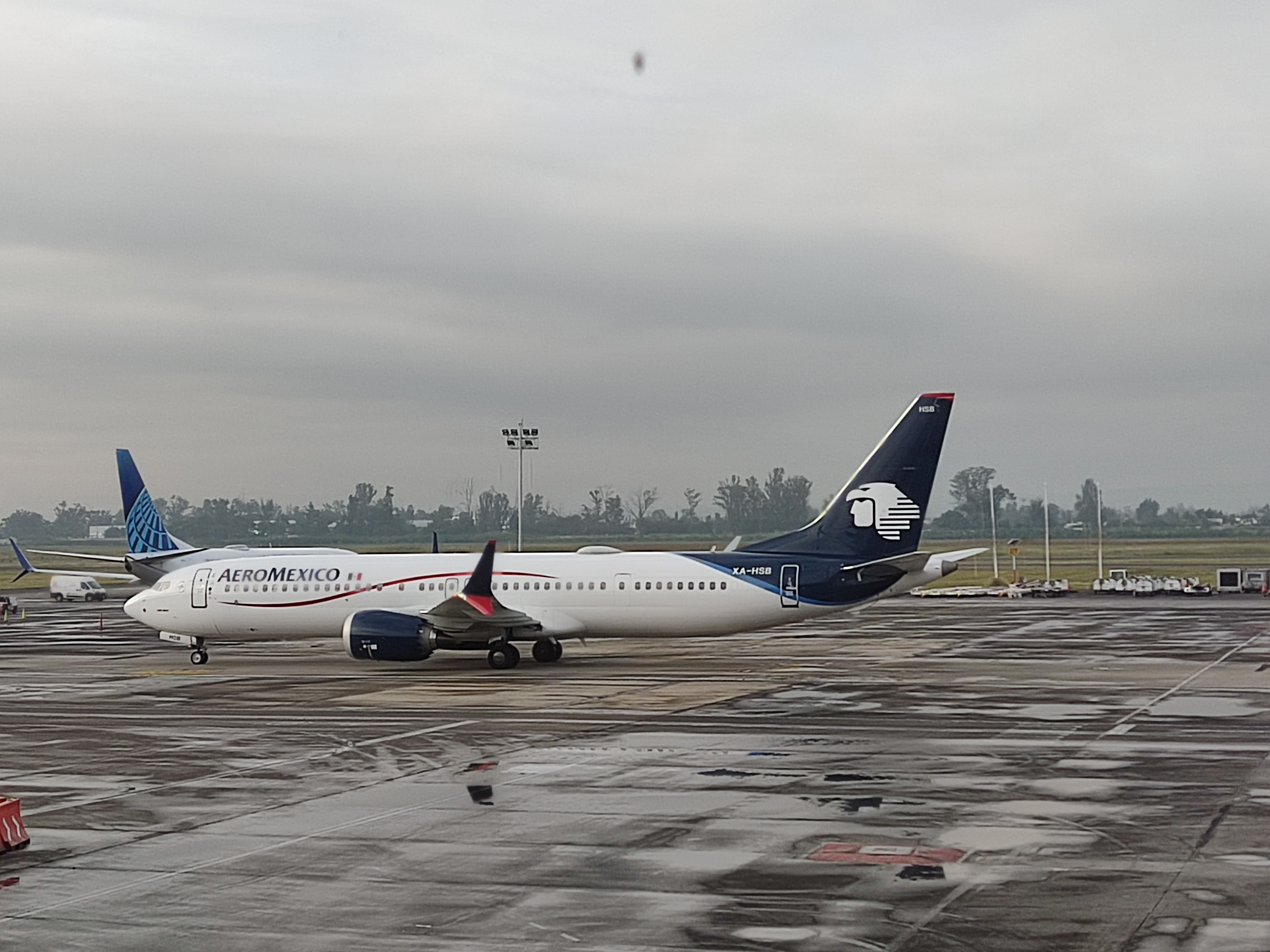
Aeromexico Boeing B737 MAX 9 at GDL

Air Force Station No. 1 (E.A.M. 1) (Spanish: Estación Aérea Militar N.º 1 Aeropuerto Internacional de Guadalajara) is situated on the airport grounds. Adjacent facilities encompass maintenance bases for Volaris and Aeromexico, an FBO terminal, a general aviation apron with several hangars, and a cargo terminal, recently expanded to handle approximately 350,000 tons of goods annually within its 27,000 square metres (290,000 sq ft). The cargo terminal features six positions capable of handling wide-body aircraft.

== Airlines and destinations ==
=== Passenger ===
| Airlines | Destinations |
|---|---|
| Aeroméxico | Los Angeles, Madrid, Mexico City–Benito Juárez, Paris–Charles de Gaulle (begins April 13, 2027), Salt Lake City; Seasonal: Chicago–O'Hare, Denver, Fresno, Las Vegas, Miami, New York–JFK (resumes December 17, 2026), Orlando, Sacramento, San Francisco, Seattle/Tacoma, Tijuana |
| Aeroméxico Connect | Mexico City–Felipe Ángeles |
| Air Canada | Toronto–Pearson |
| Alaska Airlines | Los Angeles; Seasonal: San Jose (CA), Seattle/Tacoma (begins March 18, 2027) |
| American Airlines | Dallas/Fort Worth |
| American Eagle | Phoenix–Sky Harbor |
| Copa Airlines | Panama City–Tocumen |
| Delta Air Lines | Atlanta |
| Flair Airlines | Toronto–Pearson, Vancouver |
| Mexicana de Aviación | Mexico City–Felipe Ángeles |
| United Airlines | Houston–Intercontinental |
| United Express | Houston–Intercontinental |
| Viva | Bogotá, Cancún, Chicago–O'Hare, Chihuahua, Ciudad Juárez, Dallas/Fort Worth, Hermosillo, Houston–Intercontinental, La Paz, Las Vegas, Los Angeles, Mérida, Mexicali, Mexico City–Benito Juárez, Mexico City–Felipe Ángeles, Monterrey, Puebla, Puerto Escondido, Puerto Vallarta, Reynosa, San José del Cabo, Tijuana, Tuxtla Gutiérrez, Veracruz, Villahermosa |
| Volaris | Acapulco, Atlanta, Bogotá, Boston, Cancún, Charlotte, Chicago–Midway, Chicago–O'Hare, Chihuahua, Ciudad Juárez, Ciudad Obregón, Culiacán, Dallas/Fort Worth, Denver, Detroit, Durango, Fresno, Guatemala City (resumes December 4, 2026), Hermosillo, Houston–Intercontinental, Ixtapa/Zihuatanejo, La Paz, Las Vegas, Los Angeles, Los Mochis, Mazatlán, Medellín–JMC (begins December 2, 2026), Mérida, Mexicali, Mexico City–Benito Juárez, Mexico City–Felipe Ángeles, Miami, Monterrey, Nashville, Newark, Oakland, Oaxaca,Ontario, Orlando, Phoenix–Sky Harbor, Portland (OR), Puebla, Puerto Escondido, Puerto Vallarta, Querétaro, Raleigh/Durham, Reno/Tahoe, Reynosa, Sacramento, Saltillo (begins December 1, 2026), Salt Lake City, San Antonio, San Jose (CA), San José del Cabo, San Luis Potosí, Seattle/Tacoma, Tapachula, Tijuana, Toluca/Mexico City, Torreón/Gómez Palacio, Tulum (ends January 7, 2027), Veracruz, Villahermosa, Washington–Dulles, Zacatecas |
| Volaris Costa Rica | San José (CR) |

=== Destinations map ===
Domestic destinations from Guadalajara International Airport
Red = Year-round destination
Blue = Future destination
Green = Seasonal destination
North American destinations from Guadalajara International Airport
Red = Year-round destination
Blue = Future destination
Green = Seasonal destination
European destinations from Guadalajara International Airport
Red = Year-round destination
Blue = Future destination
Green = Seasonal destination

== Statistics ==
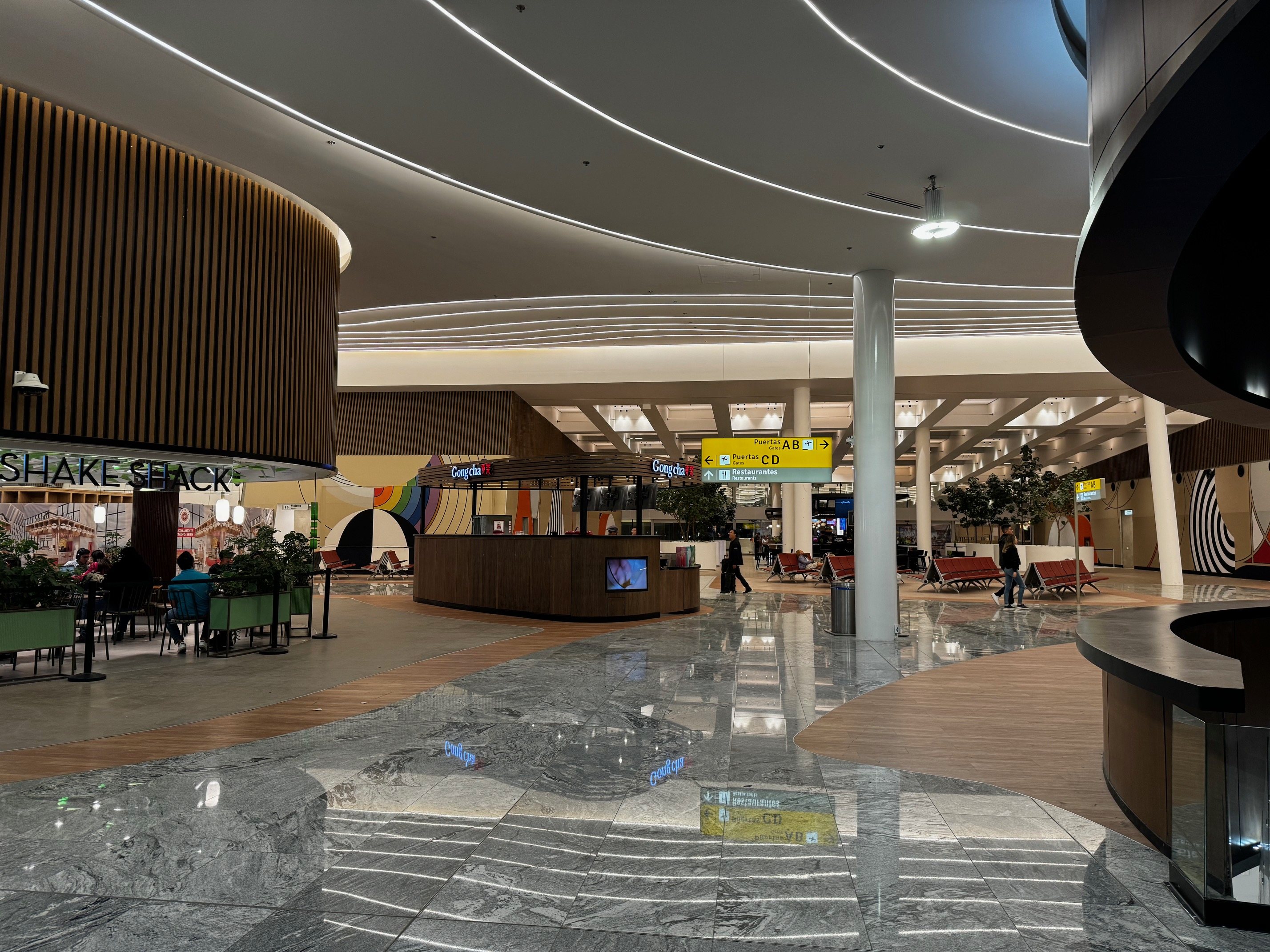
Interior of the main terminal

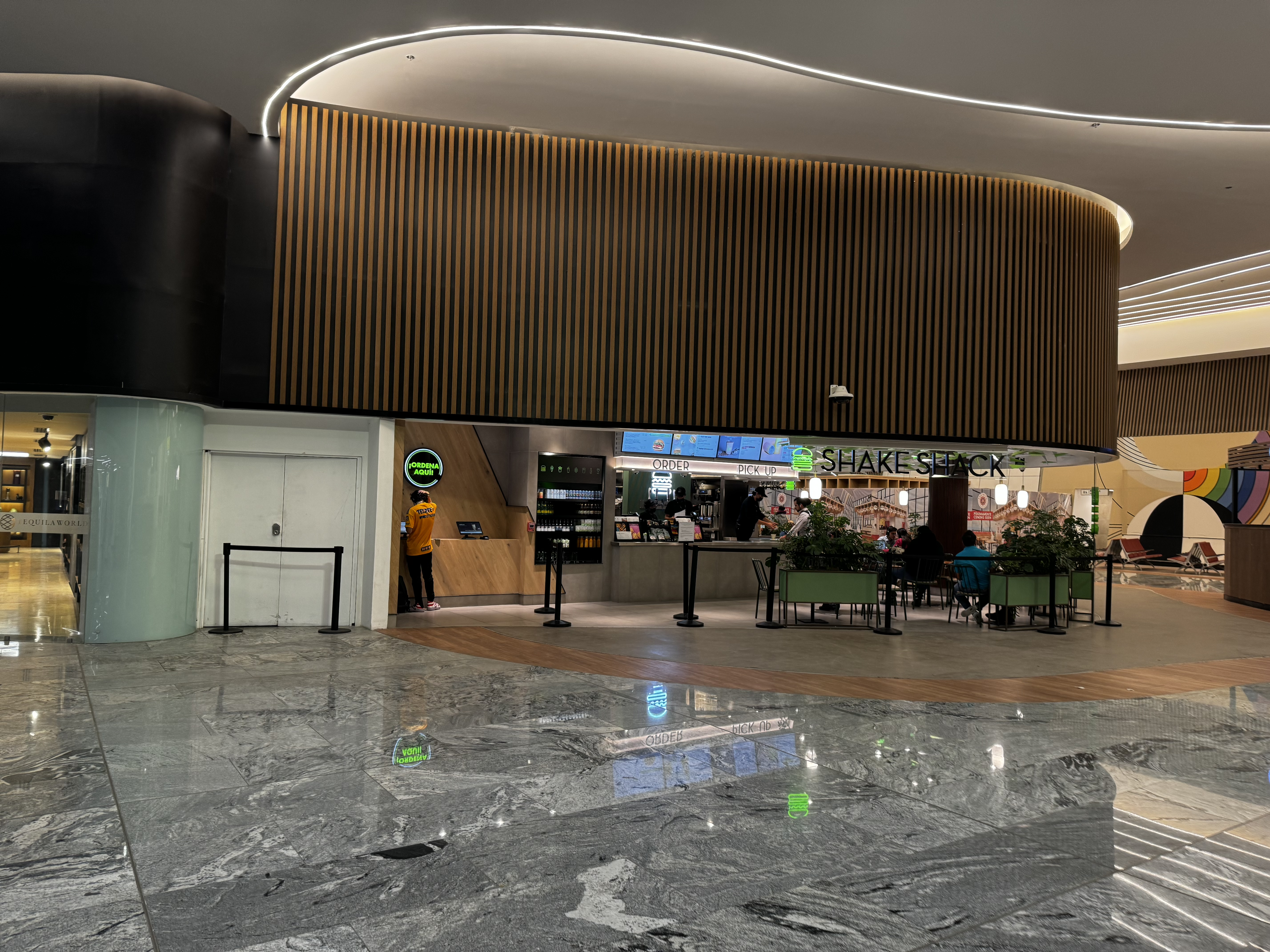
Interior of the main terminal

=== Passengers ===
Annual passenger traffic
| Year | Passengers | % change |
|---|---|---|
| 2010 | 6,918,621 | Steady |
| 2011 | 7,154,959 | ▲3.41% |
| 2012 | 7,389,897 | ▲3.28% |
| 2013 | 8,104,762 | ▲9.67% |
| 2014 | 8,695,183 | ▲7.28% |
| 2015 | 9,758,516 | ▲12.22% |
| 2016 | 11,362,552 | ▲16.43% |
| 2017 | 12,779,874 | ▲12.47% |
| 2018 | 14,340,152 | ▲12.21% |
| 2019 | 14,823,592 | ▲3.37% |
| 2020 | 8,125,600 | ▼45.40% |
| 2021 | 12,243,000 | ▲50.7% |
| 2022 | 15,606,600 | ▲30.6% |
| 2023 | 17,710,200 | ▲13.5% |
| 2024 | 17,848,700 | ▲0.8% |
| 2025 | 18,696,600 | ▲4.8% |

=== Busiest routes ===
Busiest domestic routes from GDL (Jan–Dec 2025)
| Rank | Airport | Passengers |
|---|---|---|
| 1 | Mexico City, Mexico City | 1,368,826 |
| 2 | Tijuana, Baja California | 938,950 |
| 3 | Monterrey, Nuevo León | 570,198 |
| 4 | Cancún, Quintana Roo | 477,548 |
| 5 | Mexico City-AIFA, State of Mexico | 313,274 |
| 6 | Los Cabos, Baja California Sur | 263,658 |
| 7 | Ciudad Juárez, Chihuahua | 209,699 |
| 8 | Mexicali, Baja California | 205,692 |
| 9 | Puerto Vallarta, Jalisco | 193,408 |
| 10 | Hermosillo, Sonora | 190,248 |

Busiest international routes from GDL (Jan–Dec 2025)
| Rank | Airport | Passengers |
|---|---|---|
| 1 | Los Angeles, United States | 519,848 |
| 2 | Chicago (Midway and O'Hare, United States) (Note: The official statistics combine both Midway and O'Hare airports.) | 231,381 |
| 3 | Dallas/Fort Worth, United States | 197,592 |
| 4 | Houston–Intercontinental, United States | 183,797 |
| 5 | Oakland, United States | 181,666 |
| 6 | Fresno, United States | 172,490 |
| 7 | Las Vegas, United States | 156,394 |
| 8 | Sacramento, United States | 131,762 |
| 9 | San Jose (CA), United States | 129,070 |
| 10 | Ontario, United States | 111,903 |

;Notes

== Accidents and incidents ==
- On June 2, 1958, Aeronaves de México Flight 111, a Lockheed L-749A Constellation (registration XA-MEV), crashed into La Latilla Mountain, 16 kilometers (10 miles) from the airport, shortly after takeoff for a flight to Mexico City, after the airliner's crew failed to follow the established climb-out procedure for the airport after taking off. The crash killed all 45 people on board, and two prominent American scientists – oceanographer Townsend Cromwell and fisheries scientist Bell M. Shimada – were among the dead. It was the deadliest aviation accident in Mexican history at the time.
- On August 31, 1986, Aeroméxico Flight 498, a DC-9 originating from Mexico City made several stopovers at Guadalajara, Loreto and Tijuana. The DC-9 collided with a private aircraft while attempting to land at Los Angeles International Airport leaving no survivors.
- On May 24, 1993, Juan Jesús Posadas Ocampo, the Archbishop of Guadalajara, and six other people were killed in a shootout between rival drug cartels in the airport parking lot.
- On September 16, 1998, Continental Airlines Flight 475, a Boeing 737-500 registered N20643 departed Houston–Intercontinental at 20:56 CDT for an IFR flight to Guadalajara. After executing a missed approach on their first ILS approach to Runway 28, the flight was vectored for a second approach to Runway 28. Second approach was reported by both pilots to be uneventful, the aircraft drifted to the left side of the runway after touchdown. Left main landing gear exited the hard surface of the runway approximately 2700 feet from the threshold and eventually, all 3 landing gears exited the 197-foot wide asphalt runway while the aircraft had substantial damages and was declared damaged beyond repair, all passengers survived.

== See also ==
- List of the busiest airports in Mexico
- List of airports in Mexico
- List of airports by ICAO code: M
- List of busiest airports in North America
- List of the busiest airports in Latin America
- Transportation in Mexico
- Grupo Aeroportuario del Pacífico
- Zapopan Air Force Base
- Economy of Jalisco
- Tlajomulco de Zúñiga
- List of longest runways
