= Sacramento International Airport =

International airport serving Sacramento, California, United States

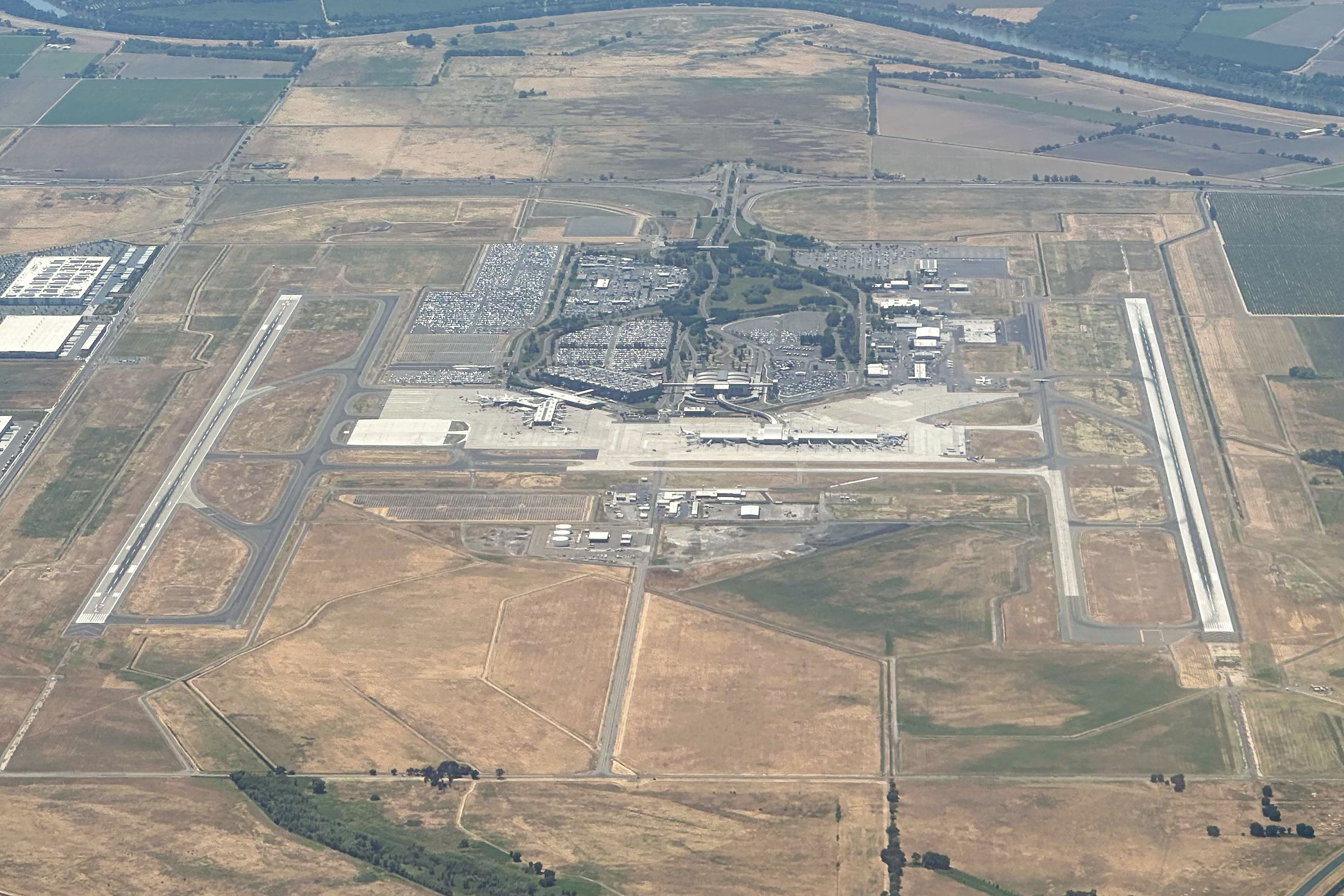
- IATA: SMF; ICAO: KSMF; FAA LID: SMF

Summary
- Airport type: Public
- Owner: County of Sacramento
- Operator: Sacramento County Airport System
- Serves: Sacramento metropolitan area
- Location: Sacramento, California, U.S.
- Opened: October 21, 1967; 59 years ago
- Elevation AMSL: 27 ft (8.2 m)
- Coordinates: 38°41′44″N 121°35′27″W
- Website: www.flysmf.gov

Maps
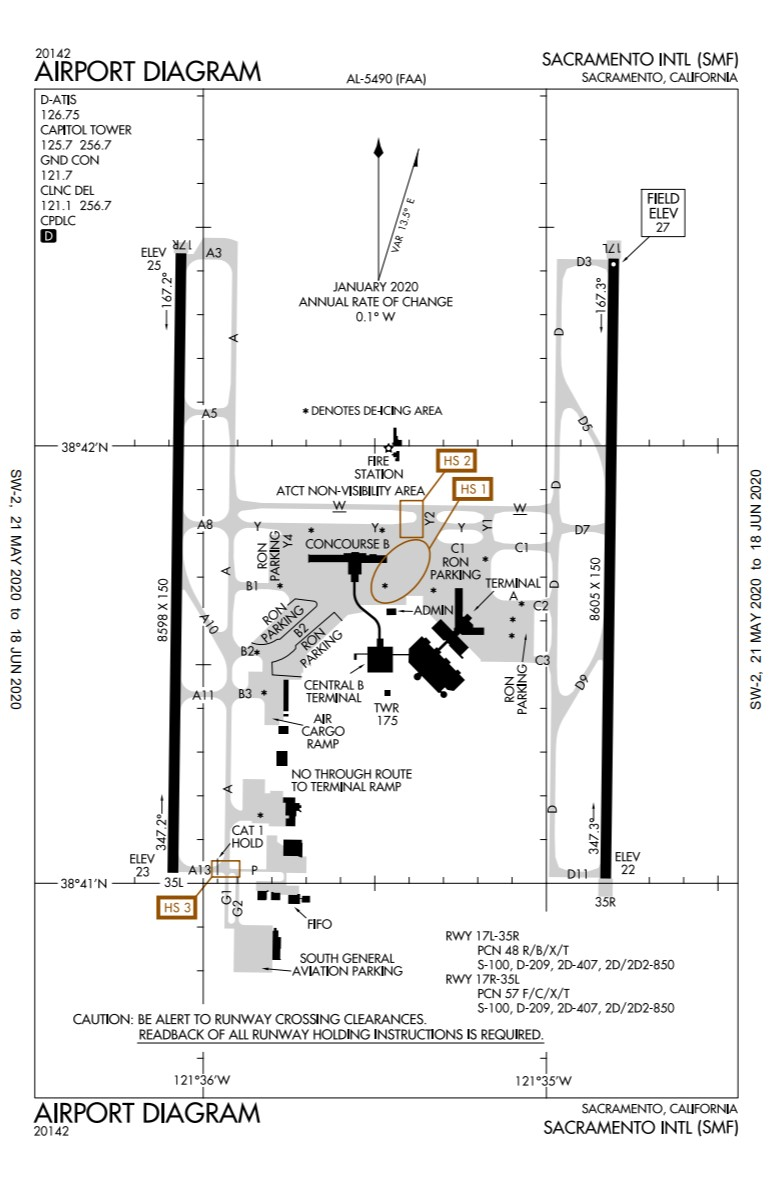
- FAA airport diagram
- Interactive map of Sacramento International Airport

Runways
Direction	Length		Surface
Direction	ft	m	Surface
17L/35R	8,605	2,623	Concrete
17R/35L	8,598	2,621	Concrete

Statistics (2025)
- Passengers: ▲13,912,718
- Aircraft operations: ▼86,158
- Total freight and mail (lbs.): ▲223,511,829
- Source: Federal Aviation Administration

Sacramento International Airport (IATA: SMF, ICAO: KSMF, FAA LID: SMF) is an international airport located in Sacramento, California, 10.5 mi (16.9 km) northwest of Downtown Sacramento and covers 6,000 acres (2,400 ha). It is the primary airport serving the Sacramento Metropolitan Area, and it is run by the Sacramento County Airport System. The airport is one of 4 airports serving Sacramento, the others being Sacramento Mather Airport, Sacramento Executive Airport, and Franklin Field.

The airport is also a gateway to various attractions in Northern and Central California, such as Heavenly Mountain Resort, Lake Tahoe, Yosemite National Park, Old Sacramento State Historic Park, California State Capitol, Wine Country, Yolo Bypass Wildlife Area, Cosumnes River Preserve, Sutter's Mill and Marshall Gold Discovery State Historic Park and Sacramento–San Joaquin River Delta.

Excluding all military type airfields, cargo and general aviation only airports, SMF Airport, at 6,000 acres (9.4 sq mi; 24.3 km^{2}) is the largest commercial/public airport in the entire state of California in terms of land area.

== History ==
Sacramento International Airport (SMF) opened on October 21, 1967, as Sacramento Metropolitan Airport (the airfield itself was Sacramento Metropolitan Field), with one 8600-foot runway. The initial runway was on the west side of the airfield and is now named to the headings of 17R/35L. Previously, air service to Sacramento was handled by Sacramento Municipal Airport (SAC), now known as Sacramento Executive Airport. Sacramento Metropolitan was the first purpose-built public-use airport west of the Mississippi when it opened in 1967. All airports under the Sacramento County Airport System (previously the Sacramento County Department of Airports), including SMF, are self-supporting through user fees and rentals. No local, state or federal tax funds are used for operating costs.

The airport initially had five airlines: Pacific Air Lines, Pacific Southwest Airlines (PSA), United Airlines, Western Airlines and West Coast Airlines.

=== 1980s and 1990s ===
In the 1980s, SMF added: the in-flight catering facility (1980), an FAA Flight Inspection Field Office (1985), a second air cargo facility (1985) and the east runway (1987). The east runway's opening was celebrated by the landing of a Concorde SST. America West Airlines, Continental Airlines, Morris Air, Northwest Airlines and American Eagle Airlines joined the original carriers at Sacramento Metropolitan Airport during this time.

In 1998, the consolidated rental car facility and Terminal A (designed by Dreyfuss & Blackford Architects) opened. The consolidated rental car terminal was the first of its kind in the nation and gave all rental car customers a single point of access that could be reached on a single shuttle. This innovation streamlined bus operations to reduce congestion at the terminal and improve air quality while enhancing customer service.

With the opening of the new Terminal A, the airport was renamed Sacramento International Airport, though it did not receive international flights until 2002 when Mexicana started nonstops to Guadalajara. The airport was designated a port of entry on October 5, 2006.

The Sacramento County Airport System launched its website in April 1997.

Southwest Airlines (1991), Alaska Airlines (1993), Horizon Air (1993) and Trans World Airlines (TWA) (1994) were added to the list of carriers at Sacramento. Southwest and Alaska Airlines grew quickly, offsetting the departure of airlines such as American Eagle, Continental and USAir which had acquired PSA.

=== 21st century: New challenges, opportunities and growth ===
September 11 did not deter growth at Sacramento International Airport. Four airlines were soon added to Sacramento International: Continental returned (2000) and Frontier Airlines (2002), Mexicana Airlines (2002), Hawaiian Airlines (2002) and Aloha Airlines (2003) initiated service. Mexicana's arrival initiated international nonstop flights and necessitated the completion of the International Arrivals Building for federal inspection services.

Terminal B

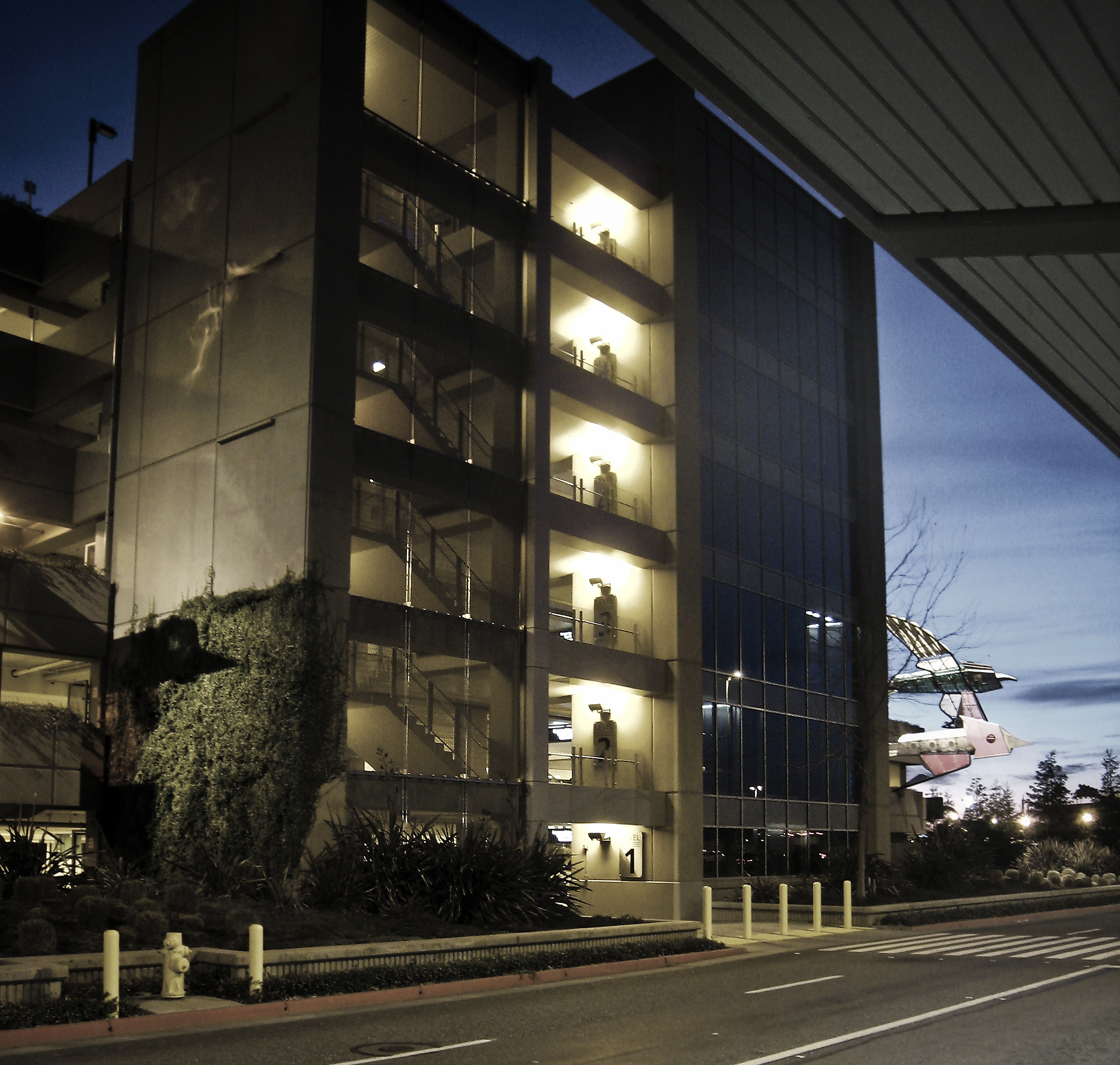
Parking garage

The Terminal A Parking Garage opened on September 23, 2004. The six-story structure had covered parking, a short walk to the terminal and public art ("Flying Gardens" by Dennis Oppenheim) installed outside the garage, and "Flying Carpet" by Seyed Alavi, installed in the connecting walkway.

In 2006, Sacramento International Airport was one of the first airports in the nation to offer free wireless Internet service (WiFi).

==== Industry churn ====
As the nation's economy was taking a hit in 2008, commercial aviation was challenged by reduced passenger numbers and increasing fuel and other costs.

Prior to the downturn, new services began and several airlines merged. America West and US Airways merged, Northwest and Delta merged, and United and Continental initiated their merger by the end of 2011. Despite these challenges, Alaska added nonstop flights to Guadalajara, Mexico (now discontinued), and Hawaii (Maui) while Aeromexico's (2011) debut reestablished foreign-flag service with daily nonstops to Guadalajara, Mexico. The new Terminal B opened on October 6, 2011, the largest airport terminal in the United States to achieve LEED Silver status.

On June 5, 2008 US Airways began seasonal flights to Charlotte and Philadelphia. Sacramento was the origin for the last scheduled MD-80 flight on Alaska Airlines, Flight 363 from Sacramento to Seattle on August 24, 2008. In the summer of 2010, Delta Air Lines began seasonal flights to Detroit. Continental Airlines, which later merged with United Airlines, previously had seasonal flights to Newark. Sacramento's seasonal route operated during the summer and fall. On January 6, 2013, Frontier Airlines ended service to Denver. In January 2019, Hawaiian Airlines retired its final Boeing 767-300ER aircraft when Flight 19 arrived at Honolulu from Sacramento, after which the Sacramento–Honolulu route was operated using Airbus A330 aircraft.

Sacramento County tried (and failed) to entice Virgin America into adding a flight between SMF and Los Angeles by offering the airline $400,000 to operate out of terminal A or $150,000 to operate in terminal B; other airports were also trying to entice the airline.

==== Recent developments ====
On July 6, 2013, the airport was one of ten airports that hosted flights diverted from San Francisco International Airport after Asiana Airlines Flight 214 crashed short of the runway.

On December 17, 2013, Aeroméxico began seasonal service to Del Bajío International Airport.

On November 18, 2014, United Airlines announced it would suspend service to Washington D.C. from January 6, 2015, to April 6, 2015, citing seasonal demand. On May 4, 2015 Delta Air Lines started service to Seattle–Tacoma with the flights operated by SkyWest Airlines. On December 3, 2014, United Express ended service to Arcata/Eureka and Crescent City. On February 9, 2015, SeaPort Airlines began service to Visalia. On June 18, 2015, JetBlue Airways started seasonal service to Boston. On April 8, 2015, Southwest Airlines started service to Dallas–Love. They also announced (later in the year) service to Boise beginning January 6, 2016. On March 26, 2015, Aeroméxico started service to Mexico City. In the month of May, American Airlines added a fifth flight to Dallas Fort-Worth.

On April 23, 2015, the airport announced that it had posted twelve consecutive months of improved passenger traffic that started in April 2014, and 8.9 million passengers were served in 2014. Passenger growth continued in 2015 and 2016, with 9.6 million passengers served in 2015 and 10.1 million in 2016. In 2017, the airport surpassed its 2007 high of 10.7 million passengers, with 10.9 million passengers. Amongst the 35 largest metropolitan regions in the country, Sacramento has the fewest international flights.

In 2016, American Airlines announced that it would begin flying between Sacramento and Chicago O'Hare beginning in June with twice daily flights for the summer season and a single nonstop the rest of the year.

In 2017, Southwest added nonstop service to Long Beach and Spokane, Air Canada resumed its nonstop service to Vancouver, and United added nonstop service to Newark.

In 2018, Southwest added nonstop service to Austin, New Orleans, Orlando, San Jose del Cabo, and St. Louis.

By 2019, Southwest added much-awaited service to Honolulu and Kahului, exemplifying the evolution and growth of Sacramento International Airport as well as its burgeoning route network offerings, especially in the 2010s.

On June 15, 2023, the Sacramento County Department of Airports announced funding had been secured for the construction of a new air traffic control tower to replace the original tower that had been in place since the airport opened in 1967. The new tower will be constructed at a site located on the north side of the Airport. It will stand 192-feet in height and the current cost estimate is between $60 million and $80 million. Construction is expected to finish by 2026.

=== Solar power ===
In January 2018, Sacramento International Airport's solar array was commissioned; it is rated at 7.9 MW and will supply around 30% of the airport's electricity needs. The electricity will be purchased by NRG Energy for an agreed period of 25 years. The project was built by Borrego Solar using LG solar panels at a cost of $15 million. The solar power costs 7 cents per kWh as opposed to 9 cents, so the airport expects to save nearly $1 million annually.

=== SMForward and potential new terminal ===
On February 1, 2023, the airport announced a $1.3 Billion dollar expansion that would surpass the Big Build project as the largest expansion in the airport's history. Called SMForward, this expansion covers the first 5 years of expansion that will ultimately lead to the completion of the 20 year Master Plan envisioned in 2020. Over the next five years, the airport plans to build complete the following:

- Building modifications that will add three new gates. Two new gates in Concourse B and one new gate in Terminal A. Construction started in July 2024 and to be completed by spring 2025. The projected cost at $16.5 million.
- A new $140 Million pedestrian walkway that will be adjacent to the Automated People Mover (APM) that can be used as an alternative to the APM and can connect passengers to a potential Concourse C. Construction started in the summer of 2024 and to be completed in the Spring of 2026.
- A concourse expansion that will add another 6 to 8 new gates on the western side of Terminal B. Construction is expected to begin 4th quarter of 2025 and be complete in the 4th quarter of 2028.
- An expansion of the Terminal A lobby to add a new baggage claim carousel and additional ticketing space. Construction is expected to begin in the 2nd quarter of 2026 and be complete in the spring of 2027.
- A new 5,500 space parking garage that will replace a parking lot adjacent to Terminal B. Construction started in the Fall 2024 and to be completed by the 4th quarter of 2026.
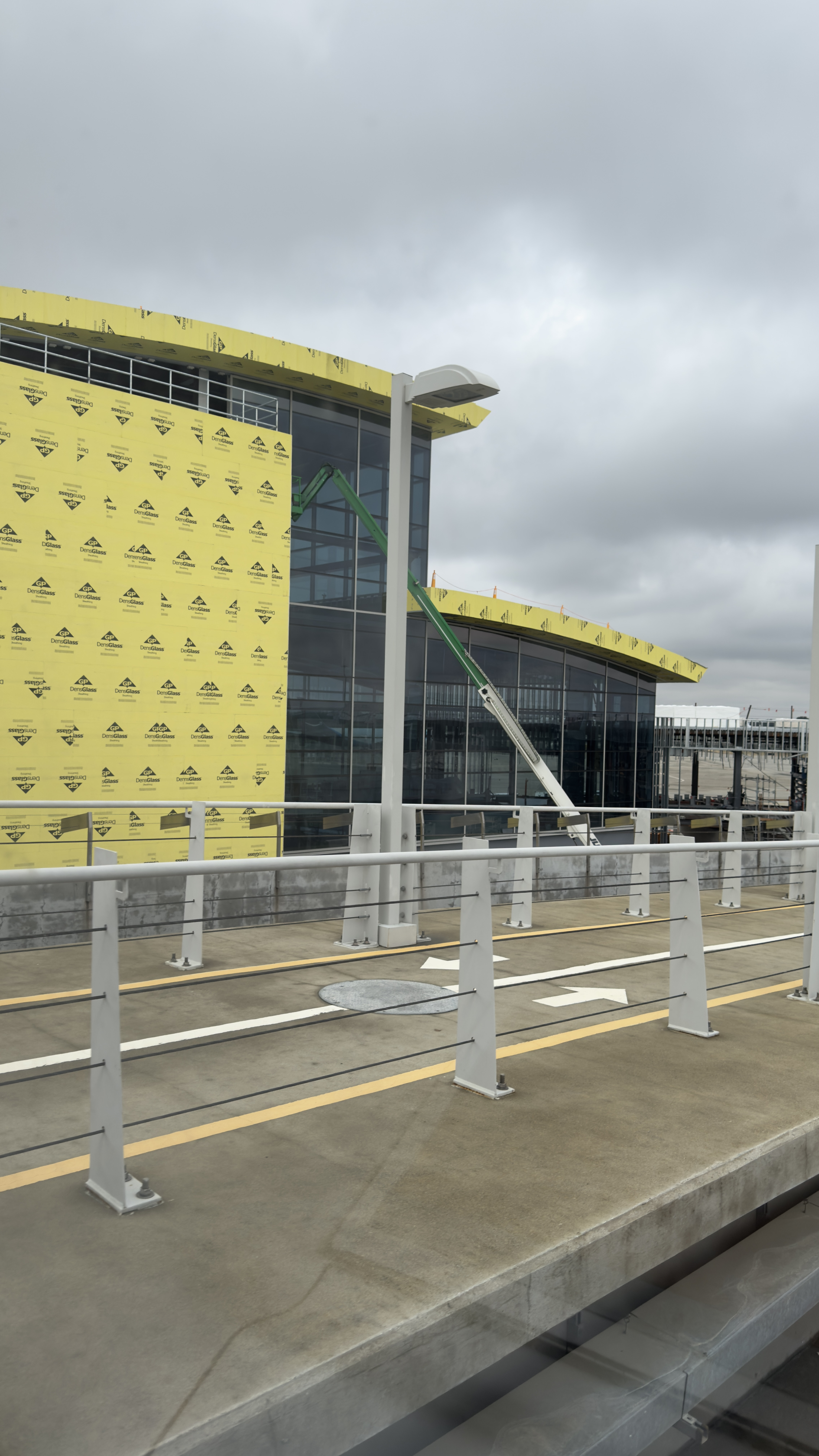
  Terminal B walkway under construction.
- A $55 Million consolidated transportation ground transportation center that will allow ride-share services, taxis, and shuttles to serve both Terminals. Construction is expected to start in the summer of 2026 and be complete by the summer of 2027.
- New Terminal A exit road for a better flow to traffic and a more efficient shuttle system. Construction is expected to start on the 3rd quarter 2025 and be complete by the 3rd quarter 2026.
- A $390 Million rental car facility south of the parking garage adjacent to Terminal A. This will allow passengers to walk from either Terminal to access the rental car service. Construction is expected to start N/A and be complete by N/A.

The current version of the 2020 Master Plan calls for SMF to expand and add up to 18 more new gates to existing Terminals A and B, including the proposed six to eight gates proposed with SMForward, or to construct a new Terminal C that would contain 12 gates. At buildout, SMF is expected to have 50 gates over two or three Terminals. Future expansion plans include an extension of the Green Line to the airport, connecting passengers to Downtown Sacramento and a long-standing proposal to extend one of the airport's runways to 11,000 feet (3,400 meters) to support long-haul international flights, as well as the relocation of certain key taxiways.

In mid-2024, construction began on the pedestrian walkway connecting Terminal B to Concourse B. Preparation for the new parking garage to the west of Terminal B also started, with the current Daily B parking lot being closed to passengers.

== Facilities ==
SMF diagram (pre-2020)

Sacramento International Airport covers 6,000 acres (2,400 ha) and has two parallel runways:

- 17L/35R: 8,605 ft × 150 ft (2,623 m × 46 m), concrete
- 17R/35L: 8,598 ft × 150 ft (2,621 m × 46 m), concrete

The runways were redesignated 17/35 from 16/34 on May 20, 2020.

The west runway, 17R/35L, was closed from April 2019 to October 23, 2019, for a renovation which replaced the asphalt with concrete

When winds are from the south (about 70% of the year), the airfield operates in "South Flow", with arrivals and departures on runways 17R and 17L. Arrivals from the south fly past the west side of the airport before turning 180 degrees and landing on 17L or 17R. This is done so that arriving aircraft clear departing aircraft, which generally turn southeast after departing.

During the other 30% of the year (typically between the fall and spring), the airfield operates in "North Flow", with arrivals and departures on runways 35L and 35R. As in South Flow, departing aircraft generally turn east to southeast immediately after taking off, so arrivals from the north pass west of the airport before turning north to land. Residences near SMF are typically south and east of the airport, so North Flow is preferred at night (between 2145 and 0745 local time), conditions permitting, to route flights over agricultural land.

== Terminals ==
SMF terminals; note curved people mover track between airside and landside sections of Terminal B

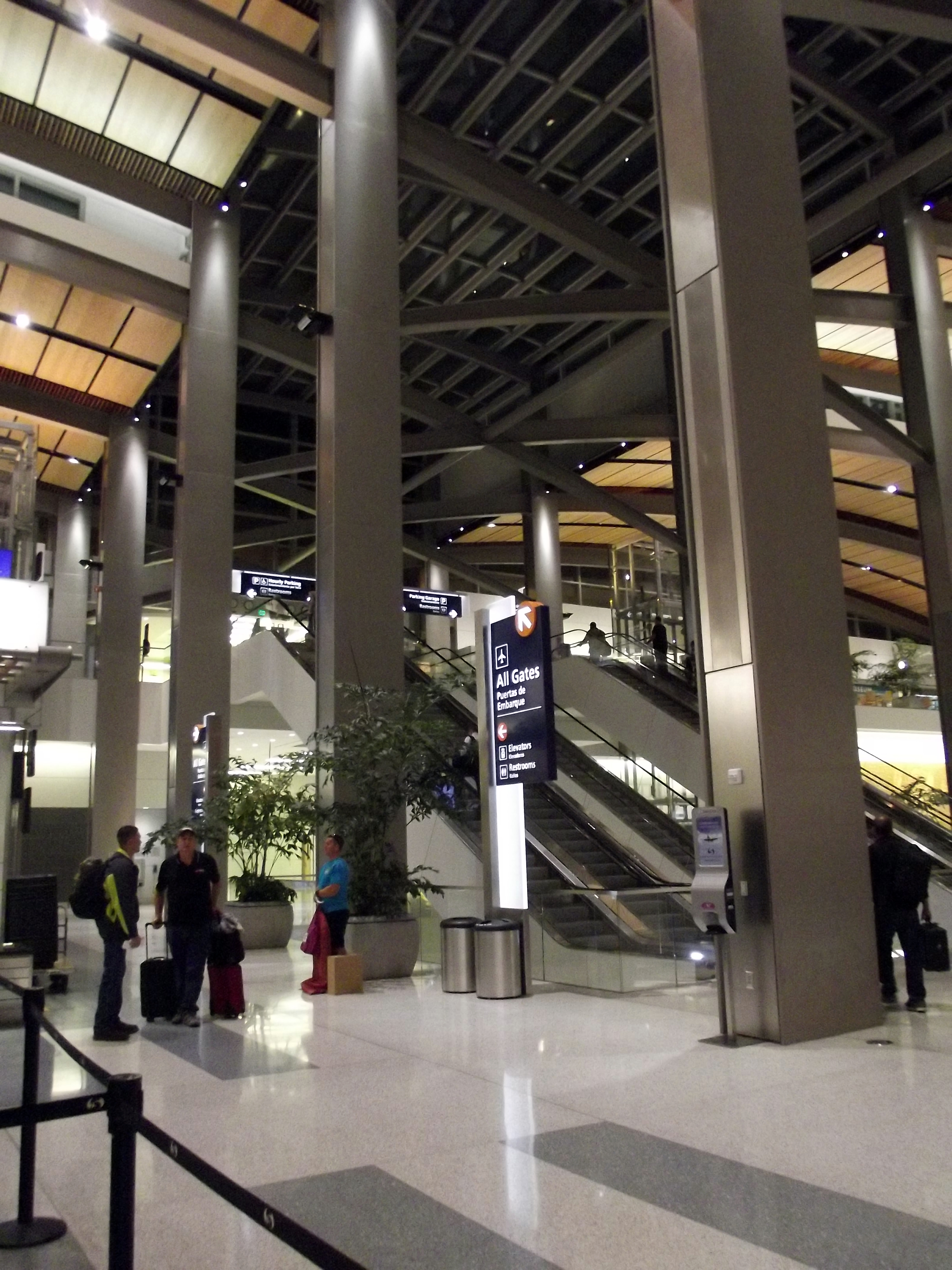
Terminal B departures hall

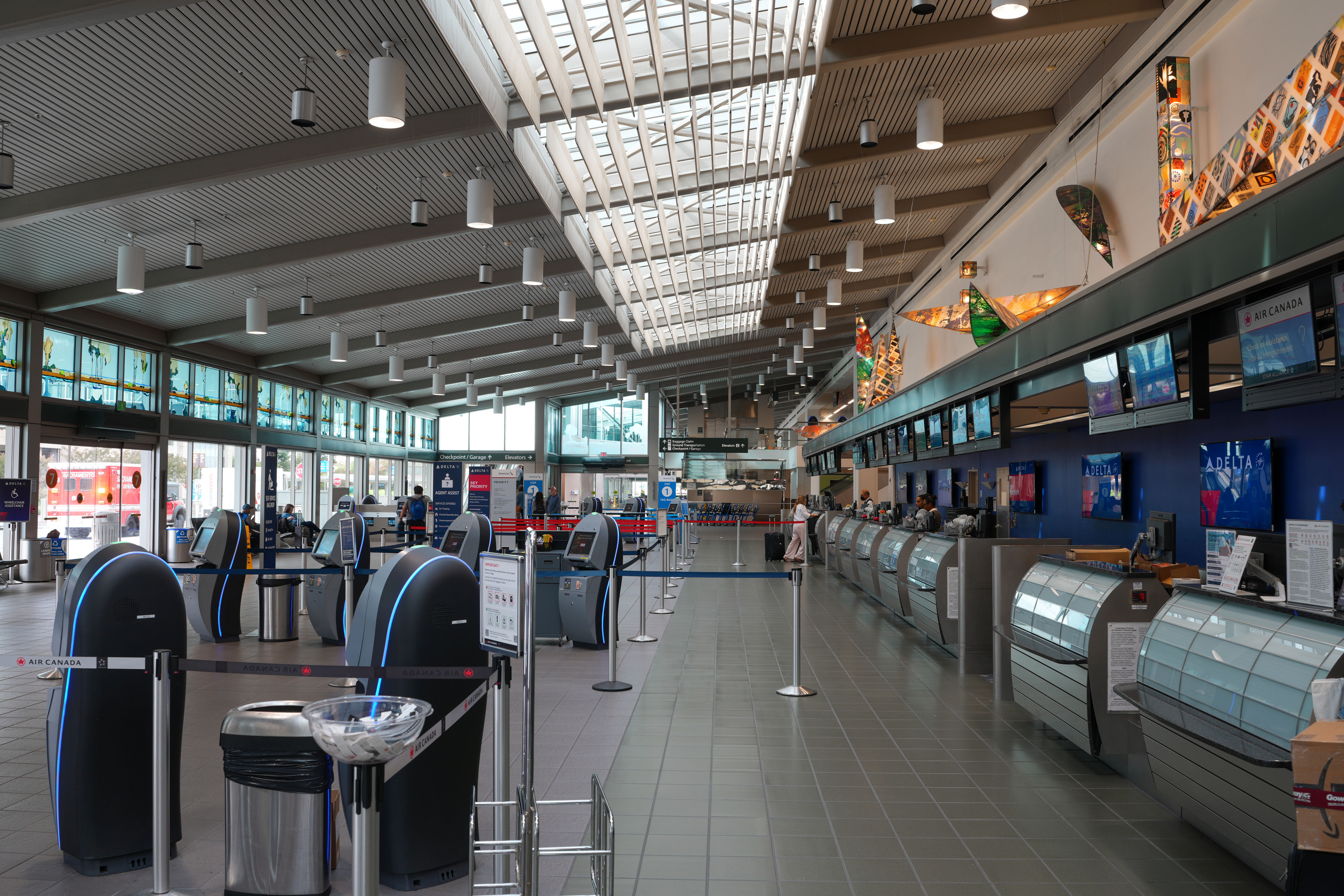
Terminal A departures hall

The airport has two terminals, Terminal A, with 13 gates; and Terminal B, with 19 gates; totaling 32 gates. The old Terminal B had 14 gates. 7 airlines operate out of Terminal B and 4 airlines operate out of Terminal A. All indoor public areas have free wi-fi (wireless Internet) provided by the Sacramento County Airport System.

Dreyfuss + Blackford Architecture has been the Architect of Record for SMF since its inception. The original Terminal B (1967) and Terminal A (1998) were designed by Dreyfuss + Blackford, and they served as the local architect for the new Central Terminal B (landside building, 2011) with Corgan Associates and Fentress Architects.

A Hyatt Place hotel is planned to be built between the two current terminals. Previously, the onsite Host Hotel was demolished in 2008 during construction the new Terminal B. An onsite hotel was proposed for Terminal B, but plans were temporarily dropped during the economic downturn of 2008, although subsequent economic regeneration and aviation growth have since revitalized such plans.

Sacramento County Airport System has rolled out an advertising campaign dubbed "Easy as SMF" to tout the convenience of flying through SMF for residents on the eastern edge of the San Francisco Bay Area. Due to the Terminal B rebuild, until recently SMF charged some of the highest fees for airlines, which discouraged some carriers from operating through SMF, although SMF has since regained its reputation as a relatively budget-friendly airport, with extensive service by low-cost carriers, such as Frontier. The Oakland and San Francisco airports attract Sacramento-area residents seeking lower fares and more destinations.

=== Terminal A ===
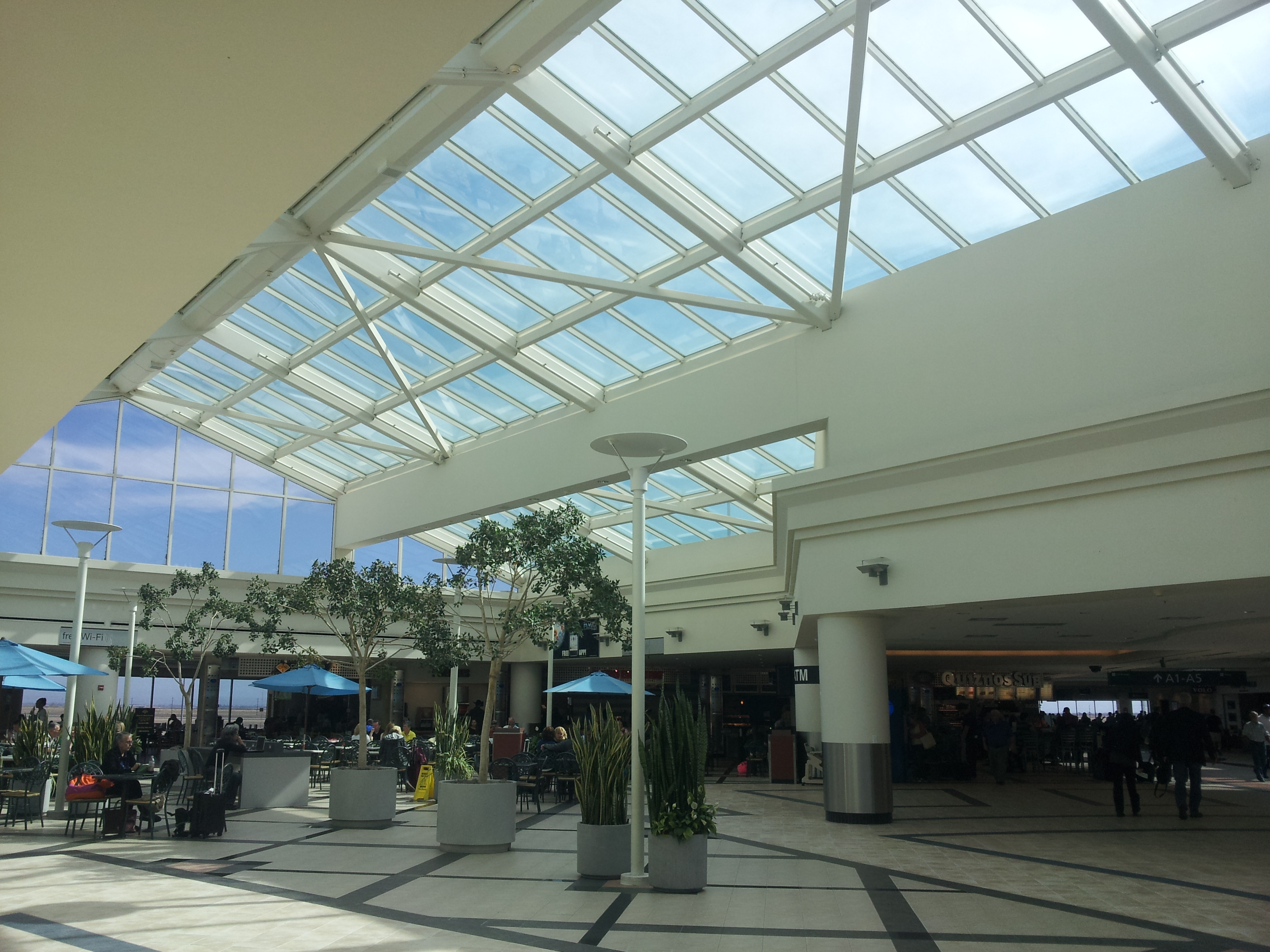
Central atrium at Terminal A

Air Canada, American, Delta, and United operate out of the thirteen gates in Terminal A.

Terminal A opened in 1998 with 275,000 ft^{2} (25,500 m^{2}) of floor space and 12 gates, able to accommodate expansion to 22 gates. The food court in Terminal A was remodeled in 2014–15 in an effort to bring a similar customer experience with unique-to-Sacramento restaurants as provided in Terminal B. Also, the airport re-opened another gate in Terminal A and opened, on March 18, 2021, new gate A13, bringing the total back to 13 gates. Future expansion at Terminal A may include conversion to an airside concourse and the addition of a second automated people mover.

In 2024, a pair of new escalators were added to Terminal A. They connect the second floor to baggage claim and are adjacent to the exit of the sterile area.

=== Terminal B ===
Aeromexico, Alaska, Frontier, Hawaiian, JetBlue, Southwest, and Volaris are located in the nineteen gates in Terminal B.

The old Terminal B was built in 1967 as the main terminal building for the new Sacramento Metropolitan Airport with 14 gates before being demolished in 2012. The newer and bigger rebuilt Terminal B was completed and opened in 2011 with 19 gates, but the original plan was supposed to be 22 gates in total due to the high costs. Dreyfuss + Blackford, the original architects, also designed a renovation and expansion completed in 1999. By that time, Terminal A was complete and frequent travelers described the 1967 Terminal B as "often overcrowded with waiting travelers."

==== Expansion project ====
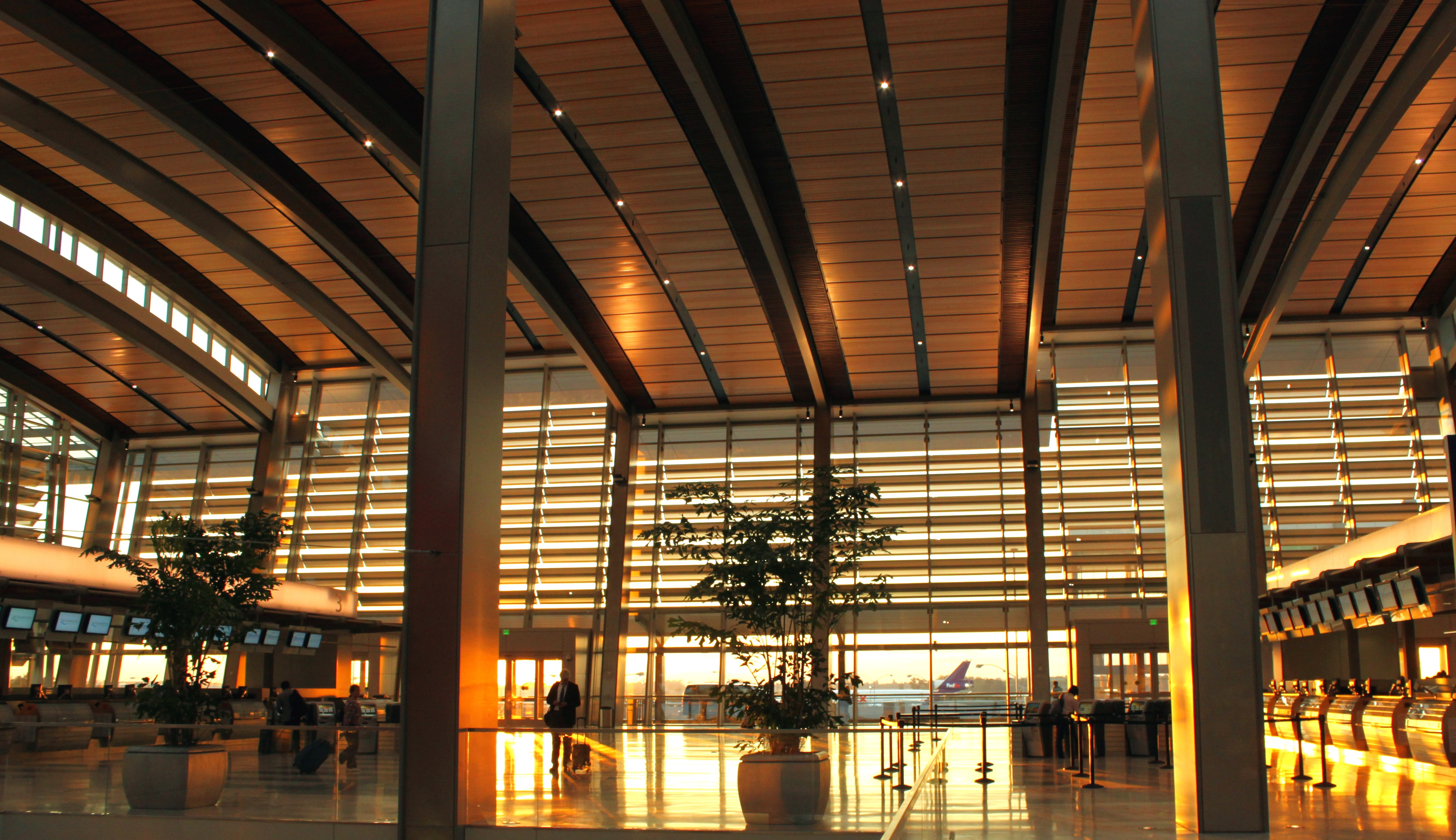
New Terminal B lobby

On June 7, 2006, plans were announced to replace Terminal B with a brand new terminal by the year 2012. In 2008, the Sacramento County Airport System broke ground on the largest capital improvement project in the history of the County of Sacramento: "The Big Build." The expanded Terminal B was designed by Corgan Associates, Inc. in association with Fentress Architects. The landside (pre-security) portion of Terminal B was built by the joint venture of Austin Commercial, LP and Walsh Construction, and the glass and aluminum facade was constructed by AGA (Architectural Glass and Aluminum). The airside gates and people mover were built by Turner Construction. The $1.03 billion terminal modernization project replaced the airport's original, aging Terminal B to meet the rising demand for passenger services and improved the airport's ability to attract new carriers and routes.

The Central Terminal B complex is three times the size of the original Terminal B with the two parts of the complex – airside and landside – connected by an automated people mover. The elevated system opened on October 6, 2011, and is used to move passengers between the airside and landside. It uses two Bombardier Innovia APM 100 vehicles operating as single cars on two separate parallel tracks. The capacity of Terminal B is 16 million passengers per year, which is not expected to be reached until late in the 2020s. Approximately half of the $1 billion cost of the new terminal comes from a new ticket surcharge of $4.50 per passenger and parking fees.

Airport officials held a press conference on July 15, 2011, at the California State Fair, announcing the terminal would open on October 6, 2011. This was many months ahead of schedule compared to the original projected opening in 2012.

"Leap" in the Terminal B lobby

The new Central Terminal B became fully operational on October 6, 2011. Salvage and deconstruction of the International Arrivals Building and demolition of the original Terminal B was completed November 2012. Travel + Leisure named Terminal B one of the "Coolest New Airport Terminals" in 2012.

The Terminal B lobby prominently features the 2011 artwork "Leap" by Lawrence Argent, consisting of a 56-foot (17 m) long red aluminum rabbit leaping into a large granite suitcase, resulting in the unofficial nickname "the Hare-port." In total, 14 artists were commissioned at a sum cost of $6 million to create artworks for the new Terminal B, including the mixed media wood-and-crystal sculpture "Acorn Steam" by Donald Lipski (named as an anagram of "Sacramento"), the interactive "Your Words are Music to My Ears" by the collaboration Living Lenses, consisting of artists Po Shu Wang and Louise Bertelsen, a large wooden sculpture portrait entitled "The Baggage Handlers" by Christian Moeller, and a painted steel-and-glass house entitled "The House Will Not Pass for Any Color but Its Own" by Mildred Howard.

== Airlines and destinations ==
Airlines	Destinations	Refs
Aeroméxico	Seasonal: Guadalajara	
Air Canada	Seasonal: Toronto–Pearson	
Air Canada Express	Vancouver	
Alaska Airlines	Boise, Portland (OR), San Diego, Seattle/Tacoma; Seasonal: Anchorage	
American Airlines	Charlotte, Chicago–O'Hare, Dallas/Fort Worth, Phoenix–Sky Harbor	
American Eagle	Los Angeles, Phoenix–Sky Harbor	
Delta Air Lines	Atlanta, Detroit, Minneapolis/St. Paul, Salt Lake City	
Delta Connection	Los Angeles, Seattle/Tacoma	
Frontier Airlines	Denver, Las Vegas, Los Angeles	
Hawaiian Airlines	Honolulu, Kahului, Kailua-Kona, Lihue	
JetBlue	Seasonal: New York–JFK	
Southwest Airlines	Austin, Baltimore, Boise, Burbank, Chicago–Midway, Dallas–Love, Denver, Eugene, Honolulu, Houston–Hobby, Kailua-Kona, Las Vegas, Long Beach, Los Angeles, Nashville, Ontario, Orange County, Orlando, Palm Springs, Phoenix–Sky Harbor, Portland (OR), Salt Lake City, San Diego, Santa Barbara, Seattle/Tacoma, Spokane, St. Louis; Seasonal: Kahului, Kansas City, Puerto Vallarta, San José del Cabo, Tucson	
United Airlines	Chicago–O'Hare, Denver, Houston–Intercontinental, Newark, Washington–Dulles	
United Express	Los Angeles, San Francisco	
Volaris	Guadalajara, León/Del Bajío, Morelia	

== Statistics ==
=== Top destinations ===
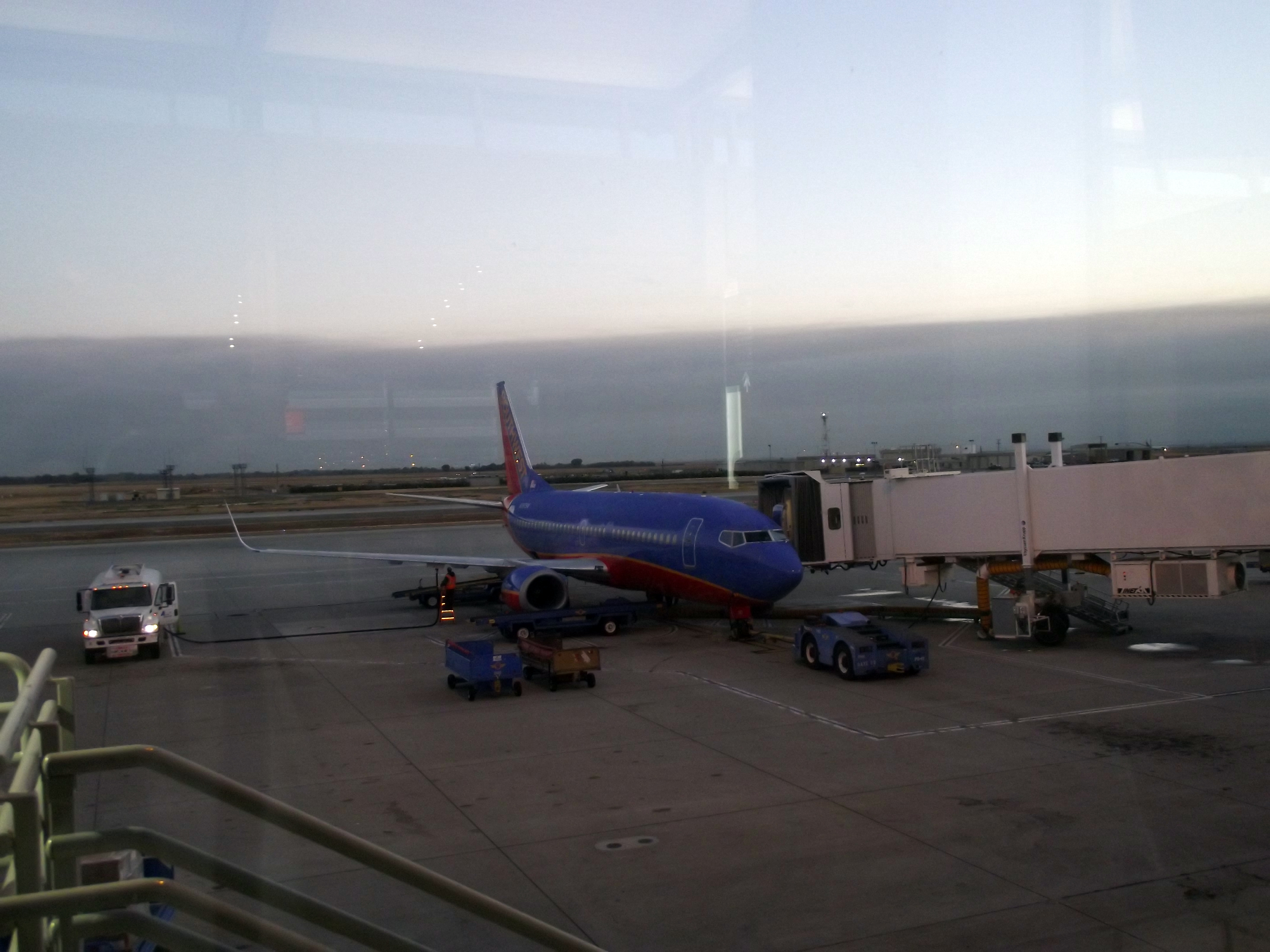
Southwest Airlines jet outside Gate 18 of Terminal B in 2014. Destination: Las Vegas.

Busiest domestic routes from SMF (September 2025 – August 2026)
Rank	City	Passengers	Carriers
1	San Diego, California	581,884	Alaska, Southwest
2	Denver, Colorado	525,898	Frontier, Southwest, United
3	Las Vegas, Nevada	488,671	Delta, Frontier, Southwest, Spirit
4	Los Angeles, California	443,600	American, Delta, Frontier, Southwest, United
5	Seattle–Tacoma, Washington	434,302	Alaska, Delta, Southwest
6	Phoenix–Sky Harbor, Arizona	421,749	American, Southwest
7	Dallas/Fort Worth, Texas	256,105	American
8	Portland, Oregon	247,794	Alaska, Southwest
9	Salt Lake City, Utah	217,058	Southwest
10	Santa Ana, California	211,467	Southwest

Busiest international routes from SMF (September 2025 – August 2026)
Rank	City	Passengers	Carriers
1	Guadalajara, Mexico	287,937	Aeromexico, Volaris
2	San Jose Del Cabo, Mexico	62,959	Alaska, Southwest
3	Morelia, Mexico	50,294	Volaris
4	Vancouver, Canada	43,883	Air Canada
5	León/Del Bajío, Mexico	34,761	Volaris
6	Mexico City–Benito Juárez, Mexico	25,599	Volaris
7	Toronto–Pearson, Canada	8,724	Air Canada
8	Puerto Vallarta, Mexico	8,086	Alaska, Southwest

=== Airline market share ===
Largest airlines at SMF (September 2025 – August 2026)
Rank	Airline	Passengers	Share
1	Southwest	7,366,860	55.0%
2	United	1,457,615	10.9%
3	Delta	1,319,660	9.9%
4	Alaska	1,198,137	9.0%
5	American	1,166,235	8.7%
	Others	875,500	6.5%

=== Annual traffic ===
Annual passenger traffic at SMF (enplaned + deplaned) 1957 through present
Year	Passengers	Year	Passengers	Year	Passengers	Year	Passengers
1957	254,861	1975	1,932,461	1993	5,322,632	2011	8,547,977
1958	269,869	1976	2,173,294	1994	5,927,896	2012	8,909,658
1959	322,508	1977	2,497,751	1995	6,704,470	2013	8,686,530
1960	339,657	1978	2,789,380	1996	6,985,784	2014	8,972,756
1961	341,838	1979	2,901,509	1997	6,967,280	2015	9,612,447
1962	360,312	1980	2,266,612	1998	7,201,378	2016	10,118,794
1963	428,593	1981	2,271,862	1999	7,554,892	2017	10,912,080
1964	494,583	1982	2,449,564	2000	7,935,046	2018	12,050,763
1965	569,291	1983	2,587,376	2001	8,036,942	2019	13,172,840
1966	627,499	1984	2,625,399	2002	8,510,924	2020	5,583,052
1967	993,448	1985	2,892,005	2003	8,778,163	2021	9,702,030
1968	1,109,402	1986	3,468,235	2004	9,580,722	2022	12,313,370
1969	1,233,762	1987	3,826,583	2005	10,203,066	2023	12,061,585
1970	1,330,311	1988	3,761,217	2006	10,362,800	2024	13,635,818
1971	1,451,911	1989	3,733,594	2007	10,767,639	2025	13,912,718
1972	1,641,831	1990	3,631,791	2008	9,844,307	2026	
1973	1,794,454	1991	4,351,964	2009	8,780,942	2027	
1974	1,903,258	1992	5,124,994	2010	8,667,338	2028	

- Source: Sacramento County Airport System: Passengers By Year.
- From 1957 to 2025, 377,992,075 passengers (enplaned+deplaned) have passed through Sacramento Int'l Airport, annual average of 5,478,146 passengers per year.

== Ground transportation ==
=== Road ===
The airport is accessed via Airport Boulevard directly from Interstate 5 at exit 528. The following can be reached via I-5 within 10 miles (16.09 km) of the airport: Interstate 80, CA-113, U.S. Route 50 and CA-99. A new entryway into the airport, which involves extending Elkhorn Boulevard from its former western terminus at Power Line Road to the Crossfield Drive/Airport Boulevard interchange, provides a direct connection from the airport to CA-99 at exit 307. The one-mile (1.6 km) extension project, which broke ground on April 29, 2023, was expected to be completed by the end of 2023, but was pushed back to 2024. Construction of the extension was eventually completed and was officially opened to traffic on May 21, 2024.

=== Public transit ===
Yolobus routes 42A (clockwise) and 42B (counter-clockwise) connect the airport with downtown Sacramento, West Sacramento, Woodland and Davis.

Sacramento Regional Transit route 142 provides non-stop service between downtown Sacramento and the airport.

Amtrak Thruway bus route 5 connects the airport with Sacramento and Redding.

==== Rail ====
The Sacramento Regional Transit District has plans for a light rail link, an extension of the Green Line, to the airport. Environmental evaluation, clearance and construction for the Green Line was projected to be complete by 2018, but funding for the project has not been secured.

After 2031, Altamont Corridor Express and Gold Runner services are expected to terminate at a nearby planned Natomas/Sacramento Airport station where buses will complete the journey to the airport.

== See also ==
Transportation in the Sacramento metropolitan area
