= ALMA de México =

Mexican low-cost airline

Aerolíneas Mesoamericanas ALMA
| IATA | ICAO | Call sign |
|---|---|---|
| C4 | MSO | ALMA |
- Founded: 2005; 21 years ago
- Commenced operations: June 12, 2006; 20 years ago
- Ceased operations: November 7, 2008; 17 years ago
- Hubs: Miguel Hidalgo y Costilla Int'l Airport
- Fleet size: 12
- Destinations: 28
- Headquarters: Guadalajara, Mexico
- Key people: Pablo Peralta (CEO)
- Website: www.alma.com.mx

Aerolíneas Mesoamericanas, S.A. de C.V., operating as ALMA de Mexico, was a low-cost airline based in Guadalajara, Mexico. It suspended all service on November 7, 2008. The airline once operated flights to more than 18 domestic destinations, with plans for international service to the United States. Its main base was Don Miguel Hidalgo y Costilla International Airport, Guadalajara.

== History ==
The airline was established in 2005 by former Aeroméxico COO Guillermo Heredia and received its air operator's certificate in September of the same year.

On June 12, 2006, ALMA launched operations with its first flight from Guadalajara to Puebla. It had already signed lease agreements with GE Commercial Aviation Services (GECAS) for further Bombardier CRJ-200 aircraft.

ALMA was awarded its (IATA Operational Safety Audit) security and safety certification on March 2, 2007.

ALMA successfully combined air travel with bus services in what it called a Multimodal service. This service was offered on the following routes:

- For any passenger flying to La Paz and travelling on to San José del Cabo or Cabo San Lucas
- For any passenger flying to Tijuana and travelling on to Ensenada or Mexicali
- For any passenger flying to Puebla with a final short trip to its center (4 Poniente) and vice versa. In this last case, there was no extra charge.

By the end of 2007, ALMA had grown its fleet to 18 aircraft and had announced plans to expand to 30 aircraft within the coming year, including two new CRJ900 aircraft on order directly from Bombardier. ALMA was then considered one of the fastest growing regional airlines in Mexico. This turned out to be the high point in the airline's history. Within months ALMA was feeling the effects of soaring fuel prices and increased competition. In early 2008 the company indefinitely deferred further aircraft deliveries and then cut capacity. By the end of the summer the fleet had dropped to just 12 aircraft.

On November 7, 2008, ALMA announced on its website that it was ceasing all operations, effective immediately, citing the global economic crisis, the increase in fuel prices and the devaluation of the Mexican peso. The airline had not made any backup plans for its booked passengers. As a result, all such customers had effectively lost their money unless they were willing to make a claim to PROFECO, which stated that any such claim could literally take years to resolve. Aeroméxico offered to reprotect passengers, but it charged 999 pesos per segment subject to G class availability.

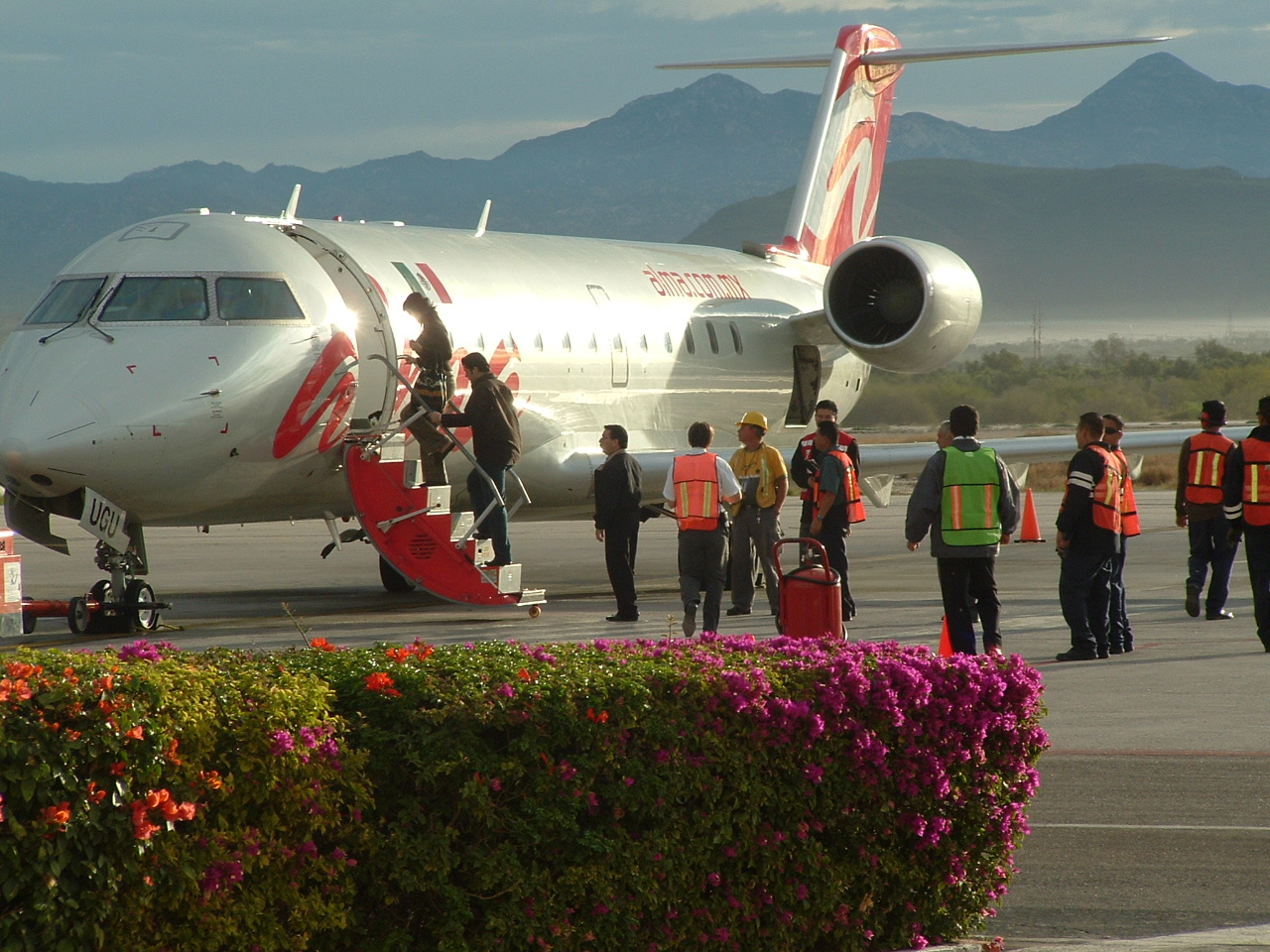
Passengers disembarking an Alma de Mexico jet at La Paz, Baja California Sur.

== Fleet ==
The ALMA de México fleet consisted of the following aircraft (as of 7 November 2008):

- 12 Bombardier CRJ200

=== On order ===
- 2 Bombardier CRJ-900 NextGen (for delivery in late 2008) the order was cancelled, when operations ceased

== Codeshare agreements ==
As of June 1, 2007, ALMA de México codeshared with the following airlines:

- Mexicana
