= Economy of Jalisco =

Since the foundation of the New Kingdom of Galicia, the Mexican state of Jalisco has established itself as a main hub in the national economy and as the business centre of the western portion of the country. Although its economic strength is mainly concentrated in the capital, Guadalajara, the rest of the state enjoys a growing prosperity in diverse economic areas. Forest products are obtained along the coast, and mining for silver, gold, mercury, copper, and precious stones is an important activity. The beverage tequila, distilled from the juice of the agave cactus, is named for the town of that name in Jalisco and is one of the state’s best-known products. Since the state is home to two UNESCO World Heritage Sites, tourism is an important economic engine. In 2006 20 million local and international tourists visited the state, contributing to an economic revenue of 25 billion pesos, 11% higher than in 2005. Guadalajara is served by one of the country’s busiest airports and is one of the state’s major tourist centres. Puerto Vallarta is a popular tourist destination among young students. The state ranks number three in terms of nominal GDP behind Nuevo León State. Since the adoption of the North American Free Trade Agreement (NAFTA) in 1994 the state has been experiencing a high rate of investment. Jalisco, like many other industrial states in the country, has evolved from a producer of cheap, low-quality goods into an exporter of sophisticated products, from auto brake systems to laptop computers. 86% of the population is urban, higher than the national average of 76%.

== Economy of Guadalajara ==
Guadalajara is one of the ten largest economic cities in Latin America in terms of GDP, third in Mexico just behind Mexico DF and Monterrey. The geographical location of the city and its communications infrastructure make it very favourable for commerce and trade with the rest of the country, and the city attracts investors and commerce worldwide. In 1987, the Expo Guadalajara Convention Centre was created and has since been recognized as the most important centre of its kind the country. Guadalajara has more than 25,000 lodging rooms.

The city is the national leader in investment of shopping malls. Many shopping centres have been built, such as Plaza Galerias, one of the largest shopping centres in Latin America. Plaza del Sol, designed by Guadalajara architect Alexander Zohn, is one of the busiest places in the city.

Guadalajara is experiencing fast-growing development. A product of the current development projects, Puerta de Hierro has become one of the most important districts in Guadalajara. Buildings in Puerta de Hierro include Aura Altitude, a project of 42 floors that has been recently finished. The construction of Andares, a shopping complex, is almost completed. More buildings are on their way in the Puerta de Hierro district, such as Torre G, Torre Zapopan and Pleyades. Providencia Country has many scheduled apartment projects.

In its 2007 survey entitled "Cities of the Future", FDi magazine ranked Guadalajara highest among major Mexican cities, and designated Guadalajara as having the second strongest economic potential of any major North American city behind Chicago. FDI Magazine also ranked the city as the most business-friendly Latin American city in 2007. Due to its economic opportunities and its high human development index, Guadalajara has been dubbed the "city of the middle class."

== Statistics ==
Jalisco - External trade in millions of dollars
Year	Exports	Imports
1994	3.01 MMD	N/D
1995	3.92 MMD	N/D
1996	5.05 MMD	N/D
1997	6.51 MMD	N/D
1998	7.76 MMD	N/D
1999	12.27 MMD	N/D
2000	14.1 MMD	16.1 MMD
2001	15.6 MMD	17.2 MMD
2002	16.2 MMD	17.6 MMD
2003	14.3 MMD	14.1 MMD
2004	14.7 MMD	18.7 MMD
2005	15.9 MMD	21.4 MMD
2006	18.5 MMD	24.2 MMD
2007	27.0 MMD	33.9 MMD

== See also ==
- List of Mexican states by GDP
