= Laredo International Airport =

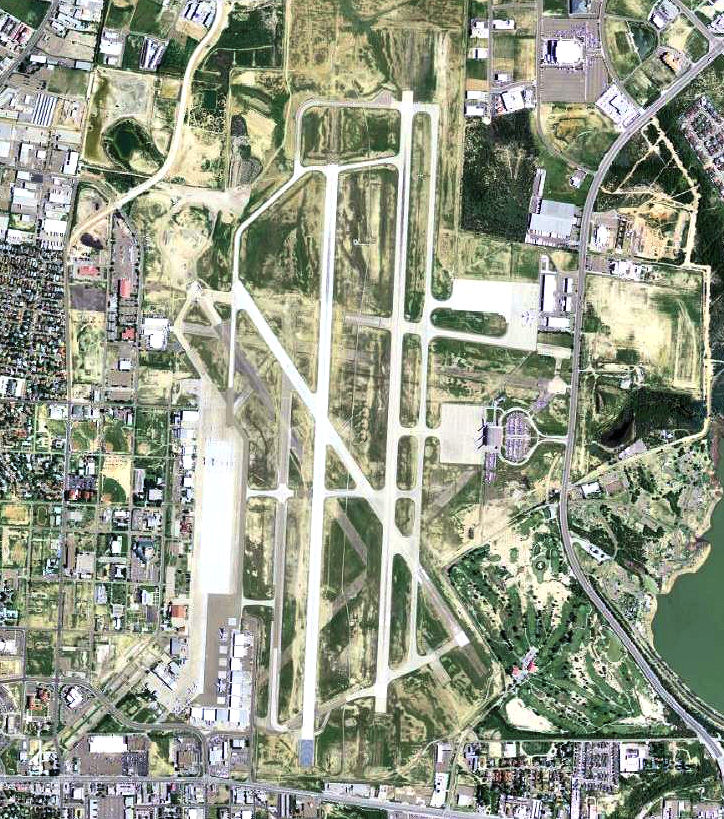
- USGS image 2006
- IATA: LRD; ICAO: KLRD; FAA LID: LRD

Summary
- Airport type: Public
- Owner: City of Laredo
- Serves: Laredo, Texas
- Elevation AMSL: 508 ft (155 m)
- Coordinates: 27°32′38″N 99°27′42″W
- Website: FlyLaredoTexas.com

Map
- Location LRD (the United States)

Runways
Direction	Length		Surface
Direction	ft	m	Surface
18L/36R	8,236	2,510	Concrete
18R/36L	8,743	2,665	Concrete
14/32	5,927	1,807	Concrete

Statistics (2025)
- Total passengers: 274,014
- Aircraft operations: 42,037
- Based aircraft: 65
- Sources: airport website and FAA

Laredo International Airport (IATA: LRD, ICAO: KLRD, FAA LID: LRD) is three miles northeast of downtown Laredo, in Webb County, Texas, United States.

The National Plan of Integrated Airport Systems for 2017–2021 categorized it as a non-hub primary commercial service airport. The airport sees three airlines with flights to Dallas, Houston, and Las Vegas. In the year ending December 2013, LRD had 102,856 passengers. In 2012, LRD totaled 460,000,612 pounds of cargo.

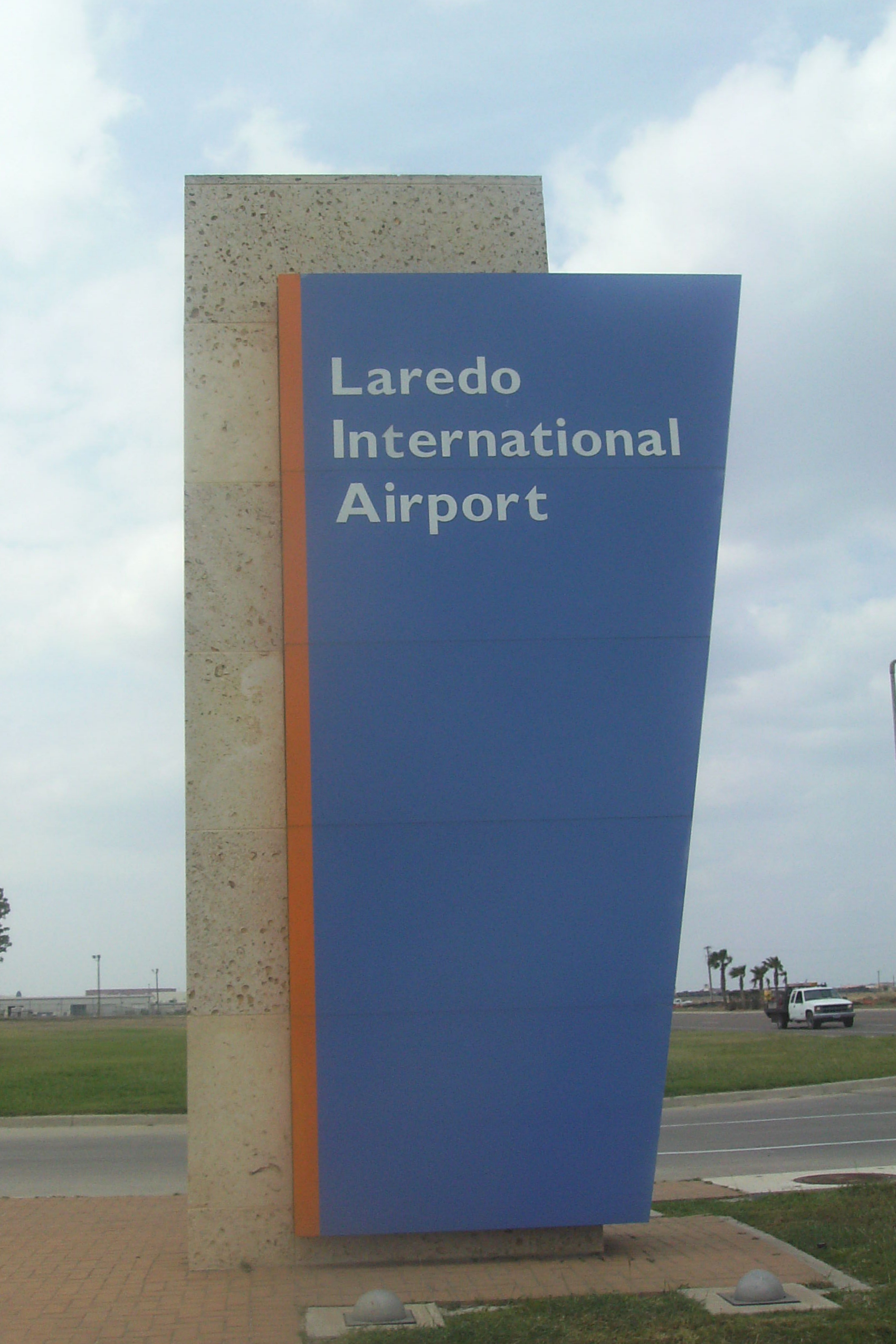
LRD entrance sign

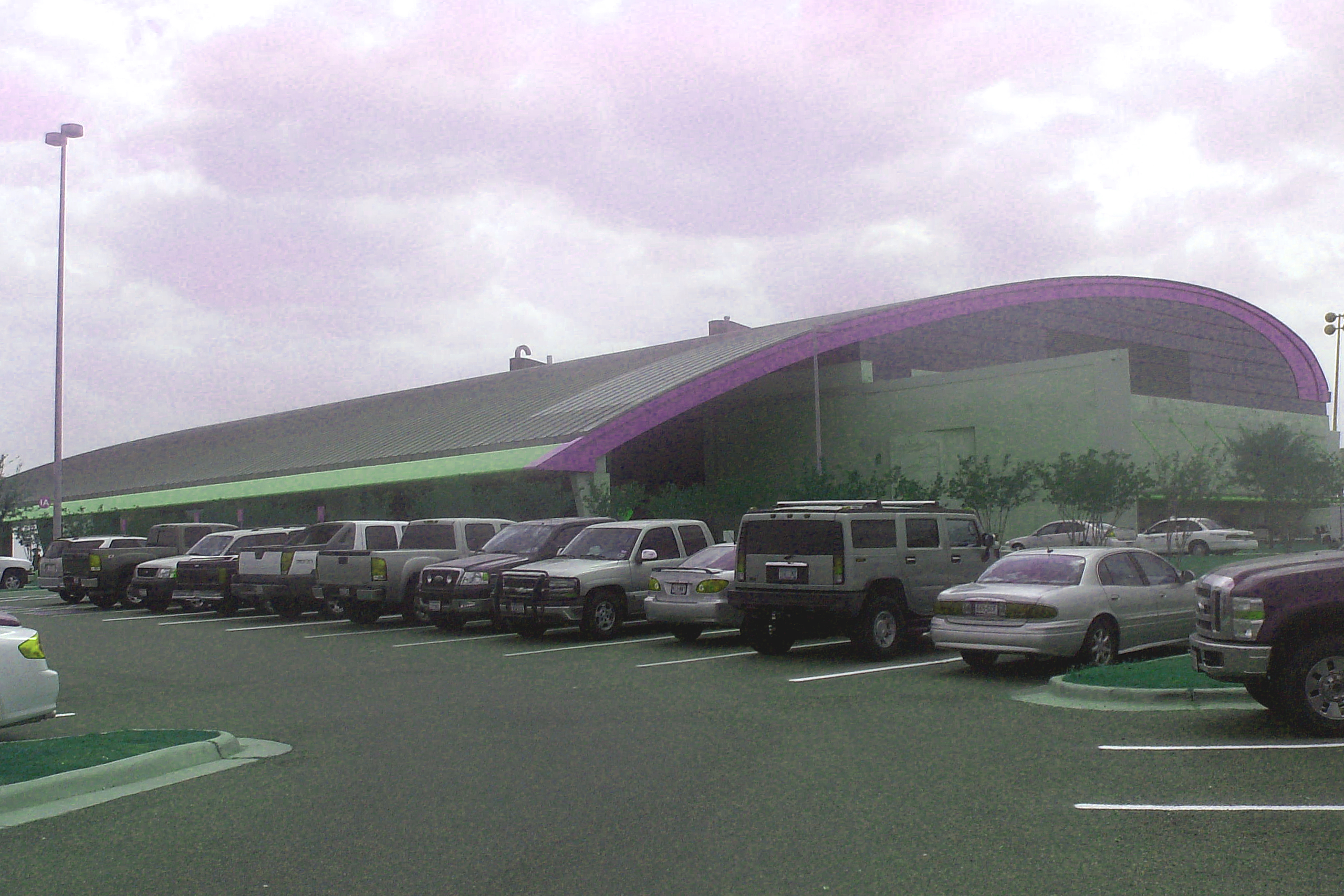
LRD passenger terminal

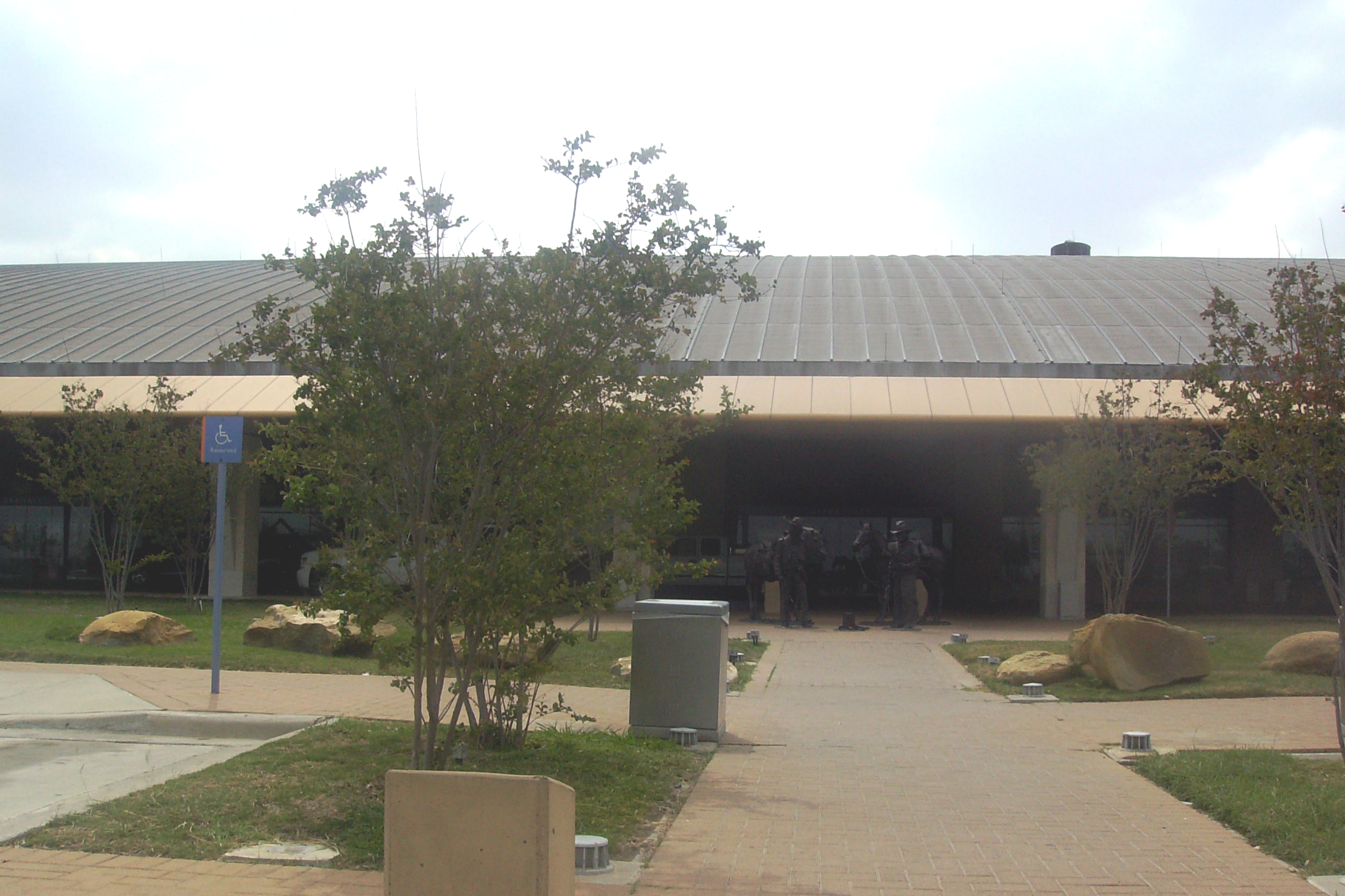
LRD terminal entrance

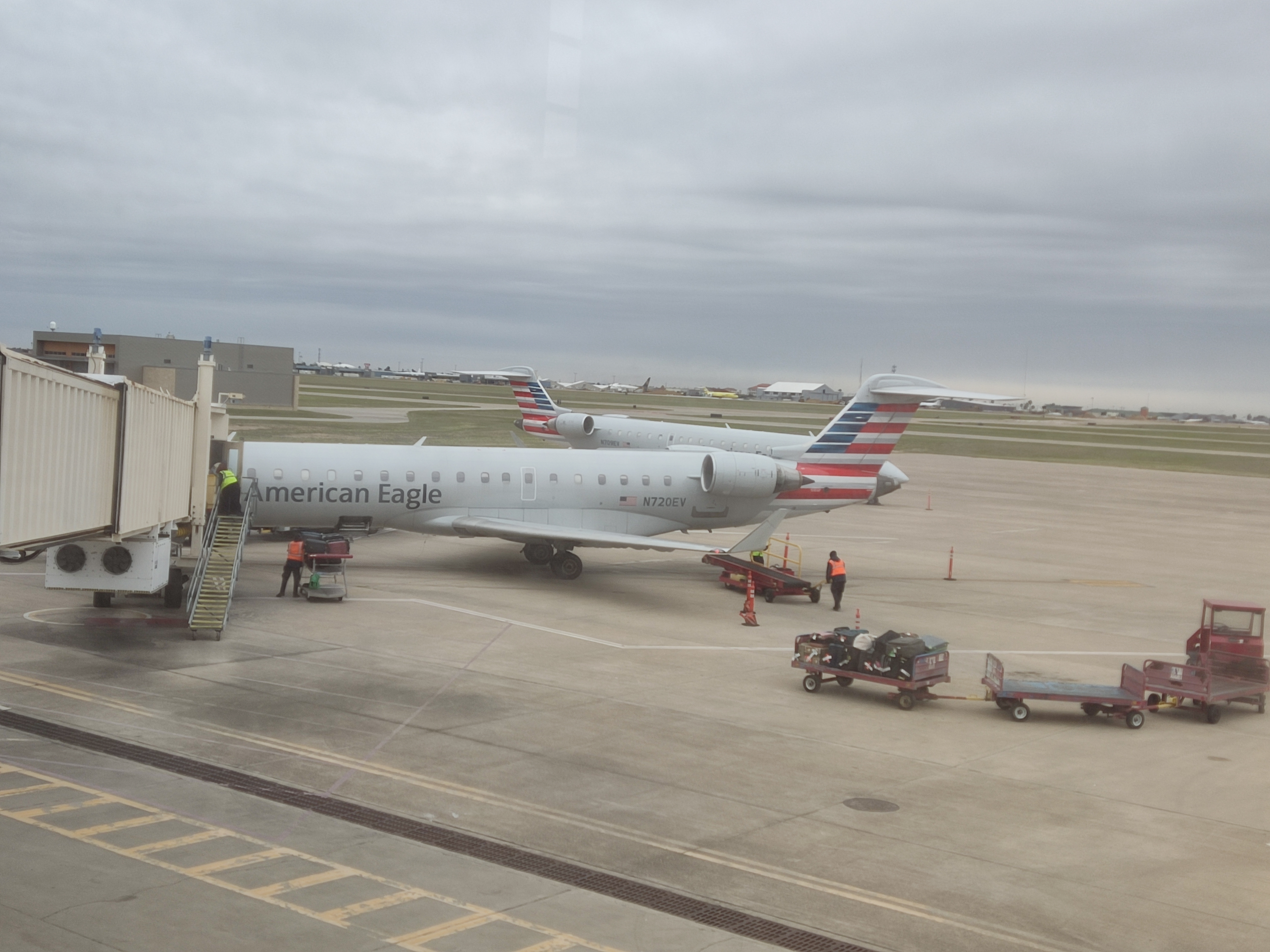
2x SkyWest operated for American Airlines Bombardier CRJ-701ER (N709EV & N720EV) at LRD

== History ==
The Laredo International Airport was used by the United States Army Air Forces during World War II as Laredo Army Airfield, and by the United States Air Force as Laredo Air Force Base during the Cold War as a pilot training base with T-33 Shooting Star and later T-37 Tweet and T-38 Talon aircraft. The military presence ended in December 1973 as part of a nationwide defense cut back after the Vietnam War. Commercial air service provided by Texas International Airlines (formerly Trans-Texas Airways) was moved from the Laredo Municipal Airport (now closed) to the Laredo International Airport in the summer of 1975. Texas International was then able to upgrade their service from Convair 600 prop aircraft to Douglas DC-9 jets. Since then several other commercial airlines and air freight carriers have used this airfield.

At the entrance to the airport is the statue Among Friends There Are No Borders, designed by Armando Hinojosa of Laredo, which depicts a South Texas vaquero and a Mexican charro sharing a campfire.

== Facilities ==
Laredo International Airport covers 1,796 acres (727 ha) at an elevation of 508 feet (155 m). It has three runways:

- 18L/36R: 8,236 x 150 ft (2,510 x 46 m), concrete
- 18R/36L: 8,743 x 150 ft (2,665 x 46 m), concrete
- 14/32: 5,927 x 150 ft (1,807 x 46 m), concrete

In the year ending September 30, 2018 the airport had 97,189 aircraft operations, an average of 266 per day: 41% military, 38% general aviation, 13% air taxi and 8% airline. In December 2019, 65 aircraft were based at this airport: 15 single-engine, 15 multi-engine, 20 jet and 15 helicopter.

There is one, two-floor terminal at the Laredo International Airport. The bottom floor has the check-in counters, a gift shop, a restaurant, baggage carousel, rental car desks, and US customs. The airport's security checkpoint and four gates, all with jetways, are on the second floor. Free Wi-Fi internet access is available throughout the terminal. Gates 3 and 4 allow direct access to US customs.

LRD sometimes receives diverted flights when severe weather threatens Dallas or Houston.

== Airlines and destinations ==
=== Passenger ===
Airlines	Destinations
Aerus	Monterrey
Allegiant Air	Las Vegas
American Eagle	Dallas/Fort Worth
United Express	Houston–Intercontinental

=== Destinations map ===
Destinations map
Destinations from Laredo International Airport
Red = Year-round destination
Green = Seasonal destination
Blue = Future destination

=== Cargo ===
Airlines	Destinations
ABX Air	Cincinnati
Aeronaves TSM	Ciudad Juárez, El Paso, Gary, Greensboro, Greenville, Kansas City, Oakland, Puebla, Querétaro, Saltillo, Toledo
Ameristar Air Cargo	Houston–Intercontinental
FedEx Express	Memphis, San Antonio
UPS Airlines	Louisville, San Antonio

== Accidents and incidents ==
- On 31 October 1983, Douglas DC-3C N44896 of FBN Flying Service was destroyed by fire at Laredo International Airport while attempting to take off on a cargo flight to McAllen-Miller International Airport. A fire had developed on board the aircraft during the take-off run, and the crew were unable to extinguish it with the equipment available to them.
- On 28 July 1987, Douglas C-53 N39DT of La Mesa Leasing Inc was damaged beyond economic repair when the port engine failed shortly after take-off on an international cargo flight to Ciudad Camargo Airport, Mexico. The aircraft was overloaded by 3,809 pounds (1,728 kg) and the power from the remaining good engine was insufficient to sustain flight. The aircraft stalled and crashed whilst attempting to make an emergency landing back at Laredo. Both crew survived. A post-accident investigation revealed no problems with the failed engine.
- On 18 January 1989, Douglas DC-3 XB-DYP crashed shortly after take-off. The aircraft was on an international cargo flight to Torreón International Airport, Mexico. The cause of the accident was that the cargo was improperly secured and shifted in flight, causing the centre of gravity to move aft.
- On 21 May 2002, Douglas DC-3A XB-JBR of Aero JBR ditched in Lake Casa Blanca, after a double engine failure while performing a touch-and-go at Laredo International Airport. It is reported that one of the engines suffered a propeller overspeed condition. All three crew escaped from the submerged aircraft.
- On 9 November 2010, ZA002, a flight test Boeing 787 made an emergency landing after fire had broken out in its P100 electrical panel.
- On June 16, 2026, a NetJets Cessna Citation Latitude, registration N523QS, crashed while attempting an emergency landing on Texas State Highway Loop 20, approximately 2-1/2 miles south of the airport. Of the six persons on board, one was fatally injured. The flight had originated at Mexico’s Los Cabos International Airport destined for Austin-Bergstrom International Airport, but diverted to Laredo after experiencing in-flight mechanical anomalies.

== See also ==
- List of airports in Texas
