= Piedras Negras International Airport =

International airport serving Piedras Negras, Coahuila, Mexico

Piedras Negras International Airport Aeropuerto Internacional de Piedras Negras
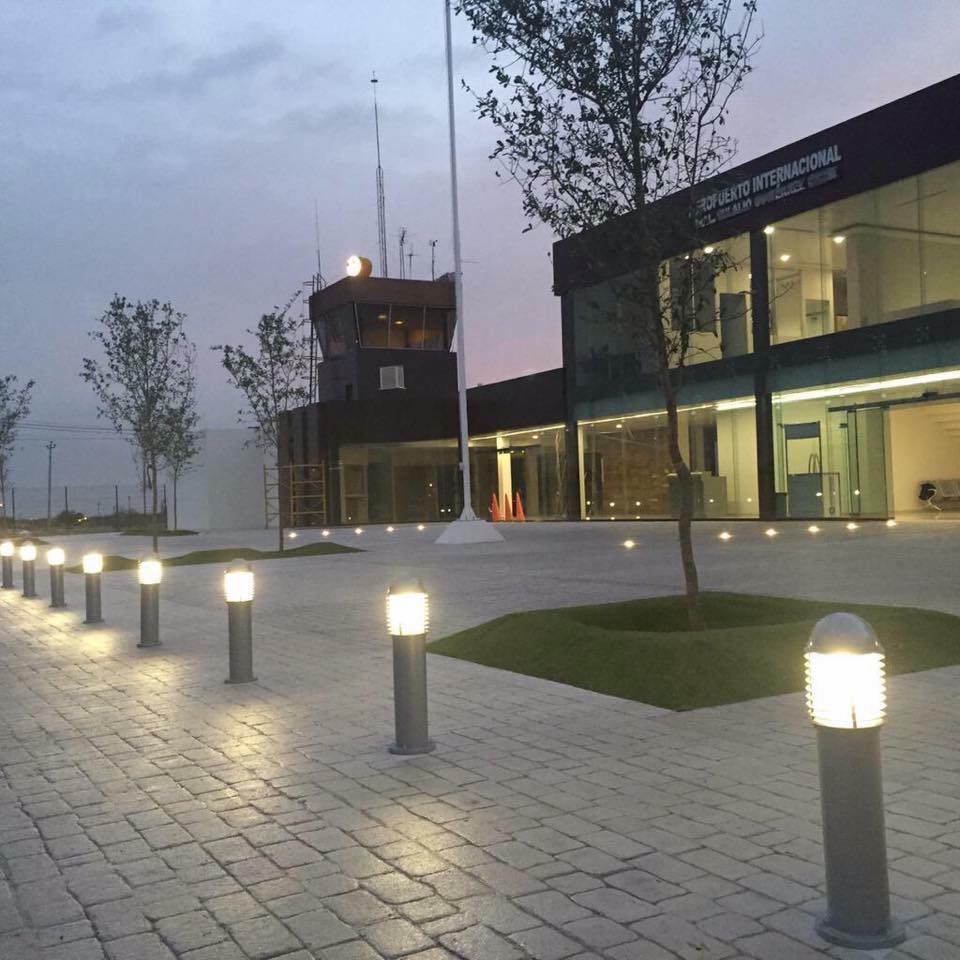
- IATA: PDS; ICAO: MMPG; LID: PNG

Summary
- Airport type: Public
- Operator: Administradora Coahuilense de Infraestructura y Transporte Aéreo
- Serves: Piedras Negras, Coahuila, Mexico
- Location: Nava, Coahuila, Mexico
- Time zone: CST (UTC-06:00)
  - Summer (DST): CDT (UTC-05:00)
- Elevation AMSL: 275 m (902 ft)
- Coordinates: 28°37′39″N 100°32′07″W

Map
- Location of airport in Coahuila PDS (Mexico)

Runways
Direction	Length		Surface
Direction	m	ft	Surface
12/30	2,028	6,654	Asphalt

Statistics (2025)
- Total passengers: 5,285
- Ranking in Mexico: 60th ▼5
- Source: Administradora Coahuilense de Infraestructura y Transporte Aéreo

Piedras Negras International Airport (Spanish: Aeropuerto Internacional de Piedras Negras) (IATA: PDS, ICAO: MMPG) is an international airport located in Piedras Negras, Coahuila, Mexico, near the Mexico–United States border. It serves domestic flights within Mexico for the Eagle Pass-Piedras Negras binational metropolitan area, the northern Coahuila region and Southern Texas. It also supports cargo operations, as well as executive and general aviation activities. Passengers traveling to destinations in the United States typically utilize the larger San Antonio International Airport. Piedras Negras Airport is operated by Administradora Coahuilense de Infraestructura y Transporte Aéreo, a state-owned operator. It handled 5,285 passengers in 2025.

== History ==
Over time, the airport has been served by multiple airlines. Aeroméxico Connect operated a daily flight to Monterrey until the winter of 2009, which was canceled due to the replacement of its Saab 340 aircraft with Embraer ERJ 145 jets. After two years without commercial flights, on November 3, 2010, Aeromar commenced operations in the city with the Piedras Negras-Monterrey route. Later, it was changed to the direct flight Piedras Negras-Saltillo-Mexico City. From 2014 until its bankruptcy in 2023, Aeromar offered flights between Piedras Negras and Mexico City. In 2023, the regional airline Aerus began operations with a route to Monterrey. Since 2013, the airport has been operated by the Administradora Coahuilense de Infraestructura y Transporte Aéreo, a company that manages various airports in the state of Coahuila.

== Facilities ==
The airport is situated at an elevation of 275 metres (902 ft) above mean sea level, featuring a single asphalt runway, designated as 05/23, measuring 2,030 by 30 metres (6,660 by 98 ft). The commercial aviation apron features three parking positions for narrow-body aircraft and additional stands for general aviation.

The passenger terminal caters to both domestic arrivals and departures in a two-story structure. It includes check-in areas, a security checkpoint, a baggage claim area, and an arrivals hall with car rental services, taxi stands, and several retail stores. The departures concourse includes two gates with direct access to the apron, allowing passengers to board their planes by walking to the aircraft. Adjacent facilities include parking areas, civil aviation hangars, administration offices, courier and logistic facilities, and facilities for general aviation. Nearby hotel options include Quality Inn, Holiday Inn Express, and Best Western.

== Airlines and destinations ==
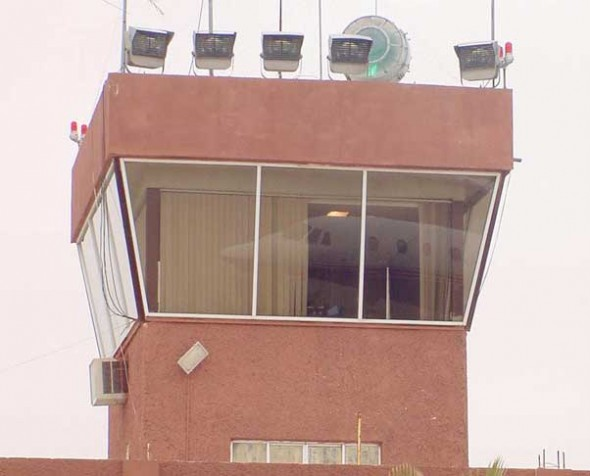
Control tower of the airport.

=== Passenger ===
Airlines	Destinations
Aerus	Monterrey

=== Destinations map ===
Destinations from Piedras Negras Airport
Red = Year-round destination
Blue = Future destination
Green = Seasonal destination

== Statistics ==
=== Annual Traffic ===
Passenger statistics at Piedras Negras Airport
Year	Air operations	Total Passengers	Cargo kg	Year	Air operations	Total Passengers	Cargo kg
2025	994	5,285	24,175	2015	692	17,810	19,390
2024	2,236	13,157	0	2014	644	15,034	30,598
2023	1,220	10,178	0	2013	1,252	11,449	48,129
2022	431	14,604	59,702	2012	804	7,694	81,460
2021	350	10,019	74,537	2011	735	8,419	3,100
2020	416	9,481	33,287	2010	82	779	32,292
2019	597	24,170	37,714	2009	0	0	0
2018	699	26,322	41,710	2008	1,061	10,516	1,068
2017	719	21,787	30,996	2007	1,171	11,888	535
2016	726	20,565	30,869	2006	1,137	13,355	4,117

== See also ==
- List of the busiest airports in Mexico
- List of airports in Mexico
- List of airports by ICAO code: M
- List of busiest airports in North America
- List of the busiest airports in Latin America
- Transportation in Mexico
- Tourism in Mexico
- Administradora Coahuilense de Infraestructura y Transporte Aéreo
- San Antonio International Airport
- Mexico–United States border
