= Brownsville/South Padre Island International Airport =

Airport in Brownsville, Texas, United States

Brownsville/South Padre Island International Airport (former Brownsville Army Airfield)

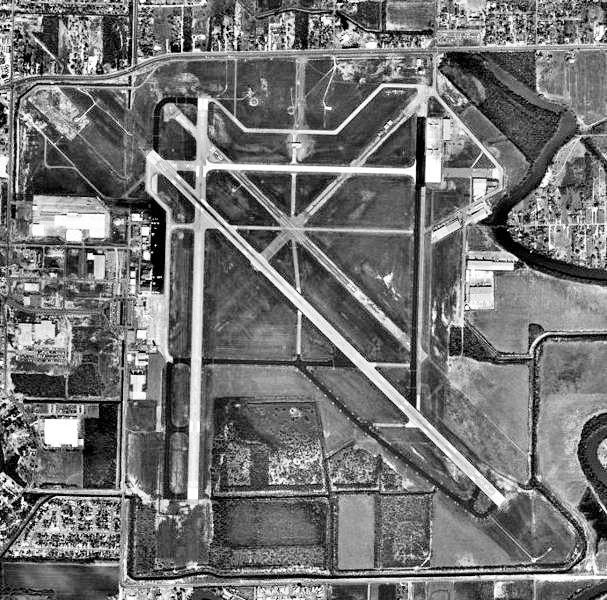
- USGS 2002 orthophoto
- IATA: BRO; ICAO: KBRO; FAA LID: BRO

Summary
- Airport type: Public
- Owner: City of Brownsville
- Serves: Brownsville / South Padre Island, Texas
- Location: Brownsville, Texas
- Elevation AMSL: 22 ft (6.7 m)
- Coordinates: 25°54′25″N 097°25′33″W
- Website: www.flybrownsville.com

Map
- Interactive map of Brownsville/South Padre Island International Airport

Runways
Direction	Length		Surface
Direction	ft	m	Surface
13/31	7,399	2,255	Asphalt
18/36	6,000	1,829	Asphalt

Statistics (2024)
- Total Passengers: 319,000
- Aircraft Operations: 25,603
- Source: Federal Aviation Administration

Brownsville/South Padre Island International Airport (IATA: BRO, ICAO: KBRO, FAA LID: BRO) is a regional airport located 5 mi (4.3 nmi; 8.0 km) east of downtown Brownsville, Cameron County, in the U.S. state of Texas.

The Brownsville/South Padre Island International Airport serves three airlines, six air taxis and offers two fixed-base operations (FBOs) for general aviation. The National Plan of Integrated Airport Systems for 2011–2015 categorized it as a primary commercial service facility.

The National Weather Service forecast office for deep south Texas is on the airport grounds. The airport has scheduled nonstop passenger flights to Dallas Fort Worth International Airport (DFW), George Bush Intercontinental Airport (IAH), and Monterrey International Airport (MTY).

== History ==
Brownsville was once the main terminal for air service between the United States and Mexico. In 1929, Pan American World Airways acquired a controlling stake in Mexicana de Aviación and began Ford Trimotor service between Brownsville and Mexico City, eventually extended to the Yucatan Peninsula to connect with Pan Am's Caribbean route network. On March 9, Charles Lindbergh inaugurated this service, landing at BRO after a five-hour, 38-minute flight from Mexico City. An event was held on site in Lindbergh's honor, with a crowd of over 20,000 greeting him upon his arrival. Among the attendees was Amelia Earhart, for whom the main street in front of the Airport is named. Brownsville became an early center for technical development in instrument navigation ("blind flying") due to the bad weather conditions that pilots encountered in the mountains over Mexico.

Pan Am's service terminated in Brownsville, and passengers were initially taken on the Missouri Pacific Railroad to St. Louis, Missouri for rail connections to the northern US. In 1931, American Airways was flying a multi-stop route Brownsville to Dallas, connecting to Chicago, Los Angeles and other cities. Braniff Airways began service in 1934, and Eastern Air Lines arrived in 1939.

During World War II the airport was redubbed Brownsville Army Air Field and used by the military for pilot training, engine testing and overhauls.

In 1947, Pan Am's Mexico City route extended to Houston, and Brownsville was an intermediate stop. Pan Am service to Brownsville ended in 1962 as the Mexico City flight became a nonstop service from Houston Hobby Airport eventually flown with a Boeing 707. In the 1960s, the 16th weather radar system in the country was installed at BRO.

In 1979, the year after airline deregulation, Brownsville was served by three airlines: Braniff International Airways (727s to Dallas/Fort Worth), Texas International Airlines (DC-9s to Houston and McAllen), and Tejas Airlines (commuter turboprops to Corpus Christi, McAllen and San Antonio).

In 1982, a new ATC tower was built.

In 1983, the airport was renamed the Brownsville-South Padre Island International Airport.

In 2014, expansion of the runway to 10,000 or 12,000 feet (3,000 or 3,700 m) was proposed by the Brownsville City Aviation Director, and the city purchased 8.2 acres (3.3 ha) of land for about $200,000.

A new modern and more spacious terminal was built in 2019-2020, replacing the old, crowded terminal.

In 2021, in part as a response to expanding operations by SpaceX in relation to its South Texas launch site, a new 91,000 square foot terminal was opened to accommodate an increase in tourism and migration. A further $1.6 million was awarded to the city of Brownsville by the Federal Aviation Administration to enhance the airport's jet bridges. Since March 2022, one of Starship SN8's flaps has been on public display at Brownsville/South Padre Island International Airport.

A new long term parking lot was completed in 2024.

== Brownsville Army Airfield ==
During World War II, the airport was used by the United States Army Air Forces, although the Air Corps had signed a contract with Pan American Airways in 1940 for the training of aircraft mechanics at the airport. Shortly after the Pearl Harbor Attack on December 7, 1941, both Army and Navy observation aircraft began operations from the airport flying antisubmarine missions over the Gulf of Mexico.

For the first year of the United States' involvement in combat of the war, Pan American continued to operate the airport, providing training to Ferrying Command pilots and ground mechanics assigned to the 18th Transport Transition Training Detachment. With the realignment of Ferrying Command to Air Transport Command on July 1, 1942, plans were made by the Army to assume jurisdiction of the airport. On July 28, 1943, the USAAF 568th AAF Base Unit, Air Transport Command was assigned to the newly designated Brownsville Army Airfield. The mission of the 4th Fighter Operational Training Unit at the airfield was the training of pilots to ferry pursuit planes to the various theaters of war. Training was carried out by AAF instructor pilots, however Pan American Airways retained operations at the airfield flying larger 2 and 4 engine transports to the airport as an overhaul facility. In May 1944, a new mission was developed to train multi-engined pilots at the base. The school began operations in June, and the pilots began to ferry large numbers of aircraft to Panama for subsequent shipment by sealift to Australia.

Achievements of note during World War II at Brownsville AAF were:

- Civilian Pilot Training program initiated to train military and commercial pilots.
- The first American jet engine flight was tested at Brownsville Army Air Field.
- B-29 bombers were renovated on the site.
- The airport had one of the largest overhaul facilities in the country. By the end of the war Pan American had overhauled nearly 6,000 engines.

With the end of the Pacific War in August 1945, operations at Brownsville AAF were dramatically reduced. Flight operations continued at a reduced level for the balance of 1945, however in early January the base was declared surplus and was inactivated on March 5, 1946, and returned to full civilian control.

== Facilities ==
The Brownsville/South Padre Island International Airport covers 1,700 acres (690 ha) at an elevation of 22 feet (6.7 m). It has two asphalt runways: 13/31 is 7,399 by 150 feet (2,255 by 46 m); 17/35 is 6,000 by 150 feet (1,829 by 46 m)

In 2011, the airport had 37,412 aircraft operations, an average of 102 per day: 45% general aviation, 40% military, 14% air taxi, and 1% airline. Fifty-five aircraft were then based at the airport: 87% single-engine and 13% multi-engine.

Several regional jets, including the Embraer E-Jet family that are respectively operated by American Eagle (Envoy Air) and United Express for their partners American Airlines and United Airlines to Brownsville. Previous airliners at the airport include ERJ 135s, ERJ 140s and ATR-42s (flown by Chautauqua Airlines, Envoy Airlines, ExpressJet Airlines) and Boeing 737-200s, 737-300s and 737-500s (on Continental Airlines).

Pan American Airways, Inc. (no relation to the original Pan Am) was in the 1931 Pan American Airways Building at the Brownsville South Padre Island International Airport. The company renovated the 1931 Pan American Airways Building with the intent of re-opening the "Gateway to Latin America" in 2011. That re-opening never happened and the company no longer exists.

== Airlines and destinations ==
An ExpressJet Airlines ERJ 145 arriving at the Gate 2 jetway

=== Passenger ===
American Eagle operates Bombardier CRJ-900 and Embraer E-Jet family regional jets on their route to Dallas/Fort Worth (DFW), with United Express operating Embraer ERJ-175 and Embraer ERJ-145 regional jets on their route to Houston (IAH). American Eagle and United Express services are operated via code share agreements with SkyWest Airlines, Mesa Airlines, Envoy Air, and CommuteAir. Aerus, uses the Cessna Grand Caravan with daily service to Monterrey.

Airlines	Destinations
Aerus	Monterrey
American Eagle	Dallas/Fort Worth
Breeze Airways	Orlando
United Express	Houston–Intercontinental

Destinations map
Destinations from Brownsville
Red = Year-round destination
Green = Seasonal destination
Blue = Future destination

=== Cargo ===
The Brownsville/South Padre Island International Airport handles the least cargo in the RGV, behind Valley International Airport and the McAllen Miller International Airport. There are no current cargo carriers serving BRO, but in summer 2024, cargo activity was boosted after carriers like IFL Group and USA Jet Airlines occasionally flew into BRO.

Pan American Airways and World-Wide Consolidated Logistics, Inc. were to open cargo service to Latin America in 2011. A TSA Certified Cargo Screening Facility was established by World-Wide Consolidated Logistics, Inc. to facility the screening of domestic and international cargo to and from the United States with the intent of Brownsville South Padre Island International Airport being the "Gateway to Latin America" in 2011 and the "Gateway to Africa" (via the Southern Route) in 2012. Those plans never came to fruition because the entity's (PAAWWCL) owner ran into legal trouble, preventing the airline from initiating any new services.

== Historical airline service ==
Pan American World Airways (Pan Am) began serving Brownsville in 1929, flying to Mexico City via Tampico. In 1950, Pan Am Douglas DC-4s flew Brownsville to Mexico City via Tampico; in 1953-54 Pan Am's route was extended north to Houston. In 1960, Pan Am ended the Tampico stop, flying BRO-MEX nonstop; in 1962 the HOU-MEX flight became a DC-8 and Pan Am dropped Brownsville, whose longest runway was 5734 ft until 1965.

In 1931, American Airways flew Brownsville-San Antonio-Austin-Waco-Fort Worth-Dallas; in 1934 American Airways became American Airlines and quit flying to south Texas.

Braniff International Airways and Eastern Air Lines served Brownsville for many years. In 1935, Braniff flew Lockheed Model 10 Electras Brownsville-Corpus Christi-San Antonio-Austin-Waco-Fort Worth-Dallas. In 1940, a Braniff Douglas DC-3 flew Brownsville-Corpus Christi-San Antonio-Austin-Fort Worth-Dallas-Oklahoma City-Ponca City-Wichita-Kansas City-Chicago. The Eastern timetable for March 1, 1939, said: "A New Route to Brownsville and Mexico". In 1941, Eastern's "Mexico Silver Sleeper" flew New York City-Washington, D.C.-Atlanta-New Orleans-Houston Hobby Airport-Corpus Christi-Brownsville. Eastern listed connections at Brownsville to Pan Am's service to Mexico. In 1958, Eastern Convair 340s flew Brownsville-Corpus Christi-Houston Hobby-Beaumont/Port Arthur-Lake Charles-Lafayette-Baton Rouge-New Orleans-Mobile-Pensacola-Montgomery-Birmingham-Atlanta. In 1965, Eastern's Convair 440s flew Brownsville-Corpus Christi-Houston-Beaumont-Lake Charles-Lafayette-Baton Rouge-New Orleans. Trans-Texas Airways (TTa) also served Brownsville; in 1952 TTa Douglas DC-3s flew Brownsville-Harlingen-McAllen-Alice-Corpus Christi-Beeville-Victoria-Houston. Years later TTa would be renamed Texas International Airlines.

First jets scheduled to Brownsville were Braniff International BAC One-Elevens in May 1965, soon followed by Eastern 727s. The airport then had two airline departures a day, both to Corpus Christi.

In 1966, Braniff's One-Eleven flew Brownsville-Corpus Christi-San Antonio-Austin-Dallas Love Field-Tulsa-Kansas City. In summer 1967, it flew Brownsville-Corpus Christi-Houston Hobby Airport-Dallas Love Field-Wichita-Kansas City-Chicago. In 1974, Braniff was flying Boeing 727-100s and Boeing 727-200s nonstop to Dallas/Ft. Worth (DFW) and Houston Intercontinental Airport and direct to Washington, D.C., Detroit, Amarillo and Lubbock. In fall 1979, Braniff was operating three daily nonstop Boeing 727s to Dallas/Ft. Worth and one-stop to New York City via John F. Kennedy International Airport and one-stop to Chicago O'Hare Airport and Minneapolis/St. Paul. In spring 1981, Braniff had nonstop Boeing 727s to Dallas/Ft. Worth.

In fall 1979, three Texas International Airlines Douglas DC-9-10s a day flew nonstop to Houston Intercontinental Airport. In summer 1982, Texas International, which had been acquired by Continental Airlines, was flying two DC-9-10s a day nonstop to Houston; one continued to Dallas/Ft. Worth, Albuquerque and Los Angeles (LAX). By 1983, Continental had begun operating nonstop service to IAH with Boeing 727-100s and McDonnell Douglas DC-9-30s. Ozark Air Lines served Brownsville in the early and mid 1980s with McDonnell Douglas DC-9-30s nonstop to Dallas/Ft. Worth and San Antonio, continuing to the airline's St. Louis hub. In fall 1984, Royale Airlines was flying three Douglas DC-9-10s a day nonstop to Houston Intercontinental Airport via a passenger feed agreement with Continental Airlines. In summer 1985, Muse Air was flying five nonstops a day to Houston Hobby Airport (HOU), and direct to Dallas Love Field (DAL) and Tulsa with McDonnell Douglas DC-9-50s and McDonnell Douglas MD-80s. Muse Air's successor, TranStar Airlines continued McDonnell Douglas DC-9-50s to Houston Hobby Airport in 1986 and 1987 with some continuing to Dallas Love Field or New Orleans.

In fall 1994, Continental Airlines and affiliate Continental Express had five nonstops a day to Houston Intercontinental Airport, four on Continental Boeing 727-200s, Boeing 737-500s or McDonnell Douglas MD-80s and one on a Continental Express ATR-42. Continental also had a nonstop McDonnell Douglas MD-80 to Mexico City and two Boeing 727-200s a day Detroit-Houston-Brownsville and back. In spring 1995, Continental Airlines and Continental Express together had five nonstops a day to Houston Intercontinental Airport. Continental flew Boeing 737-300 and Boeing 737-500s to the airport while Continental Express flew ATR-42s and ATR-72s. Continental merged with United Airlines in 2010.

Allegiant Air scheduled nonstop flights to Las Vegas from beginning June 2015 but ended flights from Brownsville and now services MFE.

Avelo Airlines started service to Brownsville on May 17, 2023 with non-stop flights to Burbank and Orlando. In September 2023, they expanded their service with flights to Las Vegas, but that service was terminated after only a couple months. The Burbank and Orlando routes stayed for eight more months before departing BRO in August 2024. All three routes were flown on Wednesday and Saturday seasonally.

== See also ==
- List of airports in Texas
- Texas World War II Army Airfields
