= Monclova International Airport =

Airport serving Monclova, Coahuila, Mexico

Monclova International Airport Aeropuerto Internacional de Monclova
- IATA: LOV; ICAO: MMMV; LID: MOV

Summary
- Airport type: Public
- Operator: Administradora Coahuilense de Infraestructura y Transporte Aéreo
- Serves: Monclova, Coahuila, Mexico
- Location: Frontera, Coahuila, Mexico
- Time zone: CST (UTC-06:00)
- Elevation AMSL: 568 m / 1,864 ft
- Coordinates: 26°57′21″N 101°28′12″W

Map
- Location of airport in Coahuila LOV (Mexico)

Runways
Direction	Length		Surface
Direction	m	ft	Surface
06R/24L	2,100	6,890	Asphalt
06L/24R	1,458	4,783	Asphalt

Statistics (2025)
- Total passengers: N/A
- Source: Agencia Federal de Aviación Civil

Monclova International Airport (Spanish: Aeropuerto Internacional de Monclova); officially Aeropuerto Internacional Venustiano Carranza (Venustiano Carranza International Airport) (IATA: LOV, ICAO: MMMV) is an international airport situated in Frontera, Coahuila, Mexico. It manages the air traffic for the city of Monclova, supporting domestic flights, air taxi services, flight training, and general aviation activities. Operated by Administradora Coahuilense de Infraestructura y Transporte Aéreo, the airport is named in honor of the Mexican President Venustiano Carranza.

Over time, the airport has had service from commercial airlines, offering domestic and international flights. Until 2008, Continental Express operated a flight to Houston. In 2004 and from 2017 to 2018, Aeromar provided a flight to Mexico City. The airport handled 2,175 passengers in 2018 and 19 in 2019.

== Facilities ==
Monclova Airport is located at an elevation of 568 metres (1,864 ft) above mean sea level, featuring two asphalt runways. The first, designated as 06R/24L, measures 2,100 by 45 metres (6,890 by 148 ft), and the second (06L/24R) is smaller, measuring 1,458 by 17 metres (4,783 by 56 ft). The commercial aviation apron provides parking positions for one commercial aircraft, while a second apron offers parking for general aviation. Adjacent facilities include civil aviation hangars, an apron with parking positions for aircraft, and a terminal building with departure and arrival facilities for both domestic and international flights.

== See also ==
- List of airports in Mexico
- List of the busiest airports in Mexico
- List of busiest airports in North America
- List of the busiest airports in Latin America
- List of airports by ICAO code: M
- Airline destinations
- Transportation in Mexico
- Tourism in Mexico
- Monterrey International Airport
