= Ciudad Acuña International Airport =

Airport in Ciudad Acuña, Coahuila, Mexico

Ciudad Acuña International Airport Aeropuerto Internacional de Ciudad Acuña
- IATA: ACN; ICAO: MMCC; LID: CAC

Summary
- Airport type: Public
- Operator: Administradora Coahuilense de Infraestructura y Transporte Aéreo
- Serves: Ciudad Acuña, Coahuila, Mexico
- Time zone: Zona Centro (UTC–06:00)
  - Summer (DST): DST (UTC–05:00)
- Elevation AMSL: 430 m (1,410 ft)
- Coordinates: 29°20′02″N 101°06′03″W

Map
- Location of the airport in Coahuila ACN (Mexico)

Runways
Direction	Length		Surface
Direction	m	ft	Surface
13/31	1,801	5,909	Asphalt

Statistics (2021)
- Total passengers: N/A
- Source: Administradora Coahuilense de Infraestructura y Transporte Aéreo

Ciudad Acuña International Airport (Spanish: Aeropuerto Internacional de Ciudad Acuña) (IATA: ACN, ICAO: MMCC) is an international airport located in Ciudad Acuña, Coahuila, Mexico, near the U.S.-Mexico border. It handles national and international air traffic for the city of Ciudad Acuña, serving flight training and general aviation activities. It is operated by Administradora Coahuilense de Infraestructura y Transporte Aéreo.

The airport does not provide scheduled passenger public flights. The nearest airports serving commercial flights are San Antonio International Airport, in Texas, and Piedras Negras International Airport, in Coahuila.

The airport is situated at an elevation of 430 metres (1,410 ft) above mean sea level, located 13 kilometres (8.1 mi) west of Ciudad Acuña. It features a single asphalt runway, designated as 13/31, measuring 1,800 by 30 metres (5,906 by 98 ft). Adjacent facilities include a small passenger terminal and an apron with parking positions for small aircraft.

== See also ==
- List of the busiest airports in Mexico
- List of airports in Mexico
- List of airports by ICAO code: M
- List of busiest airports in North America
- List of the busiest airports in Latin America
- Transportation in Mexico
- Tourism in Mexico
- Piedras Negras International Airport
- San Antonio International Airport
- Administradora Coahuilense de Infraestructura y Transporte Aéreo
