= McAllen Miller International Airport =

Airport in McAllen, Texas, United States

McAllen International Airport

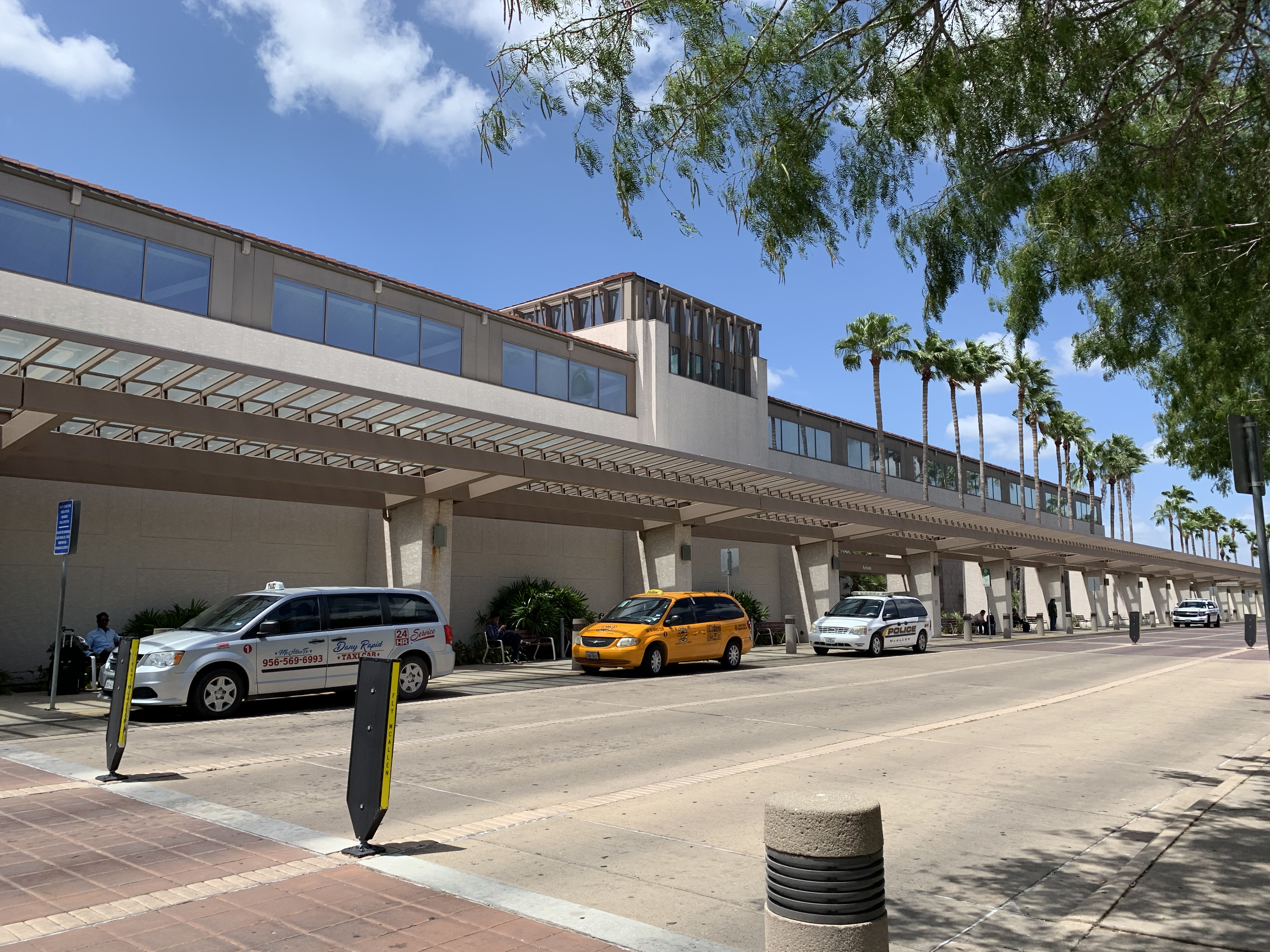
- IATA: MFE; ICAO: KMFE; FAA LID: MFE

Summary
- Airport type: Public
- Owner: City of McAllen
- Serves: McAllen, Texas
- Elevation AMSL: 107 ft (33 m)
- Coordinates: 26°10′33″N 098°14′19″W
- Website: www.McAllenAirport.com

Map
- Interactive map of McAllen International Airport

Runways
Direction	Length		Surface
Direction	ft	m	Surface
14/32	7,120	2,170	Asphalt
18/36	2,639	804	Asphalt

Statistics (2025)
- Passenger volume: 1,142,842
- Total enplanements: 576,034
- Source: Federal Aviation Administration

McAllen International Airport (IATA: MFE, ICAO: KMFE, FAA LID: MFE) is an international airport serving McAllen, Mission and the surrounding Rio Grande Valley region of Texas in the United States. It is located in the city of McAllen in Hidalgo County.

The National Plan of Integrated Airport Systems for 2025–2029 categorized it as a small hub primary commercial service airport. In 2023, MFE ranked as the 133rd busiest airport in the United States, with 513,770 enplanements. Passenger enplanements at the airport grew 13.43% between 2022 and 2023. MFE is the busiest airport in the Rio Grande Valley, followed by Valley International Airport in Harlingen, then by Brownsville/South Padre Island International Airport in Brownsville.

== Runways ==
McAllen International Airport covers 370 acres (150 ha) at an elevation of 107 feet (33 m). It has two asphalt runways: 14/32 is 7,120 by 150 feet (2,170 x 46 m) and 18/36 is 2,639 by 60 feet (804 x 18 m). In November 2015, runway 13/31 was redesignated 14/32 and an EMAS, engineered materials arrestor system, was installed at the runway 14 approach end.

In the updated 20-year Master Plan for MFE, runway 14/32 will be extended to 10,000 ft and a parallel runway will be added. An expanded cargo apron will be on the south side of the airport.

Runway 14/32 is the primary runway, used by all the airlines and most of the business flights. 3,000 feet will likely be added to Runway 14/32 to allow larger aircraft (Moultan, 2012). Runway 18/36 does not intersect Runway 14/32 so controllers can use both runways if needed. The departure end of Runway 18 is about 1/3 of the way down Runway 14/32, so traffic on final for Runway 36 must be cautious of traffic using Runway 14/32. Class D airports are airports that are less congested but they still have a control tower. This Class D airport has a simple layout and taxiways extend the full length of each runway. Both runways are asphalt and are in good condition. The terminal is easy for all traffic to reach from either runway, but aircraft on runway 14/32 have to cross runway 18/36 to reach the fixed-base operator (FBO). The runways form a V. The terminal, tower, cargo facility, border patrol, and the U.S. Customs apron are all centrally located on the field, easy to access from either runway. On the west side of Runway 18/36, there are multiple hangars, the fixed-base operator, and the fire station. In case of an accident on Runway 14/32, fire and rescue personnel would have to cross Runway 18/36, one possible issue of the layout at MFE.

== Facilities ==
The airport has one terminal with six gates. In early 2006, Gate 5 opened on the main concourse due to the arrival of Delta Connection.

In 2008, a terminal capacity study assessed the future needs of the airport and possible terminal expansion to include eight gates, a larger ticketing/office area, and a TSA security area queue. Paid parking at the airport began on November 15, 2007, with the economy, long-term and short-term lots. A revised terminal expansion project with one additional gate, larger passenger waiting areas, expansion of the TSA screening areas, and other facility modifications began in March 2012.

In the year ending October 31, 2018, the airport had 56,613 aircraft operations, an average of 155 per day: 62% general aviation, 17% military, 15% commercial airline and 6% air taxi. In December 2019, 105 aircraft were based at this airport: 49 single-engine, 21 multi-engine, 17 jet, 11 helicopter and 7 military.

== Expansion ==
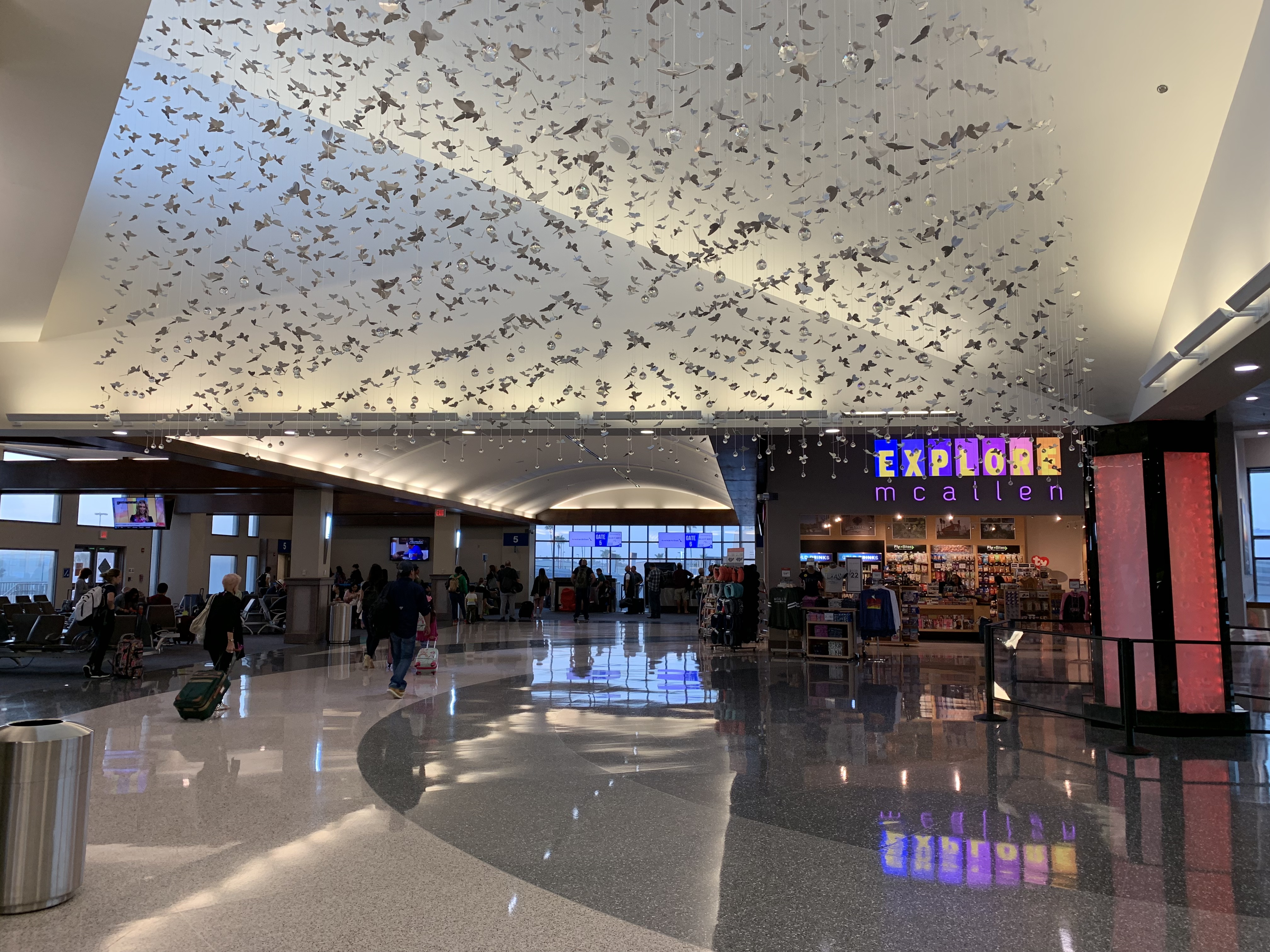
Waiting area at the main terminal

In March 2012, the airport underwent expansion, completed in 2014. Funding was from grants combined from the FAA and the TSA.

The following are planned:

- Addition of 52,000 square feet
- Adding space for new explosives screening unit, bringing the total to three
- Expanding the terminal and adding space for another gate
- Adding space for the Transportation Security Administration
- Sterilizer and steam generator (required for some international flights)
- Replacement of HVAC central plant equipment

The project includes construction of a one-story building addition of about 7,400 square feet at the west end of the terminal building for a checked baggage screening facility and expanded outbound baggage handling system; renovation of about 11,200 square feet at the east end of the terminal building for public lobby improvements, expanded passenger security screening checkpoint, tenant office improvements, and concessions. It includes a two-story addition of about 33,000 square feet at the south end of the terminal building for aircraft boarding gates with passenger boarding bridges, passenger holdrooms, public lobbies, restrooms, concessions, airline operations, and mechanical and electrical equipment rooms; renovation of about 5,000 square feet at the south end of the terminal building for aircraft boarding gate and passenger holdroom improvements. It includes the replacement of HVAC central plant equipment and refurbishment of five existing passenger boarding bridges. Work includes replacement of portions of the aircraft apron as required for building construction, underground utilities work, and apron drainage, and pavement marking and striping for aircraft positions and service vehicle lanes.

Starting in 2027, the airport will undergo an additional expansion of roughly 70,000 square feet adding 4 more gates for a total of 10. A multi story parking garage will be in the works as well with an additional luggage carousel and baggage claim technology adding a total of 3.

== Ground transportation ==
Metro McAllen route 4 picks up at Bicentennial and Wichita at the front of the airport, towards stops in downtown McAllen, including McAllen Central Station.

== Airlines and destinations ==
Destinations

The following airlines operate scheduled passenger service from the airport:

Airlines	Destinations
Aerus	Monterrey
Allegiant Air	Las Vegas; Seasonal: Orlando-Sanford
American Airlines	Dallas/Fort Worth
American Eagle	Dallas/Fort Worth, Phoenix–Sky Harbor
Delta Connection	Austin
United Express	Houston–Intercontinental
United Airlines	Houston–Intercontinental

Destinations map
Destinations from McAllen Miller International Airport
Red = Year-round destination
Green = Seasonal destination
Blue = Future destination

== Current and recent air service ==
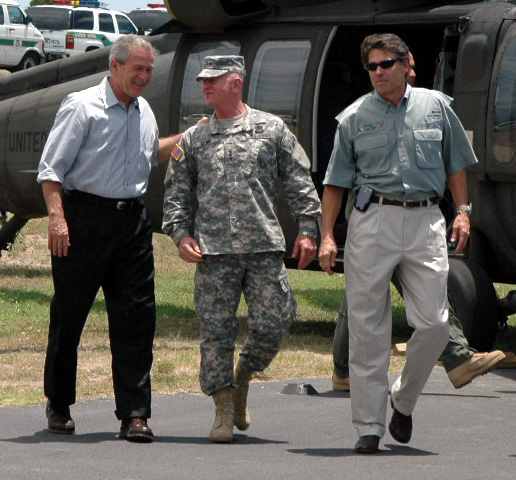
President George W. Bush is greeted at MFE by U.S. Army Lt. Gen. H Steven Blum and Texas Governor Rick Perry on August 3, 2006. Bush was visiting troops participating in Operation Jump Start.

MFE is the busiest airline airport in the Rio Grande Valley. The airport is also served by all three global alliances, SkyTeam, Star Alliance, and Oneworld. MFE lost its only international flight in September 2007 – a daily Continental Express flight to Mexico City. Mexican air carrier Aeromar operated nonstop service from the airport to the capital of Mexico. After less than one year, it was announced that MFE would lose its only non-stop flight to Los Angeles (LAX), operated by Delta Connection partner ExpressJet Airlines, at the end of 2007; however, Allegiant Air currently flies a seasonal nonstop McAllen to LAX with several flights a week. In December 2007, it was announced that Delta Connection would pull out of McAllen on January 6, 2008, ending its two flights a day from MFE to Atlanta, operated by Delta Connection partner Atlantic Southeast Airlines. In March 2009, Delta, through its wholly owned subsidiary Northwest Airlines, began flying MFE to Memphis on Northwest Airlink partner Pinnacle Airlines. Northwest Airlines had previously flown MFE to its Memphis hub starting in 2004. Following the completion of the merger of Northwest into Delta in 2010, the Memphis hub was eventually shut down although Delta continues to serve MEM.

On September 7, 2010, Delta Connection partner Atlantic Southeast Airlines (ASA) resumed service to MFE essentially taking over the non-stop MFE–MEM route from Pinnacle Airlines. On May 1, 2011, Delta Connection partner ASA began non-stop service from MFE to ATL and ended service from MFE to MEM (flights from MFE to ATL were then operated by ExpressJet following the merger of this regional airline with Atlantic Southeast). This route was discontinued on May 1, 2012.

On May 24, 2009, Allegiant Air began bi-weekly, non-stop service to Los Angeles International Airport (LAX), in addition to non-stop service to Orlando Sanford International Airport (SFB) twice a week, and non-stop service to Las Vegas McCarran International Airport (LAS) five times a week. On August 15, 2009, Allegiant announced that it would end service from MFE to LAX; Allegiant later reinstated service and flies non-stop to LAX seasonally from early June to late August, but as of mid September 2025, Allegiant removed LAX from their network, which includes a cut of the LAX-MFE route. This eliminates the only West Coast flight from the Valley. Allegiant still operates seasonal flights to Orlando, and year-round flights to Las Vegas.

== Past service ==
Trans-Texas Airways (TTa) and successor Texas International Airlines (TI) served the airport for over 32 years and was the only air carrier to do so for many years. In 1949, Trans-Texas 21-seat Douglas DC-3s flew Brownsville - Harlingen - McAllen - Laredo - Carrizo Springs/Crystal City - Eagle Pass - Uvalde - San Antonio - Beeville - Victoria - Houston and back; TTa also flew direct to El Paso. In 1963, Trans-Texas flights to McAllen were all Convair 240s flying direct to Austin, Corpus Christi, Dallas Love Field, Fort Worth (via now closed Greater Southwest International Airport), Houston, Laredo, Longview, TX, San Antonio, Shreveport, Tyler, TX and Victoria; In 1968 Convair 600s were on all TTa flights from the airport. Jets arrived in 1969; in 1970 Texas International Douglas DC-9-10s flew non-stop to Houston Intercontinental Airport and Corpus Christi and direct to Dallas Love Field. In July 1970 TI was flying McAllen - Harlingen - Houston Intercontinental Airport - Dallas Love Field - Midland/Odessa - Roswell, NM - Albuquerque - Los Angeles, and Convair 600s flew non-stop to Houston and direct to Austin and San Antonio. In 1978, Texas International was all-jet with Douglas DC-9-10s and McDonnell Douglas DC-9-30s nonstop to Dallas/Fort Worth (DFW), Houston (IAH) and San Antonio and direct to Albuquerque, Austin, Denver, Lafayette, LA, Lubbock and New Orleans. In 1980, TI flew nonstop DC-9s to Dallas/Fort Worth International Airport, Dallas Love Field, and Houston Intercontinental Airport.

== International air service ==
On January 11, 2012, Mexican air carrier Aeromar announced it would commence non-stop service to Mexico City beginning in mid-March. Aeromar was the only airline offering international non-stop service from the airport, flying ATR 42 or ATR 72 turboprops on its Mexico City route. On March 18, 2021, Aeromar announced twice a week, non-stop service to Monterrey initiating April 22, 2021. On February 15, 2023, Aeromar ceased all operations.

Trans-Texas Airways (TTa) began flights to Mexico from the airport in 1967; in 1968, TTa had ten non-stop Convair 600s a week to Monterrey and direct six days a week to Tampico and Veracruz via Harlingen. In 1969, Trans-Texas changed its name to Texas International Airlines and, in 1970, was flying daily Douglas DC-9-10s nonstop to Monterrey with a routing of Dallas Love Field (DAL) - Houston Intercontinental Airport (IAH) - Harlingen - McAllen - Monterrey. In 1974, Texas International DC-9s were flying nonstop to Mexico City via a routing of Dallas/Fort Worth - Houston Intercontinental - Corpus Christi - McAllen - Mexico City but no longer flew non-stop to Monterrey. In 1975, Texas International was flying non-stop DC-9s from the airport to both Tampico and Veracruz twice a week with these flights continuing on to Mexico City and then non-stop from Mexico City back to McAllen. By the late 1970s, Texas International was no longer flying from the airport to Mexico although the airline was continuing to fly DC-9s non-stop to both Houston and Dallas/Fort Worth.

In 1982 Texas International merged into Continental Airlines and service to Mexico resumed. Texas International initially operated as an independent air carrier; the June 1, 1982 Continental (CO) / Texas International (TI) joint timetable lists non-stop DC-9s twice a day from the airport to Mexico City and non-stop DC-9s four times a week to Guadalajara. By the end of 1983 Continental had pulled out of the airport. Continental returned to McAllen in the mid-1980s with nonstop DC-9s to Houston Intercontinental, and nonstop MD-80s to Mexico City by the mid 1990s. In the mid-2000s Continental had turned over its Mexico City flight to regional codesharing partner Continental Express operated by ExpressJet, flying a daily Embraer ERJ-145 to MEX. This service ended later.

McAllen was served by Aeromexico partner Aerolitoral via a codesharing agreement during the mid-1990s. In 1994 Aerolitoral was flying up to four non-stops a day to Monterrey with Fairchild Swearingen Metroliners continuing direct to Chihuahua, Leon, San Luis Potosi, Tampico or Villahermosa.

International airport service was reinstated when Mexican airline Aeromexico announced service between McAllen and Mexico City (Felipe Ángeles International Airport) in early 2024. Volaris also started flights between McAllen and Cancun in mid 2024. This flight is heavily subsidized by the McAllen airport, reaching as low as 15% load factors during fall and winter months. However, in late 2025, Sean Duffy, the US Secretary of Transportation, issued an order cancelling all service between the United States and the Felipe Ángeles Airport in response to what he perceived as the Mexican government's "blatant disregard of the 2015 U.S.-Mexico Air Transport Agreement and its ongoing anti-competitive behavior."

== Past jet service ==
After merging with Texas International Airlines in 1982, Continental Airlines began serving McAllen, mainly non-stop to its hub at Houston Intercontinental Airport. Continental flew Boeing 727-100s, 727-200s, 737-300s, 737-500s, 737-800s, 757-200s, Douglas DC-9-10s, McDonnell Douglas DC-9-30s and MD-80s to McAllen. Continental also flew one-stop direct service to Atlanta, Chicago (ORD), Dallas/Fort Worth (DFW), Kansas City, Miami, New Orleans, Pensacola, Seattle and Tampa. In 1994, the airline was flying MD-80s direct to Anchorage, Alaska via Houston and Seattle. Continental merged with United Airlines in 2010.

In 1982, Austin-based Emerald Air (United States) operated Pan Am Express service in Texas via an agreement with Pan Am and flew two Douglas DC-9-10 flights a day to Houston Intercontinental Airport and San Antonio. By 1984, Emerald Air was serving McAllen independently with up to eleven departures a day, all DC-9s. Emerald was flying non-stop to Dallas/Fort Worth, Houston Intercontinental, San Antonio and Corpus Christi, and one-stop to Austin. This airline went out of business in 1985.

Muse Air and successor TranStar Airlines served McAllen in the mid 1980s. In 1985, Houston-based Muse Air was operating up to five departures a day non-stop to its hub at Houston Hobby Airport with McDonnell Douglas DC-9-50s, all continuing direct to Dallas Love Field. Muse Air was acquired by Southwest Airlines which changed the Muse Air name to TranStar, and continued independently with nonstop DC-9-50s to Houston Hobby and one-stop to Dallas Love Field. TranStar went out of business in 1987.

American Airlines began serving the airport about January 1991. In 1991, American had three daily McDonnell Douglas MD-80s to its Dallas/Fort Worth (DFW) hub and, by 1995, was flying four daily Fokker 100s to DFW. In 2007, American had up to four nonstop MD80s a day to Dallas/Fort Worth. AA had one-stop MD-80s to Atlanta, El Paso, Oakland, and Raleigh/Durham. American and regional affiliate American Eagle continue to serve the airport.

Trans World Airlines (TWA) also served McAllen. In 2001, TWA McDonnell Douglas MD-80s flew nonstop to Austin and one-stop to its St. Louis hub. By the end of 2001, Trans World Airlines had merged into American Airlines.

Delta Connection operated by Atlantic Southeast Airlines flew to Delta's Atlanta hub. In 2007, Delta Connection had two nonstops a day to ATL with Canadair CRJ-200s for Delta Air Lines in a codesharing agreement. This service ended in 2012. Prior to the merger of Northwest Airlines with Delta in 2010, Northwest DC-9s flew nonstop to its Memphis hub in 2004, followed by Northwest Airlink nonstops to MEM on codesharing partner Pinnacle Airlines Canadair CRJ-200s in 2009.

== Past commuter airlines ==
In the late 1970s, Tejas Airlines flew Fairchild Swearingen Metroliners nonstop to San Antonio.

McAllen was served by Austin-based Conquest Airlines from the late 1980s to the mid 1990s; in 1989, it flew Beechcraft 1900Cs nonstop to San Antonio. By 1994, Conquest was flying nonstop to Austin, Laredo and San Antonio and one-stop to Tyler, TX, all on Metroliners.

== Amenities ==
The McAllen Miller International Airport's food and beverage options include a Coffee Zone both pre- and post-security and the Comfort Zone bar post-security. In addition, the McAllen Airport offers complimentary Wi-Fi throughout the terminal. Post-security, the airport has a Classic Shoe Shine booth whose prices can be found on the airport's website. For shopping amenities, the airport has the Explore McAllen store post-security. In October 2010, a CNBC News Store was completed pre-security.

The airport has on-site and off-site rental car companies as well.

== Cargo ==
Airlines	Destinations
UPS Airlines	Little Rock, Louisville

== Area airports ==
Nearby airports with passenger air service in south Texas include:

- Valley International Airport (HRL) – Harlingen (40 miles (64 km))
- Brownsville/South Padre Island International Airport (BRO) – Brownsville (63 miles (101 km))

Two airports across the border have passenger service: General Lucio Blanco International Airport (REX) in Reynosa and General Servando Canales International Airport (MAM) in Matamoros.

== See also ==
- List of airports in Texas
