= Administradora Coahuilense de Infraestructura y Transporte Aéreo =

- Company type: Government-owned corporation
- Industry: Aviation
- Founded: 2012
- Headquarters: Saltillo, Mexico
- Products: Airport operations

Administradora Coahuilense de Infraestructura y Transporte Aéreo (ACITA; transl. Coahuila Infrastructure and Air Transport Administrator) is the operator of four airports in the State of Coahuila, Mexico.

== Operating Airports ==
Coahuila AirportsAeropuertos de Coahuila
Airport	City	State	ICAO	IATA	Coordinates
Ciudad Acuña International Airport	Ciudad Acuña	Coahuila	MMCC	ACN	29.3339°N 101.1008°W
Monclova International Airport	Monclova	Coahuila	MMMV	LOV	26.9544°N 101.4705°W
Piedras Negras International Airport	Piedras Negras	Coahuila	MMPG	PDS	28.6275°N 100.5353°W
Saltillo Airport	Saltillo	Coahuila	MMIO	SLW	25.5494°N 100.9286°W
Constitucionalista Airfield	Cuatro Ciénegas	Coahuila	MM64	N/A	26.989735°N 102.038563°W
Múzquiz Airfield	Múzquiz	Coahuila	MM42	N/A	27.857717°N 101.52709°W
Carboniferous Region Airfield	Nueva Rosita	Coahuila	N/A	N/A	27.972°N 101.204826°W

It is a company incorporated under SA with 51% by the Government of the State of Coahuila, and 49% ACITA (Administradora Coahuilense de Infraestructura y Transporte Aéreo).

== Passenger's number ==
Number of passengers at each airport by 2025:

Rank	Airport	City	State	Passengers
1	Saltillo Airport	Saltillo	Coahuila	17,513
2	Piedras Negras International Airport	Piedras Negras	Coahuila	5,285
Total				22,798

== See also ==
- List of the busiest airports in Mexico
