= Valley International Airport =

Airport in Harlingen, Texas

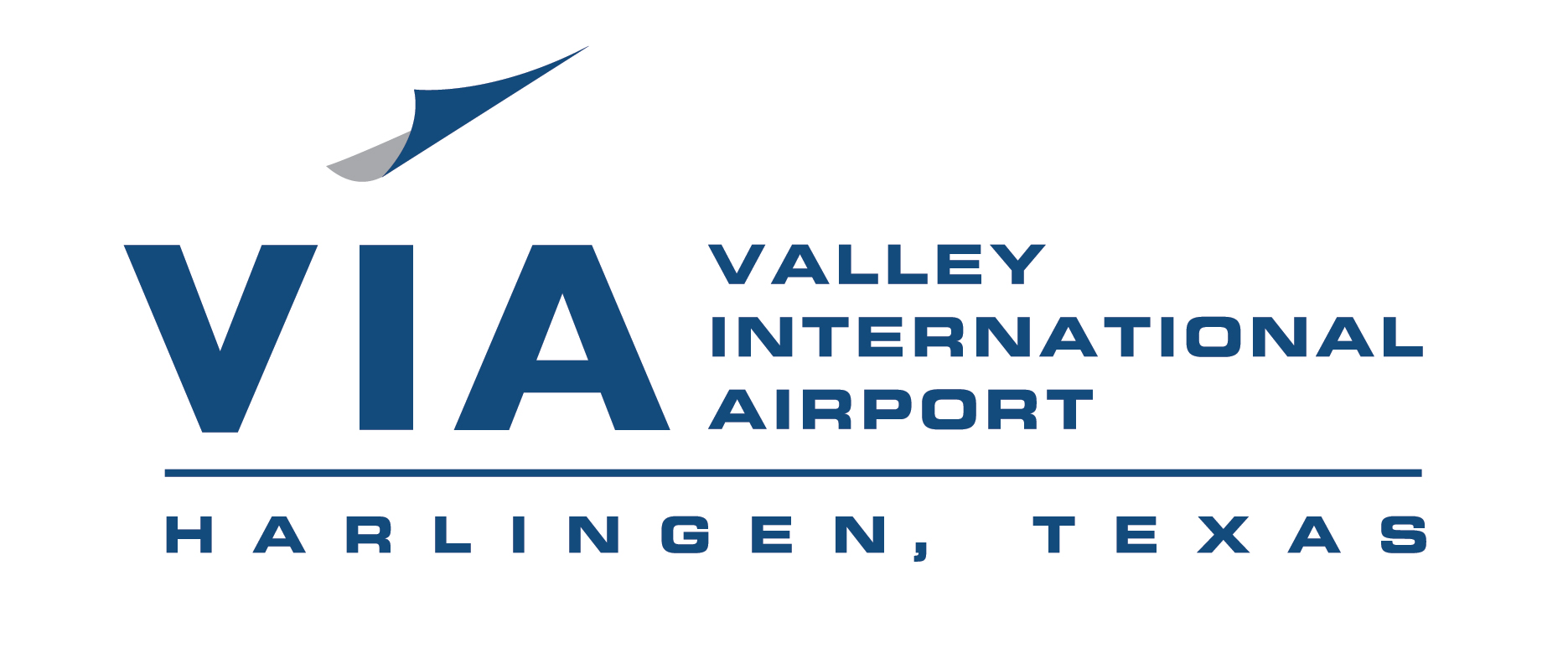

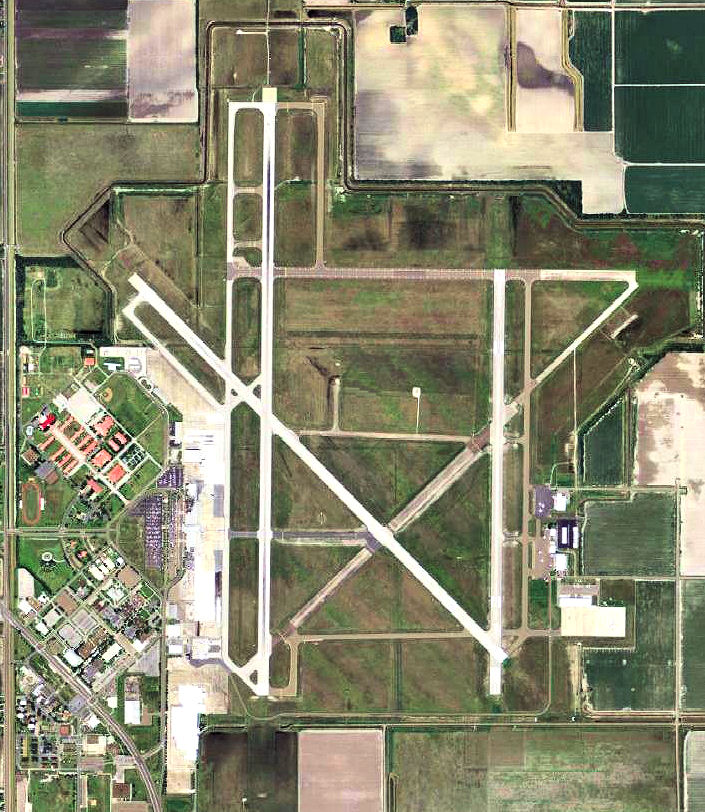
- USGS 2006 orthophoto
- IATA: HRL; ICAO: KHRL; FAA LID: HRL

Summary
- Airport type: Public
- Owner: City of Harlingen
- Serves: Harlingen, Texas
- Elevation AMSL: 36 ft (11 m)
- Coordinates: 26°13′38″N 097°39′18″W
- Website: www.FlyTheValley.com

Map
- Interactive map of Valley International Airport

Runways
Direction	Length		Surface
Direction	ft	m	Surface
18R/36L	9,400	2,865	Asphalt
13/31	7,257	2,212	Asphalt
18L/36R	5,950	1,814	Asphalt

Statistics (2025)
- Total passengers: 977,000
- Aircraft operations: 39,785
- Source: Federal Aviation Administration

Valley International Airport (VIA) (IATA: HRL, ICAO: KHRL, FAA LID: HRL) is a regional airport owned by the city of Harlingen, in Cameron County, Texas, United States. It is operated by a nine-member airport board appointed by the mayor. HRL is centrally located in the Rio Grande Valley (RGV) and is referred to as the "Gateway to South Padre Island" with travel amenities and door to door transportation to South Padre Island. With over 2,500 acres (1,000 ha) HRL is the largest airport in the RGV with room for future expansion. HRL has the longest runways in the area with modern aircraft approach systems that minimize chances of delays during bad weather.

As of 2024, the airport is served by Southwest Airlines, United Airlines (via United Express), American Airlines (via American Eagle), Delta Air Lines (seasonally), and Sun Country Airlines (seasonally). Destinations served nonstop from the airport include Austin, Cancún, Chicago (ORD), both Dallas/Fort Worth International Airport and Dallas Love Field, Houston (both Houston George Bush Intercontinental Airport and Houston Hobby Airport), and Minneapolis/St. Paul. The airport is also a large air cargo port ranked in the top 80 airports in the United States and is served by FedEx and DHL wide body jet freighters.

The National Plan of Integrated Airport Systems for 2011–2015 categorized it as a primary commercial service airport.

== History ==
Harlingen Air Force Base closed in 1962; a 1961 budget by President John F. Kennedy proposed to close 70 air bases in the U.S., and the military airfield was turned over to the City of Harlingen and then converted to civil use as Harlingen Industrial Airport. In 1967, following Hurricane Beulah, the original Harlingen civil airport, Harlingen Municipal Airport/Harvey Richards Field (at 26.206°N 97.754°W, where the Harlingen Country Club is now located) was permanently closed due to wind and flood damage and all civil aviation operations shifted to Harlingen Industrial Airport.

The airport was later renamed Harlingen Regional Airport until it was renamed to its current name of Valley International Airport. Despite its closure as an active military installation, Valley International Airport still sees approximately 50% of its flight operations consisting of military aircraft. These are primarily U.S. Air Force and U.S. Navy training aircraft originating from multiple Air Force bases and Naval Air Stations in southern and central Texas.

=== Past airline service ===
From 1947–48 to 1960, Trans-Texas Airways (TTa) Douglas DC-3s served Harlingen Air Force Base under a joint civil-military airport agreement; in 1960, Harvey Richards Field received a new 4900-ft runway, and TTa moved their operations there until the airline moved its flights back to the former air force base following Hurricane Beulah.

The first jet service into Harlingen was operated by Trans-Texas Airways with Douglas DC-9-10s at the end of 1967. In 1968, Trans-Texas DC-9s flew nonstop to Corpus Christi and Houston Hobby Airport as well as direct to Dallas Love Field, Little Rock, Arkansas, and Memphis, Tennessee. Trans-Texas flights to Mexico started in 1967; in 1968, TTa Convair 600 turboprops flew nonstop to Monterrey, Mexico, and Tampico, Mexico, with one-stop service to Veracruz, Mexico. TTa Convair 600s also flew to Austin, Corpus Christi, Dallas, Houston, Laredo, San Antonio and other Texas cities. Flights from Harlingen to Mexico ended in 1971–72. Trans-Texas Airways subsequently changed its name to Texas International Airlines and continued to serve Harlingen.

In 1978, all Texas International (TI) flights from the airport were operated with DC-9 jets with nonstops to Austin and Houston Intercontinental Airport; TI flew direct to Los Angeles (LAX) via Houston, Dallas/Fort Worth International Airport and Albuquerque. Texas International pulled out of HRL in 1979, but later merged with Continental Airlines which in turn began serving Harlingen. Continental then merged with United Airlines which continues to serve the airport at the present time via United Express with Canadair CRJ-700s operated by SkyWest Airlines.

Mainline jets operated into the airport in the past included American Airlines Boeing 727-100s and Boeing 727-200s, Braniff International Airways Boeing 727-200s and Continental Airlines Boeing 727-100s, Douglas DC-9-10s and McDonnell Douglas DC-9-30s. In 1982, Braniff 727s flew nonstop to Dallas/Fort Worth three times a day with continuing direct service to Chicago, Denver and Omaha In 1987, Continental was operating DC-9 nonstops to Houston (IAH) with continuing service to Baton Rouge, Chicago, Minneapolis/St. Paul and Omaha. In 1989, American flew four nonstop 727-200s to Dallas/Fort Worth (DFW) and one 727-200 nonstop to Houston (IAH) while Continental had three daily nonstops to Houston (IAH), one 727-100 and two DC-9-10s. By 1999, American Eagle ATR-72 turboprops had replaced American jets with nonstop service to Dallas/Fort Worth while Continental Express ATR-42 turboprops had replaced Continental jets with nonstop service to Houston Intercontinental.

Southwest Airlines began serving Harlingen as an intrastate airline in 1975 with Boeing 737-200 jets. Harlingen was the fourth new destination served by Southwest following its initial flights from Dallas Love Field, Houston Hobby Airport and San Antonio in 1971. In 1979, Southwest Boeing 727-200s and Boeing 737-200s served HRL. In 1986, Southwest was operating ten weekday 737 flights from the airport with seven nonstops to Houston Hobby Airport, two nonstops to San Antonio and one nonstop to Austin. In addition, eight flights a day operated by Southwest served Dallas Love Field on a direct one stop basis. Today, Southwest is the largest airline at HRL, accounting for approximately 62% of the airport's airline market share. Southwest currently serves Harlingen with Boeing 737-700, 737-800, and 737 MAX 8 aircraft.

In the late 1970s and early 1980s, Mexicana de Aviacion Boeing 727-100s flew nonstop to Mexico City and to Monterrey.

Sun Country Airlines flew Boeing 727-200s and wide body McDonnell Douglas DC-10s into the airport from Minneapolis/St. Paul during winter months in the past and continues to serve Harlingen seasonally with Boeing 737-800s.

Delta Air Lines began seasonal Airbus A320 service to Harlingen in 2013 from its Minneapolis/St. Paul hub; Delta Connection also operated the route seasonally with Canadair CRJ-900 regional jets, but that service was suspended following the COVID-19 Pandemic. Delta resumed the daily in February–April 2023.

Frontier Airlines commenced nonstop service to Harlingen as Frontier's 100th destination city with Airbus A320s between both Denver (DEN) and Harlingen and Chicago–O'Hare (ORD) and Harlingen in November 2018. The ORD-HRL service then ceased in November 2019. The ORD-HRL route was subsequently picked up by American Airlines (via American Eagle) regional jet flights on March 6, 2021. However, Frontier began nonstop flights between both Las Vegas (LAS) and Harlingen and Orlando (MCO) and Harlingen in 2021. Frontier terminated service in Harlingen in August 2022 in light of crew shortages.

Viva began twice weekly A320 service to Harlingen from its Monterrey, Mexico hub on May 6, 2021. Service ceased in June 2022, after the reopening of the United States-Mexico bridges.

=== Commemorative Air Force ===
In 1968, the Commemorative Air Force (CAF), then known as the Confederate Air Force (CAF), relocated from Mercedes, Texas, to what was then Harlingen Industrial Airport, leasing three former USAF buildings and a section of flightline ramp area, to include 26,000 square feet of museum space. An American non-profit organization, the CAF was officially founded in 1961 to restore and preserve historically significant former military combat aircraft of the World War II era, with the vast majority maintained in an operational flying condition for historical education, aerial demonstrations, and airshows. The name, which was originally chosen as a tongue-in-cheek joke referring to the organization's ragtag beginnings, never had anything to do with the American Civil War or the former Confederate States of America. Over the next twenty-two years, the CAF continued to expand, with additional elements established and additional historical aircraft based at other airports across the United States while the organization's headquarters, museum, and main operating base remained at Harlingen.

By 1990, the CAF had outgrown the Harlingen facility with no further room to expand. Upon conclusion of its lease, the CAF, its museum, and that portion of its aircraft based at Harlingen relocated to larger facilities at the then-Midland International Airport in Midland, Texas.

In November 2000, the group voted to rename, using the initials "CAF" until a permanent name was selected. Following a 2001 membership vote, the group changed its name to the current Commemorative Air Force, effective January 1, 2002. Many felt the name Confederate Air Force was confusing, did not accurately reflect the true purpose of the organization, and was detrimental to fundraising efforts. According to then-CAF chief of staff Ray Kinney, "In many people's minds, the word 'confederacy' brings up the image of slavery and discrimination. We, in no way, are associated with that kind of stuff. So, it gives us, in a way, a black eye." Per a 2014 decision, in 2015 and 2016 the CAF headquarters, its museum, and its headquarters-based aircraft relocated to their present home of Dallas Executive Airport in Dallas, Texas.

== Facilities ==
Valley International Airport covers 2,508 acres (1,015 ha) at an elevation of 36 feet (11 m). It has three asphalt runways: 18R/36L is 9,400 by 150 feet (2,865 x 46 m); 13/31 is 7,257 by 150 feet (2,212 x 46 m); 18L/36R is 5,950 by 150 feet (1,814 x 46 m).

In the year ending December 31, 2022, Valley International Airport had 57,602 aircraft operations, averaging 158 per day: 58% military, 18% general aviation, 19% airline, and 5% air taxi. 56 aircraft were then based at the airport: 35 single-engine, 12 multi-engine, and 9 jet.

== Airlines and destinations ==
=== Passenger ===
Airlines	Destinations
American Eagle	Dallas/Fort Worth; Seasonal: Chicago–O'Hare (begins December 19, 2026)
Delta Air Lines	Seasonal: Minneapolis/St. Paul
Southwest Airlines	Austin, Dallas–Love, Houston–Hobby; Seasonal: Las Vegas (begins June 5, 2027)
Sun Country Airlines	Seasonal: Cancún, Minneapolis/St. Paul
United Express	Houston–Intercontinental

Domestic destinations map
Domestic destinations from Valley International Airport
Red = Year-round destination
Green = Seasonal destination
Blue = Future destination

International destinations map
International destinations from Valley International Airport
Red = Year-round destination
Green = Seasonal destination
Blue = Future destination

=== Cargo ===
Airlines	Destinations
DHL Aviation	Cincinnati
FedEx Express	Memphis

== Statistics ==
=== Top destinations ===
Top domestic routes from HRL (June 2025 – May 2026)
Rank	City	Passengers	Carriers
1	Houston–Hobby, Texas	158,710	Southwest
2	Dallas/Fort Worth, Texas	91,160	American
3	Austin, Texas	78,720	Southwest
4	Houston–Intercontinental, Texas	64,520	United
5	Dallas–Love, Texas	50,080	Southwest
6	Minneapolis/Saint Paul, Minnesota	37,660	Delta, Sun Country

=== Airline market share ===
Largest airlines at HRL (June 2025 – May 2026)
Rank	Airline	Passengers	Share
1	Southwest Airlines	574,000	59.86%
2	Envoy Air (doing business as American Eagle)	158,000	16.52%
3	CommuteAir (doing business as United Express)	112,000	11.71%
4	Delta Air Lines	38,510	4.02%
5	Sun Country Airlines	36,640	3.82%
	Other	38,970	4.06%

== Airport design ==
- The Valley International Airport has seven gates. Sun Country operates at Gate 1, Delta at Gate 2, American at Gate 4, Southwest at Gates 5 and 6, and United at Gate 7.

== Services ==
- Shopping and dining options include Island Restaurant and Coffee, Jackson Street Café & Bar, The Paradies Shops, Padre Pub, and Pelican Bar.
- A parking lot shuttle and a shuttle to South Padre Island are available.

== Accidents and incidents ==
- On August 18, 1975, a Confederate Air Force Consolidated PBY Catalina crashed after takeoff due to right engine failure and the propeller not being feathered. Three occupants out of the five on board were killed.
- On April 2, 2012, United Express Flight 4128 made an emergency landing at Corpus Christi after it suffered damage to its front landing gear and also experienced a flat tire. The flight originated in Harlingen and was heading to George Bush Intercontinental Airport in Houston. There were 37 passengers on board and there were no injuries. The aircraft was an Embraer ERJ-145 regional jet operated by ExpressJet on a code sharing flight on behalf of United Airlines.

== Area airports ==
- Brownsville/South Padre Island International Airport (BRO) – Brownsville, Texas (20 miles)
- McAllen Miller International Airport (MFE) – McAllen, Texas (40 miles)

== See also ==
- List of airports in Texas
