= Aerus (airline) =

Mexican regional carrier airline

| IATA | ICAO | Call sign |
|---|---|---|
| ZV | RFD | RAFILHER |
- Founded: 1990; 36 years ago (as Aerotransportes Rafilher); 30 May 2022; 4 years ago (as Aerus)
- Commenced operations: 27 April 2023; 3 years ago
- Hubs: Monterrey
- Focus cities: Mexico City–AIFA
- Fleet size: 8
- Destinations: 15
- Parent company: Grupo Herrera
- Headquarters: Monterrey, Nuevo León, Mexico
- Key people: Javier Herrera García (CEO)
- Website: flyaerus.com

Aerus, legally Aerotransportes Rafilher S.A. de C.V., is a Mexican regional carrier founded in 2022, and started operations in April 2023. It is based in Monterrey International Airport.

== History ==
Aerus was founded in May 2022 by Grupo Herrera, following local government approval. It was originally founded in 1990 in San Luis Potosí as Aerotransportes Rafilher, for air taxi services. The airline is planned to launch in the first quarter of 2023, seeking to operate flights to destinations with no current air service.

In January 2023, the airline ordered 30 all-electric Eviation Alice aircraft. In February 2023, reports indicated that Aerus is planning to expand operations, aiming to have 14 aircraft and 500 employees by 2025. The airline is planning an investment of US$98 million as part of the expansion effort. The airline is also planning to recruit former employees of Aeromar, an airline that closed operations earlier in February 2025.

In April 2025, Aerus entered into a codeshare agreement with Viva Aerobus, enabling increased connectivity and coordinated flight offerings between the two airlines.

== Destinations ==
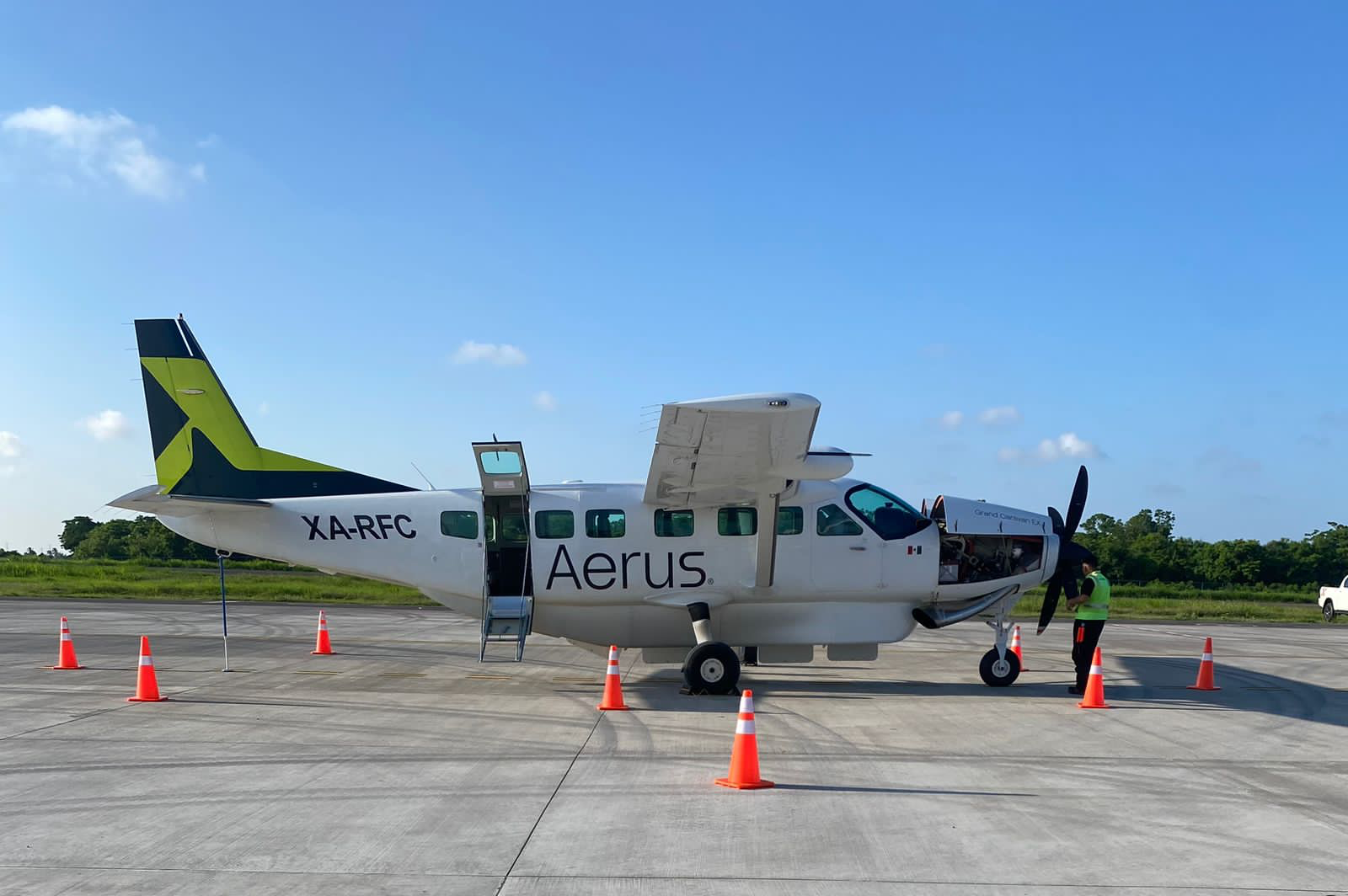
Aerus' Cessna Grand Caravan EX

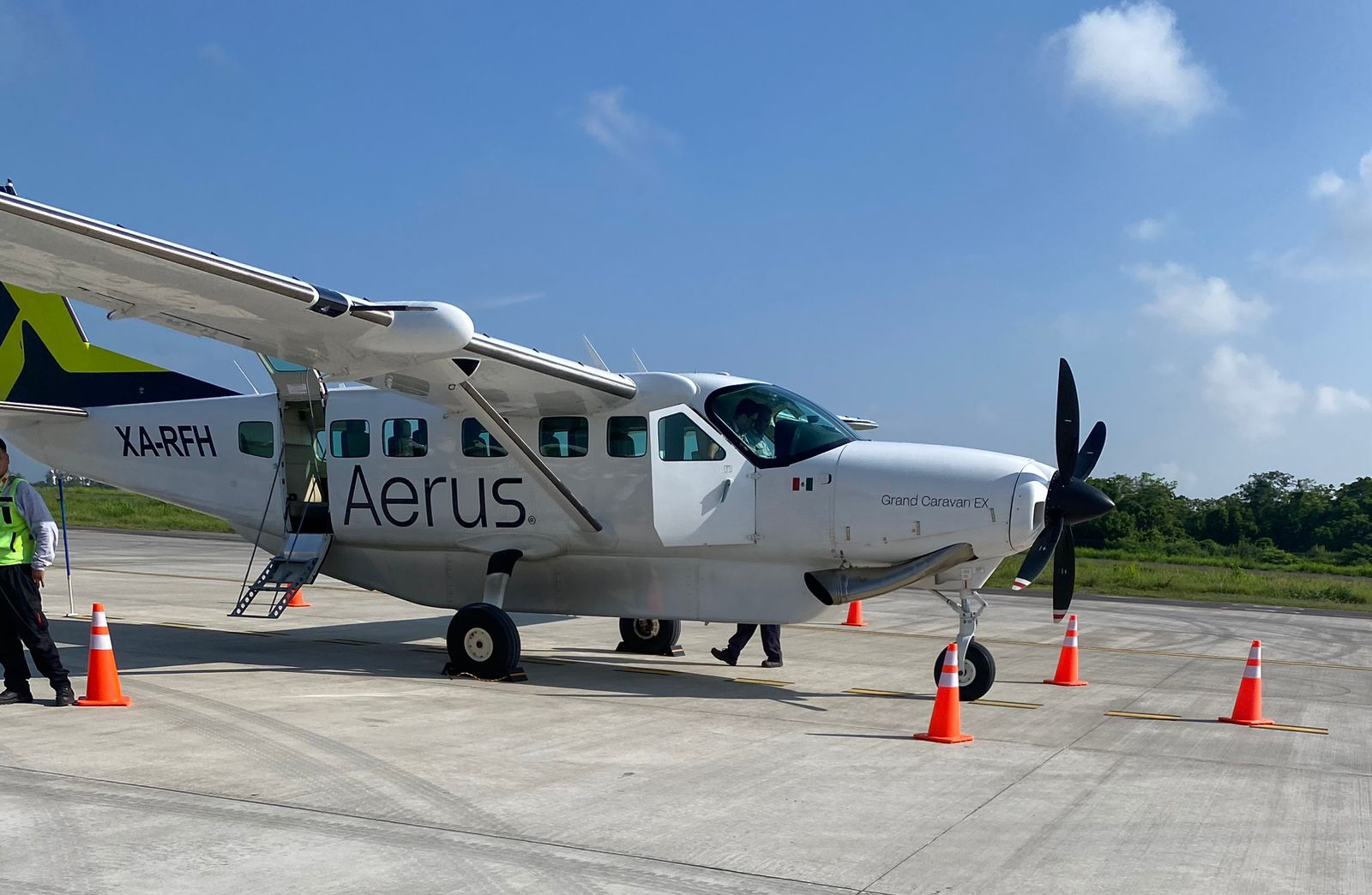
Aerus' Cessna Grand Caravan EX

The airline plans to operate both domestic and international flights in the Northeastern and Gulf of Mexico regions, using Textron Aviation-built Cessna aircraft. It is intended to occupy routes previously served by Aeromar.

| Country | City | Airport | Notes |
|---|---|---|---|
| Mexico | Aguascalientes | Aguascalientes International Airport | |
| Mexico | Ciudad Victoria | Ciudad Victoria International Airport | |
| Mexico | Durango | Durango International Airport | |
| Mexico | Ixtepec | Ixtepec Airport | |
| Mexico | Mérida | Mérida International Airport | |
| Mexico | Mexico City | Felipe Ángeles International Airport | |
| Mexico | Monterrey | Monterrey International Airport | Hub |
| Mexico | Piedras Negras | Piedras Negras International Airport | |
| Mexico | San Luis Potosi | San Luis Potosí International Airport | |
| Mexico | Tampico | Tampico International Airport | |
| Mexico | Veracruz | Veracruz International Airport | |
| Mexico | Villahermosa | Villahermosa International Airport | |
| United States (Texas) | Brownsville | Brownsville/South Padre Island International Airport | |
| United States (Texas) | Laredo | Laredo International Airport | |
| United States (Texas) | McAllen | McAllen Miller International Airport | |

== Fleet ==
| Aircraft | Total | Orders | Passengers | Notes |
|---|---|---|---|---|
| Cessna 408 SkyCourier | — | 2 | 19 | |
| Cessna Grand Caravan EX | 8 | — | 9 | |
| Eviation Alice | — | 30 | 9 | Deliveries expected after 2030 |
| Total | 8 | 32 | | |

== Accidents and incidents ==
- On July 13, 2026, an Aerus Cessna Grand Caravan EX, operating as Flight 165, had made an emergency landing in a forest in Pesquería, Nuevo Leon on approach to Monterrey International Airport from Piedras Negras, leaving 3 injured. Reports suggested that a bird strike had been the cause of the accident. Rescue teams were dispatched at the site.

== See also ==
- List of active mexican airlines
- Lists of airlines
