= Saltillo Airport =

International airport serving Saltillo, Coahuila, Mexico

Saltillo International Airport Aeropuerto Internacional de Saltillo
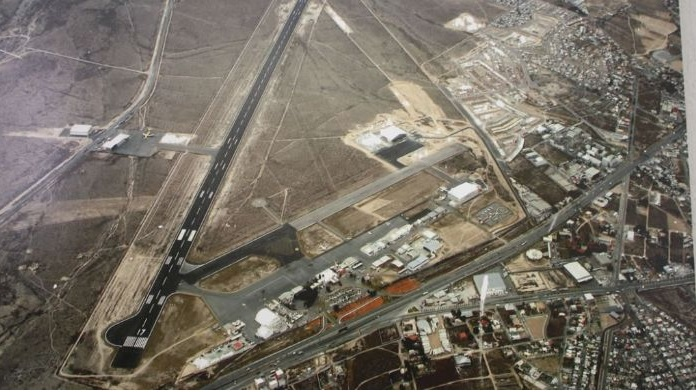
- IATA: SLW; ICAO: MMIO

Summary
- Airport type: Public
- Operator: Administradora Coahuilense de Infraestructura y Transporte Aéreo
- Serves: Saltillo, Coahuila, Mexico
- Location: Ramos Arizpe, Coahuila, Mexico
- Hub for: Aeronaves TSM
- Time zone: CST (UTC-06:00)
- Elevation AMSL: 1,456 m (4,777 ft)
- Coordinates: 25°32′58″N 100°55′43″W

Maps
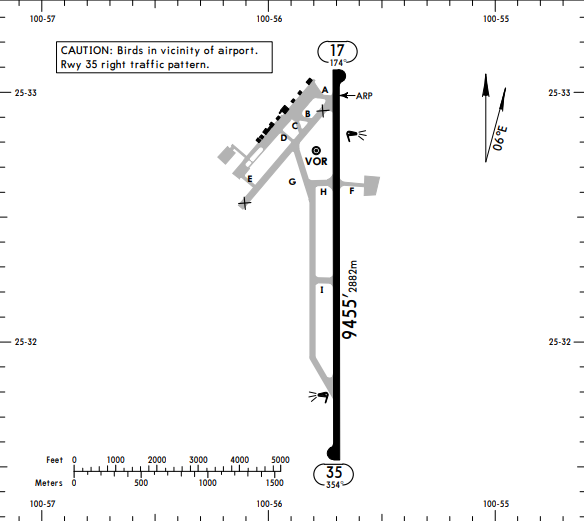

- Location of the airport in Coahuila SLW (Mexico)

Runways
Direction	Length		Surface
Direction	m	ft	Surface
17/35	2,897	9,505	Asphalt
~~03/21~~; Closed	~~1,058~~	~~3,471~~	~~Asphalt~~

Statistics (2025)
- Total passengers: 17,513
- Ranking in Mexico: 56th
- Source: Administradora Coahuilense de Infraestructura y Transporte Aéreo

Saltillo International Airport (Spanish: Aeropuerto Internacional de Saltillo); officially Aeropuerto Internacional Plan de Guadalupe (Plan de Guadalupe International Airport) (IATA: SLW, ICAO: MMIO), is an international airport situated in Ramos Arizpe, Coahuila, Mexico. It serves the Metropolitan Area of Saltillo, handling domestic flights, executive and general aviation, flight training, and international cargo operations. It also functions as a hub for the cargo airline Aeronaves TSM.

It is operated by the state-owned Administradora Coahuilense de Infraestructura y Transporte Aéreo. Historically, Saltillo Airport has been served by various airlines, including Continental Express, Mexicana, MexicanaClick, Aeromexico Connect, Taesa, Aeromar, TAR and BAX Global. The airport handled 17,513 passengers in 2025.

== Facilities ==
The airport is situated at an elevation of 1,456 metres (4,777 ft) above mean sea level and features a single runway, designated 17/35, with an asphalt surface measuring 2,897 by 45 metres (9,505 by 148 ft). Additionally, a second runway (now closed), designated 03/21, had an asphalt surface measuring 1,058 by 45 metres (3,471 by 148 ft).

The airport's passenger terminal, built in 1987, includes essential facilities such as a ticketing and check-in area, customs and migration facilities, baggage claim areas, and a cafeteria. It gained international category designation in the same year.

== Airlines and destinations ==
=== Passenger ===
Airlines	Destinations	Refs
Aeroméxico Connect	Mexico City–Benito Juárez (resumes March 18, 2027)	
Viva	Cancún, Mexico City–Felipe Ángeles	
Volaris	Guadalajara (begins December 1, 2026)	

=== Destinations map ===
Domestic destinations from Saltillo International Airport
Red = Year-round destination
Blue = Future destination
Green = Seasonal destination

== Accidents ==
On July 6, 2008, USA Jet Airlines flight 199, a McDonnell Douglas DC-9-15, crashed at 2:15a.m. as the freighter approached the airport. The flight originated in Hamilton, Ontario, and stopped in Shreveport, Louisiana, en route to Saltillo. The crash killed the pilot and injured the co-pilot, who suffered severe burns.

On September 15, 2022, an Aeronaves TSM Fairchild Swearingen Metroliner XA-UMW took off from Runway 15 at Saltillo, climbed to approximately 800 feet AGL and experienced an engine failure and extreme vibrations from the right-hand engine. The aircraft subsequently made a forced landing 2.4nm north of the airport. The flight crew were taken to hospital for a checkup but were promptly discharged. The aircraft received substantial damage.

== Statistics ==
=== Annual Traffic ===
Traffic at SLW by calendar year
Year	Operations	Passengers	Cargo (t)
2008	3,348	101,550	4,134
2009	2,922	77,521	4,366
2010	4,065	74,795	6,399
2011	5,085	96,107	3,855
2012	5,399	110,054	2,866
2013	5,723	116,008	4,805
2014	3,346	86,337	3,065
2015	2,161	74,419	1,579
2016	1,875	65,955	2,072
2017	2,725	71,621	7,486
2018	2,740	42,533	10,436
2019	2,076	33,122	10,125
2020	2,017	3,579	12,502
2021	1,851	4,665	13,279
2022	1,467	3,140	6,330
2023	1,438	1,417	6,052
2024	2,597	40	32,686
2025	2,384	17,513	21,081

== See also ==
- List of airports in Mexico
- List of the busiest airports in Mexico
- List of busiest airports in North America
- List of the busiest airports in Latin America
- List of airports by ICAO code: M
- Airline destinations
- Transportation in Mexico
- Tourism in Mexico
- Administradora Coahuilense de Infraestructura y Transporte Aéreo
- Monterrey International Airport
