= Tejas Airlines =

US commuter airline

Coordinates: 29°25′30″N 98°29′38″W

Tejas Airlines was a regional airline based in San Antonio, Texas, with scheduled passenger service operated to several destinations within Texas.

== History ==
Tejas Airlines commenced operations in 1977 (49 years ago) with service to five destinations in Texas and then expanded its flights to eight cities.

== Destinations ==
In 1979, Tejas Airlines was serving seven cities in Texas.

- Austin, Texas (AUS)
- Brownsville, Texas (BRO)
- Corpus Christi, Texas (CRP)
- Houston, William P. Hobby Airport (HOU)
- Laredo, Texas (LRD)
- McAllen, Texas (MFE)
- San Antonio (SAT) - Hub and home base

== Fleet ==
Tejas operated the following aircraft throughout its lifetime.

- Fairchild Swearingen Metroliner Metro II
- Piper PA-31 Navajo

== Incidents and accidents ==
13 August 1978 - At San Antonio, the Metro II commuter plane was refueled in the right wing with 125 gallons. After an 18-minute flight, while approaching Austin, the left engine failed due to fuel starvation. Failing to assure if the landing gear was down and locked, the crew continued their approach to runway 12R. After touchdown, the plane veered off the runway. It appeared that the crossflow valve had been off during the entire flight, thereby disabling fuel flow from the right wing tank to the fuel tank in the left wing.

== Bankruptcy ==
Tejas Airlines filed for Chapter 11 bankruptcy in December 1980 (45 years ago).

== See also ==
- List of defunct airlines of the United States
