= Aeronaves TSM =

Mexican airline

IATA	ICAO	Call sign
-	VTM	AERONAVES TSM
- Founded: 1995; 31 years ago
- Commenced operations: 1995; 31 years ago
- Hubs: Saltillo Airport
- Fleet size: 82
- Headquarters: Saltillo, Mexico
- Website: www.aeronavestsm.com

Aeronaves TSM is a Mexican cargo charter airline headquartered in Saltillo and based at Saltillo Airport.

== Operations ==
The company was founded in 1995, and operates both chartered flights and cargo flights. Their aircraft are used for cargo operations and are operated for DHL Aviation. Aeronaves TSM also provides flight training and ground school. Aeronaves TSM averages about 10,000 charter operations every year and 30 flights per day.

== Fleet ==
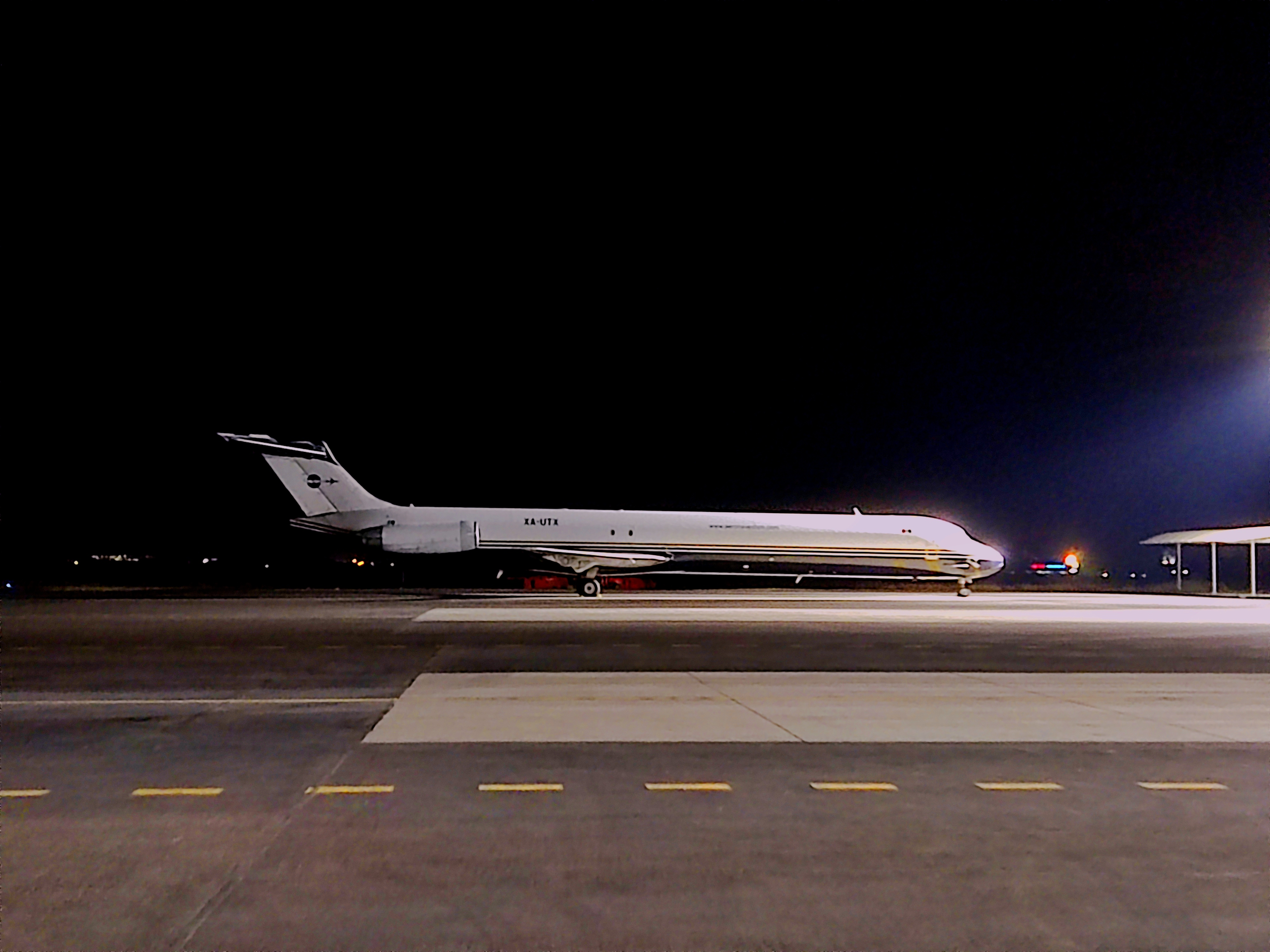
Aeronaves TSM McDonnell Douglas MD-82(SF)

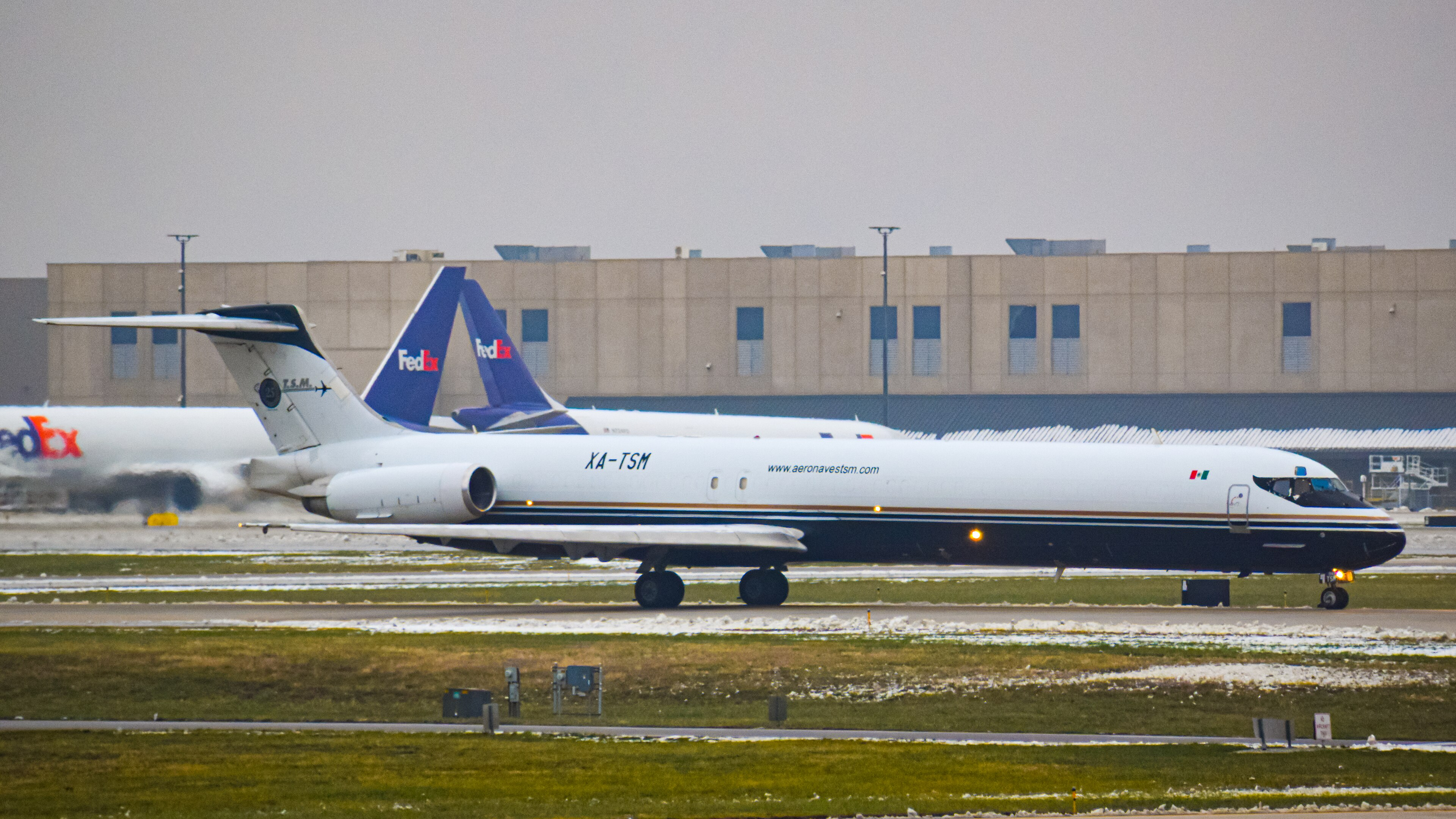
Aeronaves TSM McDonnell Douglas MD-83(SF)

As of August 2025, Aeronaves TSM operates the following aircraft:

Aeronaves TSM fleet
Aircraft	In service	Order	Passengers	Notes
Boeing 737-300SF	2	—		
Boeing 737-300BDSF	1			—
Boeing 737-300QC	1			—
Boeing 737-400SF	20			
Bombardier CRJ100ER	1			
Bombardier CRJ100PF	1			
Bombardier CRJ200ER(SF)	20			
Bombardier CRJ200LR	1			
Bombardier CRJ200LR(PF)	1			
McDonnell Douglas DC-9-15F	2			
McDonnell Douglas DC-9-15MC	2			
McDonnell Douglas DC-9-15RC	3			
McDonnell Douglas DC-9-32CF	2			
McDonnell Douglas DC-9-32F	3			
McDonnell Douglas DC-9-33CF	1			
McDonnell Douglas DC-9-33F	4			
McDonnell Douglas DC-9-33RC	2			
McDonnell Douglas MD-82SF	4			
McDonnell Douglas MD-83SF	11			
Total	82			

== Accidents and incidents ==
- On 18 January 2014, an Aeronaves TSM McDonnell Douglas DC-9-33RC with registration XA-UQM was significantly damaged at Saltillo Airport. It touched down on the last third of the runway and the nose gear collapsed. The probable cause was the crew not seeing the runway properly due to dense fog, so they touched down hard and braked too much resulting in landing gear collapsing.
- On 2 June 2015, an Aeronaves TSM Swearingen SA226-TC Metro II with the registration of XA-UKP was on a post-maintenance test flight from Querétaro Intercontinental Airport (QRO). After reaching 9,000 feet of altitude, the crew most likely lost control of the aircraft and crashed in Highway 57. The probable cause of the loss of control is still undetermined.
- On 2 June 2017, an Aeronaves TSM Swearingen SA227-AC Metro III with registration XA-UAJ, crash landed at Tampico International Airport, Mexico, due to aircraft fuel exhaustion. The aircraft departed Saltillo Airport at 21:27 on a non-scheduled cargo flight to Puebla, Mexico, carrying approximately 550 kg (1,210 lb) of cargo. Before departure, the plane needed about 2,000 lb (910 kg) of fuel. However, the flight took off without having been properly refueled with just 700 lb (320 kg) of fuel. At 22:27 hours the flight declared an emergency to the Mexico City ACC controller. The crew decided to divert to Tampico. They crash landed 850 meters from the start of the runway with both crew injured.
- On 15 September 2022, an Aeronaves TSM Fairchild Swearingen Metroliner XA-UMW took off from Runway 15 at Saltillo, climbed to approximately 800 feet AGL and experienced engine failure and extreme vibrations from the right hand engine. The aircraft subsequently made a forced landing 2.4 nmi (4.4 km) north of the airport. The flight crew were taken to hospital for a checkup but were promptly discharged. The aircraft suffered substantial damage.

== See also ==
- List of active Mexican airlines
- Lists of airlines
