= Aeromar =

Mexican airline

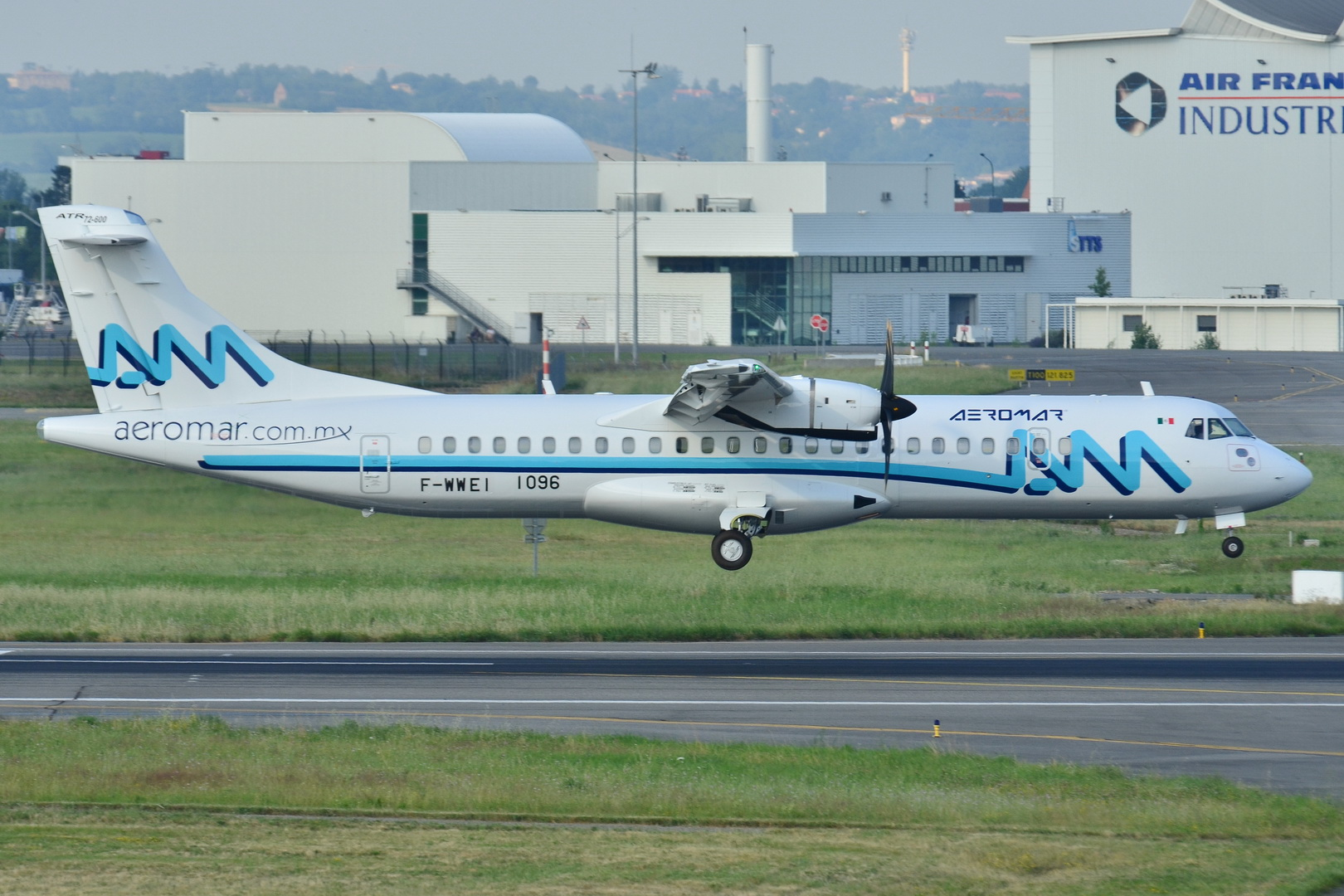
IATA	ICAO	Call sign
VW	TAO	AEROMAR
- Founded: January 29, 1987; 39 years ago
- Commenced operations: November 5, 1987; 38 years ago
- Ceased operations: February 15, 2023; 3 years ago
- AOC #: TVRF761K
- Hubs: Mexico City International Airport
- Secondary hubs: Guadalajara International Airport
- Frequent-flyer program: Aeroplan (affiliate); MileagePlus (affiliate)
- Fleet size: 9
- Destinations: 15
- Parent company: Grupo Aeromar
- Headquarters: Mexico City, Mexico
- Key people: Lic. Fernando Flores (President)
- Website: aeromar.mx/en

Transportes Aeromar, S.A. de C.V, doing business as Aeromar, was a Mexican airline that operated scheduled domestic services in Mexico and international services to the United States, and Cuba. Its main base was Mexico City International Airport.

The airline ceased all operations on February 15, 2023, following a financial collapse.

== History ==
=== Foundation and development ===
The airline was established on January 29, 1987, and started operations on November 7, 1987, as Transportes Aeromar.

It was owned by Grupo Aeromar (a private company) (99.99%) and had 864 employees in July 2010. On April 1, 2010, Aeromar signed a commercial alliance with Continental Airlines. Aeromar then announced it would lease two Bombardier CRJ200 regional jets. These twin-jet aircraft were subsequently removed from the airline's fleet.

On August 30, 2010, Aeromar and Continental Airlines announced a frequent flyer partnership that allowed each carrier's passengers to earn and redeem miles on either airline. In addition, Continental international first and business class passengers, Presidents Club members, and Star Alliance Gold customers were able to access Aeromar's Salon Aeromar lounge in Mexico City at that time. When Continental Airlines merged into United Airlines, the codeshare agreement was transferred over to United.

As of 2018, Avianca had expressed interest in acquiring or merging with Aeromar to become "Avianca Mexico". The airline awaited a 100 million USD injection from Avianca's parent company, Synergy Group. Avianca would've had to first acquire up to 49% of the airline over the next five months. The deal did not go through.

=== Demise ===
As of 2023, it was reported that the airline was $600 million USD in debt, primarily due to efforts to avoid a Mexican government financial collapse, and faced the possibility of cessation of operations after February 14, 2023. Operations had declined since 2020, impacted by the COVID-19 pandemic. At the same time, reports also emerged that Brazilian start-up carrier Nella Linhas Aéreas had acquired Aeromar, according to logo updates on its official website and social platforms. The deal was reported to be pending, but would not proceed if debts were not canceled by the Mexican Federal Government.

Aeromar announced on February 15, 2023, the definitive cessation of its operations, due to financial problems, after 35 years of flying uninterruptedly in Mexico, the United States, and Cuba. Aeromar owes over MX$5 billion pesos (US$268 million) to different creditors, including the Mexican authorities. Several laid off employees have been offered jobs for airlines such as Aeroméxico, Aerus, and Volaris.

== Destinations ==
=== Codeshare agreements ===
On February 1, 2011, Aeromar and Continental Airlines implemented codesharing on all routes at Aeromar's hub in Mexico City International Airport. Aeromar then started operating additional domestic services such as flights to Durango, Matamoros, Ixtapa, and Piedras Negras; and announced it would re-evaluate its international services. Currently, the only international destination served by the airline is McAllen, Texas although Aeromar previously served Austin, Texas and San Antonio, Texas. When Continental Airlines merged into United Airlines, the codeshare agreement was transferred over to United.

On August 1, 2019, Aeromar and Turkish Airlines signed a codeshare agreement, after the latter carrier commenced operations to Mexico City. On August 3, 2021, Aeromar and Emirates signed an interline partnership that will provide customers with connectivity between destinations in Mexico and the United States through Mexico City with the Emirates global network. On March 29, 2022, Aeromar and Air Canada signed an interline agreement to boost connectivity between Mexico and Canada. The agreement was planned to grow by the summer season.

== Fleet ==
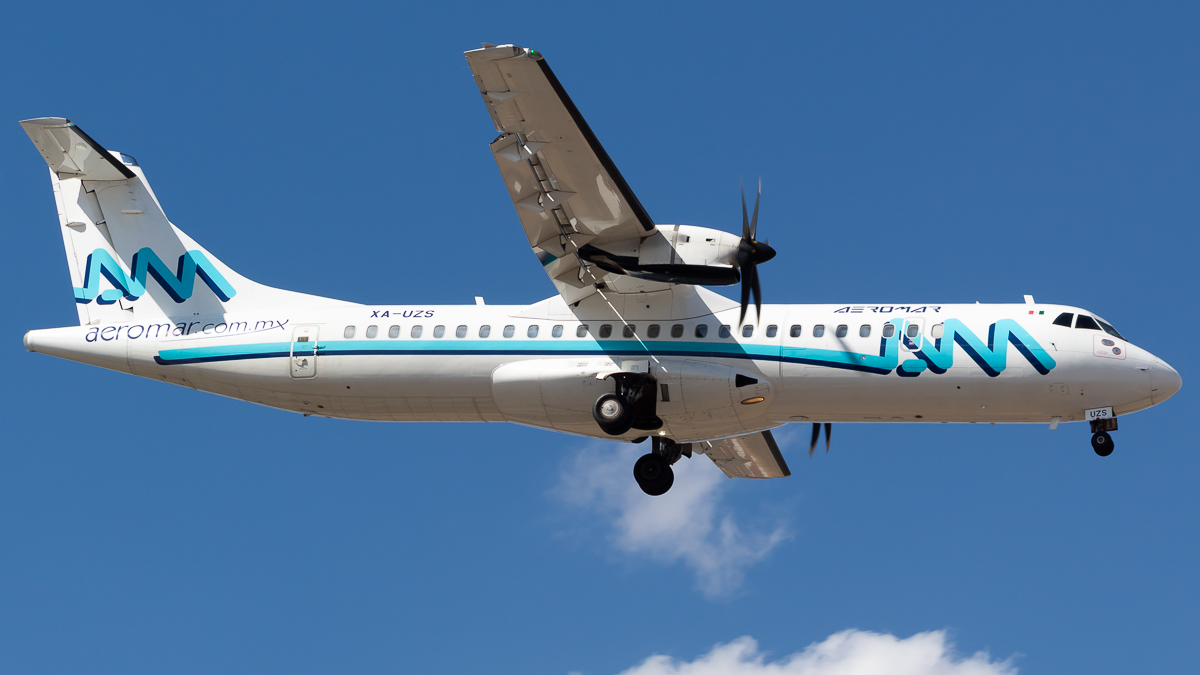
Aeromar ATR 72-600

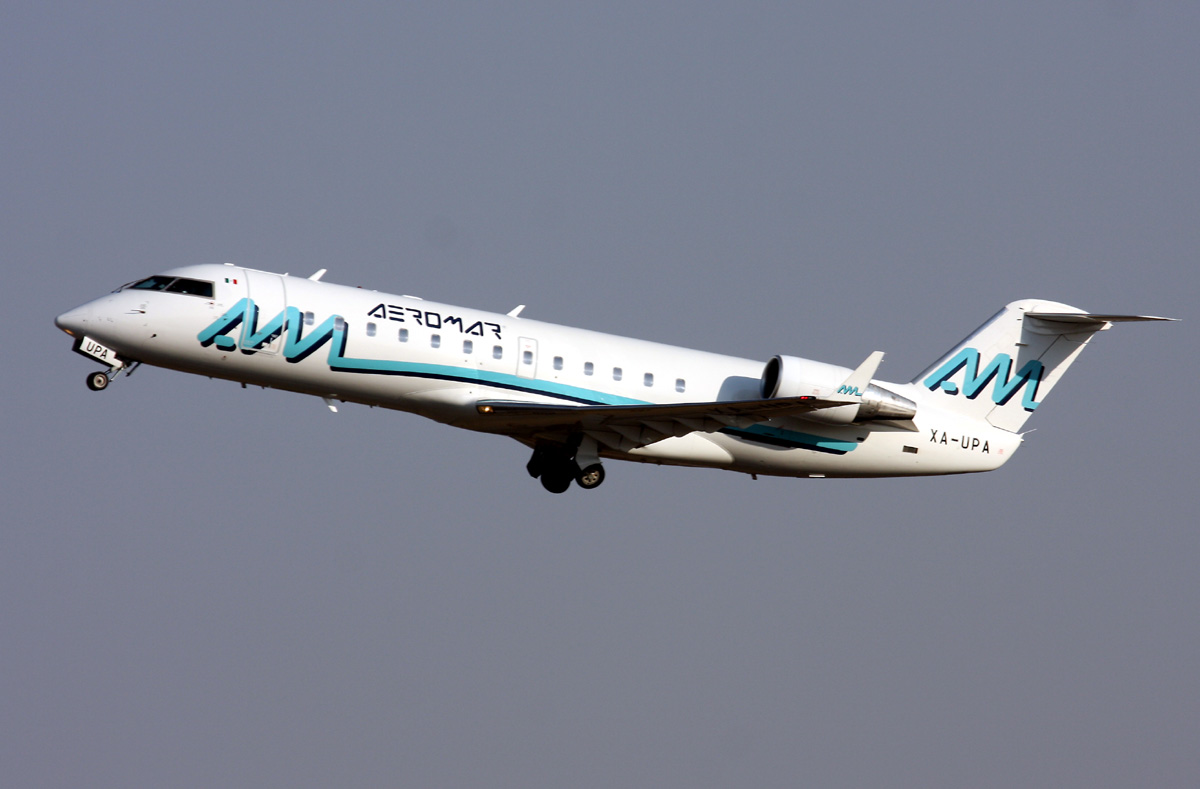
Aeromar Bombardier CRJ200

Over the years, the Aeromar fleet consisted the following aircraft:

Aeromar fleet
Aircraft	Total	Introduced	Retired	Notes
ATR 42-300	3	1988	1997	
ATR 42-320	8	1991	2018	
ATR 42-500	12	1998	2021	
ATR 42-600	3	2016	2023	
ATR 72-600	8	2016	2023	
Bombardier CRJ200	3	2010	2015	
IAI Arava	1	1987	1993	

=== Fleet development ===
In early 2015, Aeromar decided to remove its Bombardier CRJ200 regional jet aircraft from operations. The airline then supplemented its fleet of fifteen ATR 42 turboprops with two new larger ATR 72-600 aircraft. In November 2016, the airline ordered eight new ATR 42 and ATR 72 aircraft and optioned another six ATR 72s. Aeromar's first ATR 42-600 was handed over by the airframer in December 2016.

== Services ==
=== Frequent Flyer Programs ===
Aeromar participated in the United Airlines MileagePlus program and the Air Canada Aeroplan program, despite not being owned by United Airlines Holdings or Air Canada, nor being a member of Star Alliance, of which those airlines are currently a member.

=== Airport lounges ===
Salon Aeromar was Aeromar's private airport lounge.

== See also ==
- List of defunct airlines of Mexico
