= Atlangatepec Air Force Station =

Mexican Air Force Base in Atlangatepec, Tlaxcala, Mexico

Atlangatepec Air Force Station Estación Aérea Militar No. 9 Atlangatepec
- IATA: none; ICAO: MMTA; LID: TLX

Summary
- Airport type: Military
- Owner/Operator: Mexican Air Force
- Location: Atlangatepec, Tlaxcala, Mexico
- Built: 1982
- Time zone: CST (UTC-06:00)
- Elevation AMSL: 2,450 m / 8,038 ft
- Coordinates: 19°31′54″N 98°10′38″W
- Website: www.gob.mx/sedena

Map
- Location of the Air Force Station in Tlaxcala MMTA (Mexico)

Runways
Direction	Length		Surface
Direction	m	ft	Surface
01/19	2,510	8,235	Asphalt
- SEDENA

Atlangatepec Air Force Station (Spanish: Estación Aérea Militar Atlangatepec) "E.A.M. 9" (ICAO: MMTA, AFAC: TLX) is a military airport located in Atlangatepec, Tlaxcala, Mexico.

The airport was established in 1982 as Tlaxcala National Airport (Spanish: Aeropuerto Nacional de Tlaxcala); however, it did not achieve the desired success. The year with the highest recorded activity was 1994, during which only 24 air operations were conducted. On March 3, 1997, the Tlaxcala State Government transferred control of the airport to the Department of Defense SEDENA, leading to its designation as Tlaxcala Air Force Base (Base Aérea Militar N°19 Tlaxcala). In 2004, the Air Force Base underwent a transformation, being officially redesignated as Estación Aérea Militar N°9 Atlangatepec, signifying a change in its operational status.

Situated 14 kilometres (8.7 mi) north of Apizaco, the Air Force Station is situated at an elevation of 2,450 metres (8,040 ft) above sea level, it features one asphalt-surfaced runway, designated 01/19, measuring 2,510 metres (8,235 ft), and an apron measuring 1,420 square metres (15,285 sq ft) with parking positions for narrow-body aircraft and helipads. Adjacent facilities include a hangar, a control tower, and additional structures to house Air Force personnel.

This military airport is utilized by the 601st Air Squad, specializing in the operation of remotely piloted aerial vehicles, including Hydra S-45 Báalam, Hydra G-1 Guerrero, Hydra S-4 Ehécatl, Hydra E-1 Gavilán, ADS Dominator XP, Elbit Skylark and Elbit Hermes 450.

== See also ==
- List of airports in Mexico
- List of airports by ICAO code: M
- List of Mexican military installations
- Mexican Air Force
