= Mexican Air Force =

Air warfare branch of the Mexican Army

- Fuerza Aérea Mexicana
- Founded: 1913; 113 years ago
- Country: Mexico
- Branch: Mexican Army
- Type: Air force
- Role: Aerial warfare
- Size: 30,517 (2024)
- Part of: Mexican Armed Forces
- Nickname: FAM
- Mottos: Honor, Valor y Lealtad; "Honour, Courage and Loyalty"
- Anniversaries: 10 February
- Engagements: Mexican Revolution; World War II; Chiapas revolt; Mexican drug war
- Website: www.sedena.gob.mx/index.php?id=95

Commanders
- Commander-in-chief: President Claudia Sheinbaum
- Secretary of National Defense: General Ricardo Trevilla Trejo
- Commander: General Román Carmona Landa

Insignia
- Roundel

- Fin flash

Aircraft flown
- Attack: MD 500, T-6C+
- Electronic warfare: Embraer R-99
- Fighter: Northrop F-5F
- Helicopter: Mil Mi-8, Mil Mi-17, EC-725, UH-60, MD 500
- Interceptor: Northrop F-5E
- Reconnaissance: C-90A King Air, Sabreliner 75A, Fairchild C-26
- Trainer: Pilatus PC-7, T-6C+
- Transport: C-130, CASA C-295, Leonardo C-27J Spartan

The Mexican Air Force (FAM; Spanish: Fuerza Aérea Mexicana) is the air service branch under the Mexican Army of the Mexican Armed Forces. It is overseen by the Secretariat of National Defense. The objective of the FAM is to defend the integrity, independence, and sovereignty of Mexico. Its auxiliary tasks include internal security, assisting with public works, and natural disaster management. As of 2024, its commander is Óscar René Rubio Sánchez.

== History ==
=== Mexican Revolution ===
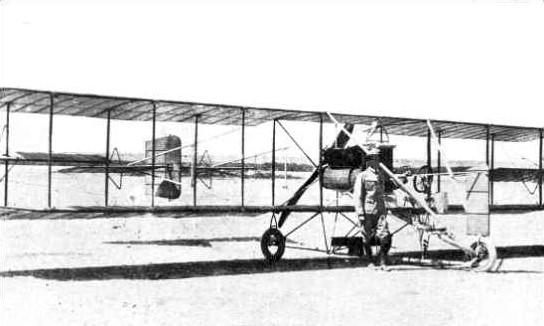
The Curtiss aircraft Sonora was used for observation and bombing. Mexico, 1913.

The foundation of the Mexican Air Force was led by five Mexican flight pioneers who were sent to New York by President Francisco Madero to master flying: Juan Pablo and Eduardo Aldasoro, Alberto and Gustavo Salinas and Horacio Ruiz. They returned to Mexico in 1913 not only as pioneers, but also teachers for the next generation of pilots.

The official predecessor of the Air Force was the Army's Auxiliary Aerial Militia Squadron (Escuadrilla Aérea de la Milicia Auxiliar del Ejército), created during the Mexican Revolution in April 1913 by the Secretary of War and Navy General Manuel Mondragón, who authorized pilots Miguel Lebrija and Juan Guillermo Villasana to test out bomb targets on Campo de Balbuena, the first airport in Mexico, now located in Jardín Balbuena in Mexico City.

The air force exclusively performed reconnaissance missions until 10 May 1913, when Didier Masson and a Joaquín Bauche Alcalde dropped 15 kilograms of dynamite on rebel boats. Although the attack did not cause any damage below, it is the first known instance of air-to-sea bombing. Masson also performed leaflet drops, also considered the first ever done.

On February 5, 1915, the leader of the Constitutionalist Army, Venustiano Carranza, founded the Military Aviation Arm (Arma de Aviación Militar), which would become the current air force. Its first commander was Lt. Alberto Salinas Carranza.

=== Other rebellions ===
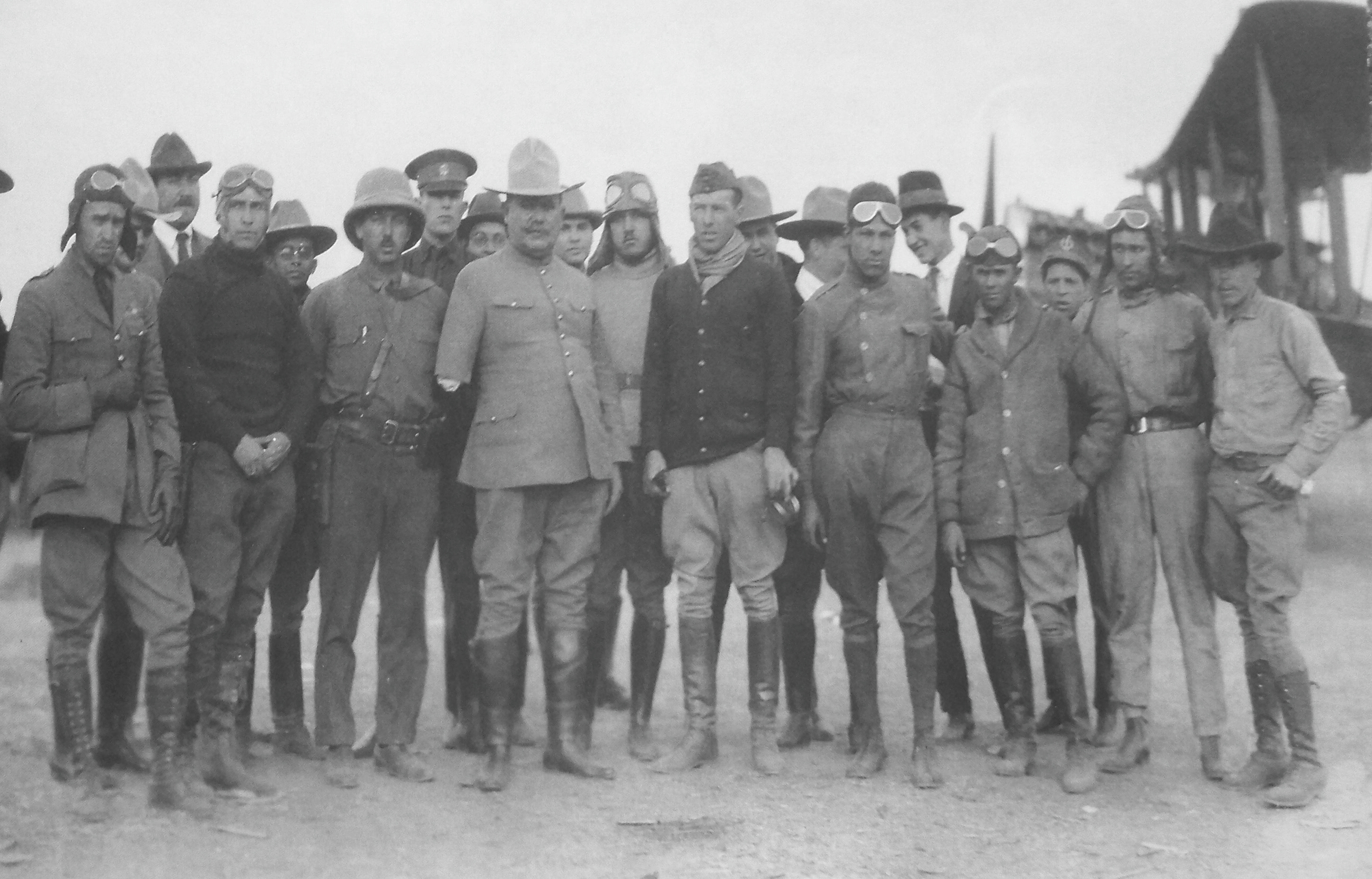
General O'Neill Standing with President Obregon

When WWI Ace U.S. Colonel Ralph O'Neill was hired to head the restructuring of the Mexican Air Force in 1920, he reported to General Plutarco Elías Calles that most of the aircraft available had to be replaced. Until August 1920, the entire fleet consisted of 13 national made prototypes of mixed engine design. These were functional yet ill-equipped for battle, 4 being scout monoplanes. 5 others were in repair and over 20 more at the TNCA were obsolete or wrecked beyond repair. The branch initially consisted of 27 pilots, 17 of which were cadets. In anticipation of the new "Chief", a purchase was made of 13 French Farman F.50 night bombers. Commander O'Neill soon acquired 35 British made Avro 504K and Avro 504J airplanes, which later would be made in Mexico under the name Avro Anáhuac. O'Neill was the first to introduce the term "Fuerza Aérea Mexicana" (FAM) naming the organization as such. The next step was the formation of classified fighter, bombing, observation and reconnaissance squadrons, as well as the decentralization of Air Force units throughout the country at strategic bases. O'Neill then set to work with his co-instructors German Fritz Bieler and Frenchman Joe Ben Lievre, using the first intercom known as the "Gosport System", invented by Robert Smith-Barry, in order to give in-air commands. O'Neill not only implemented new combat strategy, but also flew many decisive missions.

From 1923 to 1929, Mexico was immersed in a wave of violent territorial, religious and military armed rebellions, which required the new Air Force to quickly deploy support wherever the federal army requested them. These conflicts were resolved mostly by the assertive use of air superiority alone.

On December 7, 1923, former President Adolfo de la Huerta launched a military coup (delahuertista rebellion) against the government of President Álvaro Obregón. The situation was extremely critical, because along with de la Huerta, about 60% of the army revolted, including various high-ranking generals across the country. The power tilted back in favor of the federal forces when the United States agreed to furnish the Mexican government with a fleet of new de Havilland DH-4B aircraft equipped with the Liberty motor, armed with Lewis and Vickers machine guns and able to carry bombs. The military coup was suffocated by February 1924.

In 1925, due to the shortage of airplanes caused by World War I, Mexico set up the National Aviation Workshops (TNCA) to design and build its own airplanes and aeroengines.

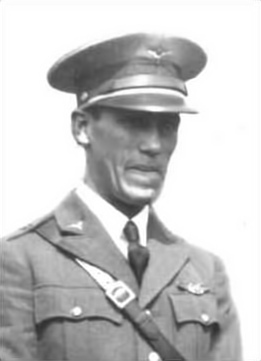
Emilio Carranza.

A territorial war was that of the Sonora Yaqui Indians who demanded by force that previous territorial treaties were implemented. The conflict lasted from 1926 to 1927, and it came to an end when a new treaty was implemented.

When President Plutarco Elías Calles pushed for the creation of the 'Mexican Apostolic Catholic Church', independent of Rome, it unleashed a widespread religious war known as the Cristero War. This long civil war lasted from 1926 to 1929.

In May 1927, while General Obregón seemed keen to impose the presidency to General Calles, General Arnulfo R. Gómez launched a military coup against both Obregón and Calles. His command posts were located in the cities of Puebla and Veracruz, where he led approximately 200 federal deserters, ammunition and weapons. The air force played a key role in their defeat.

Then, on March 3, 1929, a serious military coup took place, led by General José Gonzalo Escobar and heeded by various other generals. In these days, the air force's remaining airplanes consisted of worn and shot Bristol F.2 Fighter, Bristol Boarhound, de Havilland DH-4B and Douglas O-2C, a force that was not suitable to defeat Escobar's power. In this context, the Mexican government convinced the U.S. government to promote the peace south of its border and quickly make available twelve new OU-2M Corsair with the 400 hp Wasp engine, nine Douglas O-2M, four Stearman C3B and six Waco Taper Wings. Only two weeks after making the request, the U.S. government agreed, and several Mexican pilots travelled to Brownsville, Texas, and New York to pick up the new aircraft. The key victory was decided in late March 1929 at the Battle of Jiménez, Chihuahua, where after several days of air raids, Escobar was defeated by General Calles, taking about 6000 prisoners. This rebellion was quite serious, since a third of the officials and nearly 30,000 soldiers rebelled; in two months, more than 2000 men had been killed.

In May 1938, the Governor of San Luis Potosí, General Saturnino Cedillo, declared himself in rebellion and President Lázaro Cárdenas travelled there to personally mount the campaign against the revolt. The Air Force organized a mixed fleet of 17 aircraft that included some new V-99M Corsair, engaging the enemy assertively when spotted. Cedillo quickly realized he had no chance in open fields against the air force and ran to the Huasteca Hills, where his men dispersed, abandoning him.

With the imminent collapse of the Spanish Republic in 1939, the Mexican government took delivery of military aircraft destined for the Republic, strengthening its arsenal.

=== World War II ===
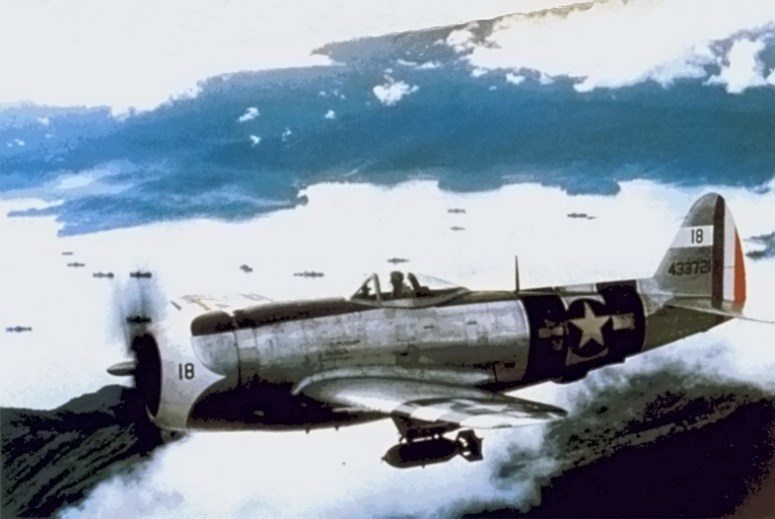
Mexican P-47D Thunderbolt over the Philippines (1945)

The Escuadrón 201, a P-47D fighter squadron of the Fuerza Aérea Expedicionaria Mexicana (Mexican Expeditionary Air Force), served in the Pacific War against the Empire of Japan during World War II. It consisted of 25 aircraft and had 300 airmen and supporting staff. The squadron completed 96 combat missions over the Philippines (Battle of Luzon) and Formosa (Taiwan). It is the only unit of the Mexican armed forces ever to see overseas combat.

=== Cold War era ===
The first jet aircraft operated by the Mexican Air Force was the subsonic de Havilland Vampire Mk.I. Mexico received 17 Vampires during late 1960 and early 1961. This jet was nicknamed "The Flying Avocado" by Mexican flight crews due to the ovoid shape of its fuselage and the dark green night camouflage adopted by its first units. The Vampires were not popular with Mexican fighter pilots because of its lack of ejection seats. The FAM finally retired them in 1970.

The Mexican Vampires were initially complemented by 15 Lockheed T-33 Shooting Star subsonic fighter aircraft received also in late 1961. Because of its more modern design, an ejection seat system and several other attributes, the T-33 was well liked by most FAM pilots and became a huge success as a patrol and interceptor aircraft. During the seventies and early eighties an additional 20 or more T-33s were procured by the FAM to replace aircraft lost in accidents and to increase the size of the fleet after the retirement of the Vampires.

In 1982, the FAM received 12 Northrop F-5E/F Tiger II jets (10 F-5Es and 2 F-5Fs). The F-5 gave Mexico its first supersonic platform and saw the formation of Air Squadron 401. Since the 1980s the F-5 became the main Mexican fighter jet while the remaining operational T-33s were used for subsonic support and light attack roles.

In 1983 one F-5E was lost in an accident that occurred during a target practice exercise in the state of Chihuahua.

=== Chiapas conflict ===
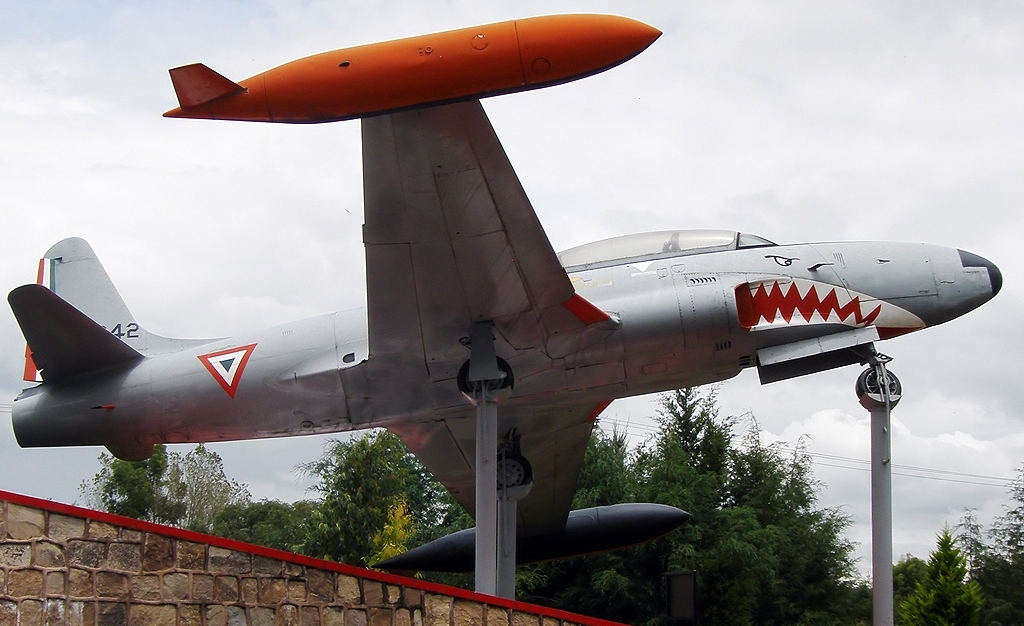
T-33A of the Mexican Air Force on display at Santa Lucía

On January 1, 1994, the day the North American Free Trade Agreement (NAFTA) came into effect, hundreds of guerrillas from the previously unknown Zapatista Army of National Liberation (EZLN) occupied several towns and cities in the southern state of Chiapas.

The FAM was mobilized to support Army units, sending almost every available helicopter to the territory of operations. Units involved included the recently formed 214th and 215th Special Operations Squadrons, equipped with a mix of Bell 212 assault- and MD.530F scout helicopters. Up to 40 helicopters were deployed to support an initial deployment of 10,000 ground troops.

Bell 212s were armed in two configurations: for fire support with twin MAG 7.62-mm gun pods and cabin-mounted GPMGs; or as gunship, with LAU-32 70-mm rocket launchers, a twin MAG gun-pod and cabin mounted MAG GPMGs.

Pumas, Bell 205s, 206s and 212s from the 209th were also deployed, however, FAM's helicopter assets were scarce and the Mexican Army had to rely on almost every other government agency's helicopters for general support tasks. Almost any flyable aircraft from the National Attorney's Office (PGR) was also deployed, including Bell 206s and 212s, as well as the Navy's recently acquired Mi-8MTV-1s. Eventually the Army deployed some 70,000 ground troops and air support proved to be insufficient; hence the decision was taken to considerably expand the FAM's helicopter fleet.

By December 1994, FAM had bought additional 12 armed MD.530MG 'Defender' and four UH-60L Blackhawk helicopters, which it grouped into the 216th Special Operations Squadron. This unit was the spearhead of operation "Arco Iris" (Rainbow) to re-take several towns that had fallen under rebel control in January 1994. The new militarized Defenders came armed with M2AC machine-guns and LAU-68A 70-mm rocket launchers. Three additional units were ordered in 1996 and delivered as attrition replacements in March 1998. Black Hawks wore 1191 to 1194 serials and are being used for special operations.

Although the FAM received 18 surplus Bell 206s from the Attorney General's office (PGR) in the mid-1990s, the main need identified by the FAM High Command was for a new fleet of transport helicopters that would allow it to support the Army with an adequate airlift capability.

=== Recent times ===
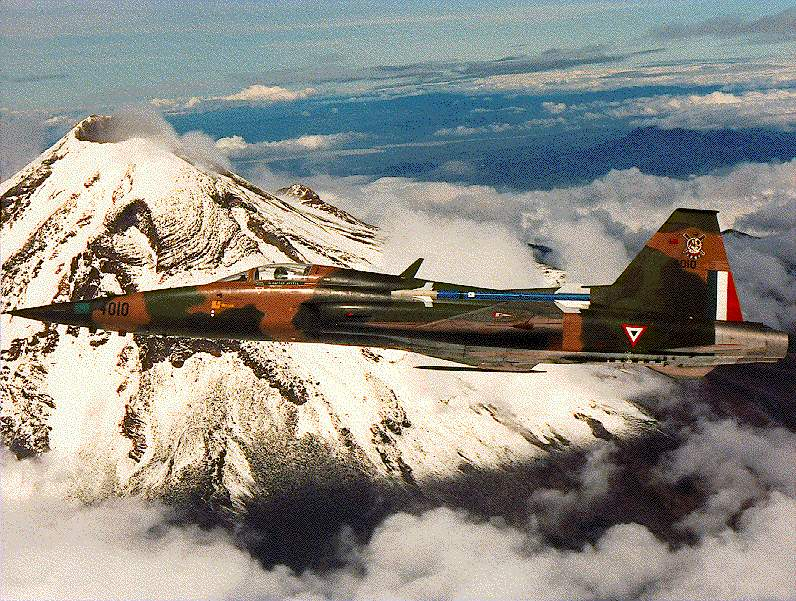
Mexican Air Force F-5 Tiger II flying near the Popocatépetl Volcano

After more than 30 yearly military parade flights without incidents, an F-5E collided in mid-air with three Lockheed T-33s on the Air-military parade accident on September 16, 1995. All aircraft were lost and a total of 10 deaths occurred. Since then, for safety reasons, military parade flyovers in Mexico have been smaller in participation.

In 2004, the Mexican Air Force recorded a UFO sighting over southern Campeche.

In 2007, after more than 45 years in service, the last operational T-33s were retired. In 2012, the supersonic F-5 fighter jets had their 30th anniversary in Mexican Air Force service. Due to high operating costs, lack of parts, and the extreme age of the aircraft, the Mexican Air Force retired all but three F-5s in late 2017. In early 2019, the Mexican Air Force received repaired engines for their F-5 fighters, as part of an effort to return a handful of the aircraft to operational status. In early 2023, restoration work on F-5 airframes has begun with the intention to have a total of at least nine F-5s in active service.

Because of the ongoing Mexican drug war, increasing importance has been placed on acquiring airborne surveillance platforms, UAVs, light attack aircraft, helicopters and rapid troop transports.

On 21 February 2021, a Learjet 45XR operated by the Mexican Air Force crashed while taking off from El Lencero Airport in Veracruz, killing all six people on board.

During the 2026 Tulum Air Show, General Román Carmona Landa told Janes Information Services via translator in a 25th of April interview, that the force was looking to procure 12 new fighters by 2028. General Carmona explained at the Tulum Air Show 2026, “the F-5 constitutes Mexico's highest capability, but it's an older technology and we are planning their replacement in the short to medium term. We are considering different options such as the General Dynamics F-16 Fighting Falcon or Saab JAS 39 Gripen and even ... in the light combat aircraft category, with the FA-50 Fighting Eagle from South Korea and the Alenia Aermacchi M-346 Master from Italy. Gen Carmona said the FAM is specifically “looking for an aircraft that can provide air defence as well as reconnaissance and ground attack duties”.

== Territorial organization ==
=== Air Force Regions ===
Air Force Regions (Spanish: Región Aérea) are the airspaces over one or more contiguous Zones or federal entities. In each Air Region, the Air Force provides security and defense, and address internal security matters in coordination with other Armed Forces or any federal institution. Each Air Region is composed of Headquarters, Air Force Bases, Air Force Stations, and other organizations. The Air Force divides the country's territory into four regions: Northwestern (Mexicali, Baja California), Northeastern (Chihuahua, Chihuahua), Central (Mexico City) and Southeastern (Tuxtla Gutiérrez, Chiapas); each region is commanded by a general. The regional headquarters are in charge of 18 air bases across the country:

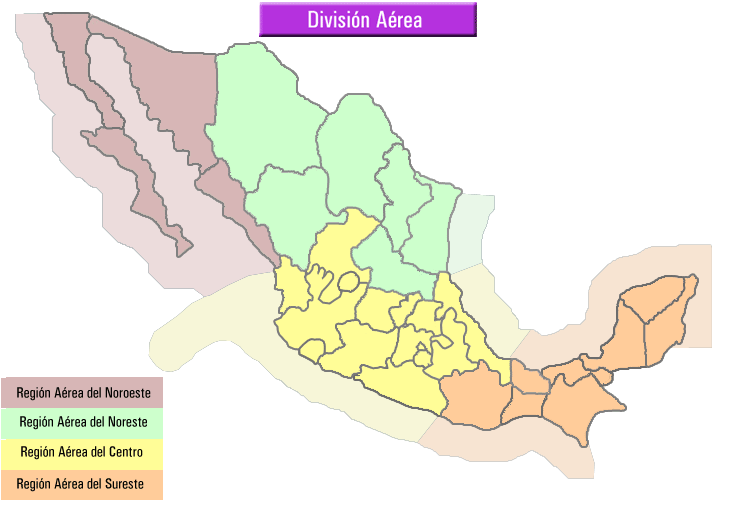
Mexican Air Force Regions

== Air Force Bases ==
Air Force Bases, also called Military Air Bases (Spanish: Base Aérea Militar) (BAM), are operational and administrative entities subordinate to the Air Regions, responsible for the technical and administrative aspects, as well as the coordination of aerial operations within the Air Regions. They comprise flight units and service organizations, overseeing the airspace assigned by the Air Force Command. The primary purpose of Air Bases is to conduct and support military aerial operations, ensuring the security and defense of the designated airspace, and contributing to internal security in accordance with directives from the Zone, Air Region, Air Force Command, and Ministry of Defense. The Mexican Air Force comprises 20 Air Force Bases, each associated with a specific Air Region in the country. Components of Air Bases include Headquarters, Flight Units, Technical Services of the Air Force, and Technical and Administrative Services.

Air Force Base	Location	State	Region	Official name	Air Group	Unit	Aircraft
Air Force Base (AFB) No. 1	Santa Lucía	State of Mexico	C	BAM N.º 1 Gral. Div. P.A. Alfredo Lezama Álvarez	1st	101 Air Squadron^{a}	Bell 412, Eurocopter EC725, UH-60 Black Hawk
Air Force Base (AFB) No. 1	Santa Lucía	State of Mexico	C	BAM N.º 1 Gral. Div. P.A. Alfredo Lezama Álvarez	1st	112 Air Squadron	Bell 212, MD 530MG
Air Force Base (AFB) No. 1	Santa Lucía	State of Mexico	C	BAM N.º 1 Gral. Div. P.A. Alfredo Lezama Álvarez	3rd	301 Air Squadron	C-295, IAI 101B/102/201
Air Force Base (AFB) No. 1	Santa Lucía	State of Mexico	C	BAM N.º 1 Gral. Div. P.A. Alfredo Lezama Álvarez	3rd	302 Air Squadron	C-27J Spartan, C-130 Hercules
Air Force Base (AFB) No. 1	Santa Lucía	State of Mexico	C	BAM N.º 1 Gral. Div. P.A. Alfredo Lezama Álvarez	3rd	303 Air Squadron	Mi-8T/MTV-1
Air Force Base (AFB) No. 1	Santa Lucía	State of Mexico	C	BAM N.º 1 Gral. Div. P.A. Alfredo Lezama Álvarez	3rd	Aerial Surveillance Squadron	C-26 Metroliner, R/P-99, SA2-37B
Air Force Base (AFB) No. 1	Santa Lucía	State of Mexico	C	BAM N.º 1 Gral. Div. P.A. Alfredo Lezama Álvarez	3rd	VIP Transport Squadron	Boeing 757, Super Puma
AFB No. 2	Ixtepec	Oaxaca	SW	BAM N.º 2 General Div. P.A. Antonio Cárdenas Rodríguez	1st	401 Air Squadron	F-5E/F
AFB No. 2	Ixtepec	Oaxaca	SW	BAM N.º 2 General Div. P.A. Antonio Cárdenas Rodríguez	1st	402 Air Squadron	PC-7
AFB No. 3	Ensenada	Baja California	NW	BAM N.º 3 General Div. P.A. Alberto Leopoldo Salinas Carranza	5th	106 Air Squadron	Cessna 182, Cessna 206
AFB No. 4	Cozumel	Quintana Roo	SE	BAM N.º 4 General Brig. P.A. Eduardo Aldasoro Suárez	2nd	201 Air Squadron	T-6C+
AFB No. 5	Zapopan	Jalisco	C	BAM N.º 5 Captain P.A. Emilio Carranza Rodríguez	5th	105 Air Squadron	Cessna 182, Cessna 206
AFB No. 5	Zapopan	Jalisco	C	BAM N.º 5 Captain P.A. Emilio Carranza Rodríguez	5th	111 Air Squadron	Bell 206, Bell 212
AFB No. 5	Zapopan	Jalisco	C	BAM N.º 5 Captain P.A. Emilio Carranza Rodríguez	Air Force Academy	Preparatory Squadron	Beech F33C
AFB No. 5	Zapopan	Jalisco	C	BAM N.º 5 Captain P.A. Emilio Carranza Rodríguez	Air Force Academy	Primary Squadron	Aermacchi SF.260
AFB No. 5	Zapopan	Jalisco	C	BAM N.º 5 Captain P.A. Emilio Carranza Rodríguez	Air Force Academy	Advanced Squadron	Pilatus PC-7
AFB No. 6	Tuxtla Gutiérrez	Chiapas	SE	BAM N.º 6 General Ala P.A. Ángel Hipólito Corzo Molina	2nd	202 Air Squadron	PC-7, PC-9M
AFB No. 7	Acapulco	Guerrero	C	BAM N.º 7 General Div. P.A. Gustavo León González	2nd	204 Air Squadron	PC-7
AFB No. 7	Acapulco	Guerrero	C	BAM N.º 7 General Div. P.A. Gustavo León González	5th	102 Air Squadron	Bell 206, Bell 212
AFB No. 8	Mérida	Yucatán	SE	BAM N.º 8 General Div. P.A. Roberto Fierro Villalobos	5th	104 Air Squadron	Bell 206, Bell 212, CH-53D Yas'ur, Cessna 210
AFB No. 9	La Paz	Baja California Sur	NW	BAM N.º 9 General Div. P.A. Gustavo Adolfo Salinas Camiña	2nd	203 Air Squadron	PC-7
AFB No. 10	Culiacán	Sinaloa	NW	BAM N.º 10 General Brig. P.A. Radamés Gaxiola Andrade	4th	Maintenance Center	Bell 206, Cessna 206
AFB No. 10	Culiacán	Sinaloa	NW	BAM N.º 10 General Brig. P.A. Radamés Gaxiola Andrade	5th	109 Air Squadron	Cessna 182
AFB No. 11	Santa Gertrudis	Chihuahua	NE	BAM N.º 11 Lieutenant Colonel P.A. Juan Pablo Aldasoro Suárez		Air Force Air Tactics Military School (EMAATFA)	PC-7
AFB No. 12	Tijuana	Baja California	NW	BAM N.º 12 Lieutenant Colonel P.A. Horacio Ruiz Gaviño	no flying units assigned		
AFB No. 13	Chihuahua	Chihuahua	NE	BAM N.º 13 Colonel P.A. Pablo L. Sidar	5th	110 Air Squadron	Cessna 182
AFB No. 14	Apodaca	Nuevo León	NE	BAM N.º 14 General Div. Ing. Artca. Juan Francisco Azcárate Pino	4th	102 Air Squadron	Bell 206, Bell 212
AFB No. 14	Apodaca	Nuevo León	NE	BAM N.º 14 General Div. Ing. Artca. Juan Francisco Azcárate Pino	5th	108 Air Squadron	Cessna 182, Cessna 206
AFB No. 15	Oaxaca	Oaxaca	SE	BAM N.º 15 General Div. P.A. Alfonso Cruz Rivera	5th	103 Air Squadron	Bell 212
AFB No. 16	Ciudad Pemex	Tabasco	SE	BAM N.º 16 General Div. P.A. Alberto Hipólito Vieytes y Vieytes		109 Air Squadron	Cessna 182'
AFB No. 17	Comitán	Chiapas	SE	BAM N.º 17 General Div. P.A. Luís Farell Cubillas		113 Air Squadron	UH-60 Black Hawk
AFB No. 18	Hermosillo	Sonora	NW	BAM N.º 18 General Div. P.A. D.E.M.A. Roberto Salido Beltrán	3rd	3rd Aerial Surveillance Squadron	C-26 Metroliner, Pilatus PC-6, Embraer R/P-99
AFB No. 18	Hermosillo	Sonora	NW	BAM N.º 18 General Div. P.A. D.E.M.A. Roberto Salido Beltrán	5th	107 Air Squadron	Cessna 182, Pilatus PC-6
AFB No.19	Mexico City	Mexico City	C	BAM N.º 19 General Ala P.A. D.E.M.A. Fernando Hernández Vega		General Coordination of the Presidential Air Transport Unit (CGTAP)	
AFB No.19	Mexico City	Mexico City	C	BAM N.º 19 General Ala P.A. D.E.M.A. Fernando Hernández Vega		High Command Special Air Transport Unit (UETAAM)	Boeing 737, IAI 201, JetStar, King Air, SA 330J, UH-60 Black Hawk
AFB No.20	Tulum	Quintana Roo	SE	BAM N.º 20 General Brig. P.A. Samuel Carlos Rojas Rasso	N/A		

Notes:
^{a}: Mexico received two of the twelve EC-725; the first two are assigned to the 101 Air Squadron.

=== Air Force Stations ===
Air Force Stations, also called Military Air Stations (Spanish: Estación Aérea Militar) (EAM), are command and control units subordinate to Air Regions, designed to support military air operations. Typically situated within civilian airport facilities, these stations serve to direct, coordinate, and provide logistical support for military air operations occurring within, from, or to their installation. These stations are exclusively integrated with service organizations, catering to the requirements of military air operations and addressing their own living and operational necessities. They may have assigned crews and aircraft in support or transit, over which they exert technical, administrative, and disciplinary control for the duration of their stay.

Air Force Station	Location	State	Official Name	Adjacent Civil Airport
Air Force Station (AFS) No. 1	Guadalajara	Jalisco	Estación Aérea Militar N.º 1	Guadalajara International Airport
AFS No. 2	Guerrero Negro (San Quintín Municipality)	Baja California	Estación Aérea Militar N.º 2	Guerrero Negro Airport
AFS No. 3	Torreón	Coahuila	Estación Aérea Militar N.º 3	Torreón International Airport
AFS No. 4	Tampico	Tamaulipas	Estación Aérea Militar N.º 4	Tampico International Airport
AFS No. 5	Puerto Vallarta	Jalisco	Estación Aérea Militar N.º 5	Puerto Vallarta International Airport
AFS No. 6	Irapuato	Guanajuato	Estación Aérea Militar N.º 6	-
AFS No. 7	Minatitlán	Veracruz	Estación Aérea Militar N.º 7	Minatitlán International Airport
AFS No. 8	Loma Bonita	Oaxaca	Estación Aérea Militar N.º 8	-
AFS No. 9	Atlangatepec	Tlaxcala	Estación Aérea Militar N.º 9	-
AFS No. 10	Agualeguas	Nuevo León	Estación Aérea Militar N.º 10	-

=== Map of Mexican Air Force facilities ===
Mexican Air Force Facilities
Red = Air Force Base
Green = Air Force Station

== Organization ==
=== Ranks ===
Air Force ranks are the same as in Mexico's Army, with the exception of generals. A national commander under the orders of the Secretary of National Defense is in charge of the Mexican Air Force. The second-in-command is the Air Force Chief of Staff, who supervises a Deputy Chief of Operations and a Deputy Chief of Management.

Officer ranks

Rank group	General / flag officers			Senior officers			Junior officers
Mexican Air Force
Mexican Air Force	General de división	General de ala	General de grupo	Coronel	Teniente coronel	Mayor	Capitan primero	Capitán segundo	Teniente	Subteniente

Other ranks

Rank group	Senior NCOs		Junior NCOs	Enlisted
Mexican Air Force
Mexican Air Force	Sargento primero	Sargento segundo	Cabo	Soldado

=== Pilot selection and training ===
The FAM offers higher education, middle education, technical training, tactical training and specialized technical training in its various campuses:

==== Air Force Academy ====
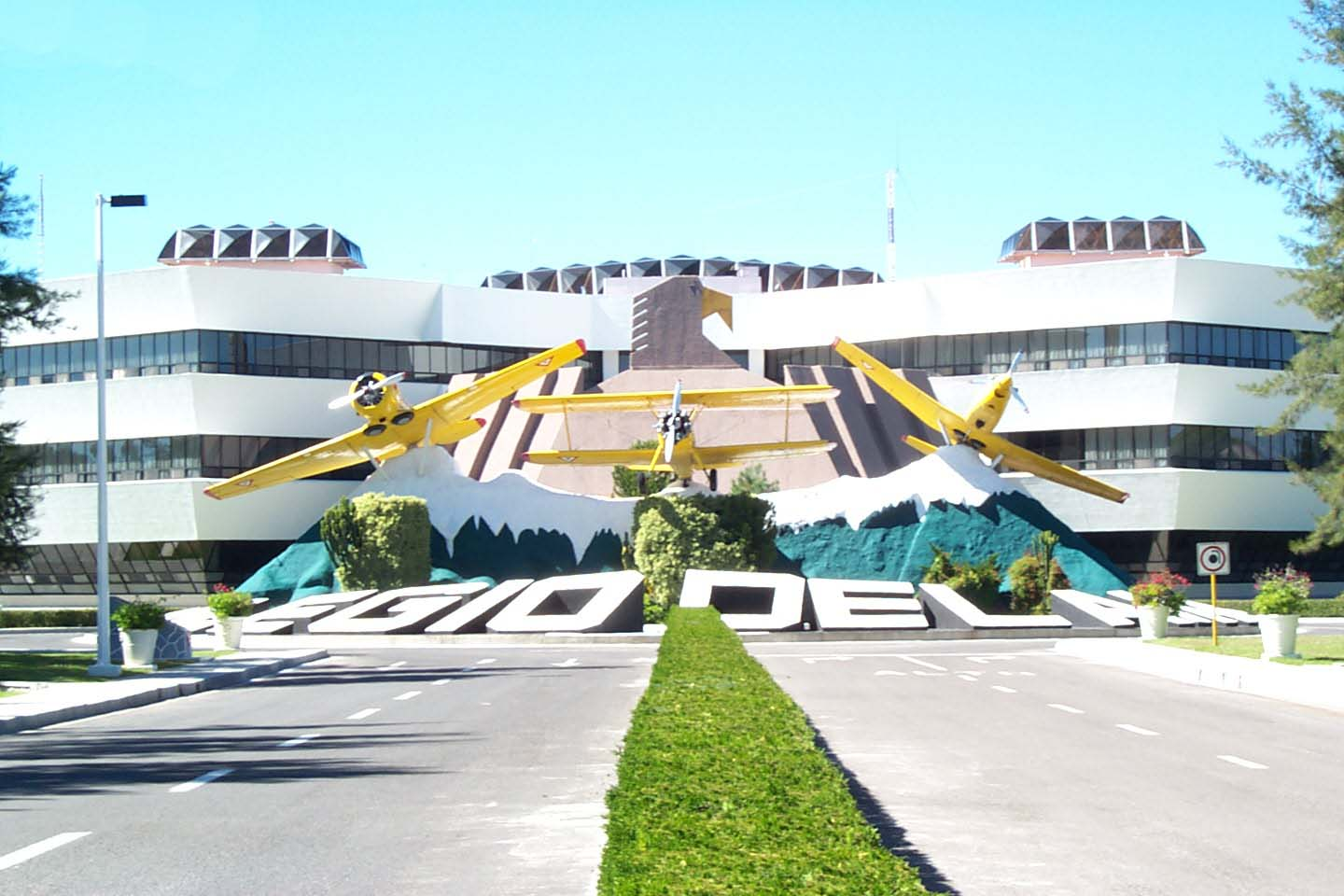
Facade of the Air Force Academy

Since the National School of Aviation was opened in 1915, it took different names over the years until finally, in 1959 it joined the military school of meteorology, mechanics and aviation specialists, forming the leading campus in military aviation education: 'El Colegio del Aire' (Air Force Academy), which since September 9, 1959, has guided the formation of Air Force officers. The Air Force Academy is an all academic institution of the Mexican Air Force and comprises four schools: 'Military Aviation School', 'Maintenance and Supply Military School', 'Air Force Military Specialist School', and the 'Military Troops' Air Force Specialist School'.

==== Military Aviation School (EMA) ====
Admission to the Air Force is through the mechanism of military recruitment that takes place every year at The Ministry of Defense. The FAM currently offers tertiary level studies – highlighting that of Military Pilot, which spans 4 years at the facilities of the Air Force Academy located on the Military Air Base No. 5 in Zapopan, Jalisco.

The subjects taught in pilot training include: tactics of the branches of aviation, general aviation tactics, meteorology, air navigation, air traffic control, radio communications and culture in general, along with approximately 250 hours of flight. During the first year, the training is theoretical. During the second year, Beechcraft Bonanza aircraft are used for flight instruction. During the third the cadets are trained Aermacchi SF260EU for aerobatics, and later on Pilatus PC-7 for advanced flight tactics, including combat. Within each of these stages, the cadets are trained in aerial acrobatics, stage tactical instrument flight, visual flying rules (VFR), radio operations, among others, which increase in complexity as the cadets' training progresses. The first female aviator to graduate as a pilot in the history of FAM, Andrea Cruz, became a cadet at the Military Aviation School in 2007.

==== Military Air Force Specialist School (EMEFA) ====
Military School of Air Force Specialist offers a comprehensive scholarship lasting three years for officer training meteorologists and flight control, obtaining at the graduate level of lieutenant. His duties are to provide meteorological information and control of military or civil aircraft.

==== School of the Air Force Specialists (EMEFA) ====
Military School of the Air Forces specialists is an establishment of military education that has as its mission to train sergeants in seconds aviation maintenance, supply lines, electronic aviation and military aviation. The school is located in the St. Lucía military base.

==== Military School of Maintenance and Supply (EMMA) ====
In this school, officers are trained as aviation maintenance specialists, aviation electronics specialists, weapons and air supply lines.

=== Recruitment ===
To enter any of the campuses of the Air Force, SEDENA convenes a competitive entrance examination which is held each year. The requirements are:

- Mexican citizenship and have no other nationality
- Be the son of Mexican born parents
- Minimum age of 15 years at December 31 of the year in course
- Maximum age of 20 years at December 31 of the year in course
- Have completed high school or equivalent
- Minimum height of 1.65 m (5’-5”)

In order to be admitted to any school of the Mexican Air Force Academy mentioned above, the applicant should also perform the following tests: physical, medical, cultural, and aviation psychology. In some cases, the psychological aeromedical 2nd level examination may also be required.

== Radar systems ==
=== Current inventory ===
Radar	Origin	Type	Notes
AN/TPS-78	United States	3D air-surveillance radar	Utitlized by the Mexican Air Force, and is found across multiple states.
TPS-Camazot 220	Mexico	3D air-surveillance radar	Utilized in the Colegio del Aire in Zapopan with a confirmed prototype.

== Aircraft ==
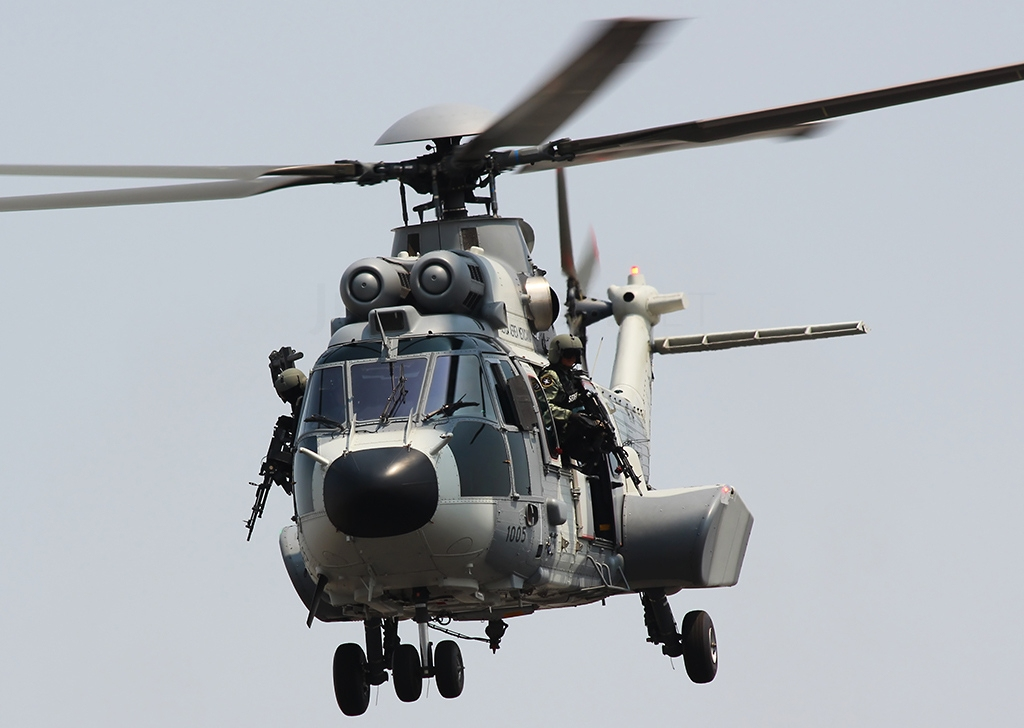
A Eurocopter EC225 at Mexico City International Airport

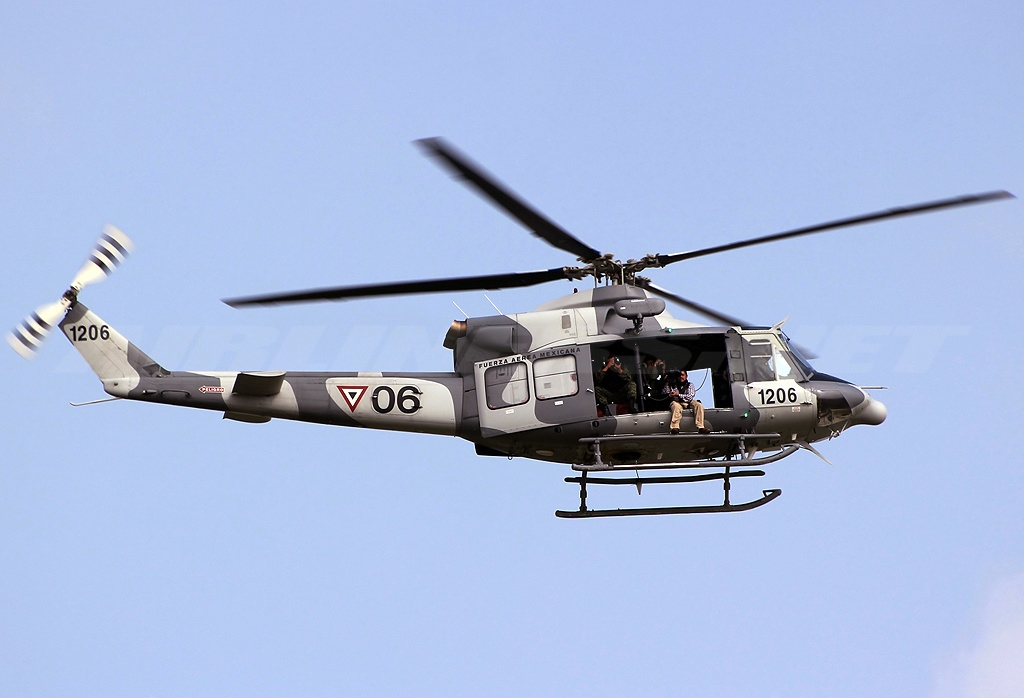
A Bell 412EP of the Mexican Air Force

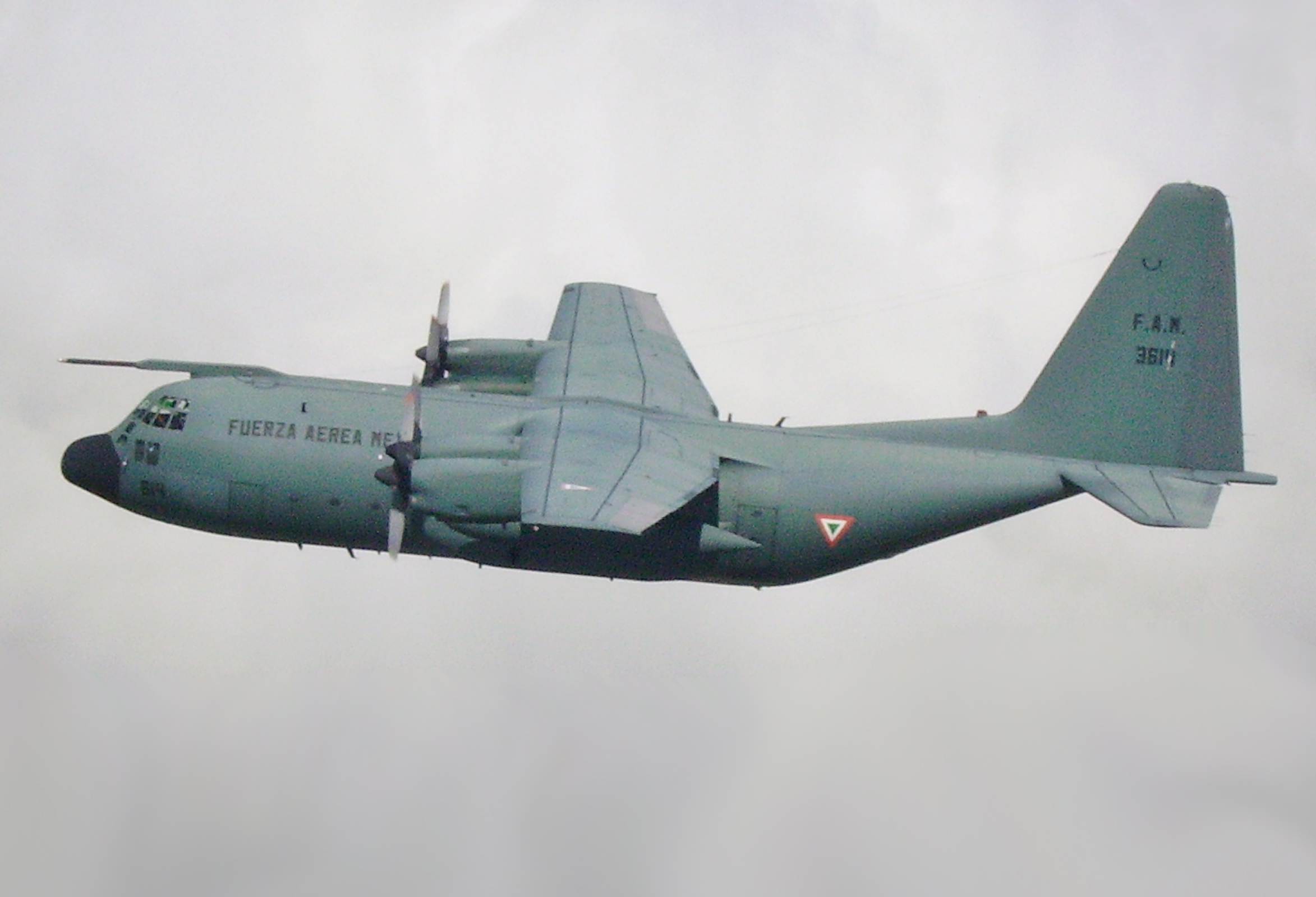
Fuerza Aerea Mexicana C-130

=== Current inventory ===
Aircraft	Origin	Type	Variant	In service	Notes
Combat aircraft
Northrop F-5	United States	Fighter	F-5E/F	3	2 F-5E and 1 F-5F. One used for training. The Mexican Air Force plans on acquiring 12 new fighter jets to replace aging F-5 jets.
AWACS
Embraer E-99	Brazil	AEW&C		3	Two used for maritime patrol
Reconnaissance
Beechcraft King Air	United States	Surveillance	350	2	
Cessna Citation I	United States	Surveillance		2	
Transport
Boeing 737	United States	VIP transport		3	
C-27J Spartan	Italy	Utility transport		4	
C-130 Hercules	United States	Transport	C-130E/K/L-100	3	
Lockheed Martin C-130J Super Hercules	United States	Transport	C-130J-30	2	
Super King Air	United States	Utility transport	90/300	3	
CASA C-295	Spain	SAR / Transport		5	1 lost in September 2025.
Pilatus PC-6	Switzerland	Transport / Utility		1	STOL capable aircraft
Turbo Commander	United States	Transport		2	
Helicopters
Bell 206	United States	Utility		22	9 used for rotorcraft training
Bell 407	United States	Utility		17	
Bell 412	United States	Utility		8	
Bell UH-1	United States	Utility	UH-1H	1	
Mil Mi-17	Russia	Utility	Mi-8/17	18	
Sikorsky UH-60	United States	Utility	UH-60M	20	7 on order
Eurocopter EC725	France	SAR / Utility		16	4 on order
MD 500 Defender	United States	Light attack	530F	13	
Trainer aircraft
Pilatus PC-7	Switzerland	Trainer		30	
Pilatus PC-9	Switzerland	Trainer		1	
Grob G 120TP	Germany	Basic trainer		24	1 lost in 2025
T-6 Texan II	United States	Advanced trainer	T-6C	56	
SIAI-Marchetti SF.260	Italy	Basic trainer		24	
UAV
Elbit Hermes 450	Israel	Surveillance		3	
Hydra Technologies Ehécatl	Mexico	Surveillance		10	

== See also ==
- Mexican Armed Forces
- Mexican Department of Defense
- Mexican Army
- Mexican Department of the Navy
- Mexican Navy
- Mexican Naval Aviation
- Mexican National Guard
- List of airports in Mexico

== Bibliography ==
- Hagedorn, Daniel P. (September–October 1996). "Talkback". Air Enthusiast (65): 80. ISSN 0143-5450.
