= 1995 Mexico City air show mid-air collision =

1995 mid-air collision

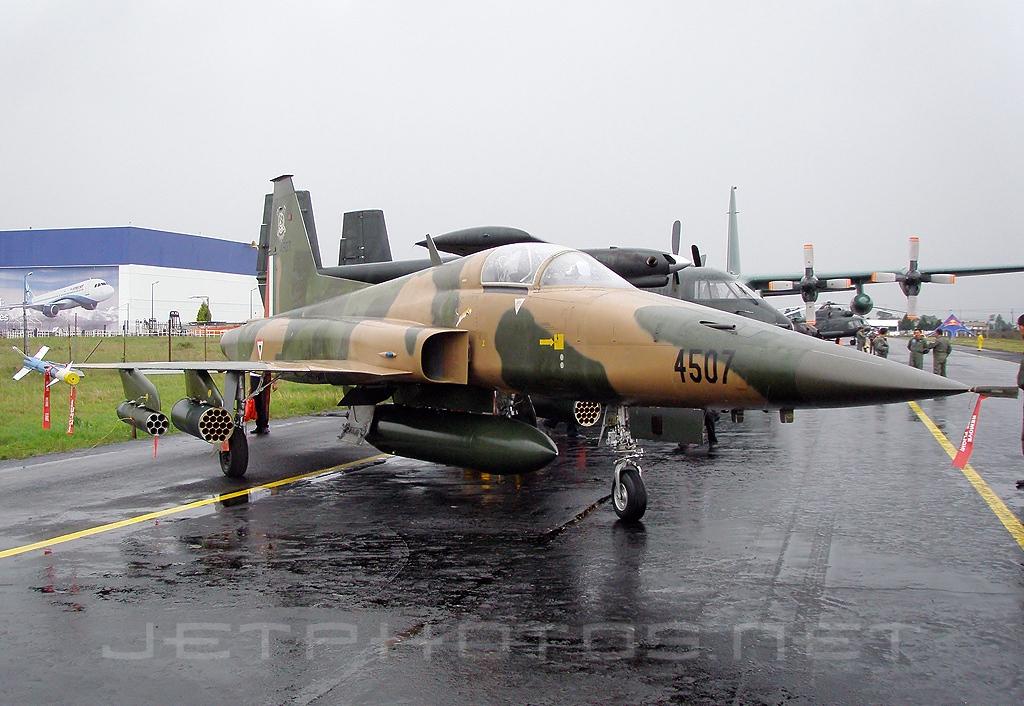
- Northrop F-5E Tiger II similar to one of those involved in the accident

Accident
- Date: 16 September 1995
- Summary: Mid-air collision of multiple aircraft
- Site: Mexico City
- Total fatalities: 6
- Total injuries: 1
- Total survivors: 3

Aircraft
- Aircraft type: 1× Light fighter; 4× Trainer
- Aircraft name: 1× Northrop F-5E Tiger II; 4× Lockheed T-33A Shooting Star
- Operator: Mexican Air Force
- Registration: 4003 (F-5); JE-009, JE-036, JE-049, JE-050 (T-33)
- Flight origin: Santa Lucia Air Force Base
- Destination: Santa Lucia Air Force Base
- Crew: 9
- Fatalities: 6
- Injuries: 1
- Survivors: 3

On 16 September 1995, five aircraft of the Mexican Air Force collided in mid-air during an air show display at a parade celebrating the 185th anniversary of the Mexican War of Independence. 6 of the 9 pilots involved died in the accident.

== Events ==
During the military parade to celebrate the 185th anniversary of the Mexican War of Independence, among other aircraft, squadrons of Northrop F-5s and Lockheed T-33s participated, flying in their respective formations. At 11:44 a.m., the Northrop F-5E with the registration 4003 piloted by Captain Héctor Ricardo Trejo Flores hit the Lockheed T-33 with the registration JE-050 in flight, which was piloted by General Gonzalo Curiel García and Lieutenant Gustavo Enrique Pérez Estrada. This impact generated a chain reaction that caused the successive collision against the Lockheed T-33 with the registration JE-036 piloted by Major José Rivera Gutiérrez and Lieutenant Gerardo Ceballos Peraza, the Lockheed T-33 with the registration JE-009 and the Lockheed T-33 with the registration JE-049, this one piloted by Lieutenant Mario Humberto Sánchez García and Lieutenant Jorge Vergara Mogollón.

JE-009 was lightly damaged and was able to return to the Santa Lucía Air Base with its crew unharmed, however, 4003, whose pilot ejected but did not survive, crashed in the Huixquilucan area. The rest of the aircraft crashed in Cuajimalpa, where only both pilots of JE-036 managed to eject, though one of them died.

Several factors were mentioned that could have caused the accident, from a route invasion by the T-33, flying at a lower altitude than ordered by the F-5 at the same time that the T-33 were flying above its corresponding altitude, and desynchronization during maneuvers.

=== General Gonzalo Curiel García ===
One of those killed in said accident, General Gonzalo Curiel, supposedly maintained friendly ties with the drug lord Amado Carrillo Fuentes, as he introduced his son as his nephew to allow him to board a FAM helicopter during the parade; additionally, the night before he had reportedly attended an event in Carillo's house. Curiel was also the director of public security of Guadalajara, a flight instructor of the Air College and the commander of the Military Air Base No. 4 of Cozumel, after which he became the commander of the Military Air Base No. 2 of Ixtepec, a position he held at the time of his death.

Currently, the Mascota Airport in the state of Jalisco bears his name.
