= Hydra Technologies =

Hydra Technologies of Mexico
- Type: Private
- Industry: Aerospace
- Headquarters: Mexico
- Products: Unmanned aerial vehicles
- Number of employees: 250 (2022)
- Website: http://www.hydra-technologies.com

Hydra Technologies is a Mexican firm dedicated to the design and development of unmanned aerial vehicles for surveillance operations and aircraft avionics. The company has one hundred employees and as of mid-2008 has two operational models, the S4 Ehécatl and the E1 Gavilán.

== Operations ==
The S4 Ehécatl and E1 Gavilán are used in Mexico for ecological supervision, civilian protection, surveillance and the war on drugs. The State of Jalisco uses them for detection of polluting sources in Río Grande de Santiago and for surveillance over Guadalajara in search for flooding-sensitive zones. They are also used by other countries.

== S4 Ehécatl ==
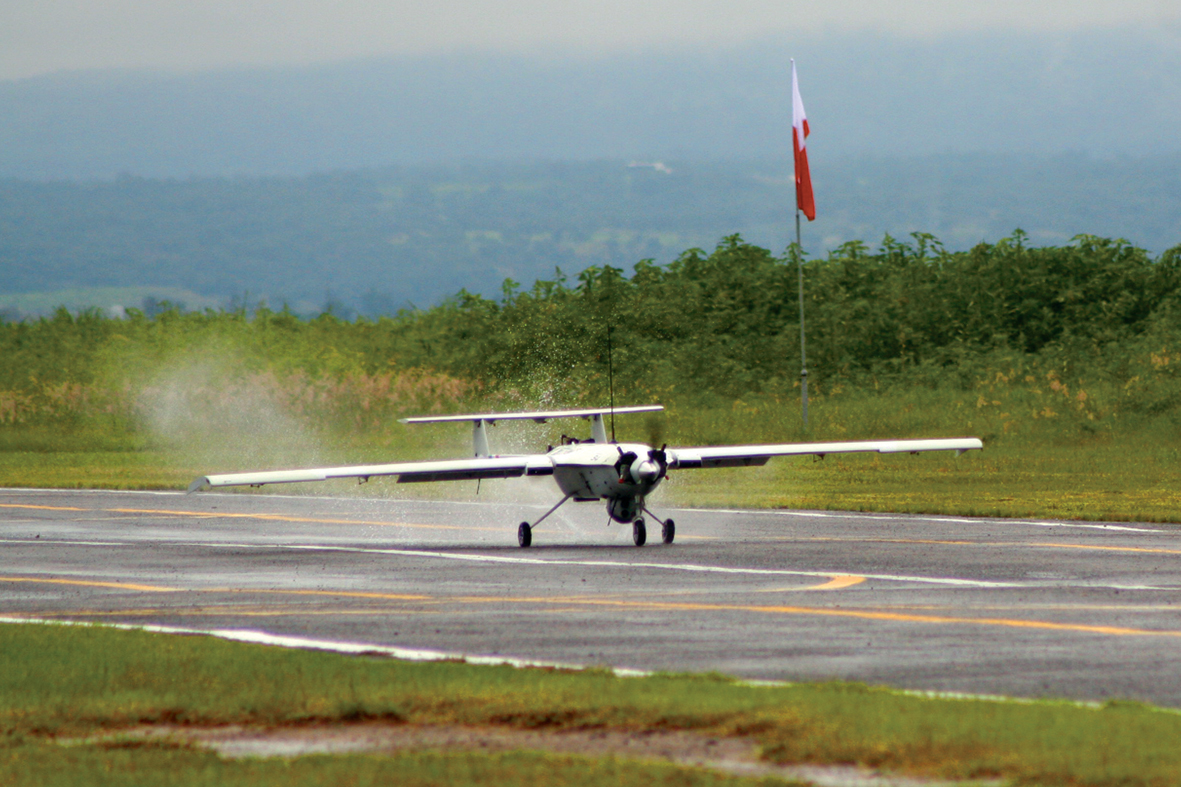
The S4 Ehécatl landing

Development of the Hydra Technologies Ehécatl began in 2002 as a joint effort between the Government of Mexico, the Financial Sector, and Mexican academic and scientific institutions. Its main function is to provide security and surveillance capabilities in support of the Armed Forces, as well as civilian protection in hazardous situations.

The S4 Ehécatl has a complex electronic system designed to provide up to eight hours of autonomous flight. It is controlled from a mobile central facility installed in a specially-equipped three-man ground vehicle. Apart from an American-made FLIR thermal video system, all of the craft's components are designed, developed and manufactured in-house.

== E1 Gavilán ==
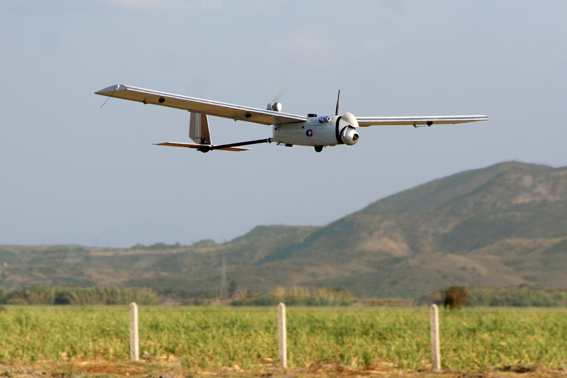
The E1 Gavilán in flight

The Hydra Technologies Gavilán is a miniature UAV with ninety minutes of flight autonomy, controlled by a single user through a portable GCS. As the S4 Ehécatl, the E1 Gavilán is the result of a joint effort of the institutions mentioned above and is also equipped with a FLIR thermal video system for nighttime operation. It was presented on June 10 in San Diego, California, in AUVSI's Unmanned Systems North America 2008, an important event for this particular industry. The european debut took place on July 14 of the same year at the Farnborough Airshow.

== In development ==
As of 2008, the company has other models in process of design, the S5 Cuculcán and the G1 Guerrero. The S5 Cuculcán will be able to fly for up to sixteen hours and provide a portable data recovery system, there is not much information on the G1 Guerrero yet.

== Awards ==
- Al Aube Outstanding Contributor Award for the development of the S4 Ehécatl by AUSVI (2007)
- Leonardo da Vinci Award for the development of the S4 Ehécatl and the D1 Gavilán by the International Aeronautics Congress of Mexico (2008)
- Special award by the Jalisco State Council of Science and Technology for its contribution to the Information, Microelectronics and Communication Industries in Mexico (2008)
