= UFO sightings in Mexico =

List of UFO sightings in the nation of Mexico

This is a list of alleged sightings of unidentified flying objects or UFOs in Mexico.

== 1883 ==
- On 12 August 1883, the astronomer José Bonilla reported that he saw "more than 300 dark, unidentified objects crossing before the Sun" while observing sunspot activity at Zacatecas Observatory in Mexico. He took a number of wet-plate photographs at 1/100-second exposure. Skeptical explanations have included high-flying geese or fragmented pieces of a comet. Bonilla is usually given the distinction of having taken the earliest photo of an "unidentified flying object", with some ufological literature interpreting the photographs as either alien spacecraft or an unsolved mystery.

== 1974 ==
- According to ufologists, local residents reported a mid-air collision between a UFO and a small airplane near the town of Coyame on 25 August 1974, followed by a military investigation and cover-up. However, historians say that such "UFO reports" were likely prompted by the 1974 crash and military recovery of a Cessna aircraft involved in drug trafficking.

== 2004 ==
- On 5 March, Mexican Air Force pilots using infrared equipment to search for drug-smuggling aircraft recorded 11 unidentified objects over southern Campeche. Mexico's Defense Department issued a press release on 12 May accompanied by videotape that showed bright moving lights at 11,500 feet (3,500 metres). Mexican ufologist Jaime Maussan interpreted the videotape as "proof of alien visitation", but science writer and skeptic Michael Shermer was critical of witness accounts that "varied wildly", saying, "it was like a fisherman's tale, growing with each retelling", while other experts suggested the lights were most likely burn-off flares on offshore oil platforms in the Gulf of Mexico.

== See also ==
- List of reported UFO sightings
