= Hydra Technologies Gavilán =

Gavilán
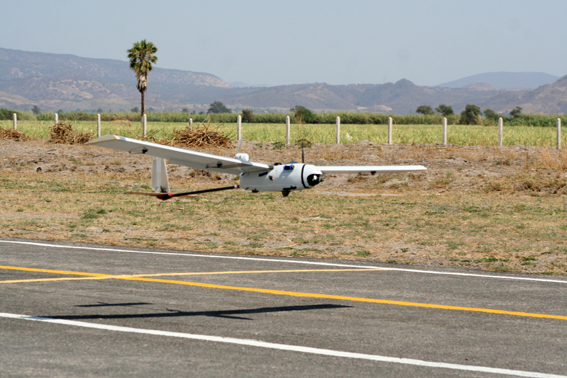

General information
- Type: Unmanned aerial vehicle
- Manufacturer: Hydra Technologies of Mexico
- Primary user: Secretariat of Public Security

History
- First flight: 2008

The E1 Gavilán ('Sparrowhawk' in English) is an unmanned electrical-surveillance airplane designed and manufactured by the Mexican firm Hydra Technologies. The aircraft is a remotely controlled unmanned aerial vehicle.

The Gavilán was unveiled on June 10 2008, at the Association for Unmanned Vehicle Systems International (AUVSI) North America 2008 event in San Diego, California. The airplane was also displayed at the Farnborough Airshow on July 14 2008.

== Description ==
The Gavilán is a multipurpose reusable unmanned aerial system for surveillance. It's faster and requires less space compared to the S4 Ehécatl.

The plane's main feature is that it does not rely on a runway for takeoff, making it easier to maneuver on uneven terrain by the help of manual control.

The aircraft has a 90-minutes flight autonomy, and is controlled by a single user by means of a portable Ground Control Station(GCS).

The system was developed by the Mexican Federal Government, Nafinsa and academic or scientific institutions such as CONACYT, Instituto Politécnico Nacional, Universidad Autónoma de Guadalajara and ITESO.

== Specifications ==
- Unmanned aerial vehicle (UAV)
- Weight: 5 kg
- Operation radio: 10 km
- Take-off mode: Catapult
- Payload: Interchangeable module equipped with mission sensor and flight camera
- Extension: 150 cm (1.5 m)
- Power source: Electric Battery
- Autonomous power: Electric Engine
- Flight autonomy: 90 minutes
- Operational Height: Around 8000 feet above sea level.

== Uses ==
- Mexico - The Mexican Secretariat of Public Security (Secretaría de Seguridad Pública, SSP).

== See also ==
- The S4 Ehécatl
- Hydra Technologies of Mexico

== Gallery ==
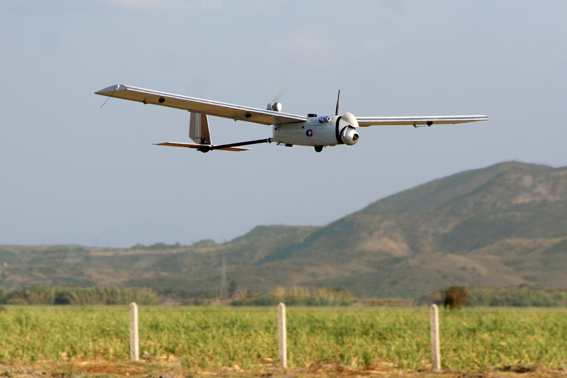
El E1 Gavilán in flight

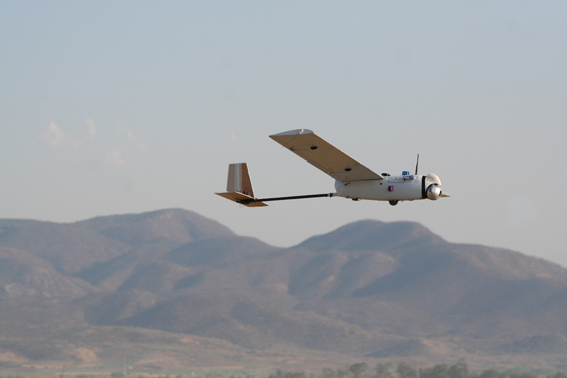
El E1 Gavilán in flight
