= Miguel Lebrija =

Mexican aviation pioneer

Miguel Lebrija Urtetegui
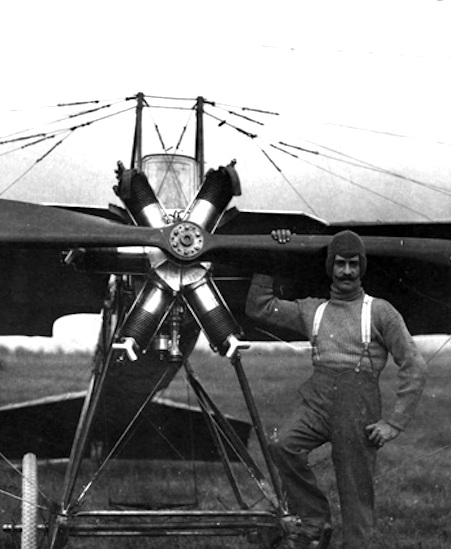
- Miguel Lebrija in front of his plane

Personal details
- Born: September 20, 1887 Mexico City
- Died: December 15, 1913 (aged 27)
- Education: Colegio Williams
- Occupation: aviator

Military service
- Allegiance: Mexico
- Branch/service: Mexican Army (Escuadrilla Aérea de la Milicia Auxiliar del Ejército)
- Rank: Honorary Major
- Battles/wars: Battle of Campo de Balbuena

Miguel Lebrija Urtetegui (20 November 1887 — 15 December 1913) was a Mexican aviation pioneer. In 1909, built and flew his own glider. He was active in the service of the Mexican government during the Mexican Revolution, and his service would help to establish the Mexican Air Force.

Flying over Metropolitan Cathedral in Mexico City, he proved that planes can work at an altitude over 2,000 meters.

== Career ==
The first of Miguel Lebrija's known experiments with aviation came in April 1908, when he used an automobile to tow a biplane, coaxing it into flight. In 1910 Miguel Lebrija acquired the first plane in Mexico, a plane from Blériot Aéronautique owned by El Buen Tono, who were selling it because it could not fly. He fixed its engine and became the second person in Mexico to ever fly on 14 May 1910, flying for five minutes. In doing so, he also proved that an airplane could fly at the altitude of Mexico City, which is approximately 2,200 meters. He also acquired a Deperdussin.

In February 1913 Lebrija was refused a bombing run over Mexico City from Victoriano Huerta. Instead, he dropped test bombs at Llanos de Balbuena, the first airport in Mexico, in April 1913. Lebrija was promoted to the rank of 'Honorary Major' in the air force, then the Army's Auxiliary Aerial Militia Squadron (Escuadrilla Aérea de la Milicia Auxiliar del Ejército), and was sent off to New York and later France to purchase 20 airplanes and two dirigibles for the fledgling air force. Previously, similar missions had been denied to exist by Luis Perez Figueroa in July 1910. Regardless, Lebrija died in December in Paris after a surgery.

Lebrija was of the opinion that there would be thousands of Mexican airmen fighting in the Mexican air fleet in only a few years.

== Gallery ==
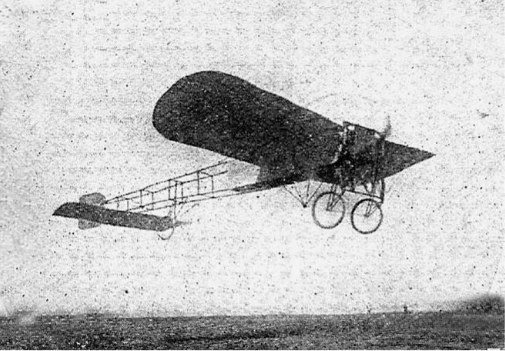
Miguel Lebrija taking flight in his Blériot, 24 July 1910
