= Loma Bonita Air Force Station =

Loma Bonita Air Force Station Estación Aérea Militar No. 8 de Loma Bonita
- IATA: none; ICAO: MX67; LID: LMB

Summary
- Airport type: Military
- Operator: Secretariat of National Defense
- Serves: Loma Bonita, Oaxaca
- Location: Loma Bonita Municipality
- Elevation AMSL: 90 ft / 30 m
- Coordinates: 18°01′24″N 095°51′13″W
- Website: https://www.gob.mx/defensa/acciones-y-programas/bases-aereas

Map
- Location of the airport in Oaxaca LMB (Mexico)

Runways
Direction	Length		Surface
Direction	ft	m	Surface
18/36	4,625	1,410	Asphalt
- SEDENA; DOF

Loma Bonita 8th Air Force Station (ICAO: MX67, AFAC: LMB) is a small military airfield located in the municipality of Loma Bonita, Oaxaca, 13 km south of the city of the same name. The military field where the airfield is located is the permanent headquarters of the 6th Motorized Cavalry Regiment "Centinelas del Papaloapan". Being an air station, it does not permanently house FAM air squadrons, but it is occasionally used by them. The airfield has an aviation platform of 8,100 square meters. The runway measures 1,400 m long and 28 m wide and has an orientation 18/36.

== Accidentes e incidentes ==
- On May 10, 1999, a Mexican Air Force Boeing 737, registered B-12001, was taking off during a training flight when it overshot the runway. The front landing gear collapsed, and the grass near the aircraft caught fire, also causing a fire inside the aircraft. All six occupants escaped unharmed.
