= Zapopan Air Force Base =

Mexican Air Force Base in Zapopan, Jalisco, Mexico

Zapopan Air Force Base Base Aérea Militar No. 5 Zapopan
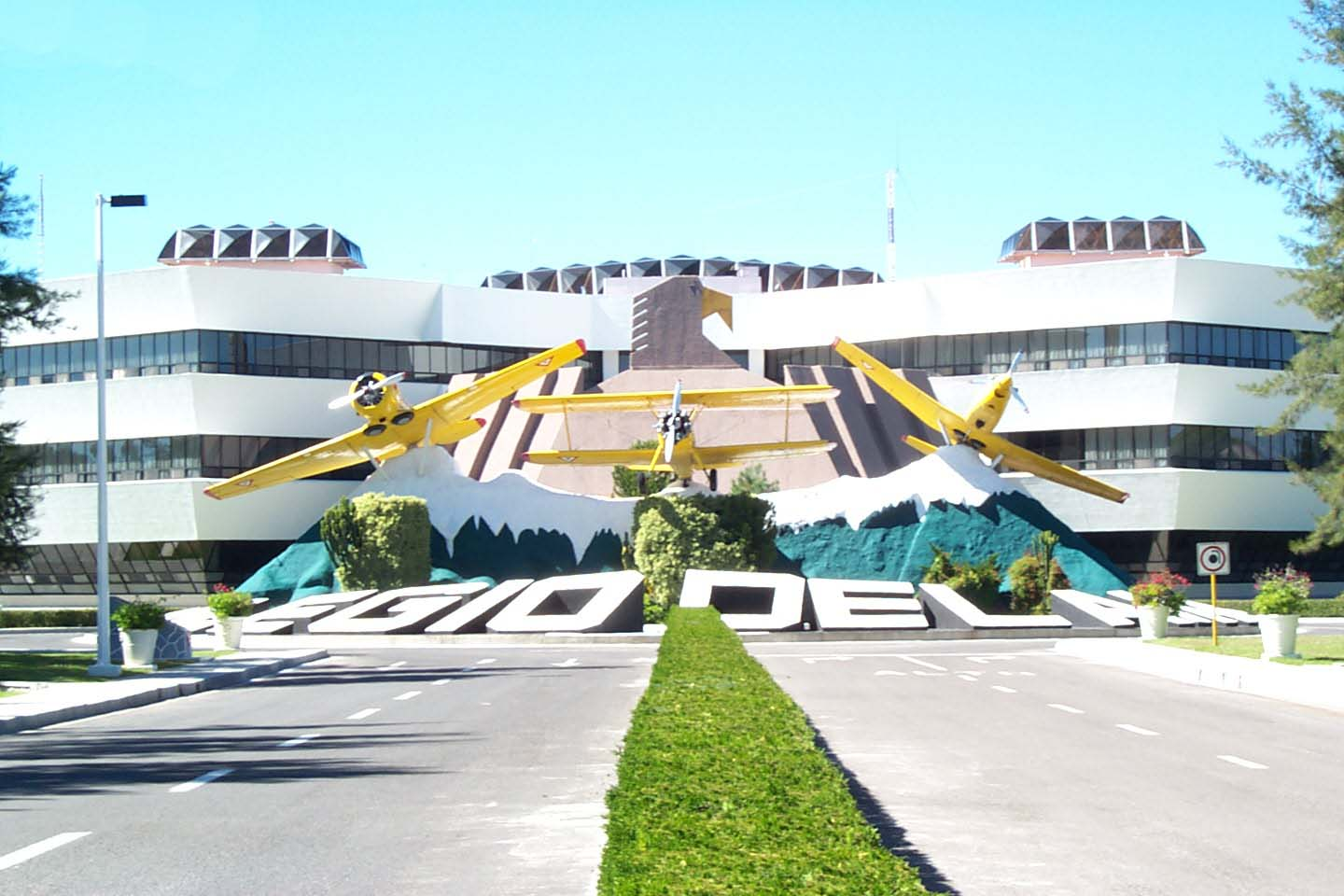
- IATA: ZAP; ICAO: MMZP; LID: ZAP

Summary
- Airport type: Military
- Owner/Operator: (Mexico) Mexican Air Force (United States) U.S. Air Force
- Location: Zapopan, Jalisco, Mexico
- Built: 1915
- Commander: General de Ala Piloto Aviador Diplomado de Estado Mayor Aéreo David Mascareñas Gutiérrez
- Time zone: CST (UTC-06:00)
- Elevation AMSL: 1,625 m / 5,331 ft
- Coordinates: 20°44′00″N 103°27′32″W
- Website: www.gob.mx/sedena

Map
- Location of the Air Force Base in Jalisco ZAP (Mexico)

Runways
Direction	Length		Surface
Direction	m	ft	Surface
08L/26R	2,700	8,858	Asphalt
08R/26L	3,000	9,842	Concrete
09/27	1,200	3,937	Asphalt
- SEDENA

Zapopan Air Force Base (Spanish: Base Aérea Militar Zapopan) (B.A.M. 5); officially Base Aérea Militar N° 5 Piloto Aviador Capitán Emilio Carranza Rodríguez (Air Force Base No. 5 Pilot Aviator Captain Emilio Carranza Rodríguez) (IATA: ZAP, ICAO: MMZP) is a military airport located in Zapopan, Jalisco, Mexico.

Situated within the Guadalajara Metropolitan area, approximately 14 kilometres (8.7 mi) northwest of the city center, the Air Force Base is situated at an elevation of 1,625 metres (5,331 ft) above sea level, it features three asphalt-surfaced runways: Runway 08L/26R, measuring 2,700 metres (8,858 ft), Runway 08R/26L at 3,000 metres (9,843 ft), and Runway 09/27 spanning 1,200 metres (3,937 ft). The airport's apron provides parking positions for narrow-body aircraft and helipads. Adjacent facilities include 7 hangars, a control tower, and additional structures to house Air Force personnel.

Zapopan Air Force Base is home to the 105th Air Squadron, which operates Cessna 182 aircraft. Furthermore, it is utilized by the 111th Air Squadron operating Bell 212, as well as by Air College Training Squadrons employing Boeing-Stearman Model 75, Pilatus PC-7, Aermacchi SF-260, and Grob G 120TP aircraft. Additionally, the base serves as the location for various educational institutions, including the Air College (Colegio del Aire), the Military Aviation School (Escuela Militar de Aviación) (E.M.A.), the Military School of Maintenance and Supply (Escuela Militar de Mantenimiento y Abastecimiento) (E.M.M.A.), and the Military School of Air Force Specialists (Escuela Militar de Especialistas de Fuerza Aérea) (E.M.E.F.A.).

== Gallery ==
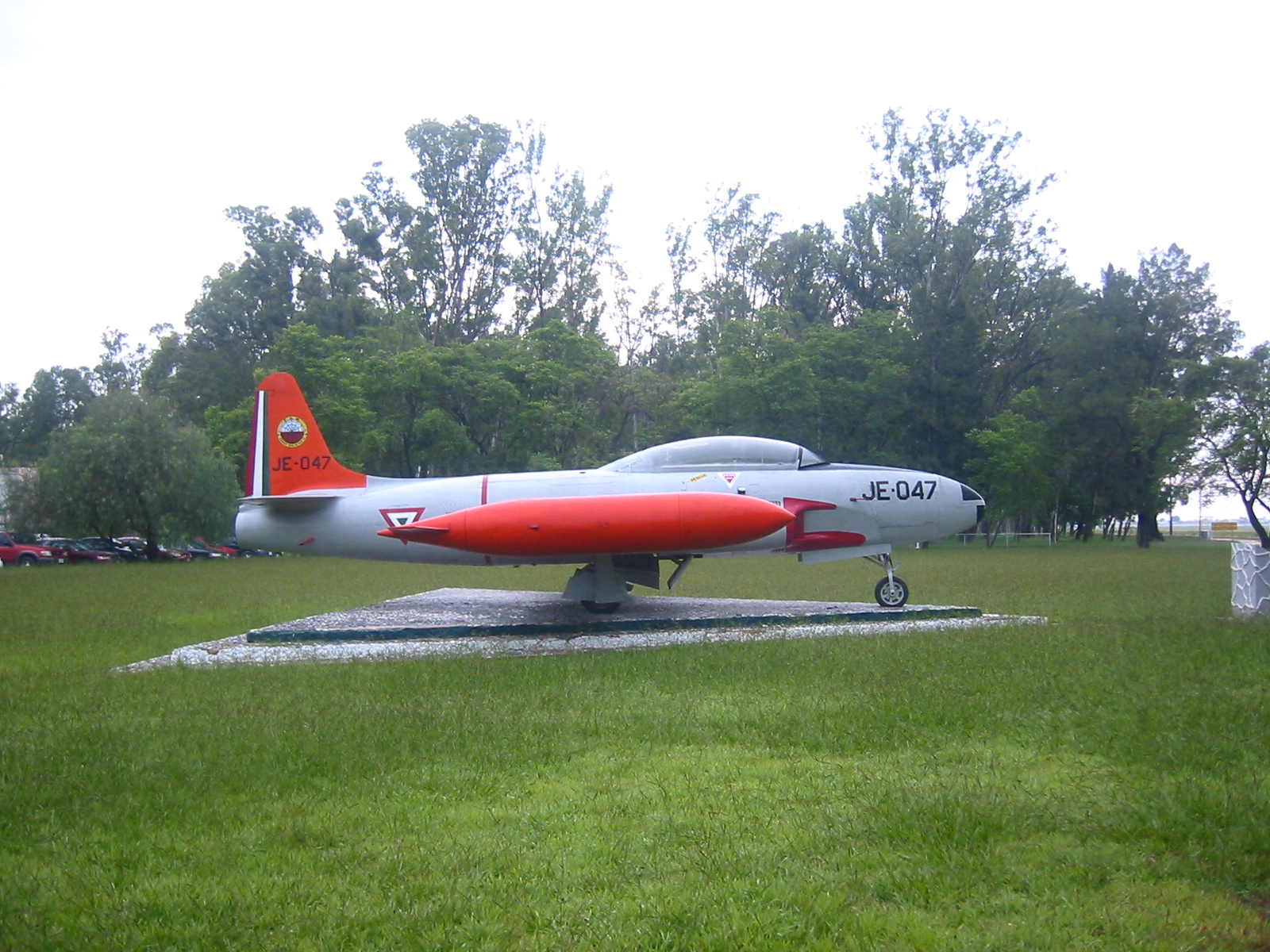

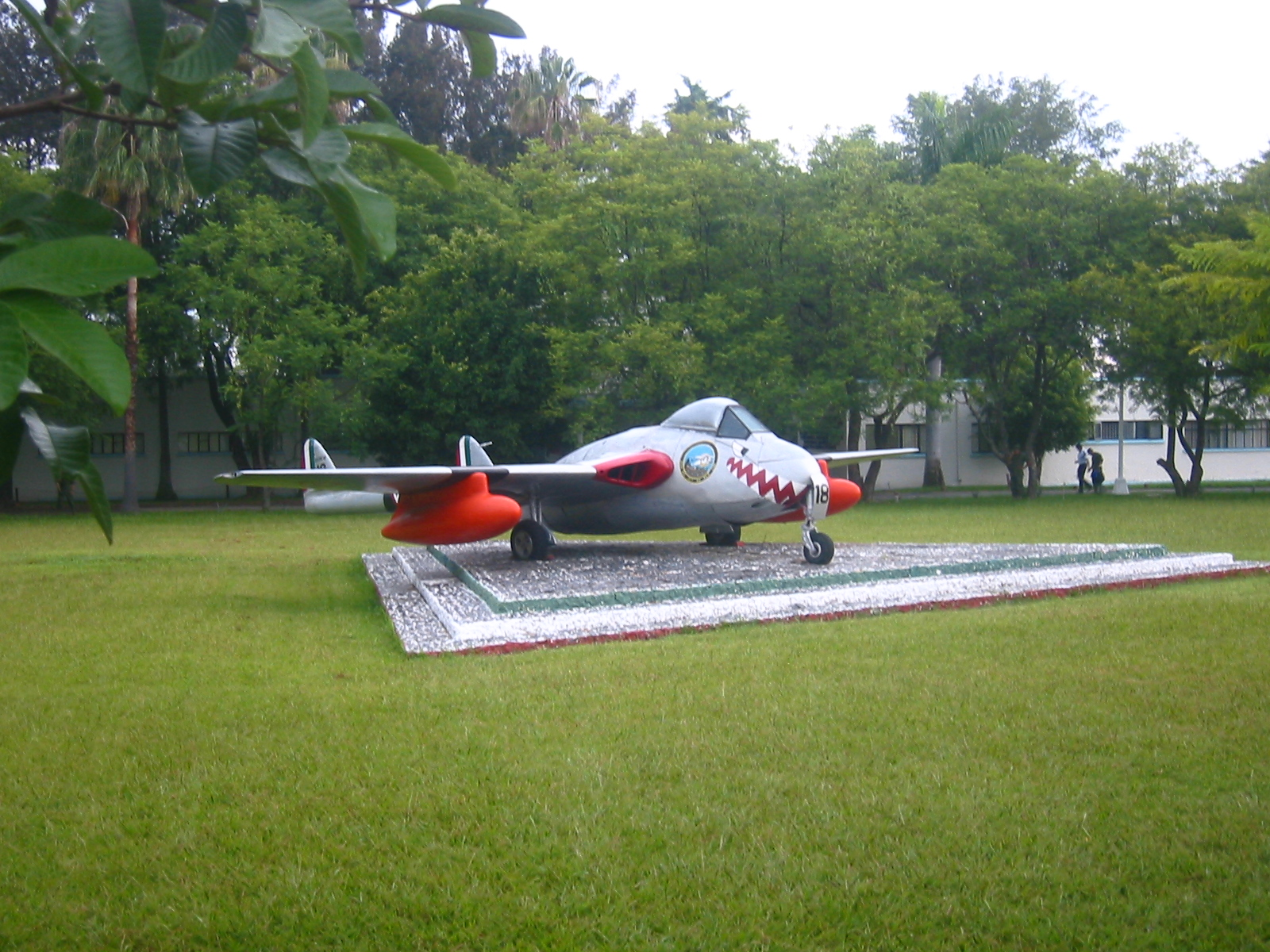

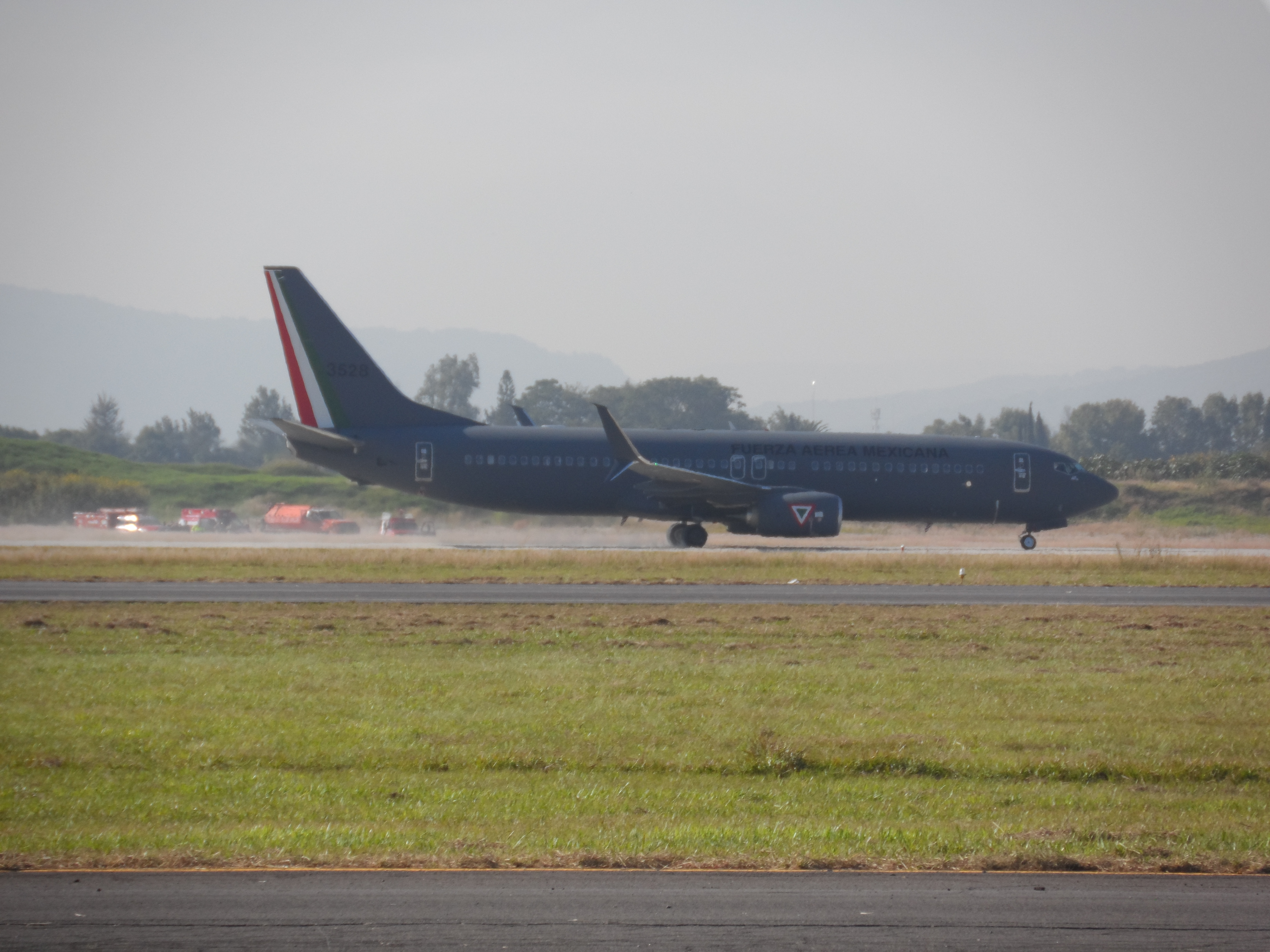

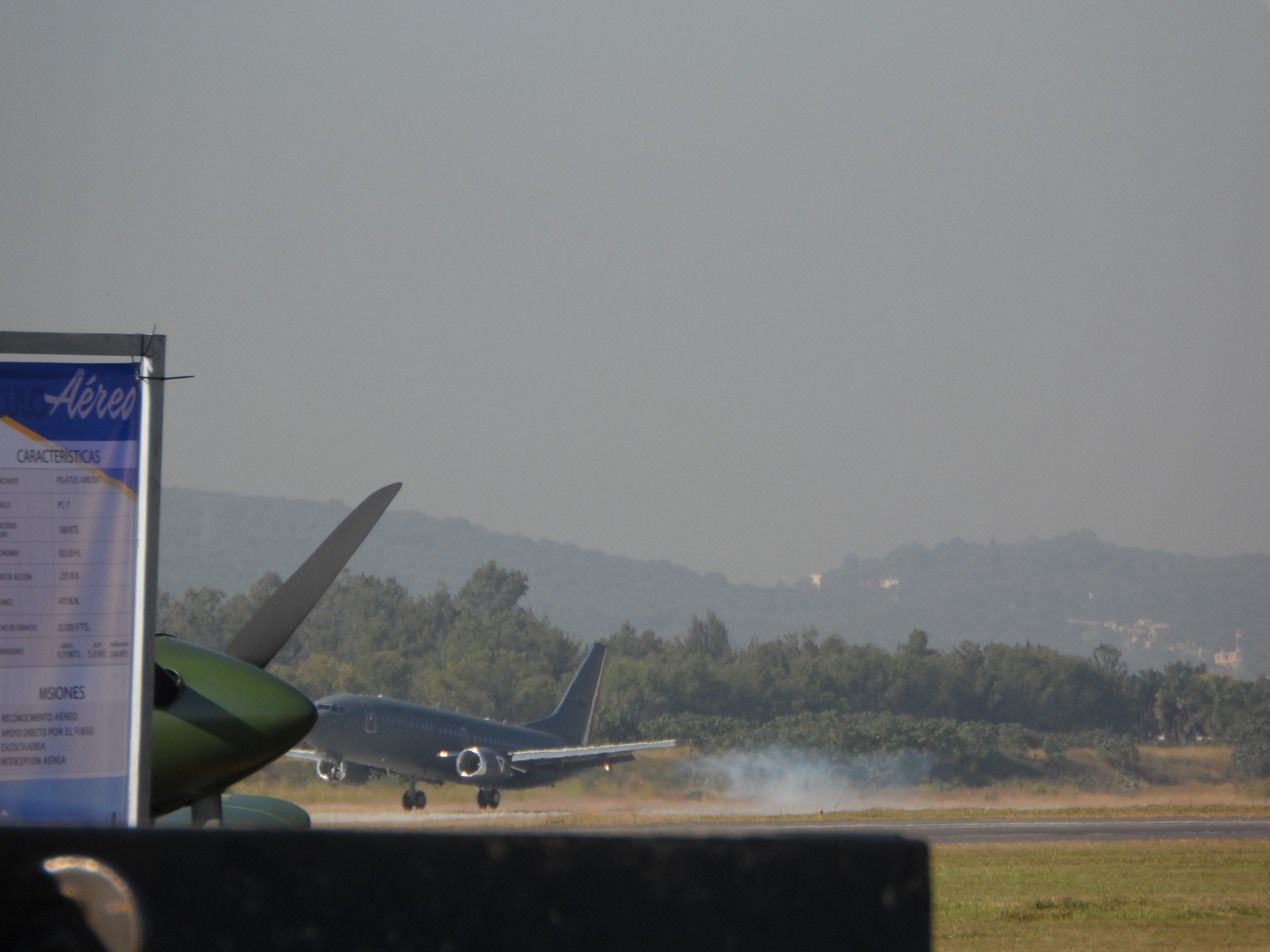

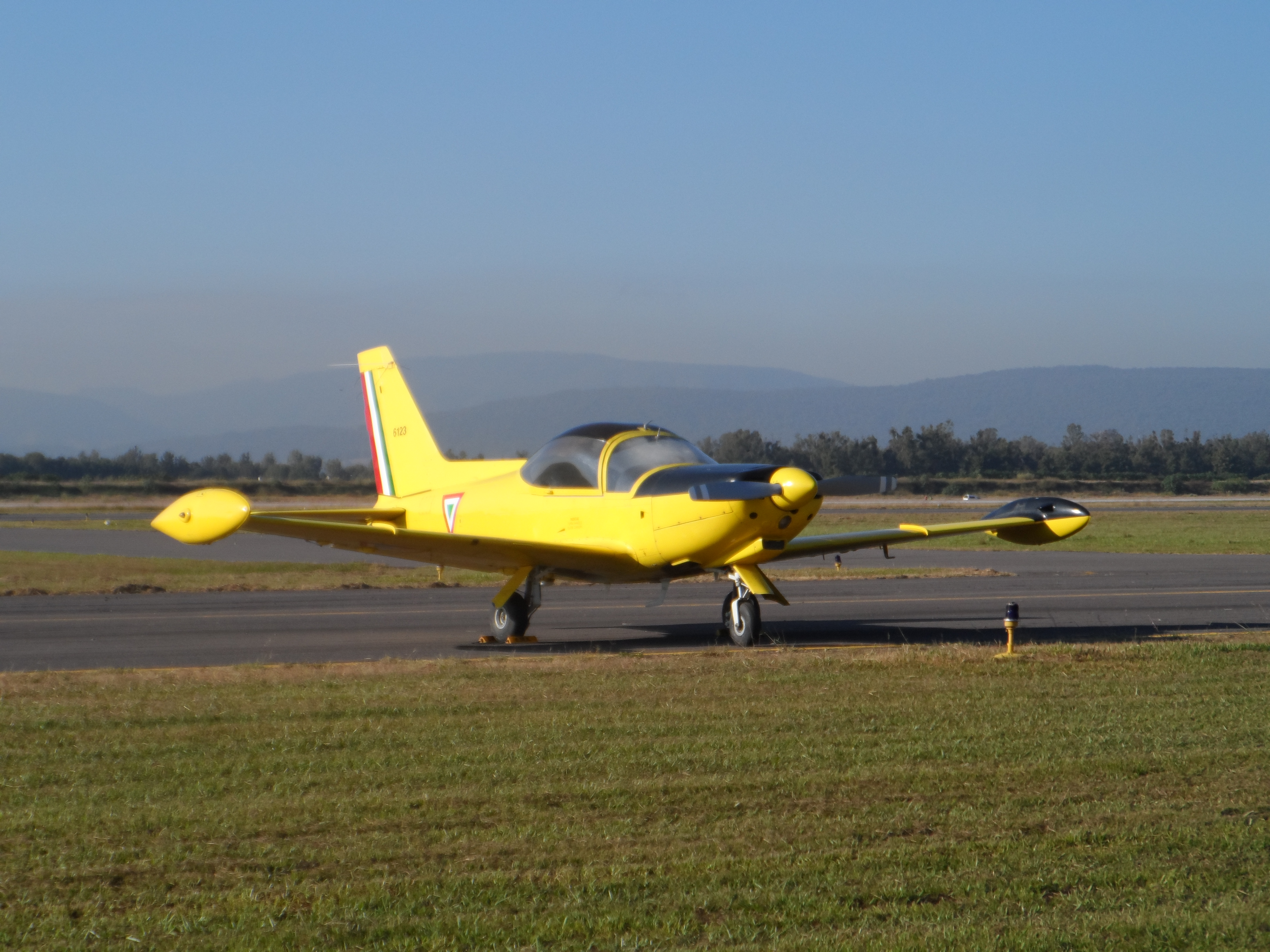

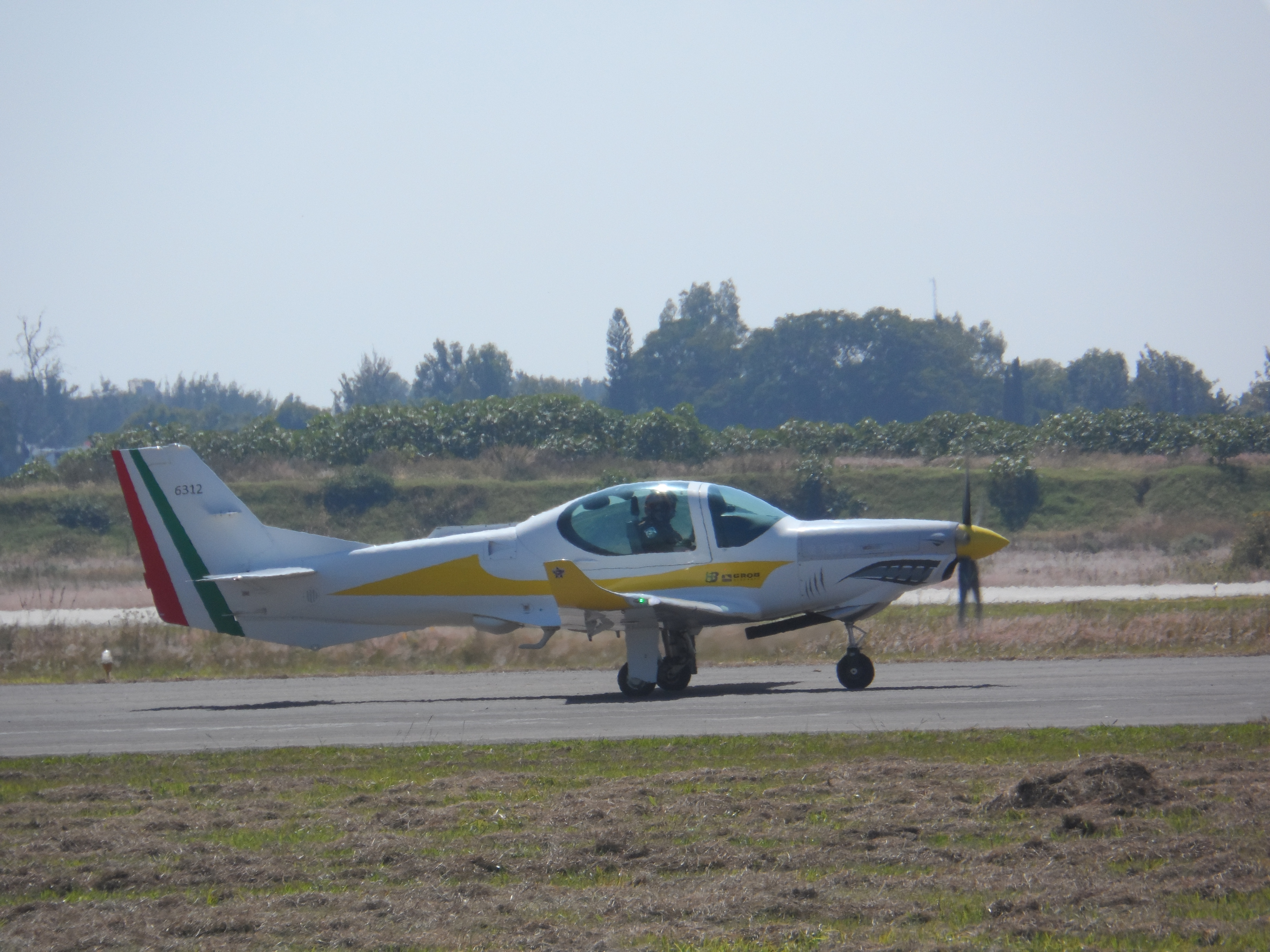

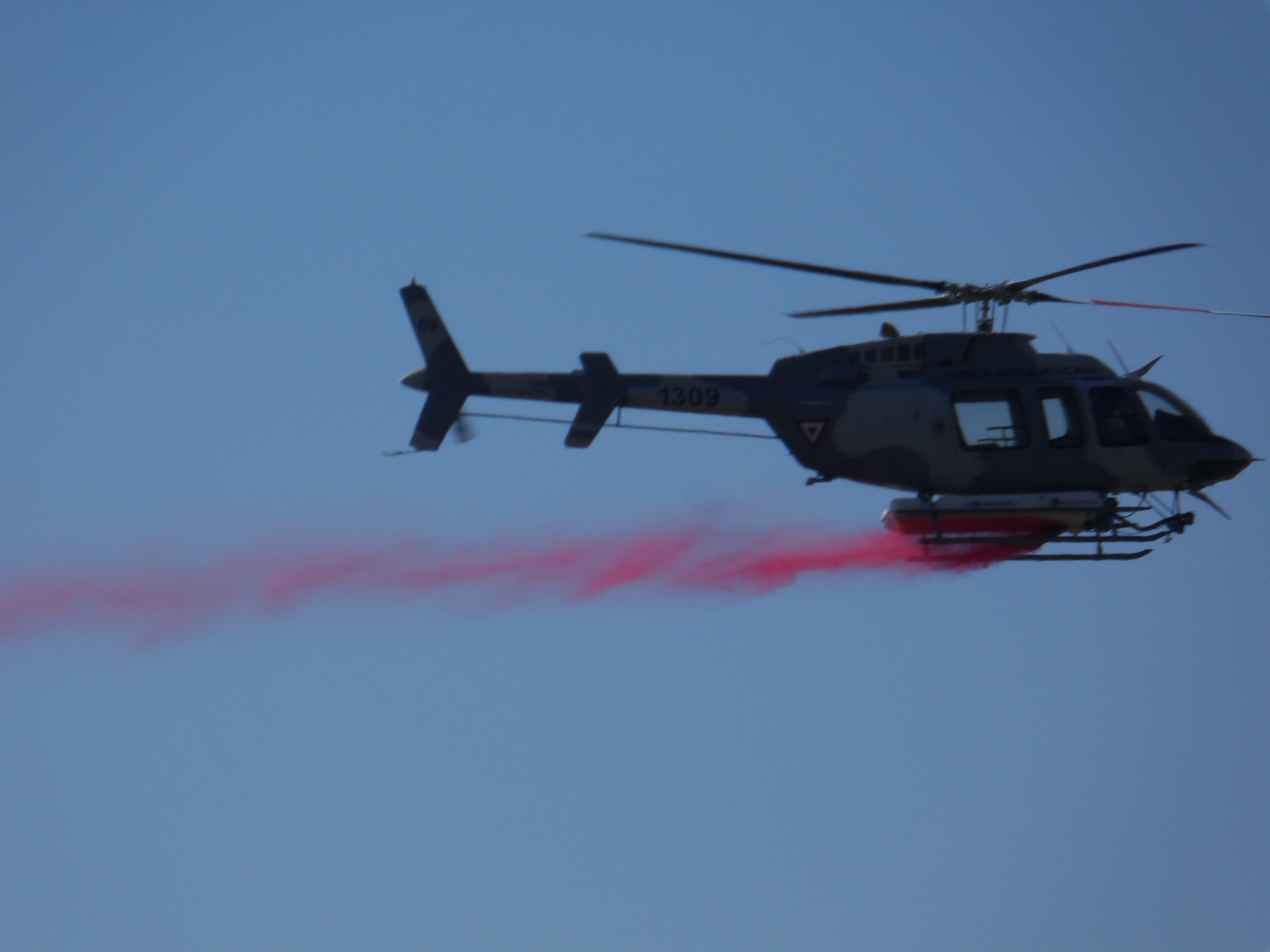

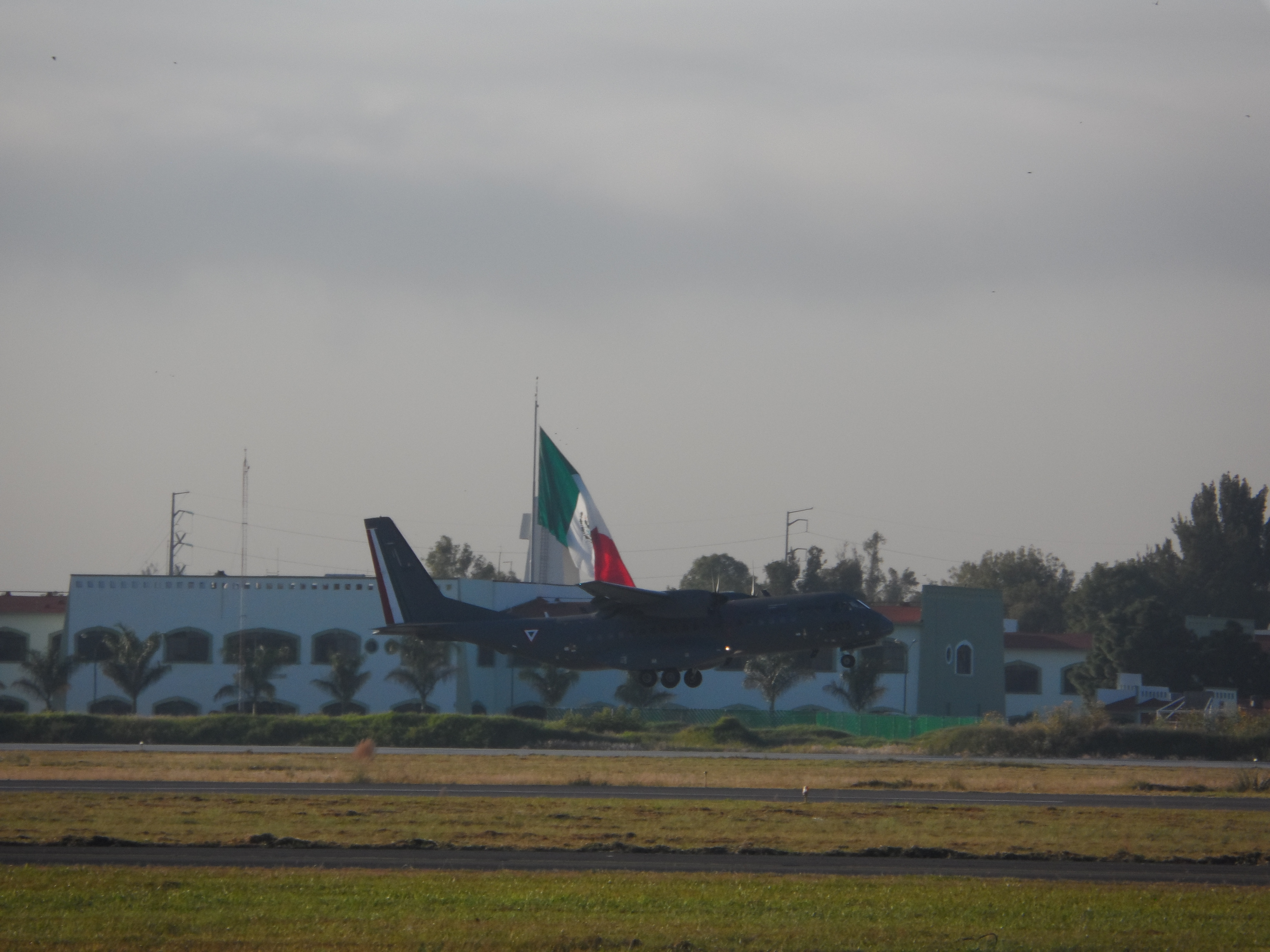

== See also ==
- List of airports in Mexico
- List of airports by ICAO code: M
- List of Mexican military installations
- Mexican Air Force
- Guadalajara International Airport
