= Irapuato Air Force Station =

Irapuato Air Force Station Estación Aérea Militar No. 6 de Irapuato
- IATA: none; ICAO: MM70; LID: IPT

Summary
- Airport type: Military
- Operator: Secretariat of National Defense
- Serves: Irapuato, Guanajuato
- Location: Irapuato Municipality
- Commander: General de Brigada de Estado Mayor José Francisco Terán Valle
- Elevation AMSL: 5,689 ft (1,734 m)
- Coordinates: 20°40′24″N 101°18′43″W
- Website: www.gob.mx/defensa/regiones-militares

Map
- Location of the airport in Guanajuato IPT (Mexico)

Runways
Direction	Length		Surface
Direction	ft	m	Surface
03/21	5,800	1,768	Asphalt

Helipads
Number	Length		Surface
Number	ft	m	Surface
H1	82	25	Asphalt
H2	66	20	Asphalt
H3	66	20	Asphalt
H4-GN	125	38	Asphalt
- SEDENA

Irapuato 6th Air Force Station is a Mexican military airfield located east of Irapuato, Guanajuato. It is situated within the facilities of the 12th Military Zone of the Mexican Army, which is home to the 8th Armored Reconnaissance Regiment, the 12th Military Police Brigade, and the 34th Battalion of the National Guard.

== Facilities ==
It has a 5,800-foot-long and 62-foot-wide runway with turning circles at both ends, and a 26,910-square-meter aviation apron marked with three 70-foot-diameter helipads (although the National Guard's Territorial Coordination facilities have another helipad with a 130-foot diameter). It is located within the 12th Military Zone, which covers 865 acres.
