= Hydra Technologies Ehécatl =

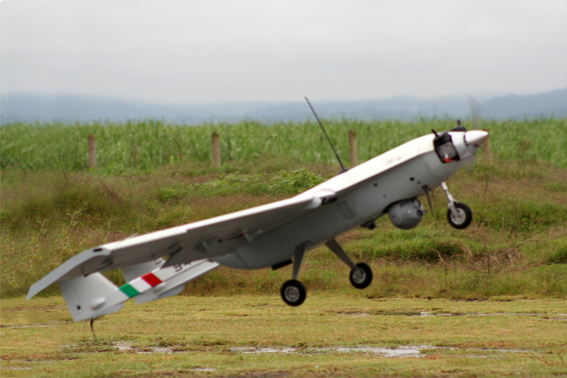
- The S4 Ehécatl in take-off mode

General information
- Type: Unmanned aerial vehicle
- Manufacturer: Hydra Technologies of Mexico
- Designer: Hydra Technologies of Mexico; CONACYT; National Polytechnic Institute; Autonomous University of Guadalajara; ITESO
- Status: Active
- Primary user: Mexican Secretariat of Public Security

History
- Introduction date: 2006
- First flight: 2006

The S4 Ehécatl is an unmanned aerial vehicle developed and manufactured by Hydra Technologies of Mexico which, except for its infrared thermal sensor system, is the first of its type to be completely designed and manufactured in Mexico. It is named after Ehecatl, the Aztec god of the wind.

== Overview ==
A prototype of the airplane was presented in the Paris Air Show at Le Bourget on June 19, 2007. In August 2007 at Washington D.C., a full-scale model was exhibited at the Association for Unmanned Vehicle Systems International (AUVSI) symposium, an aeronautics exposition with over 275 exhibitors. At the conclusion of the AUSVI symposium Hydra Technologies became the first non-U.S. recipient of the AUSVI's 'Al Aube Outstanding Contributor Award' for the development of the S4 Ehécatl UAS (Unmanned Aerial System).

In 2008, Hydra Technologies received the Leonardo da Vinci award, given by the International Aeronautics Congress of Mexico (CIAM for its Spanish abbreviation) for the development of the S4 Ehácatl, as well as the E1 Gavilán.

On August 3, 2008, the State of Jalisco and Coecytjal presented Hydra with an award in the 29th Annual National Convention of the National Chamber of Electronics, Telecommunications and Informatics Industry (CANIETI), for its contribution to the informatics, microelectronics and communications industries in Mexico.

== Description ==
The S4 Ehécatl is an aerial unmanned surveillance system whose development began in 2002. Its principal market is directed towards providing security and surveillance capabilities in support of the Armed Forces, as well as civilian protection in hazardous situations. Because of its small size and unmanned nature, it can enter dangerous zones without being detected.

Apart from a U.S.-made FLIR infrared thermal sensor system, all of the S4 Ehécatl's componentry and avionics are designed, developed and manufactured in Mexico by the firm Hydra Technologies. The S4 Ehécatl has an electronic system that is designed to provide up to eight hours of autonomous flight, in either daytime or nighttime conditions. The craft is controlled from a mobile central facility installed in a specially equipped three-man ground vehicle.

The surveillance capabilities of the UAV was suggested as an option to survey of the border problems between the U.S. and Mexico. The project developing the craft is a joint effort of the Mexican Federal Government, the Financial Sector, and Mexican academic and scientific institutions like CONACYT, the National Polytechnic Institute (IPN), the Autonomous University of Guadalajara and the Western Institute of Technology and Higher Education (ITESO).

== Specifications ==
General characteristics

- Wingspan: 3.7 m (12 ft 2 in)
- Max takeoff weight: 54.43 kg (120 lb)Powerplant
- Powerplant: 2 × 2-stroke engines
- Propellers: 2 or 3-bladed

Performance

- Maximum speed: 170 km/h (100 mph, 90 kn)
- Cruise speed: 70 km/h (44 mph, 38 kn)
- Endurance: 8h
- Service ceiling: 4,572 m (15,000 ft)

Avionics
General Dynamics Advanced Information Systems

== Operators ==
- Mexico Used by various government agencies and police organizations.

== Gallery ==
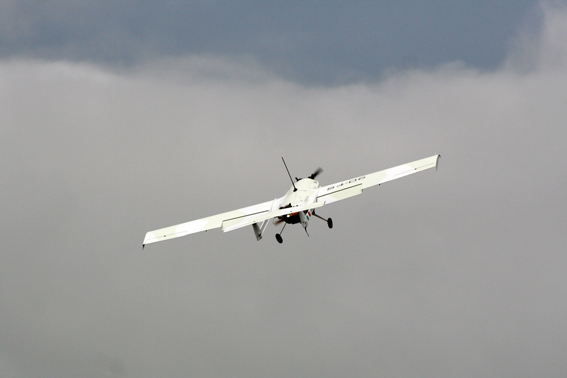
The S4 Ehécatl in flight

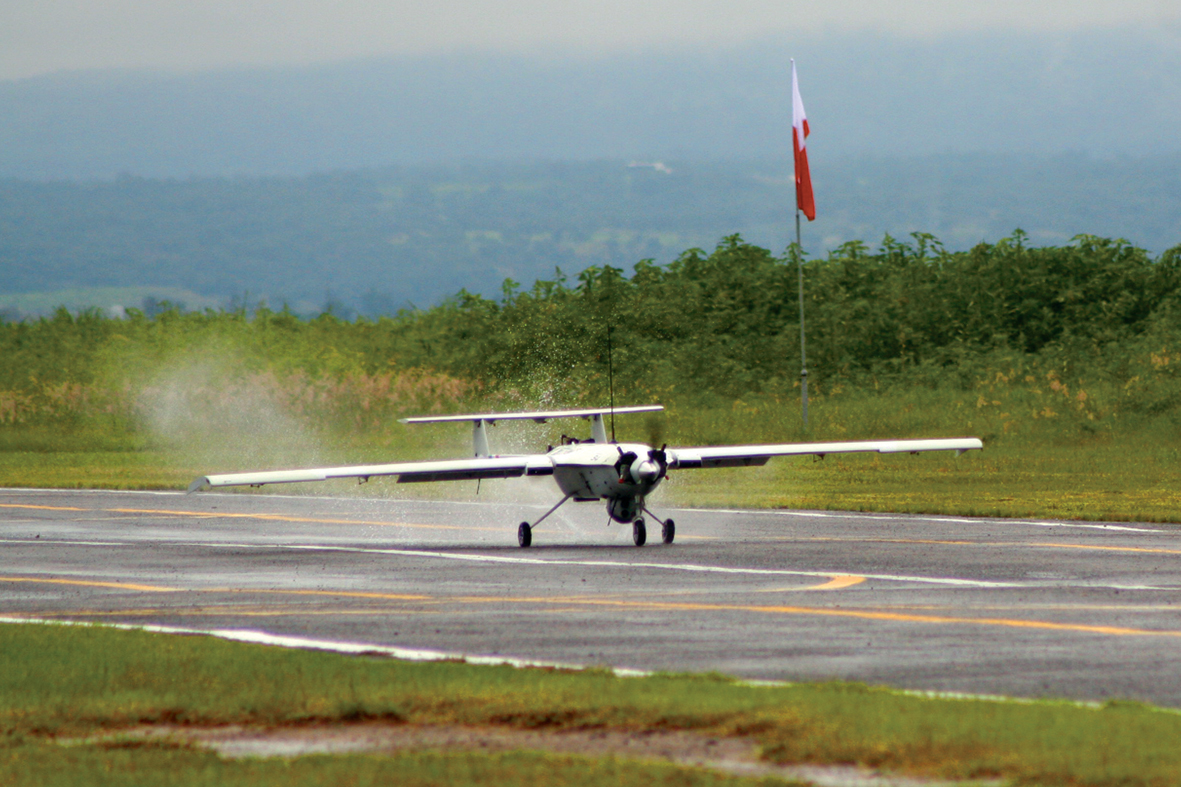
The S4 Ehécatl landing

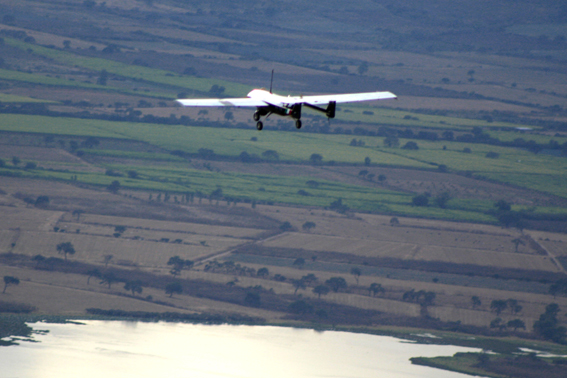
The S4 Ehécatl in flight

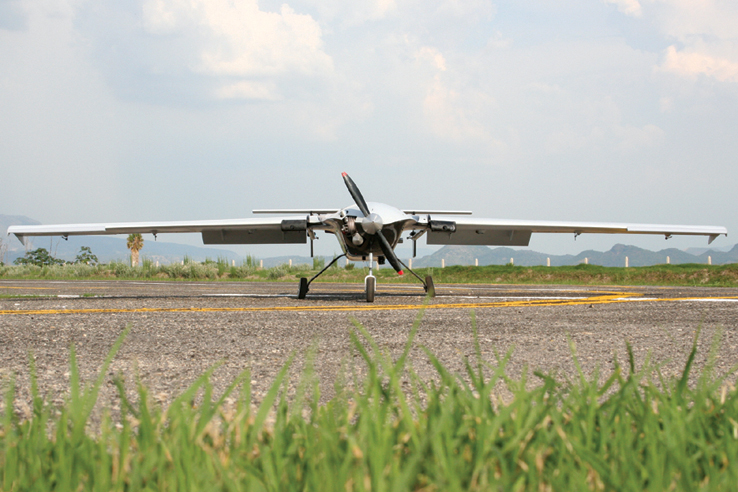
The S4 Ehécatl front
