= Association for Uncrewed Vehicle Systems International =

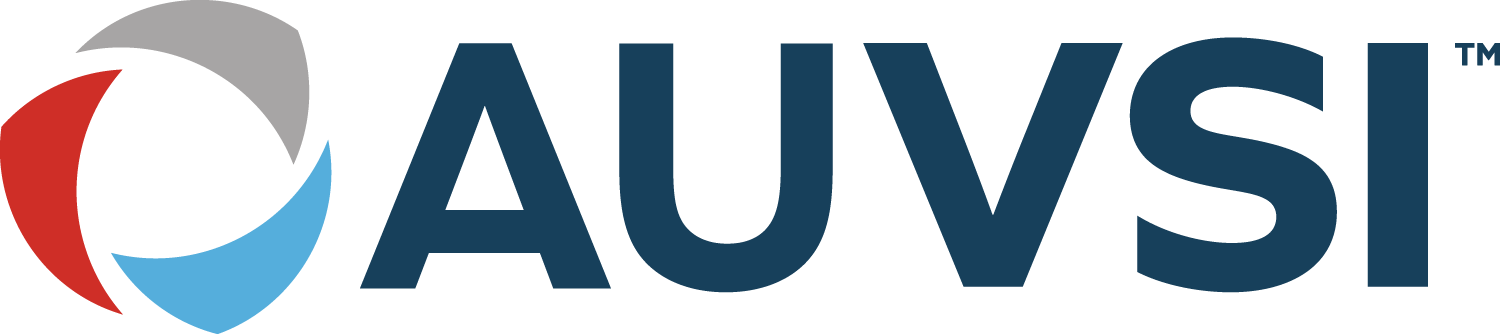
- Abbreviation: AUVSI
- Formation: 1972
- Founded at: Dayton, Ohio
- Type: Nonprofit
- Purpose: Advocacy, education and leadership
- Headquarters: Arlington, VA
- Members: Government, commercial and academic members from 60+ countries
- President & CEO: Michael Robbins
- Main organ: Executive Committee and Board of Directors
- Website: www.auvsi.org
- Formerly called: NARPV

The Association for Uncrewed Vehicle Systems International (AUVSI) is the world's largest nonprofit membership organization dedicated to the advancement of uncrewed systems, autonomy, and robotics.

The AUVSI membership includes over 400 leading organizations and 7,000 world-class professionals in the defense, civil, and commercial markets. Its members operate in the air, ground, maritime, space, and cybersecurity domains.

An influential advocacy organization, AUVSI advocates for policies that support innovation and the safe integration of uncrewed systems, autonomy, and robotics.

== Mission ==
AUVSI’s mission is to drive the uncrewed systems industry’s growth and solve industry’s challenges by addressing points of friction. We unite innovators, manufacturers, operators, and stakeholders to share knowledge, create market opportunities, and advocate for effective policies that maximize the benefits of autonomous technologies.

== History ==
AUVSI was the brainchild of a group of U.S. Air Force officers, inspired by the use of target drones as reconnaissance assets during the Vietnam War. Established in Dayton, Ohio, in 1972, the organization was originally known as the National Association of Remotely Piloted Vehicles (NARPV). In 1974, Ohio's Wright Kettering Chapter hosted the organization's first national symposium.

By the late 1970s, RPVs were being called Unmanned Air Vehicles (UAVs). The newly recognized term “unmanned” encompassed more than air vehicles, and recognition of the growing developments in the ground, maritime and space arenas caused the organization to broaden its reach. In 1978, the NARPV expanded its focus and services to create a community inclusive of all unmanned systems disciplines and changed its name to the Association for Unmanned Vehicle Systems (AUVS). In 1982, the headquarters moved from Dayton to Washington, DC.

Through the 1980s and 1990s, AUVSI mirrored the fast pace of growth of the worldwide unmanned systems industry, and the need for the organization's services began to extend beyond Washington, D.C. In 1996, the AUVS became the Association for Unmanned Vehicle Systems International (AUVSI) to reflect the true scope of the organization.

By 2003, AUVSI's global activities led to the creation of the International Opportunities Program (IOP), a campaign to raise awareness of AUVSI, increase member services and strengthen the worldwide network of the unmanned systems industry. AUVSI's global activities are now a fundamental part of AUVSI's commitment to the growth, long-term viability and stability of the uncrewed systems industry.
