= Lower Rio Grande Valley =

Metropolitan region in South Texas

Rio Grande Valley
- Region
- Lower Rio Grande Valley
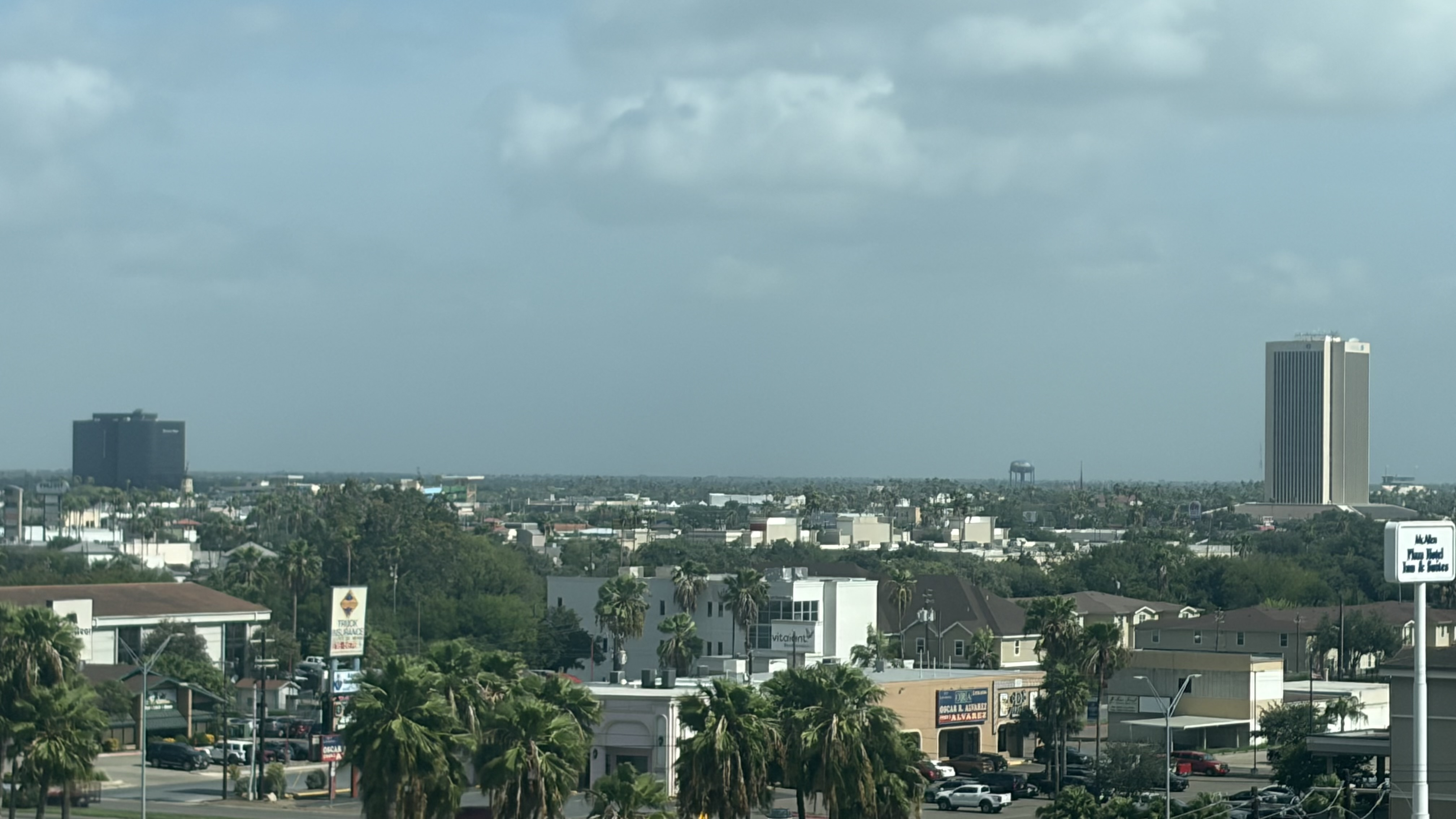
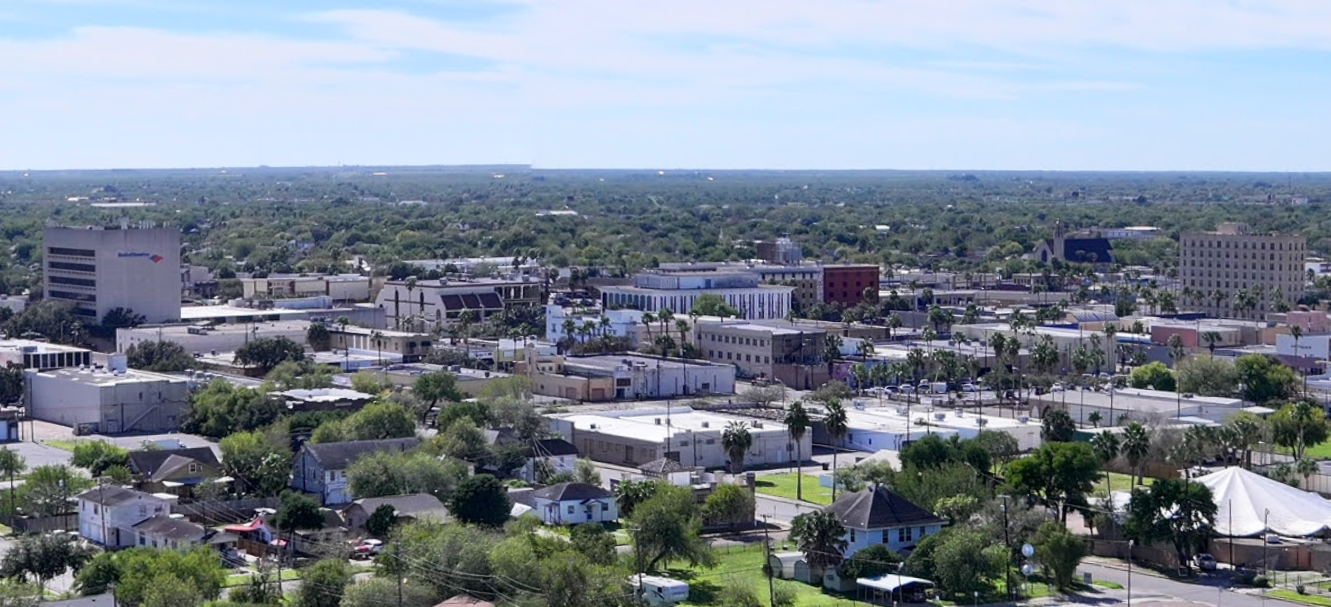
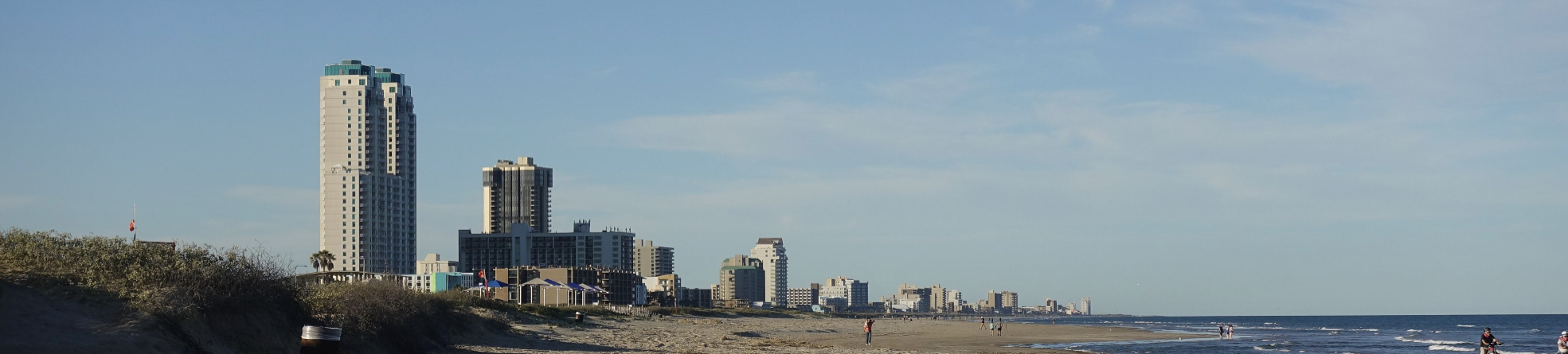
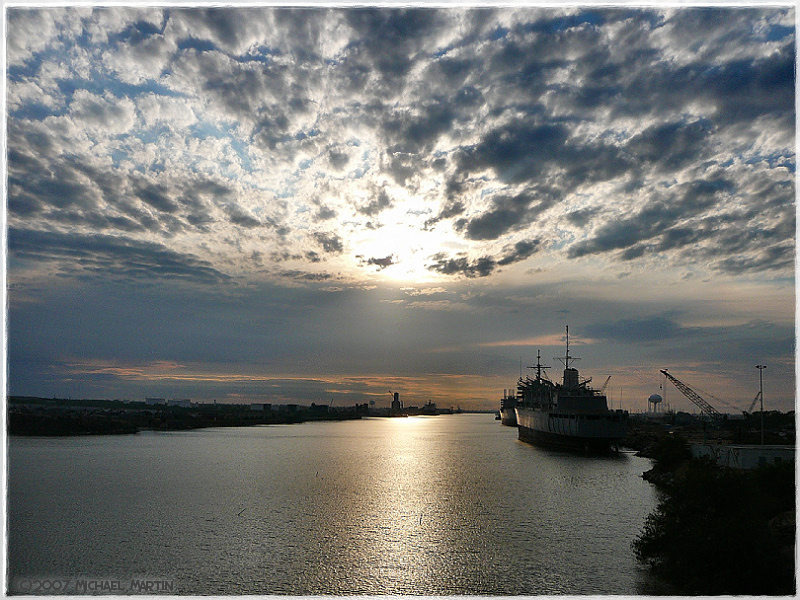
- Images, from top down, left to right: Skyline of McAllen; Skyline of Harlingen; Skyline of South Padre Island; Sunset over the Port of Brownsville
- Nicknames: The Valley, El Valle, RGV, The 956
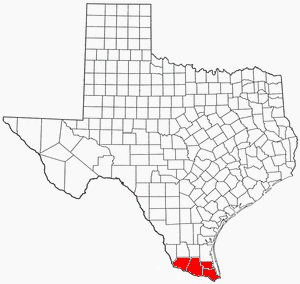
- Map of the Lower Rio Grande Valley
- Coordinates: 26.22°N 98.12°W
- Country: United States
- State: Texas
- Principal cities: Brownsville, McAllen, Edinburg, Mission, Pharr, Harlingen, Rio Grande City, Raymondville
- Largest city: Brownsville, Texas

Area
  - Land: 4,276 sq mi (11,070 km^{2})

Population (2025)
  - Total: 1,441,785
- Demonym: Valleyite
- Area code: 956

The Lower Rio Grande Valley, often referred to as the [Rio Grande] Valley (RGV) of South Texas, is a metropolitan region located in the southernmost part of Texas. The Rio Grande Valley is not a true valley, but a river delta and floodplain of the Rio Grande near its mouth. It consists of the Brownsville-Harlingen and McAllen-Edinburg-Mission metropolitan areas, and the Rio Grande City-Roma and Raymondville micropolitan areas. Cameron County, Texas is home to the SpaceX Starbase spaceport, situated in Boca Chica; it is also the residence of Elon Musk.

== History ==
=== Precontact era ===
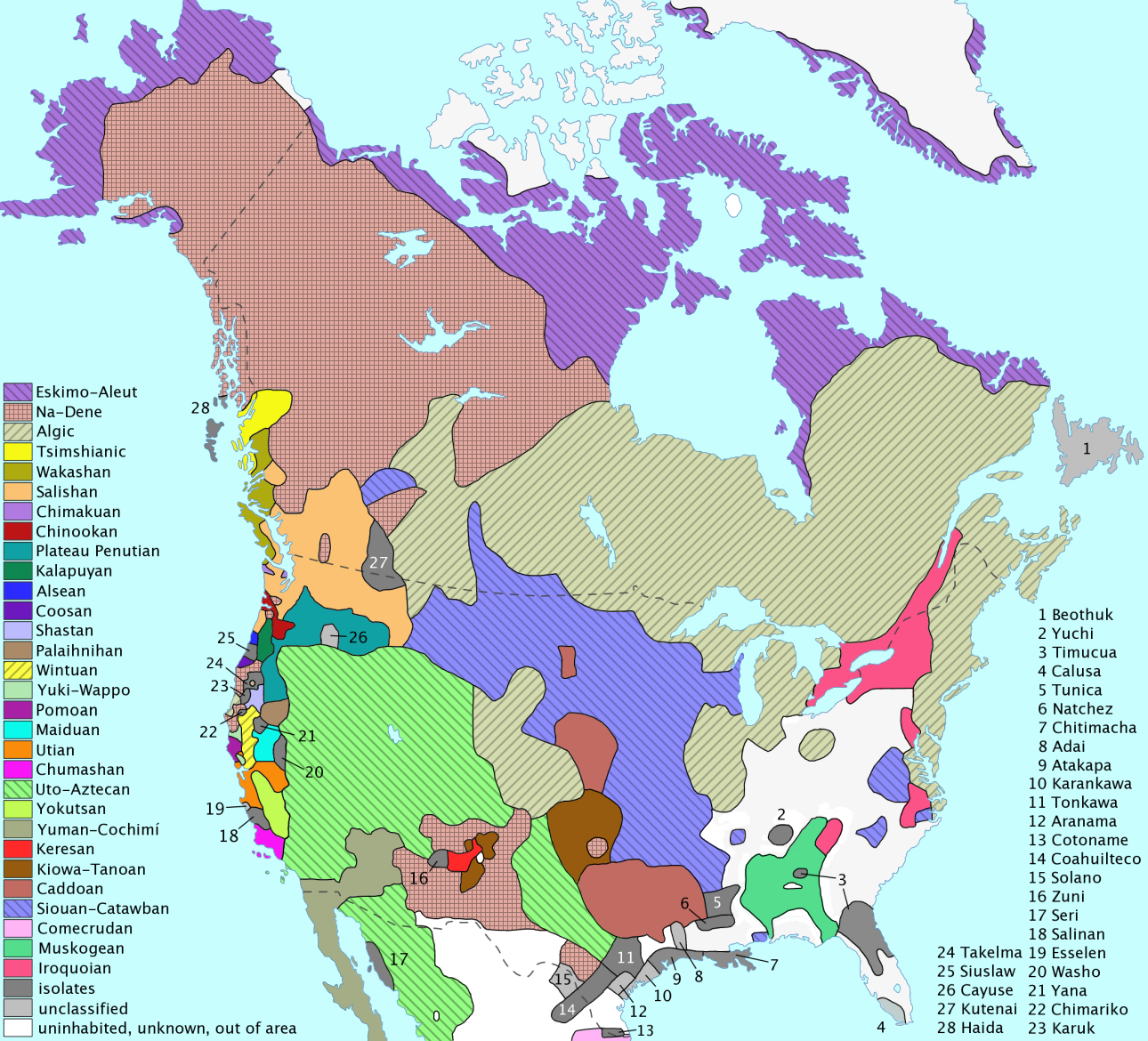
Map of indigenous peoples in North America

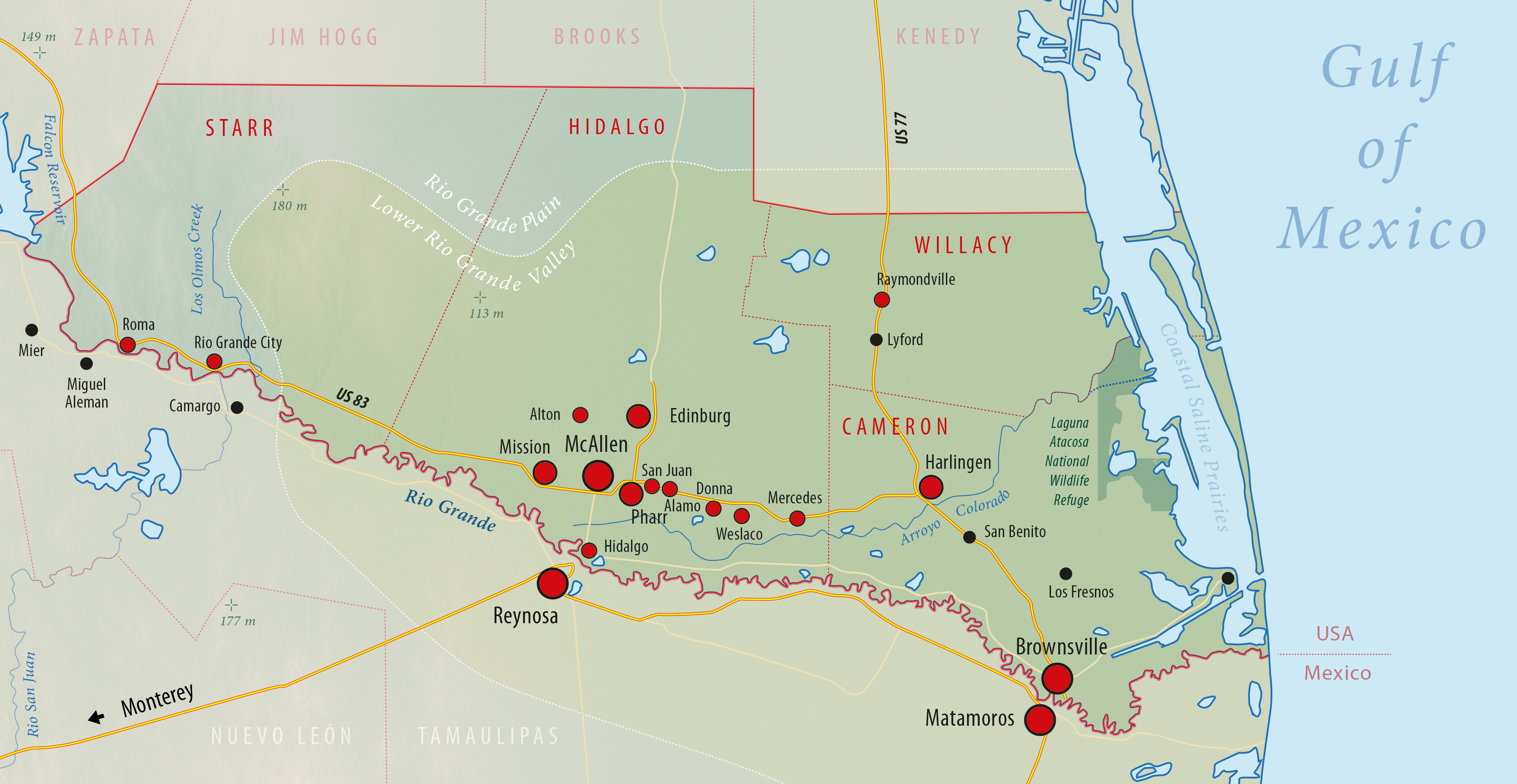
Map showing the Lower Rio Grande Valley.

Native peoples lived in small tribes in the area before the Spanish conquest. The native tribes in South Texas were known to be hunter-gatherer peoples. The area was known for its smaller nomadic tribes collectively called Coahuiltecan. Excavations near Brownsville, at the Brownsville-Barril complex sites have shown evidence of prehistoric groups' shell trading.

=== Hispanic era ===
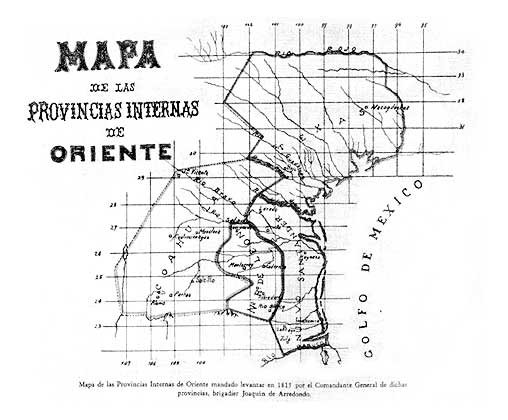
Map of Spanish Colonies along the Gulf of Mexico in 1815

Initially, the Spanish had a hard time conquering the area due to the differences in native languages, so they mainly focused on the Gulf Coast area known as the Seno Mexicano. Also, a major conflict existed on who would conquer the region. Antonio Ladrón de Guevara wanted to colonize the region, but the Viceroy of New Spain José Tienda de Cuervo doubted Ladrón de Guevara's character, eventually leading to a royal Spanish declaration preventing Ladrón de Guevara from participating in colonization efforts.

The first villas in the region were settled in Laredo and Reynosa in 1767. In 1805, the Spanish government solidified the autonomy of the region by defining the territory of Nuevo Santander as south of the colony of Texas from the Nueces River south to Tampico, Charcas, and Valles. The local government of the region had a rough start with various indigenous wars up until 1812. In 1821 after the Mexican War of Independence, the state was renamed Tamaulipas.

=== Anglo era ===
Map of the Republic of Texas 1841 with expansive borders

The Texas Revolution of 1835–1836 put the majority of what is now called the Rio Grande Valley under contested Texan sovereignty. The area also became a thoroughfare for runaway slaves fleeing to Mexico.

In 1844, the United States under President James K. Polk annexed the Republic of Texas, against British and Mexican sentiments, contributing to the onset of the Mexican–American War. The area along the Rio Grande was the source of several major battles, including the Battle of Resaca de la Palma near Brownsville. The war ended in 1848 with the signing of the Treaty of Guadalupe Hidalgo which defined the United States' southern border as the Rio Grande. The change in government led to a mass migration from Tamaulipas to the United States side of the river.

From the end of the Mexican-American War, the population of the Valley began to grow, and farmers began to raise cattle in the area. Despite the end of the formal war in 1848, interracial strife continued between native peoples and the white settlers over land through the 1920s.

=== Early 1900s and the Mexican Revolution ===
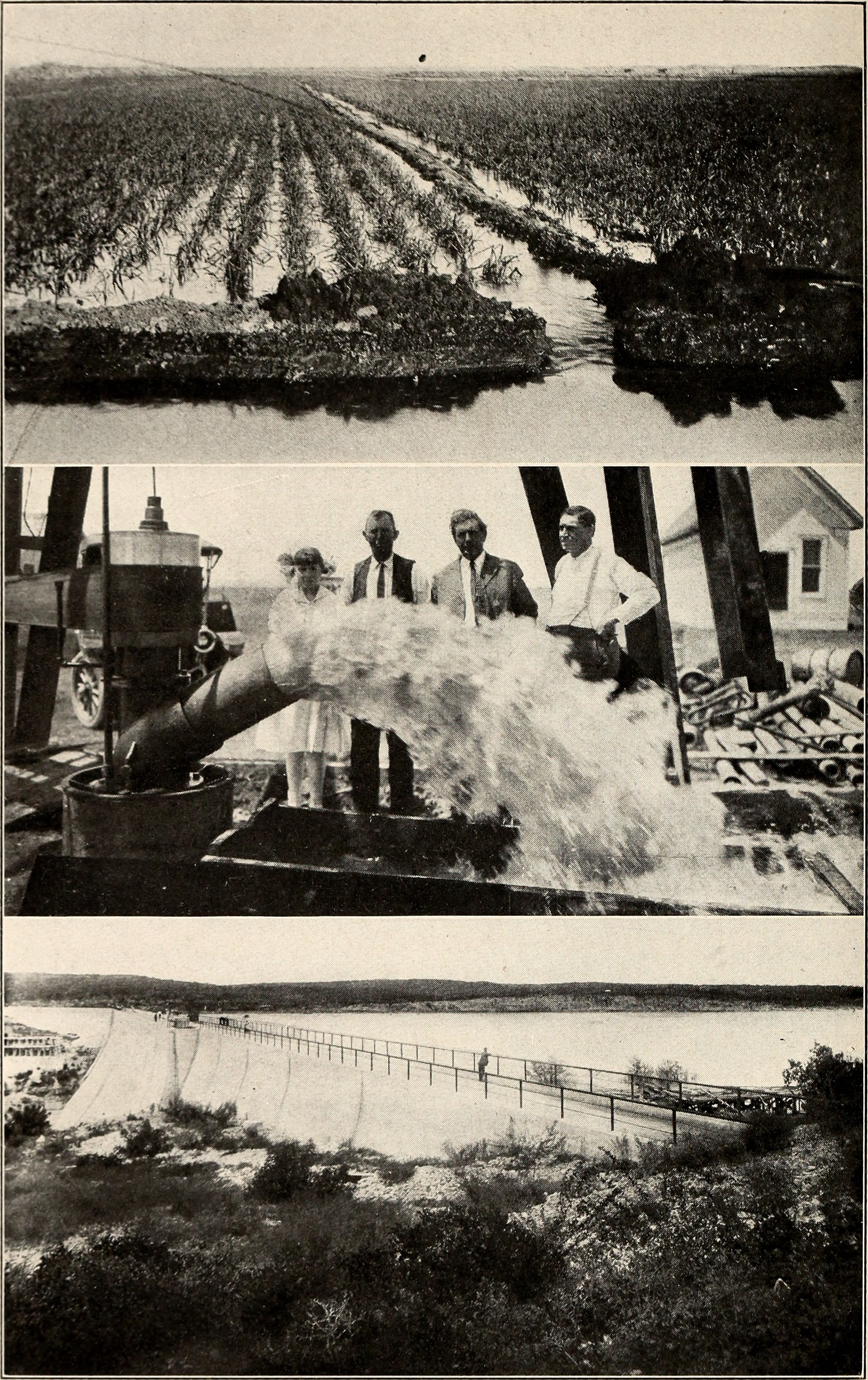
Irrigation outside of San Benito, Texas in 1916

At the turn of the 20th century trade and immigration between Mexico and the United States was quite frequent. The development of the St. Louis, Brownsville, and Mexico Railway in 1903 and the irrigation of the Rio Grande allowed the Rio Grande Valley to develop into profitable farmland. Droughts in the 1890s and early 1900s caused smaller farmers and cattle ranchers to lose their lands. Rich white settlers brought by the railroad bought the land and displaced the Tejano ranchers.

Meanwhile, across the river, Mexico was dealing with the Mexican Revolution. The revolution spilled over the border through cross-border supply raids, and in response President Taft sent the United States Army into the region beginning in 1911 and continuing until 1916 when the majority of the United States armed forces were stationed in the region. Texas governor Oscar Colquitt also sent the Texas Rangers into the area to keep the peace between Mexicans and Americans.

Texas Rangers with dead Mexicans after the Raid on Norias Ranch outside Kingsville, TX

The region played host to several well-known conflicts including the backlash from the Plan of San Diego, and the racially fueled violence of Texas Ranger Harry Ransom. In 1921 the United States Border Patrol came to the region with less than 10 officers. Initially the agency was focused on import and export business, especially alcohol during Prohibition in the United States, but later moved to detaining illegal aliens.

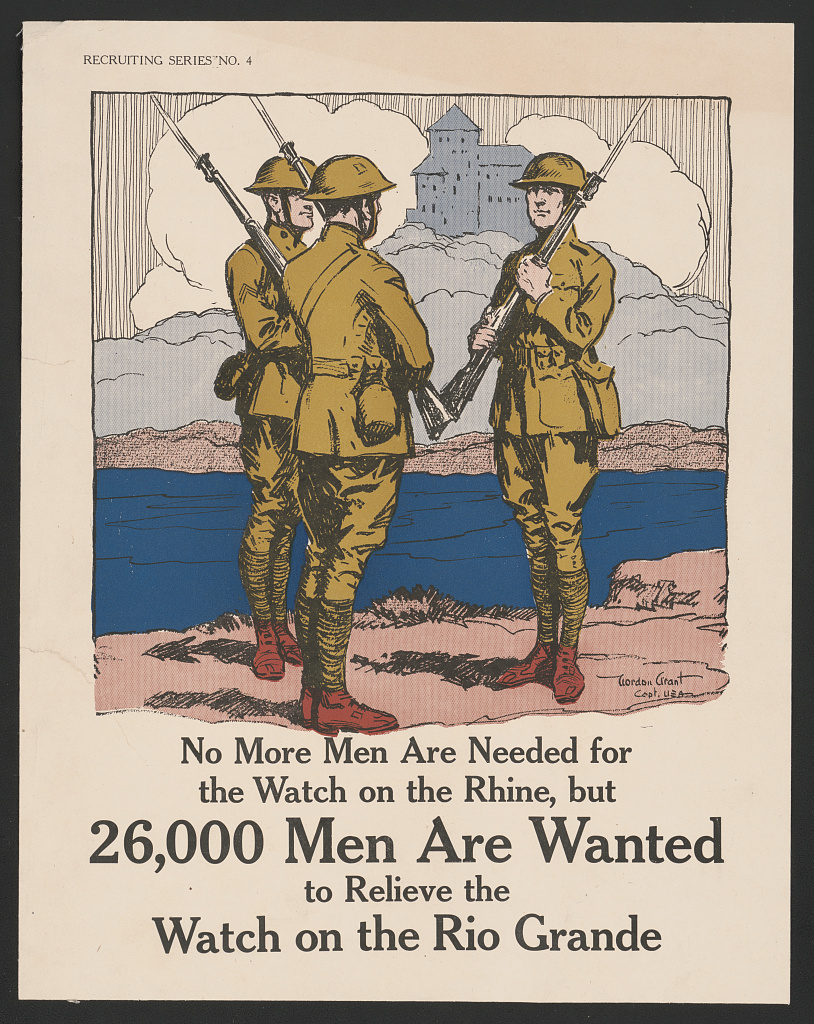
Poster recruiting men to serve in the US Army along the Rio Grande

The region had a significant increase of Border Patrol agents during World War I in conjunction with the Zimmermann Telegram. The Texas Rangers also increased their presence as law enforcement in the region with a new class of Ranger that focused on determining Tejano loyalty. They were often violent, carrying out retaliatory murders. They were never held accountable to the law even though charges were brought in the Texas senate.

There were two major military training facilities in the Valley in Brownsville and Harlingen during World War II.

=== Postwar ===
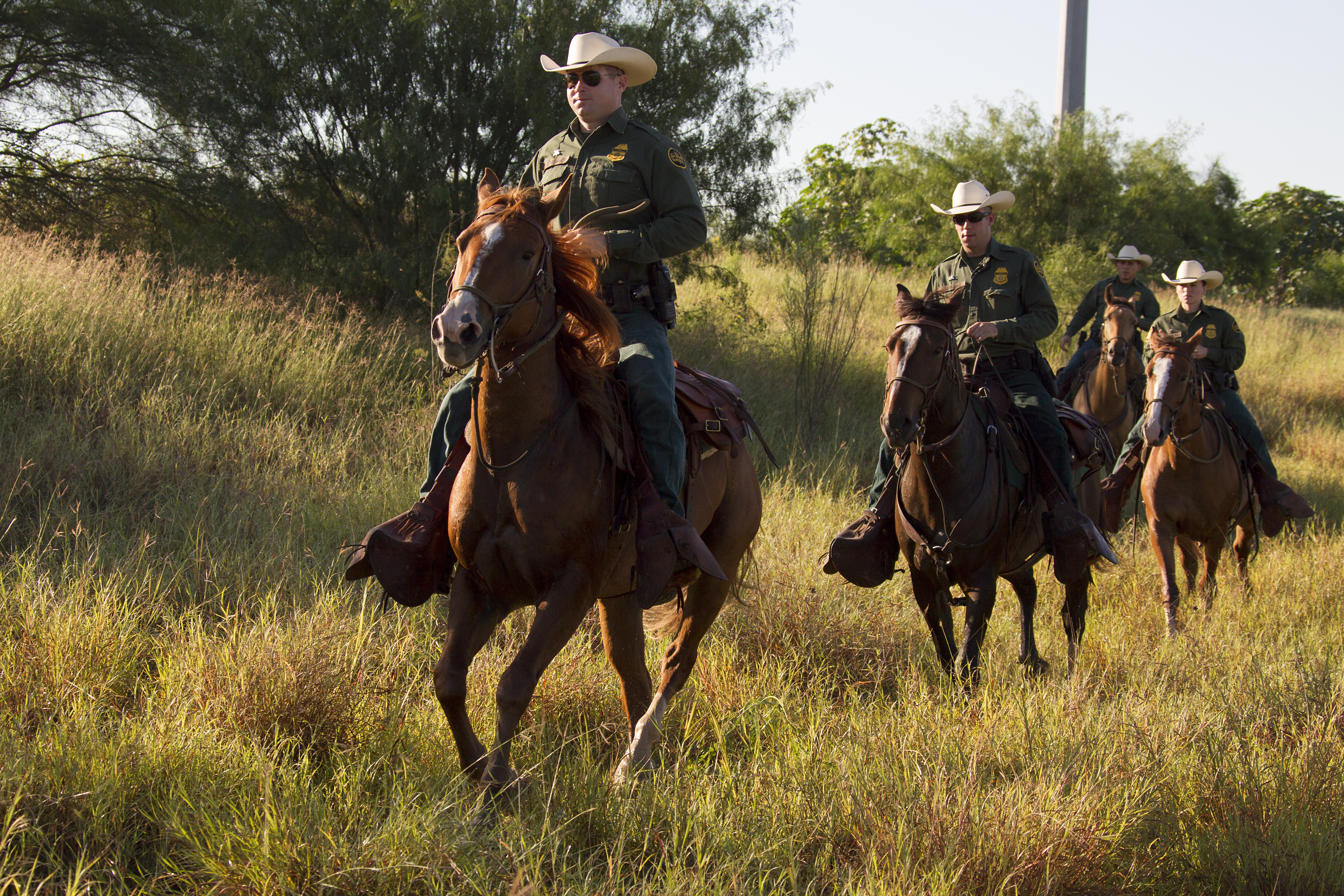
United States Border Patrol officers on horseback near McAllen, Texas

The North American Free Trade Agreement, also known as NAFTA, was established in 1994 as a trade agreement between the three North American countries, The United States, Mexico, and Canada. NAFTA was supposed to increase trade with Mexico as they lowered or eliminated tariffs on Mexican goods. Exports and imports tripled in the region and accounted for a trade surplus of $75 billion. The Rio Grande Valley benefited from NAFTA in retail, manufacturing, and transportation. According to Akinloye Akindayomi in Drug violence in Mexico and its impact on the fiscal realities of border cities in Texas: evidence from Rio Grande Valley counties, NAFTA also indirectly aids the rise in immigration and drug smuggling practices between cartels in the region, with cartels profiting with over $80 billion. The Trump Administration decided to make new accords with Mexico and Canada and replaced NAFTA with the new trade agreement, United States–Mexico–Canada Agreement (USMCA) in 2018.

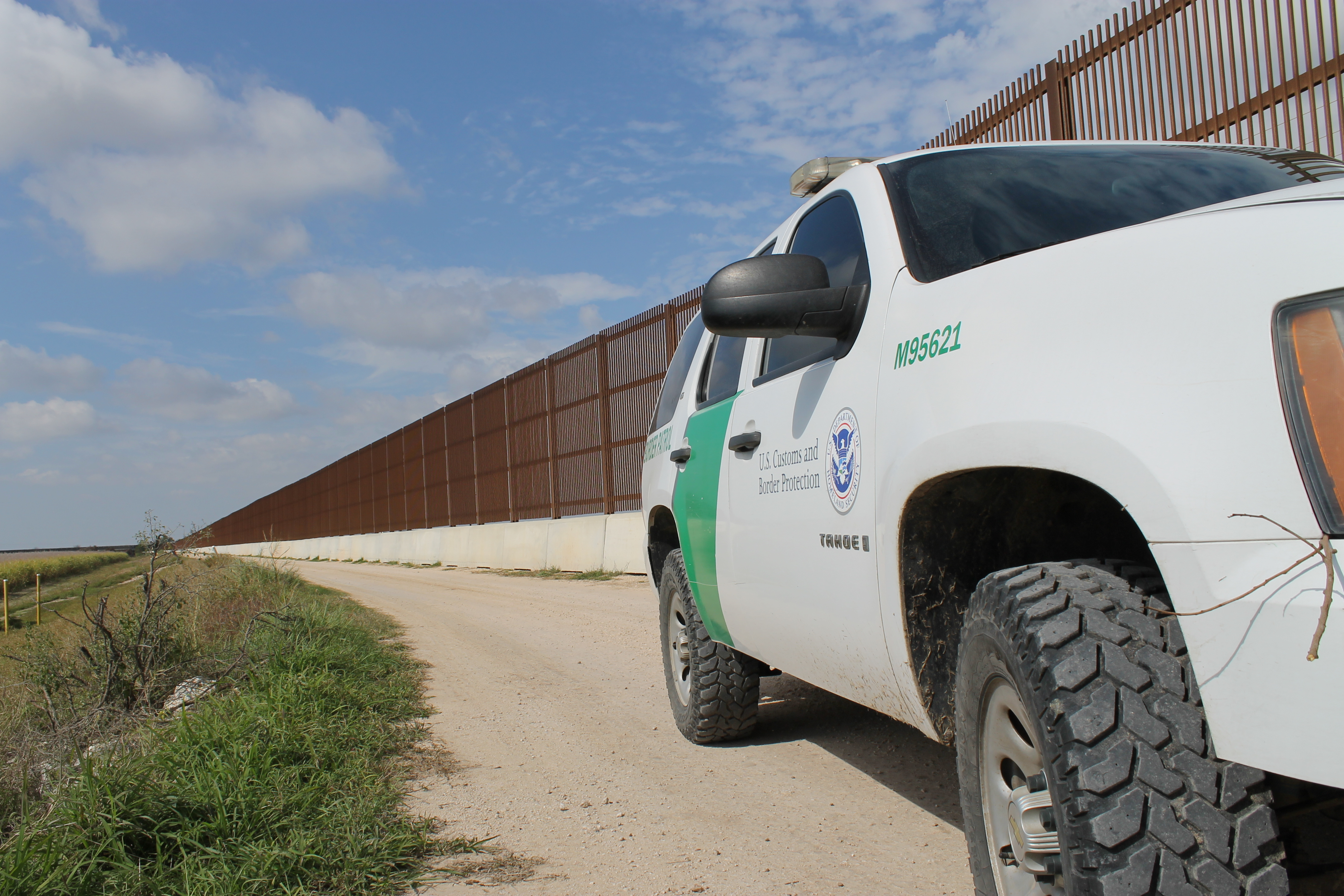
Border Patrol vehicle along a portion of the Mexico-United States border wall

After the September 11 attacks, the Customs Border Security Act of 2001 established United States Border Patrol interior checkpoints with some situated at the north end of the Rio Grande Valley.

The organization We Build the Wall built a section of the border wall in the Valley. Residents expressed concerns about the project including the site's proximity to the National Butterfly Center and the Rio Grande with its potential for seasonal flooding. The U.S. Section of the International Boundary and Water Commission ordered We Build the Wall to stop until they can review whether or not the construction violates a Treaty to resolve pending boundary differences and maintain the Rio Grande and Colorado River as the international boundary between the United States and Mexico signed in 1970.

== Geography ==
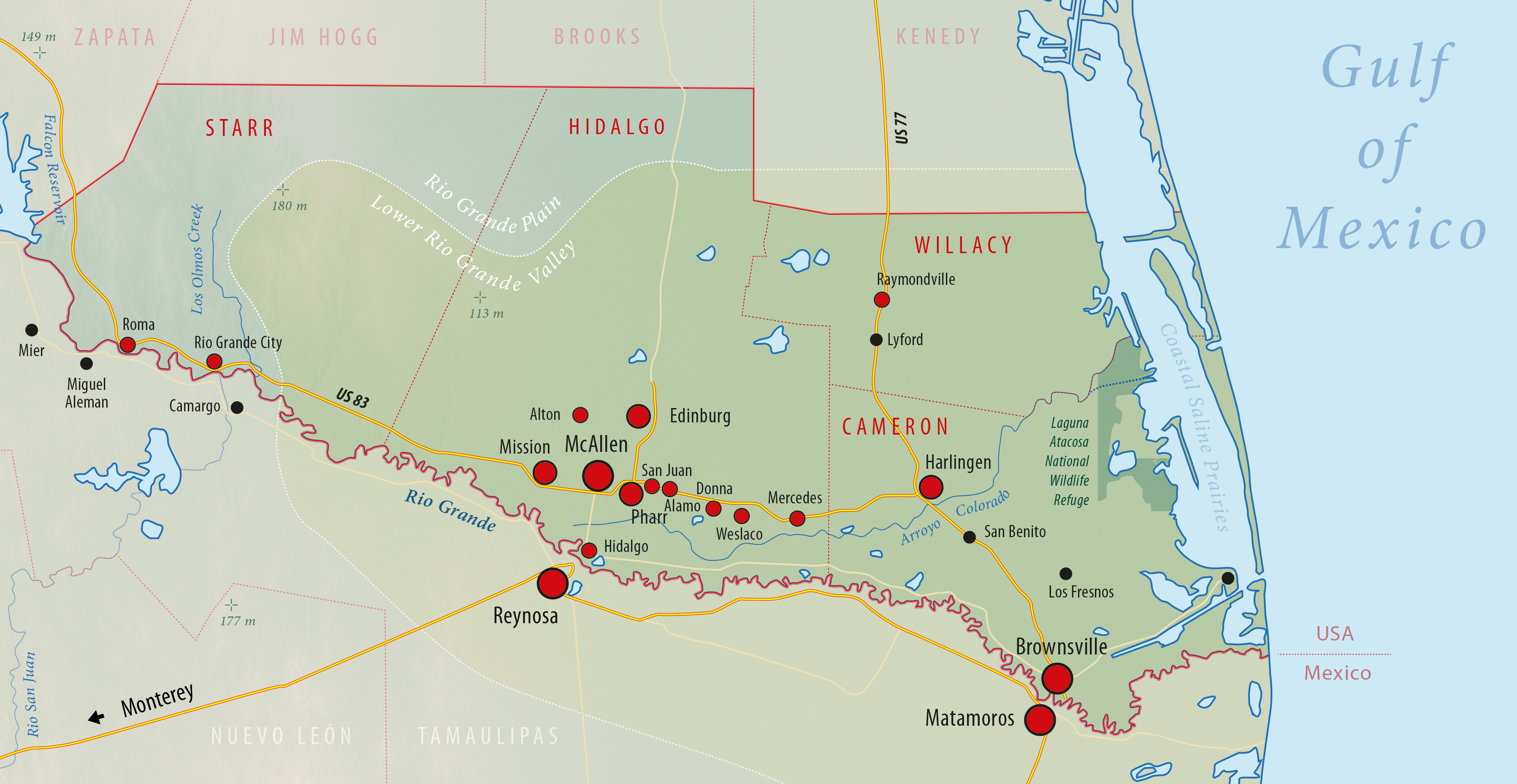
Map showing the Lower Rio Grande Valley.

The Rio Grande Valley is not a true valley, but a river delta. "Valley" is often used in the western United States to refer to a large expanse with rivers. Most such valleys, including the Rio Grande, have good agricultural production. Early 20th-century land developers, attempting to capitalize on unclaimed land, used the name "Magic Valley" to attract settlers and appeal to investors. The Rio Grande Valley is also called El Valle, the Spanish translation of "the valley", by those who live there. The region is within four counties in Texas: Starr, Hidalgo, Willacy, and Cameron.

=== Major settlements ===
The largest city is Brownsville (Cameron County), followed by McAllen (Hidalgo County). Other major cities include Harlingen, San Benito, Edinburg, Mission, Rio Grande City, Raymondville, Weslaco, Hidalgo, Pharr, and Starbase.

== Demographics ==
As of 2025, the U.S. Census Bureau estimated the population of the Rio Grande Valley at 1,441,785. Hidalgo County has the largest population with an estimate of 921,319. Cameron County has the second-highest population estimated at 433,946. Starr County has the third-largest population estimated at 66,319. Willacy County has the fourth-largest population estimated at 19,971.

According to the U.S. Census Bureau, in 2020, 89 percent of Cameron County, 92 percent of Hidalgo County, 97 percent of Starr County, and 88 percent of Willacy County are Hispanic. The area is generally bilingual in English and Spanish, resulting in Spanglish creole, due to the region's diverse socioeconomic relationships.

=== Colonias ===
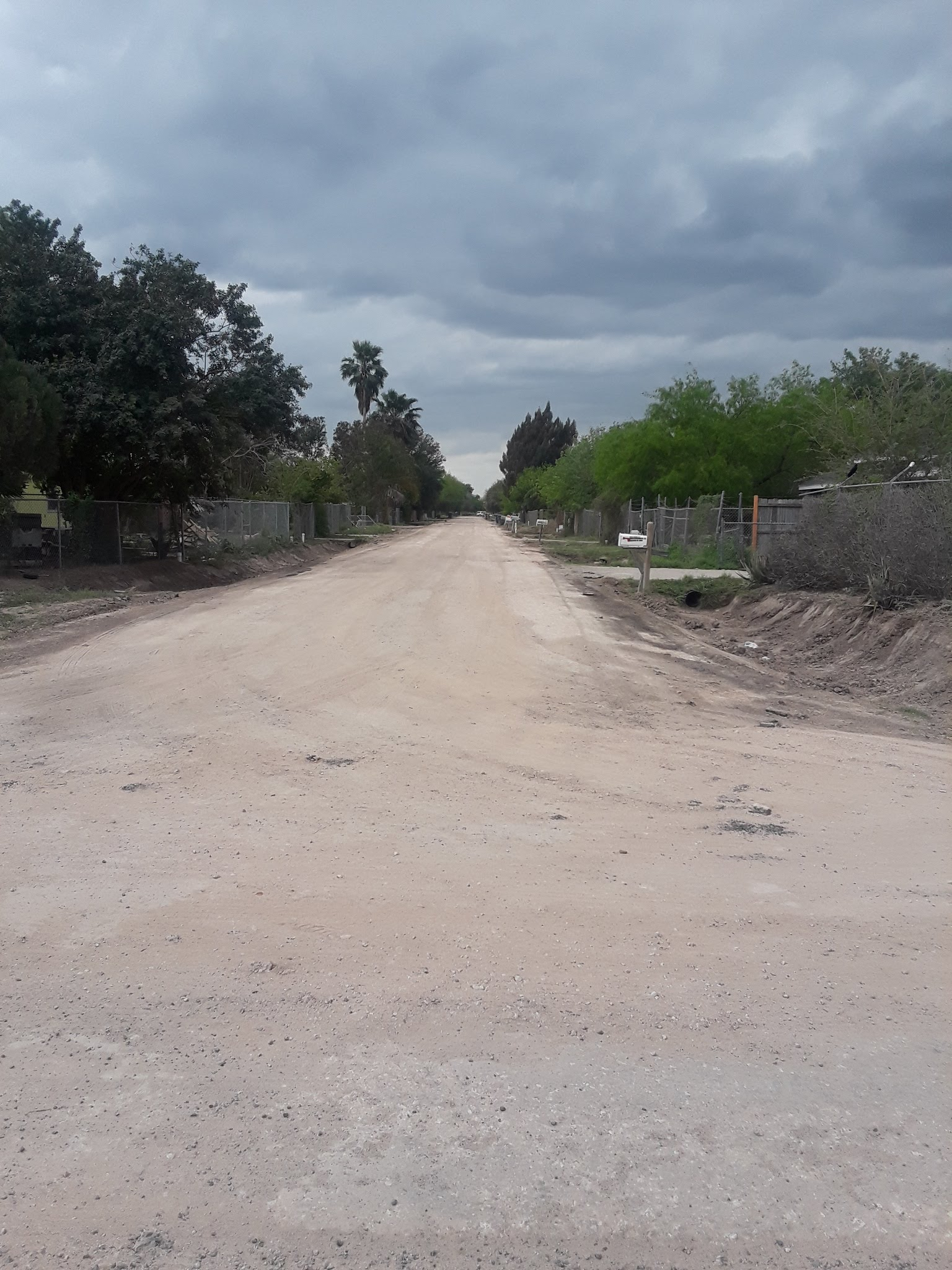
A dirt road in a colonia near Edinburg, Texas

Like several other American Southwest border areas, the RGV has numerous colonias—unincorporated tracts of land of marginal agricultural value that have become low-income slums with minimal services and infrastructure.

The major metropolitan areas in the Rio Grande Valley are surrounded by smaller rural communities called colonias. These communities are primarily poor and Hispanic. The areas often lack basic services like sanitation and sewage, and suffer from flooding. Many of these colonias are mixes of mobile homes and self-constructed houses owned by the residents. The Bracero program enacted in the 1940s allowed Mexicans to cross the border and work in the agricultural fields. Most worked in the Rio Grande Valley, and due to a shortage of affordable houses, developers started selling them land in unincorporated areas; these clusters of homes over time became what are now known as colonias. According to the Housing Assistance Council, a nonprofit organization that tracks rural housing, approximately 1.6 million people live in 1,500 recognized colonias alongside the Mexican border.

=== Language use ===
The residents of the Lower Rio Grande Valley are generally bilingual in English and Spanish often mixing into Spanglish depending on demographics and context. Government statistics for the region are often underreported due to underlying immigration issues.

The Spanish language plays an important role in all aspects of life. In 1982 a statistically significant majority of people in the Rio Grande Valley spoke Spanish. People speak Spanish to communicate in all aspects of life including business, government, and at home.

2017 United States Census American Community Survey estimates
	Cameron County	Hidalgo County	Starr County	Willacy County
Population 5 years and older	384,007	759,143	56,972	20,442
Speaks English only	102,074	119,489	2,072	8,252
Language other than English	281,933	639,654	54,900	12,190
Spanish	278,451	631,638	54,838	12,005
Other Indo-European languages	1,302	2,126	3	155
Asian and Pacific Islander languages	1,511	5,460	53	22
Other languages	669	430	6	8

People often prefer Spanish to English when interacting with government officials as seen in the response to the region's 2018 flooding.

=== "Winter Texans" ===
A large seasonal influx occurs of "Winter Texans" – people who migrate south to escape snowy climes.

=== Religion ===
Catholicism has been present since the colonial era, but has increasingly lost ground to Protestantism and irreligion.

The Basilica of the National Shrine of Our Lady of San Juan del Valle is a major shrine in San Juan, Texas .

Santa Muerte, a new religious movement, has a notable following in the Valley. There has been public outcry against followers erecting shrines throughout the Valley. In 2015, a Santa Muerte statue was involved with a bomb scare in San Benito, Texas. This followed the desecration of a Santa Muerte statue in the San Benito Municipal Cemetery in January of the same year.

Other major Christian sects present include denominational or nondenominational Protestants. There are also 26 congregations of the Church of Jesus Christ of Latter-day Saints with about 17,000 members. Muslim, Jewish, Hindu, Buddhist, Sikh, and Baháʼí Faith communities thrive in the Rio Grande Valley.

== Culture ==
The area is largely bilingual and bicultural, according to Texas Highways; in 2024 nearly 90% of the population identified as Hispanic. Mexican cuisine and Tejano cuisine are popular in the area. Green spaghetti or espagueti verde, a Mexican style of spaghetti with roasted poblano cream sauce, is a common celebration dish little known in the United States outside the Rio Grande Valley. The local style of barbecue is barbacoa. Brownsville's Vera's Backyard BBQ is a notable barbacoa restaurant.

== Climate ==
The Lower Rio Grande Valley experiences a warm and fair climate that brings visitors from many surrounding areas. Temperature extremes range from triple digits during the summer months to freezing during the winter. While the Valley has seen severe cold events before, such as the 2004 Christmas snow storm and 2021 cold snap, the region rarely experiences temperatures at or below freezing, especially by the coast, which transitions into a Tropical climate.

The region's proximity to the Gulf of Mexico makes it a target for hurricanes. Though not impacted as frequently as other areas of the Gulf Coast of the United States, the Valley has experienced major hurricanes in the past. Hurricanes that have made landfall in or near the area include Hurricane Beulah (1967), Hurricane Allen (1980), Hurricane Gilbert, Hurricane Bret, Hurricane Dolly (2008), Hurricane Alex (2010), and Hurricane Hanna (2020). Having an especially flat terrain, the Valley usually experiences the catastrophic effects of tropical cyclones in the form of flooding.

== Tourism ==
The Lower Rio Grande Valley encompasses landmarks that attract tourists. Popular destinations include Laguna Atascosa National Wildlife Refuge, Santa Ana National Wildlife Refuge, Bentsen-Rio Grande Valley State Park, South Padre Island, Brazos Island, and the Port Isabel Lighthouse.

The Valley is a popular waypoint for tourists visiting northeast Mexico. Popular destinations across the border and Rio Grande include: Matamoros, Nuevo Progreso, Río Bravo, and Reynosa, all located in the Mexican state of Tamaulipas.

The region also attracts tourists from the Mexican states of Tamaulipas, Nuevo León, Coahuila, and Mexico, D.F. (México City).

=== Places of historical interest ===
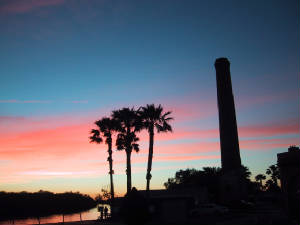
The First Lift Station in Mission, Texas once provided water for irrigating the crops of the early Rio Grande Valley.

- Basilica of the National Shrine of Our Lady of San Juan del Valle
- First Lift Station
- Laguna Atascosa National Wildlife Refuge
- Santa Ana National Wildlife Refuge
- Hugh Ramsey Nature Park
- Los Ebanos Ferry, last hand-operated ferry on the Rio Grande
- La Lomita Historic District
- Fort Brown
- Palo Alto Battlefield National Historic Site
- Resaca de la Palma
- Rancho de Carricitos
- USMC War Memorial original plaster working model, located on the campus of the Marine Military Academy in Harlingen
- Museum of South Texas History, originally the County Court House and Jail, built in the late 19th century
- Battle of Palmito Ranch, location of the last battle of the Civil War
- Brownsville Raid
- Battle of Resaca de la Palma

== Economy ==
The Valley is historically reliant on agribusiness and tourism. Cotton, grapefruit, sorghum, maize, and sugarcane are its leading crops, and the region is the center of citrus production and the most important area of vegetable production in the State of Texas. Over the last several decades, the emergence of maquiladoras (factories or fabrication plants) has caused a surge of industrial development along the border, while international bridges have allowed Mexican nationals to shop, sell, and do business in the border cities along the Rio Grande. The geographic inclusion of South Padre Island also drives tourism, particularly during the Spring Break season, as its subtropical climate keeps temperatures warm year-round. During the winter months, many retirees (commonly referred to as "Winter Texans") arrive to enjoy the warm weather, access to pharmaceuticals and healthcare in Mexican border crossings such as Nuevo Progreso. There is a substantial health-care industry with major hospitals and many clinics and private practices in Brownsville, Harlingen, and McAllen.

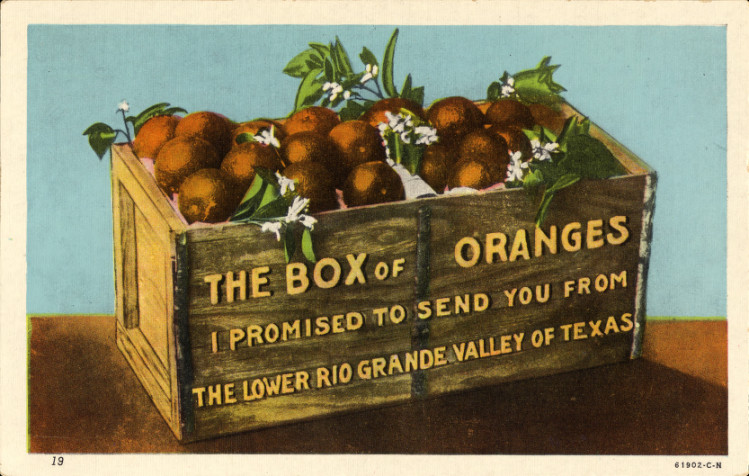
Box of Oranges, from the Lower Rio Grande Valley, Texas (postcard, c. 1912–1924)

Texas is the third largest producer of citrus fruit in the United States, the majority of which is grown in the Rio Grande Valley. Grapefruit make up over 70% of the Valley citrus crop, which also includes orange, tangerine, tangelo and Meyer lemon production each Winter.

One minor professional sports team plays in the Rio Grande Valley: The Rio Grande Valley Vipers (basketball). Defunct teams that previously played in the region include: the Edinburg Roadrunners (baseball), La Fiera FC (indoor soccer), Rio Grande Valley Ocelots FC (soccer), Rio Grande Valley WhiteWings (baseball), Rio Grande Valley Killer Bees (ice hockey), Rio Grande Valley Sol (indoor football) and the Rio Grande Valley FC Toros (soccer)

One of the Valley's major tourist attractions is the semi-tropical wildlife. Birds and butterflies attract a large number of visitors every year all throughout the entire region. Ecotourism is a major economic force in the Rio Grande Valley.

== Transportation ==
The Rio Grande Valley is served by three commercial airports: Brownsville South Padre Island International Airport in Brownsville, Texas, Valley International Airport in Harlingen, Texas, and McAllen Miller International Airport in McAllen, Texas. American Airlines and United Airlines provide service to all three airports, with Avelo Air also providing service to Brownsville South Padre Island International Airport, Allegiant Air also providing service to McAllen Miller International Airport, Southwest Airlines, Sun Country Airlines and Delta Air Lines also providing service to Valley International Airport.

There are several bus lines that run through the Lower Rio Grande Valley including Metro Connect (McAllen), McAllen Paratransit, McAllen Metro Services, Brownsville Metro/ADA Paratransit Service Island Metro (South Padre Island), and Greyhound Lines.

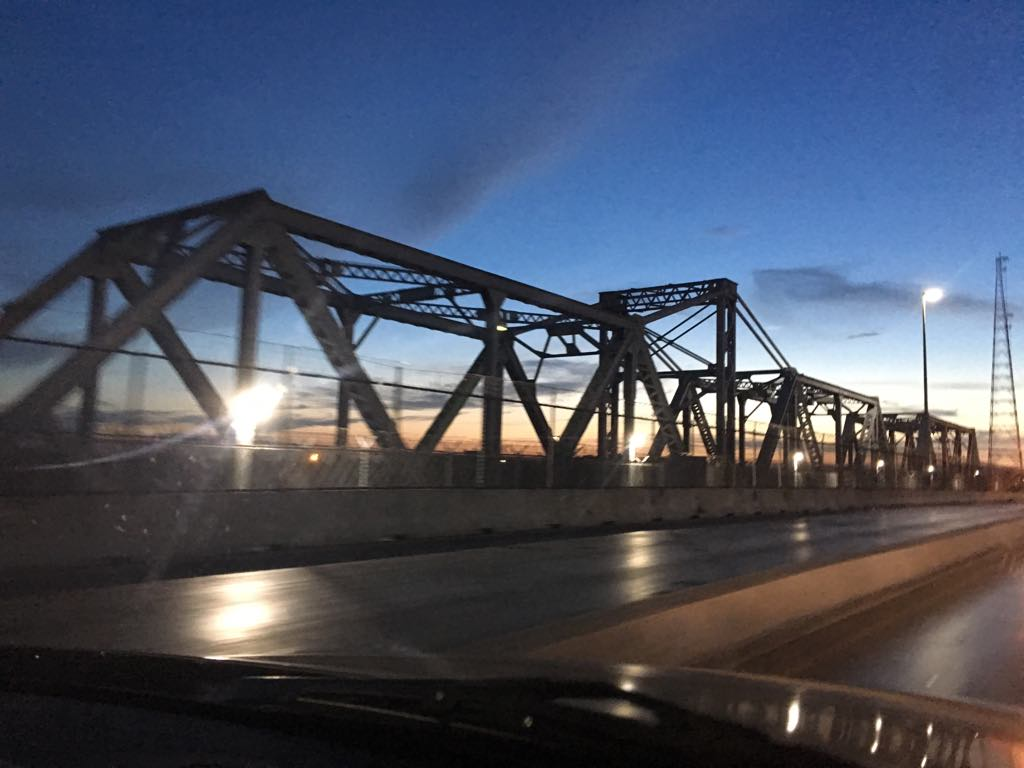
The Brownsville & Matamoros International Bridge

The Interstate Highway System in the United States is well developed in the Lower Rio Grande Valley, with Interstate 2 and Interstate 69C connecting Brownsville, Hidalgo, McAllen, Raymondville, Edinburg, Pharr, and Laredo.

Freight trains run between Harlingen, Mission, Edinburg, and Santa Rosa connecting to the Union Pacific Railroad.

Sea trade runs through the deepwater seaport, the Port of Brownsville and the Foreign Trade Zone 62. As of 2025, the Port also features an export terminal for liquid natural gas under construction, Rio Grande LNG, with a competing LNG export terminal, the Texas LNG project, planned to commence construction in the near future.

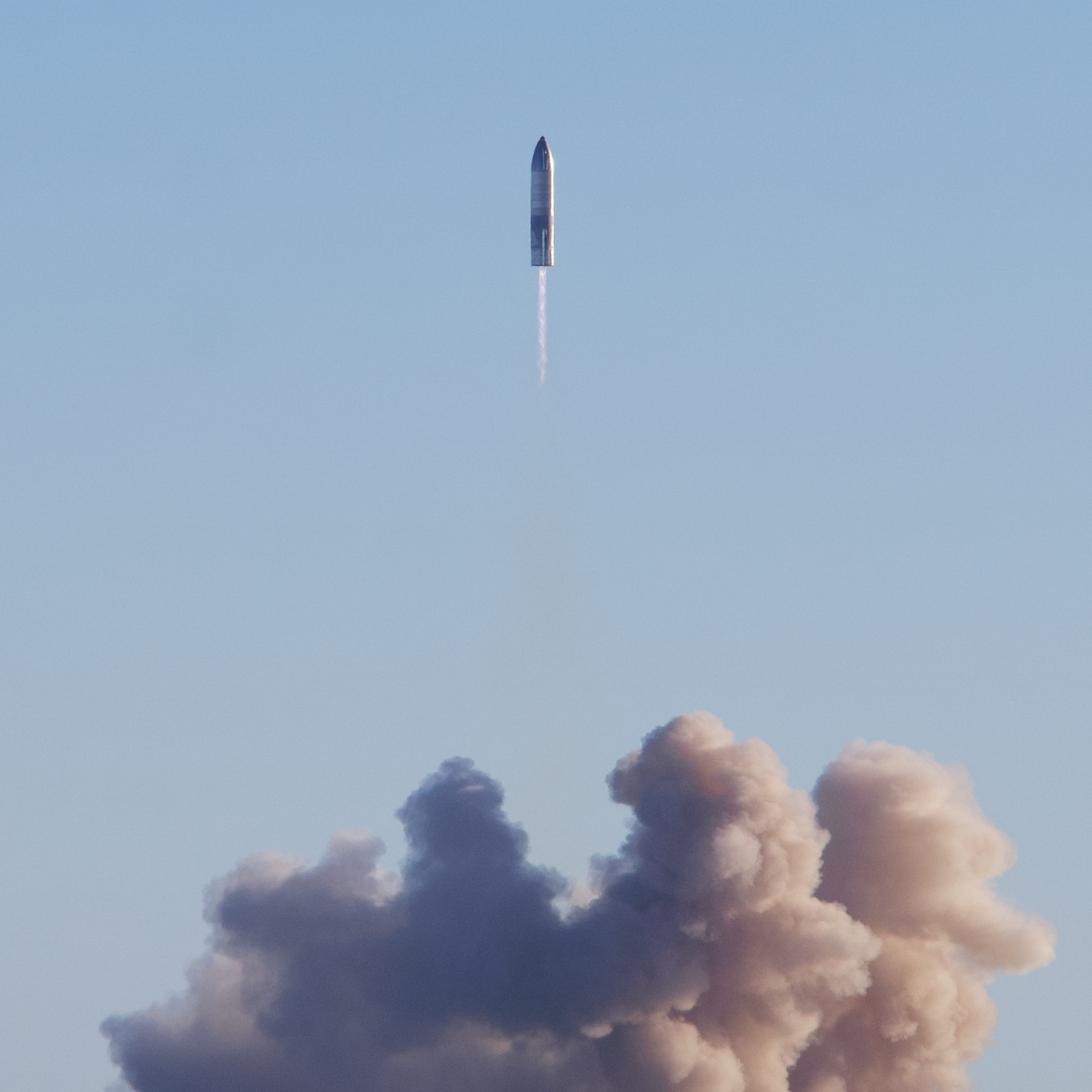
Starship SN8 launching from SpaceX South Texas launch site

SpaceX South Texas launch site is located near Brownsville.

== Politics ==
United States presidential election results for the Rio Grande Valley
Year	Republican		Democratic		Third party(ies)	
Year	No.	%	No.	%	No.	%
1912	445	9.17%	4,125	85.00%	283	5.83%
1916	805	19.52%	3,250	78.81%	69	1.67%
1920	2,115	38.07%	3,382	60.87%	59	1.06%
1924	2,395	24.56%	6,950	71.27%	407	4.17%
1928	8,368	48.39%	8,897	51.45%	27	0.16%
1932	5,045	20.88%	18,837	77.98%	275	1.14%
1936	5,818	26.12%	15,960	71.65%	498	2.24%
1940	9,065	36.38%	15,789	63.37%	63	0.25%
1944	10,211	37.52%	15,406	56.61%	1,595	5.86%
1948	11,764	36.78%	19,439	60.77%	786	2.46%
1952	32,185	60.21%	21,189	39.64%	79	0.15%
1956	27,425	54.23%	22,621	44.73%	525	1.04%
1960	25,465	40.38%	37,239	59.05%	360	0.57%
1964	23,002	34.05%	44,374	65.70%	169	0.25%
1968	28,831	38.11%	41,665	55.08%	5,147	6.80%
1972	48,442	56.83%	36,410	42.71%	390	0.46%
1976	37,853	35.28%	68,661	64.00%	772	0.72%
1980	51,233	42.92%	65,571	54.93%	2,559	2.14%
1984	68,602	46.46%	78,625	53.25%	435	0.29%
1988	56,479	37.02%	95,425	62.54%	671	0.44%
1992	49,798	30.74%	91,667	56.59%	20,523	12.67%
1996	44,959	29.21%	101,327	65.84%	7,605	4.94%
2000	69,801	39.52%	104,327	59.06%	2,505	1.42%
2004	90,493	45.80%	106,300	53.80%	789	0.40%
2008	69,287	31.25%	150,424	67.84%	2,033	0.92%
2012	68,927	29.31%	161,804	68.80%	4,433	1.89%
2016	81,885	29.00%	190,922	67.62%	9,544	3.38%
2020	150,247	41.95%	204,493	57.10%	3,392	0.95%
2024	184,094	51.77%	168,310	47.34%	3,164	0.89%

The region is represented by Ted Cruz and John Cornyn in the United States Senate and by Monica De La Cruz, Vicente Gonzalez, and Henry Cuellar in the United States House of Representatives.

In the twenty-first century, the dominance of agribusiness has caused political issues, as jurisdictional disputes regarding water rights have caused tension between farmers on both sides of the U.S.-Mexico border. Scholars, including Mexican political scientist Armand Peschard-Sverdrup, have argued that this tension has created the need for a re-developed strategic transnational water management. Some have declared the disputes tantamount to a "war" over diminishing natural resources. Climatologists believe water scarcity in the Valley will only increase as climate change alters the precipitation patterns of the region.

The Lower Rio Grande Valley has historically been one of the most strongly Democratic regions in the country, having only briefly voted Republican during the 1950s Eisenhower years and the 1972 landslide election of Republican Richard Nixon. Continued Democratic dominance would depend on maintaining the loyalty of Latino voters, who make up 91.5% of the population.

During the 2024 United States presidential election, the GOP made large inroads, causing loyalties to shift. Latino men, particularly young men, rural Latinos, the growing number of Latino evangelical Protestants, devout Catholics, socially conservative, pro-life voters, and working class-blue collar voters without a college degree joined highly educated, urban Latino and white voters in supporting the Republican Party at majority levels. The state GOP successfully galvanized the majority Latino region against Democrats on several hot-button social issues, namely gender identity and transgender-related concerns. The Lower Rio Grande Valley, like Texas itself, is socially conservative. Over 60% of voters outright reject a variety of transgender rights. GOP Spanish ads denigrating pronouns, denouncing gender-theory curriculum, opposing gender-affirming care for minors, and "protecting girls' sports and locker rooms" by banning transgender athletes in sports flooded the campaign trail. These sentiments are now influencing local races in the region and across Texas, signaling a new source of Republican strength. Economically, the GOP emphasized strong support for the state's oil and gas industry, which is 33% Latino. Other ideas communicated through the campaign trail were lowering taxes and supporting entrepreneurs and small business owners within the Latino community who signaled they trusted Donald Trump to manage the economy over the Democrats. Pundits also noted the Trump campaign was able to build much-needed trust in the Latino community for Trump's immigration plans, often criticizing illegal immigration and asylum-seekers, which polls showed Latinos began to believe his rhetoric was about "other people" not "me."

In 2016, Trump won only 29 percent of the region's vote, an 80-year low for Republicans. However, shocking pundits in 2020, he significantly strengthened the Republican vote in the Rio Grande Valley, reducing Democrats' winning margins from 38.6 in 2016 to 15.1 in 2020 and then outright winning the region in 2024 by 4.4 points, ultimately a 43-point shift from 8 years prior. Cruz on the same ballot lost the region by 5 points, a significant improvement from losing 2–1 in 2018.

However, during the 2026 United States midterm elections, voters in the Rio Grande Valley swung hard to the Democratic Party, with Starr County shifting 75 points towards Democratic candidate James Talarico in the Senate election, with the Valley altogether voting 74% Democratic. Issues that led to this change included the economy, inflation, rising fuel prices caused by the 2026 Iran war, and deportation in the second Trump administration. Voters also flipped Texas's 15th congressional district, even after it was gerrymandered by the Texas government in order to be more favorable to the GOP.

== Education ==
Historically, education has posed significant challenges to schools in the region. Schools in the early 1920s through the 1940s were racially segregated in the Rio Grande Valley. In 1940 a study showed the need for improvement in cultural differentiation of instruction. The Texas Supreme Court in Del Rio ISD v. Salvatierra reinforced the racial segregation. In 1968, President Lyndon B. Johnson signed the Bilingual Education Act, helping students whose second language was English. The Act gave financial assistance to local schools to create bilingual programs, enabling Mexican students to integrate white schools. The area, like many others, had a hard time integrating. Texas still has the bilingual program, while states like California, Arizona, and Massachusetts, have removed the bill and passed similar propositions stating that students would only be taught in English. The bilingual program in the Rio Grande Valley is still in effect, especially with Deferred Action for Childhood Arrivals students in the area.

Colleges and universities located in the Rio Grande Valley include:

- Texas A&M Health Science Center, School of Public Health – McAllen
- Texas A&M University Higher Education Center at McAllen
- University of Texas Rio Grande Valley – entered into full operation in 2015 with the merger of the University of Texas at Brownsville and the University of Texas–Pan American
- University of Texas Rio Grande Valley School of Medicine
- Texas Southmost College
- Texas State Technical College
- South Texas College
- University of Texas Health Science Center – Regional Academic Health Center

== Sports ==
Club	Sport	League	Venue	Capacity
Rio Grande Valley Vipers	Basketball	NBA G League	Bert Ogden Arena	9,000
RGV Barracudas FC	Indoor Soccer	MASL	Payne Arena	6,800
UTRGV Basketball Men	NCAA Division I basketball	WAC	UTRGV Fieldhouse	2,500
Rio Grande Valley Dorados	Arena football	afa	Traveling Team	

=== Defunct ===
Club	Sport	League
Rio Grande Valley Dorados	Arena football	af2 (2004–09)
Rio Grande Valley Magic	Arena football	SIFL (2011); LSFL (2012)
Rio Grande Valley Sol	Arena football	LSFL (2014); XLIF (2015)
Hidalgo La Fiera	Arena soccer	MASL (2012–14)
Edinburg Roadrunners	Baseball	Texas–Louisiana League (2001); Central Baseball League (2002–05); United League Baseball (2006–10); North American League (2011–12)
Rio Grande Valley Giants	Baseball	Texas League (1960–61)
Rio Grande Valley WhiteWings	Baseball	Texas–Louisiana League (1994–2001); Central Baseball League (2002–03); United League Baseball (2006–10); North American League (2011–12)
Texas Thunder	Baseball	United League Baseball (2009–10); North American League (2011–12); United League Baseball (2013)
Rio Grande Valley Killer Bees	Ice hockey	CHL (2003–12)
Rio Grande Valley Killer Bees	Ice hockey	NAHL (2013–15)
Rio Grande Valley Killer Bees	Ice hockey	USA Central Hockey League (2018)
Rio Grande Valley Bravos FC	Soccer	PDL (2008–2010)
Rio Grande Valley FC Toros	Soccer	USLC (2015–2023)

== Hospitals ==
- Cornerstone Regional Hospital, Edinburg, Texas
- Edinburg Children's Hospital, Edinburg, Texas
- Edinburg Regional Medical Center, Edinburg, Texas
- Driscoll Children's Hospital Rio Grande Valley
- Doctors Hospital at Renaissance, Edinburg, Texas
- Harlingen Medical Center, Harlingen, Texas
- McAllen Heart Hospital, McAllen, Texas
- McAllen Medical Center, McAllen, Texas
- Rio Grande Regional Hospital, McAllen, Texas
- Rio Grande State Hospital, Harlingen, Texas
- Solara Hospital, Harlingen, Texas
- VA Health Care Center at Harlingen. Harlingen, Texas
- Valley Baptist Medical Center, Harlingen, Texas
- Valley Baptist Medical Center, Brownsville, Texas
- Valley Regional Medical Center, Brownsville, Texas
- Knapp Medical Center, Weslaco, Texas
- Mission Regional Medical Center, Mission, Texas

== Media ==
=== Magazines ===
- The Go Guide (published by Above Group Advertising Agency)
- Rio Grande Magazine
- Viva el Valle
- RGV Drives Magazine (published by MAT Media Solutions)
- RGVision Magazine (published by RGVision Media)

=== Newspapers ===
- Valley Town Crier – owned by Gatehouse Media
- The Edinburg Review – owned by Gatehouse Media
- Valley Bargain Book – owned by Gatehouse Media
- El Periódico USA
- El Nuevo Heraldo – owned by AIM Media Texas
- Mega Doctor News
- Texas Border Business
- The Brownsville Herald – owned by AIM Media Texas
- The Island Breeze – owned by AIM Media Texas
- The Monitor – owned by AIM Media Texas
- Valley Morning Star – owned by AIM Media Texas
- Valleywood Magazine – owned by Valleywood Publications
- The Donna News – owned by Valleywood Publications
- Weslaco World – owned by Valleywood Publications
- La Feria Journal – owned by Valleywood Publications
- South Padre Island Post – owned by Valleywood Publications
- Edinburg Daily Review – owned by Valleywood Publications
- The Alamo News – owned by Valleywood Publications
- Pharr Press – owned by Valleywood Publications
- Harlingen Times – owned by Valleywood Publications
- Progreso Gazette – owned by Valleywood Publications

=== Television ===
- KGBT-TV/DT channel 4, Antenna TV/MyNetworkTV Affiliate
- KRGV-TV/DT Channel 5 News, ABC Affiliate
- KVEO-TV/DT NBC 23/CBS 4 (DT-2), NBC/CBS Affiliate
- KCWT-CD 21, The CW Affiliate with PBS on DT4
- KTFV-CD 32, UniMás Affiliate
- KFXV TV/DT 60, FOX Affiliate
- KLUJ-TV/DT 44, TBN Affiliate
- KTLM-TV/DT 40, Telemundo Affiliate
- KNVO TV/DT 48, Univision Affiliate
- KMBH-LD 67, Fox 2 News, Fox Affiliate
- XERV-TDT 9.1 / XHTAM-TDT 2.1 Las Estrellas, Televisa
- XHAB-TDT 8.1 Televisa Tamaulipas, Televisa
- XHOR-TDT 7.1 Azteca 7, TV Azteca
- XHREY-TDT / XHMTA-TDT 1.1 Azteca Uno, TV Azteca
- XHVTV-TDT 6.1 Canal 6, Multimedios
- XHCTRM-TDT 13.1 Imagen Televisión, Grupo Imagen *El Valle tv.online platform YouTube

=== Radio ===
- KBFM Wild 104 (Hip Hop/Top 40 – IHeart Media)
- XEEW-FM Los 40 Principales 97.7 (Top 40 Spanish/English)
- KBTQ 96.1 Exitos (Spanish Oldies) Univision
- KBUC Super Tejano 102.1 (Tejano)
- KCAS 91.5 FM (Christian, Teaching/Preaching/Music)
- KESO 92.7 KESO (Classic Hits)
- KFRQ Q94.5 The Rock (Classic Rock) (All Rock All The Time)
- KGBT-FM 98.5 FM (Regional Mexican) Univision
- KHKZ Kiss FM 105.5 & 106.3 (Hot Adult Contemporary)
- KIRT 1580 AM Radio Imagen (Variety, Spanish contemporary)
- KIWW (Spanish)
- KJAV Ultra 104.9 Sonamos Differente (Spanish AC & English HAC) (AC)
- KKPS Fuego 99.5 (Spanish Hot AC (International hits)
- KJJF/KHID 88.9/88.1 Religious (Relevant Radio)
- KNVO-FM La Suavecita 101.1 (Spanish Hits)
- KQXX Kiss FM 105.5 & 106.3 (Hot Adult Contemporary, simulcast of KHKZ – IHeart Media)
- KTEX 100.3 (Mainstream Country – IHeart Media)
- KURV 710 AM Heritage Talk Radio (part of the BMP family of stations)
- KVLY 107.9 RGV FM (AC) (More Hits, More Variety)
- KVMV 96.9 FM (Christian, Contemporary Music) World Radio Network
- KVNS 1700AM (Fox Sports Radio – IHeart Media)
- KYWW 1530 La Tremenda (Univision)
- XHRYA-FM 90.9 Mas Music (Spanish/English Mix)

== Notable people ==
Notable people who were born, lived, or died in the Rio Grande Valley include:

- David V. Aguilar (Chief Border Patrol Agent, United States Border Patrol)
- Cristela Alonzo (comedian, actress, writer, producer from San Juan, Texas)
- Micaela Alvarez (federal judge)
- Abraham Ancer (professional golfer, Olympian)
- Natalia Anciso (contemporary artist)
- Gloria E. Anzaldúa (writer, poet, philosopher)
- Ramón Ayala (singer)
- Cathy Baker (television performer)
- Edgar Barrera (songwriter, producer, Grammy Award Winner; McAllen, Texas)
- Lloyd Bentsen (U.S. Secretary of the Treasury; U.S. Senator; 1988 vice-presidential candidate)
- James Carlos Blake (novelist)
- Harlon Block (Iwo Jima flag raiser)
- William S. Burroughs (writer; his time as a farmer in the Valley in Pharr, Texas, is briefly chronicled in his books Junky and Queer)
- Pedro Cano (Medal of Honor recipient)
- Rolando Cantú (football player)
- Raúl Castillo (actor)
- Chuck Charnichart, restaurateur
- Thomas Haden Church (actor)
- Maria D'Luz (singer, songwriter, pianist, recording artist, musician)
- Monica De La Cruz (first Republican woman to represent Texas's 15th congressional district from Brownsville, Texas)
- Kika de la Garza (U.S. Representative)
- Freddy Fender (actor, musician, lyricist)
- Mike Fossum (astronaut)
- Grupo Frontera (regional Mexican band from Edinburg, Texas)
- Reynaldo Guerra Garza (United States Court of Appeals for the Fifth Circuit judge)
- Roberto Garza (football player)
- Tony Garza (U.S. Ambassador to Mexico)
- Xavier Garza (author and illustrator)
- Alfredo C. Gonzalez (Medal of Honor recipient, U.S. Marine veteran)
- Matt Gonzalez (2008 vice-presidential candidate; former president of the Board of Supervisors of San Francisco, California)
- Raquel Gonzalez (wrestler)
- Bill Haley (musician)
- Catherine Hardwicke (writer, film director-producer)
- Gina Hinojosa (Governor-elect of Texas)
- Rolando Hinojosa (author)
- Rubén Hinojosa (U.S. Representative)
- Esteban Jordan (accordionist)
- Kris Kristofferson (musician, actor, songwriter)
- Bobby Lackey (college football player; Weslaco, Texas)
- Tom Landry (American football coach, Mission, Texas)
- José M. López (Medal of Honor recipient)
- Domingo Martinez (author)
- Narciso Martínez ("father of conjunto music" from La Paloma, Texas)
- Rachel McLish (Ms. Olympia; actress)
- Roy Mitchell-Cárdenas (musician)
- Jack Morava (mathematician)
- Bobby Morrow (Olympic gold medalist)
- Elon Musk (founder and CEO of SpaceX, moved into a $50,000 rental home in Boca Chica)
- Billy Gene Pemelton (1964 Olympian)
- Bobby Pulido (singer, songwriter, guitarist, actor, and U.S. representative-elect from Edinburg, Texas)
- Major Samuel Ringgold (father of modern artillery)
- Charles M. Robinson III (author)
- Valente Rodriguez (actor)
- Ricardo Sanchez (U.S. Army lieutenant general; ground forces commander in Iraq)
- Julian Schnabel (filmmaker)
- Siggno (American norteño/tejano band formed in Santa Rosa, Texas)
- Adela Sloss Vento
- Merced Solis, aka Tito Santana (wrestler)
- Nick Stahl (actor)
- Emeraude Toubia (actress)
- Filemon Bartolome Vela (federal judge)
- Eric Miles Williamson (novelist, literary critic, professor)

== See also ==
- Flora of the Rio Grande valleys
