= Filemon Bartolome Vela =

Filemon Vela and Filemon Bartolome Vela may refer to:

- Filemon Vela Sr. (Filemon Bartolome Vela, 1935–2004), the former federal judge appointed by Democratic President Jimmy Carter for the U.S. District Court for the Southern District of Texas
- Filemon Vela Jr. (Filemón Bartolomé Vela Jr., born 1963), son of the above, Democratic congressman for Texas's 34th congressional district
