= Rio Grande Valley Ocelots FC =

American soccer team in Texas

- Full name: Rio Grande Valley Ocelots FC
- Nickname: The Ocelots
- Founded: 2010
- Ground: Brownsville Sports Park; Brownsville, Texas
- Capacity: 3,487
- Owner: (Thailand) Kru Kayan Sitsanthaparn
- Head Coach: (United States) Juan Macias
- League: Southern Premier Soccer League
- 2011: Inaugural season
- Website: http://www.mtalliancetx.com/RGV_Ocelots_FC.html
| Home colors | Away colors |

Rio Grande Valley Ocelots FC were an American soccer team based in Brownsville, Texas, United States. Ocelots FC was founded in 2010 and competed in the Southern Premier Soccer League's single 2010–11 season of existence. The team played its home games at Brownsville Sports Park.

== History ==
In 2009, the Rio Grande Valley Bravos FC were successful in breaking into the United Soccer League-to bring the first professional soccer franchise to the Valley-an accomplishment which Sitsanthaparn spoke highly of and even prompted him to personally congratulate the then Bravos FC staff.

Amidst the inevitability of Bravos FC folding after only one season in the PDL, and given his previous experience with RGV Coyotes Soccer Club, Kru Kayan Sitsanthaparn, now Founder and Chairman of the Muay Thai Alliance of Texas (MTAT) was contacted by the few remaining Bravos FC staff members in an effort to find investors to keep the PDL franchise in operation.

Not able to find investors that would be willing to undertake the Bravos endeavor, Sitsanthaparn agreed to move forward with the project, and in March 2010, almost twelve years to the date of the Coyotes' first match, Sitsanthaparn acquired the franchise rights to RGV Bravos FC of the USL's Premier Development League With the same enthusiasm, attitude, and philosophy that was successful during the "Coyote" days, the team was moved to Brownsville, a city teeming with soccer talent and fanaticism, yet neglected by other sports franchises. The squad played its last season as the Bravos at Brownsville Sports Park.

On October 13, 2010, the Bravos FC brand, colors, and logo were altogether abandoned to allow for the development of a completely new franchise, with a strong philosophy and identity that reflected the Coyotes' tedious efforts and accomplishments. Coming full circle with a project that began more than a decade ago, the Ocelots adopted the original colors of the 1998-2004 RGV Coyotes Soccer Club (Orange, Black, White, and Silver). The franchise adopted its mascot, the Texas Ocelot (an endangered species native to the area) and have the support of the United States Fish and Wildlife Service. Team Owner Kru Kayan Sitsanthaparn currently sits on the Board of Directors for the Friends of the Laguna Atascosa National Wildlife Refuge. The refuge is known for being the last habitat in the United States in which the dwindling species lives. By agreement, partial proceeds from all Ocelots FC ticket sales at the gate benefit the Ocelot Adoption Program and Ocelot Foundation.

The Southern Premier Soccer League accepted the team's letter of intent to join the league for the 2011-2012 season.

In December 2010, the Ocelots announced FBT(Football Thai Ltd.) as its official uniform supplier and its affiliation agreement with FC New York (USL Pro).

== Championship ==
On September 10, 2011, Rio Grande Valley Ocelots FC defeated defending SPSL champions Houston Regals SCA 2-1 at Fairgrounds Field in Robstown, Texas. Ocelots FC now joins the RGV Vipers (basketball), RGV Whitewings (baseball), and Edinburg Roadrunners (baseball) in Valley Sports History to become the first minor league soccer franchise to win a championship for the region. Ocelots FC has the distinction of winning the League title in its inaugural year.

== National Premier Soccer League ==
On October 11, 2011, two days shy of the anniversary of the founding of the club, Ocelots FC Owner Kru Kayan Sitsanthaparn announced the club's acceptance into the National Premier Soccer League (NPSL) as an expansion franchise in Texas for play in 2012. For purposes of development and future interests, the Ocelots would have continued competing in the Southern Premier Soccer League with reserve and Under-20 players on its roster, while players on the 2011 Championship roster would have competed in the NPSL.

== Corporate Sponsors ==
The Ocelots were sponsored by Glazer's Distributors/MillerCoors with Coors Light as the "Official Beer." 7UP/RC Cola Distributors is also a sponsor with Sun Drop Citrus Soda as the "Official Soft Drink." The Brownsville Herald and El Nuevo Heraldo (parent company: Freedom Newspapers) were official media partners.

== Players ==
=== 2011 roster ===
Note: Flags indicate national team as defined under FIFA eligibility rules; some limited exceptions apply. Players may hold more than one non-FIFA nationality.

| No. | Pos. | Nation | Player |
|---|---|---|---|
| 1 | MF | USA | Pablo Degollado |
| 2 | DF | USA | Edgar Gracia |
| 3 | DF | USA | Andrew Flores |
| 4 | FW | USA | David Bazan |
| 5 | DF | USA | Jorge Briones |
| 6 | MF | USA | Jovanny Briones |
| 7 | DF | USA | Alvaro Aguillon |
| 8 | FW | USA | Abdiel Amador |
| 9 | FW | USA | Mike Davila |
| 10 | FW | USA | Willie Fernandez |
| 11 | MF | USA | Kendor Vazquez |
| 12 | FW | MEX | Moises Gonzalez |
| 13 | MF | USA | Ricki Rodriguez |

| No. | Pos. | Nation | Player |
|---|---|---|---|
| 14 | GK | USA | Edgar Acuña |
| 15 | GK | USA | Guillermo Muñoz |
| 16 | DF | USA | Abhat Hernandez |
| 17 | GK | USA | Marco Herrera |
| 18 | DF | USA | Octavio Herrera |
| 19 | MF | USA | Eduardo Lugo |
| 20 | DF | USA | Jose Galvan |
| 21 | MF | USA | Edgar Lugo |
| 22 | MF | USA | Arez Ardalani |

== Honors ==
- 2011 SPSL "Stars and Stripes" Cup Winners
- 2011 SPSL Champions

== Player Honors ==
- Abdiel Amador, SPSL Scoring Champion
- Ricky Rodriguez, SPSL Scoring Runner-Up

== Head coaches ==
- (United States) Juan Macias (2010–present)

== Stadia ==
- Brownsville Sports Park; Brownsville, Texas (2010–present)
