= AIM Media Texas =

Newspaper publisher

AIM Media Texas LLC
- Company type: Private
- Industry: Media
- Headquarters: 1400 E. Nolana Loop, McAllen, Texas 78504 United States
- Key people: Jeremy L. Halbreich, chairman and CEO; William R. "Rick" Starks, president and COO
- Products: Newspaper
- Website: aimmediatexas.com

AIM Media Texas is a United States publisher of daily and non-daily newspapers, primarily in the Rio Grande Valley region of Texas.

In 2012, Freedom Communications began selling most of its newspaper portfolio. Former Dallas Morning News president and American Consolidated Media founder Jeremy Halbreich founded AIM Media in order to purchase the Texas newspapers from Freedom in a deal worth $70–80 million.

The newspapers included:

- The Monitor (McAllen)
- Valley Morning Star (Harlingen)
- Brownsville Herald (Brownsville)
- El Nuevo Heraldo (Brownsville)
- Odessa American (Odessa)
- Mid-Valley Town Crier (Weslaco) (semi-weekly)
- Coastal Current (South Padre/Port Isabel) (weekly)

At the time of the sale, the daily newspapers had a combined circulation of about 80,000 daily and 94,000 on Sunday. The deal also included other associated weekly and monthly publications.

Company investors included Chicago-based businessmen Joe Mansueto of Morningstar, Inc. and private equity investor John Canning. Chief operating officer Rick Starks also owns a stake.

Halbreich served as head of the Chicago Sun-Times company from 2009 to 2012 before leaving to form AIM Media.
