= Eddie Treviño =

American politician

Eddie Treviño, Jr.

Cameron County Judge
- Incumbent
- Assumed office November 23, 2016
- Preceded by: Pete Sepulveda

Mayor of Brownsville, Texas
- In office 2003–2007
- Preceded by: Blanca Vela
- Succeeded by: Antonio "Tony" Martinez

Personal details
- Born: Brownsville, Texas
- Party: Democratic
- Education: St. Mary’s University (BA); University of Texas School of Law (JD)

Eddie Treviño, Jr. is an American politician in the state of Texas. Since November 2016, he has served as County Judge of Cameron County. Notwithstanding the label, the position of county judge is for the most part a nonjudicial position in Texas. Previously, he served as Mayor of Brownsville, Texas, from 2003 to 2007.

On January 7, 2003, Mayor of Brownsville Blanca Vela announced that she would not seek re-election for a second term in a speech in front of the Market Square fountain. Her departure set off a competitive 2003 mayoral campaign between Treviño, then serving as city commissioner, and former Mayor Henry Gonzalez. Treviño and Gonzalez placed first and second (out of four candidates) in the election held on May 3, 2003, which qualified them for the runoff. In the runoff election held on June 7, 2003, Treviño won 4,377 votes (64.13%), defeating Gonzalez, who earned 2,448 votes (35.86%) to succeed Vela as mayor.

In the November 2022 elections, Treviño defeated Republican challenger Carlos Cascos, who had previously served as Cameron County Judge from 2006 to 2015, when he resigned to become Texas Secretary of State.

Treviño's term as county judge has coincided with the significant growth of SpaceX's presence in the county, and Treviño has played an active role in managing the county's relationship with SpaceX.

On February 13, 2025, Treviño ordered an election to be held on May 3 on an incorporation petition submitted on behalf of SpaceX employees, requesting the incorporation of a new city of Starbase, Texas. If approved by voters, it would be the first new city in Cameron County since the incorporation of Los Indios in 1995.

In March 2025, Treviño spoke out about a bill in the Texas State Legislature that would transfer some authority over closure of Boca Chica Beach from the county from to the (de facto SpaceX-controlled) future city of Starbase. Although the bill passed the Texas Senate, it was voted down by the State Affairs Committee of the Texas House of Representatives in April 2025.

Treviño has also been an outspoken defender of the Rio Grande LNG and Texas LNG projects, located in the county.

== See also ==
- List of mayors of Brownsville, Texas
