= La Frontera (newspaper) =

La Frontera was a Spanish-language newspaper serving southern Texas, United States. It was a sister publication of The Monitor, a newspaper headquartered in McAllen, Texas owned by Freedom Communications. As of 2009, M. Olaf Frandsen was the editor.

La Frontera was founded in July 2004. In April 2009, the paper won several Texas Associated Press Managing Editors awards; the categories that the newspaper gained awards in were features, headline writing, and sports writing. In 2009 the newspaper ceased operations. The Monitor said that it was due to a poor economy and insufficient advertising revenues. On Sunday October 18, 2009 the El Nuevo Heraldo was to be delivered to previous La Frontera subscribers.
