= Freddy Gonzalez =

Freddy González may refer to:

- Alfredo Cantu Gonzalez (1946–1968), United States Marine Corps sergeant, nicknamed "Freddy"
- Fredi González (born 1964), Cuban Major League baseball manager
- Fredy González (born 1975), Colombian road racing cyclist
- Freddy González (runner) (born 1977), Venezuelan long-distance runner
- Freddy Gonzalez (Filipino footballer) (born 1978), Filipino football forward
- Freddy González (Colombian footballer) (born 1988), Colombian football defender
