= Blanca Vela =

American politician (1936–2014)

Blanca Sanchez

Mayor of Brownsville, Texas
- In office 1999 – June 10, 2003
- Preceded by: Henry Gonzalez
- Succeeded by: Eddie Treviño

Personal details
- Born: May 27, 1936; Harlingen, Texas, U.S.
- Died: February 19, 2014 (aged 77); Brownsville, Texas, U.S.
- Political party: Democratic
- Spouse: Filemon Vela Sr. (1962-2004)

Blanca Sanchez Vela (May 27, 1936 – February 19, 2014) was an American politician and matriarch of one of the most prominent families in Brownsville, Texas. Vela, who served as the Mayor of Brownsville from 1999 until 2003, was the city's first female mayor. She remains the only woman to hold the mayoral office to date. Vela was married to the late United States federal judge Filemon Vela Sr., while her three children include U.S. Rep. Filemon Vela Jr. (D-Texas).

== Early life and education ==
Vela was born Blanca Sanchez in Harlingen, Texas, on May 27, 1936. Her parents, Luis M. Sanchez and Maria R. "Cuca" Sanchez, were Mexican immigrants who moved to the United States from Linares, Nuevo León, and Zacatecas, respectively, when both were teenagers. They first met each other in Harlingen. Her father worked for the Missouri Pacific Railroad while her mother worked as a homemaker. Blanca Sanchez, who was the eldest of her parents' nine children, was raised in Harlingen.

She married her husband, Filemon Vela, Sr., in 1962. He was later appointed a U.S. federal judge on the United States District Court for the Southern District of Texas. The couple had three children: Filemon Vela, Jr., Rafael (Ralph), and Sylvia.

Vela began her college career by taking the bus from Harlingen to Brownsville to attend Texas Southmost College, a community college. She later earned both her bachelor's degree and a master's degree.

== Career ==
=== Public service ===
Prior to her election as mayor in 1999, Vela served on the Brownsville Public Utilities Board (PUB), including a stint as the board's chairperson from 1995 until July 1998. She and Betty Dodd co-founded of the Brownsville Public Library Foundation in 1994. Blanca Vela also became the first woman to hold a seat on the Brownsville National Bank's board of directors.

=== Mayor of Brownsville ===
Vela announced her candidacy for Mayor on August 28, 1998, as a challenger to incumbent Mayor Henry Gonzalez, who was seeking re-election for a third term. She defeated Gonzalez in the city's mayoral election on May 1, 1999. Vela garnered 3,003 votes (56%), while Gonzalez placed second with 2,379 votes (44%).

On January 7, 2003, Mayor Blanca Vela announced that she would not seek re-election for a second term in a speech in front of the Market Square fountain. Her departure set off a competitive 2003 mayoral campaign between city commissioner Eddie Treviño and former Mayor Henry Gonzalez. Treviño and Gonzalez placed first and second (out of four candidates) in the election held on May 3, 2003, which qualified them for the runoff. In the runoff election held on June 7, 2003, Treviño won 4,377 votes (64.13%), defeating Gonzalez, who earned 2,448 votes (35.86%) to succeed Vela as mayor.

Vela left office on June 10, 2003. Vela issued as statement thanking her family and the citizens of the city as her last act in office. In a speech following his oath of office on the same day, her successor, Mayor Eddie Treviño Jr., thanked Vela for her service as his first act as mayor. Vela's official portrait, which was hung in commission chambers, was also unveiled on June 10.

Vela died of natural causes at her home in Brownsville on February 16, 2014, at the age of 78. She was survived by her three children, Sylvia, Ralph, and U.S. Congressman Filemon Vela Jr. Her husband, Judge Filemon Vela, Sr., died on April 13, 2004.

== See also ==
- List of mayors of Brownsville, Texas
