= List of mayors of Brownsville, Texas =

The following is a list of mayors of the city of Brownsville, Texas, United States.

Former city hall building in Brownsville, Texas (photo 2014)

- Stephen Powers, c.1850s
- William Neale, 1858–1859, 1866-1869
- Franklin Cummings
- John Salmon Ford, 1874
- Thomas Carson, c.1880
- Emilio Forto
- John Bartlett, 1904
- Frederick J. Combe, c.1905-1908
- Benjamin Kowalski, c.1911-1912
- A.B. Cole, c.1929
- Robert Byron Rentfro, c.1929-1936
- Robert Runyon, 1941-1943
- H. L. Stokely, c.1952-1954
- E. E. Watts, c.1955
- Ruben H. Edelstein, 1975-1979
- Ygnacio "Nacho" Garza, c.1991
- Patricio M. “Pat” Ahumada Jr., c.1991, 2007-2011
- Henry Gonzalez, c.1997-1998
- Blanca Vela, 1999-2003
- Eddie Treviño, 2003-2007
- Antonio "Tony" Martinez, 2011-2019
- Juan “Trey” Mendez III, 2019-2023
- John Cowen Jr., 2023-present

== See also ==
- Timeline of Brownsville, Texas
