= The Mid Valley Town Crier =

Newspaper

- Type: Wednesday and Sunday newspaper
- Format: Broadsheet
- Owner(s): AIM Media Texas
- Publisher: Stephan Wingert
- Editor: Carlos Sanchez
- Founded: 1909
- Language: English
- Headquarters: 401 S Kansas AVE; Suite C-2; Weslaco, TX 78596; United States
- Circulation: Tens of thousands
- Website: www.midvalleytowncrier.com

The Mid-Valley Town Crier covers community news in an eight-community region of South Texas, spanning Weslaco, Donna, Mercedes, Progreso, Edcouch, Elsa, La Villa and Monte Alto. MVTC reaches tens of thousands of readers weekly, providing more than general news and features from the area but promotions and supplemental publications. This includes "My Winter Visit," a weekly resource guide for Winter Texans that's published every Sunday in the paper's C-section, medical news in every Wednesday edition as well as annual graduation, high school football and health and medical guides.
