= Port of Brownsville =

Port in southern Texas, USA

- Interactive map of Port of Brownsville

Location
- Country: United States
- Location: Brownsville, Texas
- Coordinates: 25°57′N 97°24′W
- UN/LOCODE: USBRO

Details
- Operated by: Brownsville Navigation District
- Size: 260 m (850 ft) LOA x 41 m (135 ft) x 13 m (42 ft)
- No. of berths: 20
- Draft depth: 42 ft (13 m)
- Port Director & CEO: William Dietrich
- Commissioners: Esteban Guerra; Sergio Tito Lopez; John Reed; John Wood; Ernesto Gutierrez

Statistics
- Website; Official Website

The Port of Brownsville is a deepwater seaport in Brownsville, at the southern tip of Texas.

== Geography ==
The port is the southern terminus of the Gulf Intracoastal Waterway. The port is located near the river mouth of the Rio Grande and Lower Rio Grande Valley plain, only eight miles (13 km) north of the Mexico – United States border.

=== Brownsville Ship Channel ===
The deep water Brownsville Ship Channel, to/from the Gulf of Mexico, passes between Padre Island and Brazos Island, Barrier islands of the Gulf Coast. The channel also passes the old harbor of Los Brazos de Santiago, the landing place of the Spanish explorer Alonso Álvarez de Pineda in 1519 and subsequent colonizers from the Viceroyalty of New Spain.

The channel is dredged to handle ships of 13 m (42 ft) draft at high tide, and can support ships up to 260 m (850 ft) overall length and a 41 m (135 ft) beam.

On December 6, 2024, the Brownsville Navigation District (BND) and the U.S. Army Corps of Engineers (USACE) held a ceremony commencing Phase 2 of the Brazos Island Harbor (BIH) Channel Improvement Project, which will deepen the Channel from 42ft to 52ft. The estimated completion date for Phase 2 of the project is 2026.

== Service ==
The port serves South Texas and, via rail connections, much of northeast Mexico including the large industrial city of Monterrey in Nuevo León state.

The Port of Brownsville is governed by the Brownsville Navigation District, a political subdivision of the State of Texas. The District is guided by an elected Board of Commissioners that establishes the policies, rules, rates and regulations of the Port and approves all contractual obligations.

The largest category of cargo passing through the port is wind turbine components imported from other countries, which ship north by road and rail to the growing wind power industry in the United States and even as far as Alberta in Canada.

As of 2025, the Port also features an export terminal for liquid natural gas under construction, Rio Grande LNG, with a competing LNG export terminal, the Texas LNG project, planned to commence construction in the near future.

== See also ==
- Ports and harbors of Texas
