= The Monitor (Texas) =

Newspaper in McAllen, Texas, United States

The Monitor GTLO
- July 27, 2005
- Type: Daily newspaper
- Format: Broadsheet
- Owner: AIM Media Texas
- Publisher: Stephan T. Wingert
- Editor: Stephan T. Wingert
- Founded: 1909
- Language: English
- Headquarters: 1400 E. Nolana Loop; McAllen, TX 78504; United States
- Circulation: 13,607 (as of 2023)
- OCLC number: 14375474
- Website: myrgv.com/category/the-monitor/

The Monitor is a newspaper in McAllen, Texas, United States. Along with the Valley Morning Star and The Brownsville Herald, The Monitor is part of MyRGV, the umbrella publication company for the three newspapers.

== History ==
It was owned by Freedom Communications until 2012, when Freedom papers in Texas were sold to AIM Media Texas. In 2021, The Monitor merged with Valley Morning Star and The Brownsville Herald to form MyRGV.

The Monitor's Spanish-language sister paper, La Frontera, shut down in 2009. It shares content with the Valley Morning Star and The Brownsville Herald. Both are also owned by AIM Media Texas.

Both its former publisher, M. Olaf Frandsen, and its former editor-in-chief, Steve Fagan, have worked at Pulitzer-winning newspapers. Frandsen was editor-in-chief of the Odessa American in 1988 when the paper won the Pulitzer for spot news photography. Frandsen now is editor and publisher of the Salina, KS, Journal, a member of Harris Enterprises Inc.

In 2017 The Monitor partnered with Quartz to report on the issues of climate change in McAllen and Reynosa. The project was funded by a grant from The Center for Cooperative Media.

In 2021 The Monitor merged online with the Valley Morning Star and The Brownsville Herald.
