= Museum of South Texas History =

Coordinates: 26.3028°N 98.1614°W

- Former name: Hidalgo County Historical Museum
- Established: 1970
- Location: Edinburg, Texas
- Type: History
- Collections: Local history from prehistoric times to the 20th century
- Website: Museum of South Texas History

The Museum of South Texas History is located in Edinburg, Texas. It features exhibits on the history of the Rio Grande Valley, as well as the rest of South Texas and North Eastern Mexican States Coahuila, Nuevo Leon, Tamaulipas.

The Museum, which opened in 1970 as the Hidalgo County Historical Museum, was originally housed in Hidalgo County's Old Jail; a Texas National Landmark, dating to 1910. The Museum has since expanded to include three buildings in the town square. Exhibits primarily focus on local history from prehistoric times to the 20th century.

The collections include a prehistoric mosasaur and an ice age mammoth. There are exhibits on the Coahuiltecan Indians, the Spanish exploration and colonization, the Mexican-American War, the U.S Civil War, the Steamboat era, and the Cattle Kingdom.

In November 2007, an exhibit of the "Citrus Era" and the turmoil of the Mexican Revolution was added along with recent area history.

The Margaret H. McAllen Memorial Archives house the Valley's largest collection of historical photographs, plus documents and maps, available for research.

The Museum Store offers South Texas history books and memorabilia of the Rio Grande Valley.
