= Reynaldo Guerra Garza =

American judge (1915–2004)

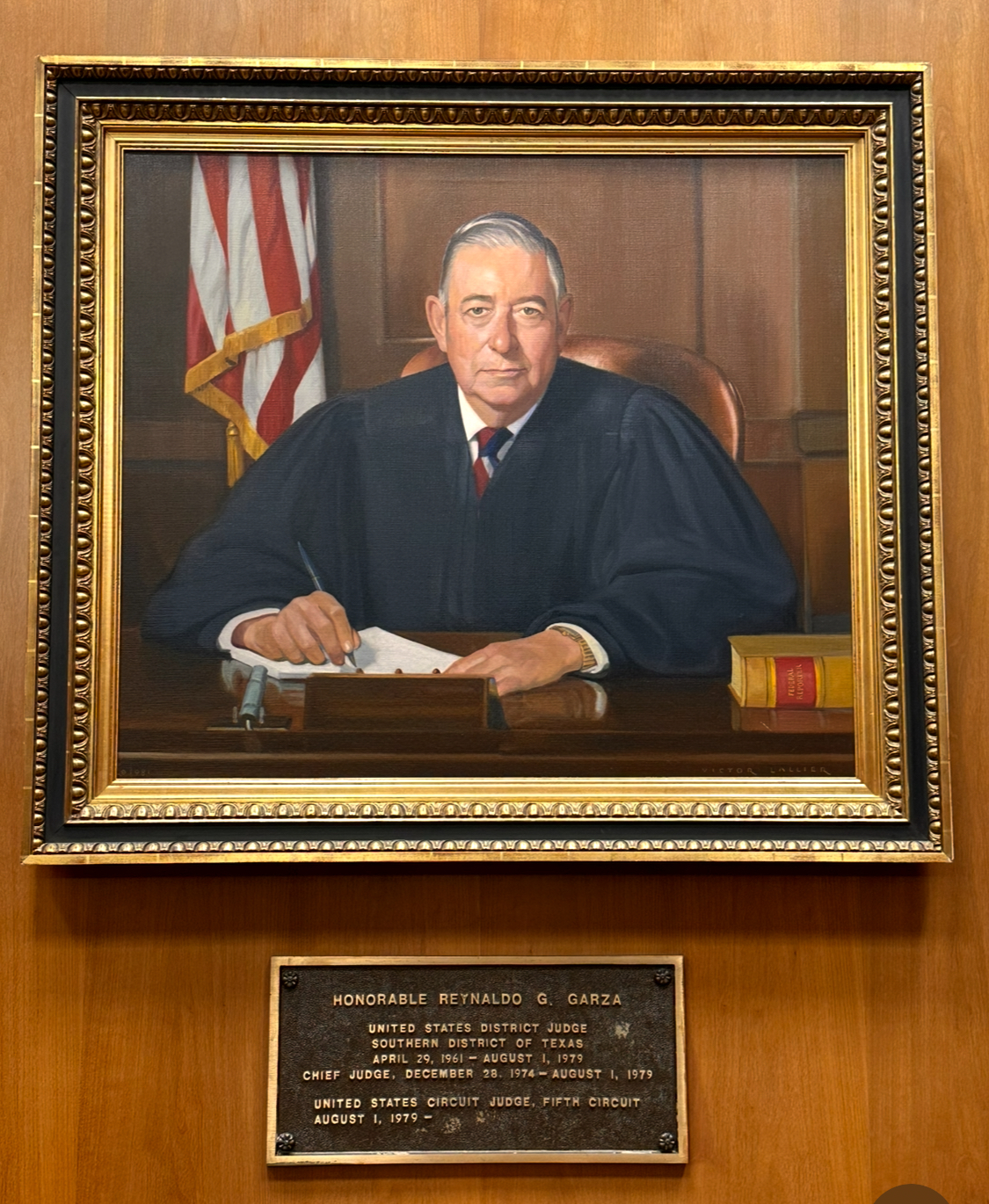
- Photo of the portrait of Judge Reynaldo G. Garza in Courtroom 11B of the Bob Casey (Houston) Federal Building

Senior Judge of the United States Court of Appeals for the Fifth Circuit
- In office July 7, 1982 – September 14, 2004

Judge of the United States Court of Appeals for the Fifth Circuit
- In office August 1, 1979 – September 14, 2004
- Appointed by: Jimmy Carter
- Preceded by: Homer Thornberry
- Succeeded by: Patrick Higginbotham

Chief Judge of the United States District Court for the Southern District of Texas
- In office 1974 – August 1, 1979
- Preceded by: Ben Clarkson Connally
- Succeeded by: John Virgil Singleton Jr.

Judge of the United States District Court for the Southern District of Texas
- In office April 14, 1961 – August 1, 1979
- Appointed by: John F. Kennedy
- Preceded by: James V. Allred
- Succeeded by: Filemon Vela Sr.

Personal details
- Born: Reynaldo Guerra Garza; July 7, 1915 Brownsville, Texas, U.S.
- Died: September 14, 2004 (aged 89) Brownsville, Texas, U.S.
- Education: Brownsville Junior College (AS); University of Texas at Austin (BA); University of Texas School of Law (LLB)

Military service
- Branch/service: United States Army Air Forces
- Conflict: World War II

Reynaldo Guerra Garza (July 7, 1915 – September 14, 2004) was a United States circuit judge of the United States Court of Appeals for the Fifth Circuit. He was the first Mexican American appointed to a federal court when he was appointed as a United States district judge of the United States District Court for the Southern District of Texas by John F. Kennedy. Garza would later become the first Mexican American and first Latino appointed to any circuit of the United States courts of appeals by Jimmy Carter, who had wanted to appoint him United States Attorney General.

== Education and career ==
Born in Brownsville, Texas, Garza received an Associate of Arts degree from Brownsville Junior College (now Texas Southmost College) in 1935 and a Bachelor of Arts degree from the University of Texas at Austin in 1937. He earned his Bachelor of Laws from the University of Texas School of Law in 1939. He was in private practice of law in Brownsville from 1939 to 1942. He served in the United States Army Air Forces from 1942 to 1945, after which he returned to his law practice in Brownsville, where he remained until 1961.

== Federal judicial service ==
Garza was nominated to the United States District Court for the Southern District of Texas by President John F. Kennedy on March 24, 1961, to a seat vacated by Judge James V. Allred. He was confirmed by the United States Senate on April 13, 1961, and received his commission on April 14, 1961. He served as Chief Judge from 1974 to 1979, when his service on the district court was terminated on August 1, 1979, due to elevation to the Fifth Circuit.

Garza was nominated to the United States Court of Appeals for the Fifth Circuit by President Jimmy Carter on April 30, 1979, to a seat vacated by Judge Homer Thornberry. President Jimmy Carter originally asked Garza to serve as the Attorney General of the United States, which he turned down. Had he accepted and been confirmed by the Senate, Garza would have become the first Hispanic Attorney General of the United States. He was confirmed to the Fifth Circuit by the United States Senate on July 12, 1979, and received his commission on July 13, 1979. Garza assumed senior status on July 7, 1982. He died on September 14, 2004, in his hometown of Brownsville.

== See also ==
- List of first minority male lawyers and judges in the United States
- List of Hispanic and Latino American jurists

Legal offices
Preceded by James V. Allred	Judge of the United States District Court for the Southern District of Texas; 1961–1979	Succeeded by Filemon Vela Sr.
Preceded by Ben Clarkson Connally	Chief Judge of the United States District Court for the Southern District of Texas; 1974–1979	Succeeded by John Virgil Singleton Jr.
Preceded by Homer Thornberry	Judge of the United States Court of Appeals for the Fifth Circuit; 1979–1982	Succeeded by Patrick Higginbotham
Preceded by J. Skelly Wright	Chief Judge of the Temporary Emergency Court of Appeals; 1987–1993	Position abolished
