= Alfredo Cantu Gonzalez =

US Marine Corps sergeant and Medal of Honor recipient (1946–1968)

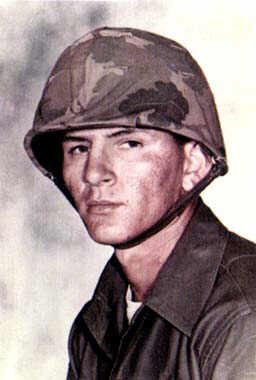
- Medal of Honor recipient Sgt Alfredo Cantu Gonzalez
- Born: May 23, 1946; Edinburg, Texas, US
- Died: February 4, 1968 (aged 21); Huế, South Vietnam
- Burial place: Hillcrest Memorial Park Cemetery; Edinburg, Texas; 26.184°N 98.086°W
- Military career
- Allegiance: United States
- Branch: United States Marine Corps
- Service years: 1965–1968
- Rank: Sergeant
- Nickname: "Freddy"
- Units: 1st Reconnaissance Battalion; 3rd Battalion, 4th Marines; 2nd Battalion, 6th Marines; 1st Battalion, 1st Marines
- Conflicts: Vietnam War • Battle of Huế †
- Awards: Medal of Honor; Purple Heart

Alfredo Cantu "Freddy" Gonzalez (May 23, 1946 – February 4, 1968) was a United States Marine Corps Sergeant who posthumously received the Medal of Honor for service in the Battle of Huế during the Vietnam War.

== Early years ==
Gonzalez, a Mexican-American, was born on May 23, 1946, in Edinburg, Texas, the only child of mother Dolia Gonzalez. He graduated from Lamar Grammar School in 1955, and from Edinburg High School in 1965. Despite his small size, weighing only 135 pounds (61 kg), he was an All-District football player in high school.

He enlisted in the United States Marine Corps Reserve from San Antonio, Texas, on June 3, 1965, but was discharged and enlisted in the regular Marine Corps a month later, on July 6. He completed recruit training at Marine Corps Recruit Depot San Diego, California, the following September, and individual combat training at Camp Pendleton, California, that October.

He then became a rifleman with Headquarters and Service Company, 1st Reconnaissance Battalion, 1st Marine Division at Camp Pendleton, and served in that capacity until January 1966. Promoted to private first class on January 1, he served a one-year tour of duty in Vietnam as a rifleman and squad leader with Company L, 3rd Battalion, 4th Marines, 3rd Marine Division. He was promoted to Lance Corporal on October 1 but to corporal on December 1 before his tour ended in February 1967. Upon his return to the United States, he saw duty as a rifleman with the 2nd Battalion, 6th Marines, 2nd Marine Division, at Camp Lejeune in North Carolina.

He became an instructor at Camp Lejeune, teaching Marines the techniques of guerrilla warfare, and expected to serve out the rest of the war in that capacity. His plans changed when he learned that an entire platoon, including men who had served under him during his tour, had been killed in an ambush in Vietnam. Gonzalez requested to be sent back for a second deployment. Ordered to the West Coast in May 1967, he joined the 3rd Replacement Company, Staging Battalion, at Camp Pendleton in California, for transfer to East Asia. On July 1, 1967, he was promoted to sergeant, and later that month arrived in the Republic of Vietnam. He served as a squad leader and platoon sergeant with the 3rd Platoon, Company A, 1st Battalion, 1st Marines, 1st Marine Division.

During the initial phase of the Battle of Huế in late January 1968, Gonzalez and his unit were sent by truck convoy to reinforce units in the city. When the convoy came under fire near the village of Lang Van Lrong on January 31, he led his men in clearing the area. Further down the road, he received shrapnel wounds while carrying an injured man to safety. When the convoy was halted by a machine gun bunker, he led his platoon towards the position and destroyed it with hand grenades. Eventually reaching the city of Huế, his unit became engaged in heavy combat there. Gonzalez was seriously wounded on February 3, but refused medical treatment. The next day, when a large North Vietnamese force inflicted heavy casualties on his company, he used anti-tank weapons to fire on the fortified positions. He successfully checked the North Vietnamese advance and silenced a rocket emplacement before being mortally wounded by a rocket. He took cover in the Saint Joan of Arc Catholic Church, where he died.

For his actions during the Battle of Huế from January 31 to February 4, 1968, Gonzalez was awarded the Medal of Honor. Vice President Spiro T. Agnew formally presented the medal to Gonzalez's mother on October 31, 1969, during a ceremony at the White House.

== Medal of Honor citation ==
Rank and organization: Sergeant, U.S. Marine Corps, Company A, 1st Battalion, 1st Marines, 1st Marine Division (Rein), FMF.
Place and date: Near Thua Thien, Republic of Vietnam, 4 February 1968.
Entered service at: San Antonio, Tex. Born: 23 May 1946, Edinburg Tex. Citation:

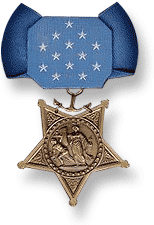

For conspicuous gallantry and intrepidity at the risk of his life above and beyond the call of duty while serving as platoon commander, 3d Platoon, Company A. On 31 January 1968, during the initial phase of Operation Hue City, Sgt. Gonzalez' unit was formed as a reaction force and deployed to Hue to relieve the pressure on the beleaguered city. While moving by truck convoy along Route No. 1, near the village of Lang Van Lrong, the Marines received a heavy volume of enemy fire. Sgt. Gonzalez aggressively maneuvered the Marines in his platoon, and directed their fire until the area was cleared of snipers. Immediately after crossing a river south of Hue, the column was again hit by intense enemy fire. One of the Marines on top of a tank was wounded and fell to the ground in an exposed position. With complete disregard for his safety, Sgt. Gonzalez ran through the fire-swept area to the assistance of his injured comrade. He lifted him up and though receiving fragmentation wounds during the rescue, he carried the wounded Marine to a covered position for treatment. Due to the increased volume and accuracy of enemy fire from a fortified machine gun bunker on the side of the road, the company was temporarily halted. Realizing the gravity of the situation, Sgt. Gonzalez exposed himself to the enemy fire and moved his platoon along the east side of a bordering rice paddy to a dike directly across from the bunker. Though fully aware of the danger involved, he moved to the fire-swept road and destroyed the hostile position with hand grenades. Although seriously wounded again on 3 February, he steadfastly refused medical treatment and continued to supervise his men and lead the attack. On 4 February, the enemy had again pinned the company down, inflicting heavy casualties with automatic weapons and rocket fire. Sgt. Gonzalez, utilizing a number of light antitank assault weapons, fearlessly moved from position to position firing numerous rounds at the heavily fortified enemy emplacements. He successfully knocked out a rocket position and suppressed much of the enemy fire before falling mortally wounded. The heroism, courage, and dynamic leadership displayed by Sgt. Gonzalez reflected great credit upon himself and the Marine Corps, and were in keeping with the highest traditions of the U.S. Naval Service. He gallantly gave his life for his country.

== Honors ==
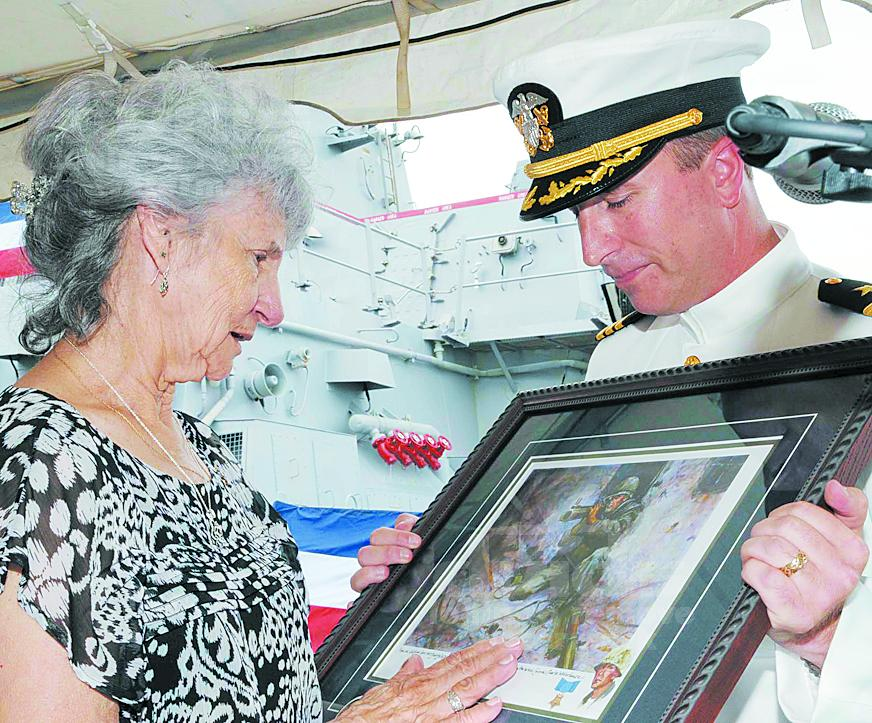
Dolia Gonzalez accepts a painting of her son from Commander Brian Fort during a change of command ceremony for the USS Gonzalez in 2009

The United States Navy guided missile destroyer USS Gonzalez (DDG-66), commissioned in 1996, is named in his honor. His mother, Dolia, had an uncommonly close relationship with the ship and its crew. She attended many of the ship's major ceremonies, including departures and arrivals from deployments and changes of command for as long as she was able. The crewmen exchanged letters with Dolia Gonzalez, known as the ship's "mother," and call her during deployments. Dolia died at age 94 on August 12, 2024.

The Alfredo Gonzalez Texas State Veterans Home in McAllen, Texas is named in his honor.

Two biographies by former Edinburg resident John W. Flores; "When The River Dreams: The Life of Marine Sgt. Freddy Gonzalez," printed in fall 2006, and "Marine Sgt. Freddy Gonzalez: Vietnam War Hero," scheduled for release by McFarland Publishing Company, in fall 2013.

The Museum of South Texas History holds a permanent display containing Gonzalez's uniform and medals. At The Basic School in Stafford County, Virginia, where Marine Corps officers are trained, there is an Alfredo Gonzalez Hall. In Edinburg, both an elementary school and a major east–west thoroughfare (Freddy Gonzalez Drive) are named in his honor.

== Awards and decorations ==
Gonzalez's awards include:

Medal of Honor
Purple Heart with two Gold Stars	Combat Action Ribbon	Navy Presidential Unit Citation
Marine Corps Good Conduct Medal	National Defense Service Medal	Vietnam Service Medal with four service stars
Vietnam Military Merit Medal	Vietnam Gallantry Cross with Palm and Bronze Star	Vietnam Campaign Medal

Texas Legislative Medal of Honor

== See also ==
- List of Medal of Honor recipients for the Vietnam War
- List of Hispanic Medal of Honor recipients
- Hispanics in the United States Marine Corps
