= Valley Morning Star =

- Logo of the Valley Morning Star
- Type: Daily newspaper
- Format: Broadsheet
- Owner: AIM Media Texas
- Publisher: Stephan Wingert
- Editor: Michael Rodriguez
- Founded: 1909
- Headquarters: 1906 E. Tyler Ave Suite D Harlingen, Texas, 78550, U.S.
- Circulation: 6,510 (as of 2023)
- Website: https://myrgv.com/category/valley-morning-star/

The Valley Morning Star, established in 1909 as the Harlingen Star, is an American newspaper published in Harlingen in the U.S. state of Texas. Along with The Brownsville Herald and The Monitor, the Valley Morning Star is part of MyRGV, the umbrella publication company for the three newspapers.

== History ==
In 1938, The New York Times reported on a printer's strike at the newspaper that was organized by the Typographical Union.

In 1951, the newspaper was bought by Raymond C. Hoiles. In 2012, Freedom Communications papers in Texas were sold to AIM Media Texas.
