= Rio Grande Valley Bravos FC =

- Full name: Rio Grande Valley Bravos FC
- Nickname: The Bravos
- Founded: 2008
- Dissolved: 2010
- Ground: Brownsville Sports Park; Brownsville, Texas
- Capacity: 2,500
- Owner: (Thailand) Kru Kayan Sitsanthaparn
- Head Coach: (Mexico) Juan de Dios Garcia
- League: USL Premier Development League
- 2010: 6th, Mid South; Playoffs: DNQ
Home colors	Away colors

Rio Grande Valley Bravos was an American soccer team based in Brownsville, Texas, United States. Founded in 2008, the team played in the USL Premier Development League (PDL), the fourth tier of the American Soccer Pyramid, in the Mid South Division of the Southern Conference, until the end of the 2010 season, after which the franchise was terminated and the team left the league.

The team played its home games at Brownsville Sports Park, where they had played since 2010. The team's colors were navy blue, white and gold.

== History ==
The Rio Grande Valley Bravos were due to make their competitive debut on May 2, 2009, against Laredo Heat, but the game was postponed due to concerns about the spread of swine influenza. The Bravos finally played their first official game on May 8, 2009, a 1–1 tie with fellow expansion franchise West Texas United Sockers. The first goal in franchise history was scored by Adrian Vazquez.

The Bravos had their franchise terminated by the USL Premier Development League in October 2010 when the club’s interim owner was unable to complete his financial obligations to the league. A new franchise, the Rio Grande Valley Grandes, were announced as replacing the Bravos in the PDL for the 2011 season.

A new team, Rio Grande Valley Ocelots FC, took over the team's assets in on October 13, 2010, and joined the Southern Premier Soccer League for the 2011–2012 season.

== Year-by-year ==
Year	Division	League	Regular season	Playoffs	Open Cup
2009	4	USL PDL	5th, Mid South	Did not qualify	Did not qualify
2010	4	USL PDL	6th, Mid South	Did not qualify	Did not qualify

== Head coaches ==
- (Brazil) Ismael Moreira Braga (2009–2010)
- (Mexico) Juan de Dios Garcia (2010)

== Stadia ==
- Tiger Stadium at Valley View High School; Pharr, Texas (2009)
- Brownsville Sports Park; Brownsville, Texas (2010)

== Average attendance ==
Attendance stats are calculated by averaging each team's self-reported home attendances from the historical match archive at United Soccer Leagues (USL).

- 2009: 1,315 (6th in PDL)
- 2010: 197
