= Rio Grande LNG =

LNG export terminal in Brownsville, TX

Rio Grande LNG is a liquid natural gas export terminal project in the Port of Brownsville, Texas, currently under construction by NextDecade Corporation.

On 21 November 2019, U.S. regulators approved permits for three new liquified natural gas export terminals in the Rio Grande Valley in Texas. The Federal Energy Regulatory Commission approved permits for the project – along with the competing Texas LNG (as of February 2025, still in the pre-construction phase) and Annova LNG projects (cancelled in March 2021) – with each of the three companies intending to build their LNG plant and terminal at the Port of Brownsville. One month after approval, the Sierra Club and other environmental groups asked the FERC to reconsider the permits, saying the agency failed to adequately consider environmental impacts.

However, in August 2024, the United States Court of Appeals for the District of Columbia Circuit vacated the project's FERC approval, on grounds that the approval did not fully comply with the National Environmental Policy Act (NEPA). However, construction of the project continued despite the adverse court decision. In October 2024, the developers filed an application for a rehearing of the Court's decision. In September 2024, Senator Ted Cruz (R-TX) sent a letter to the FERC, urging it to appeal the decision. In December 2024, FERC filed motions supporting the developer's application for a rehearing. In January 2025, the developers submitted supplemental motions, arguing that the second Trump administration's rescission of a Clinton administration executive order on environmental justice called into question the validity of the Court's ruling, given the Court had cited that executive order as part of the basis for its decision. The developers have enlisted the support of local officials in lobbying to have the project's approval upheld, including Cameron County judge Eddie Treviño.

In August 2024, shortly after the appellate court setback, the project owners withdrew a proposal for approval of carbon capture and storage facility from FERC consideration.

In January 2025, the project owners announced they had secured a US$175 million loan from General Atlantic Credit.
