= Filemon Vela Jr. =

American politician (born 1963)

Filemón Vela
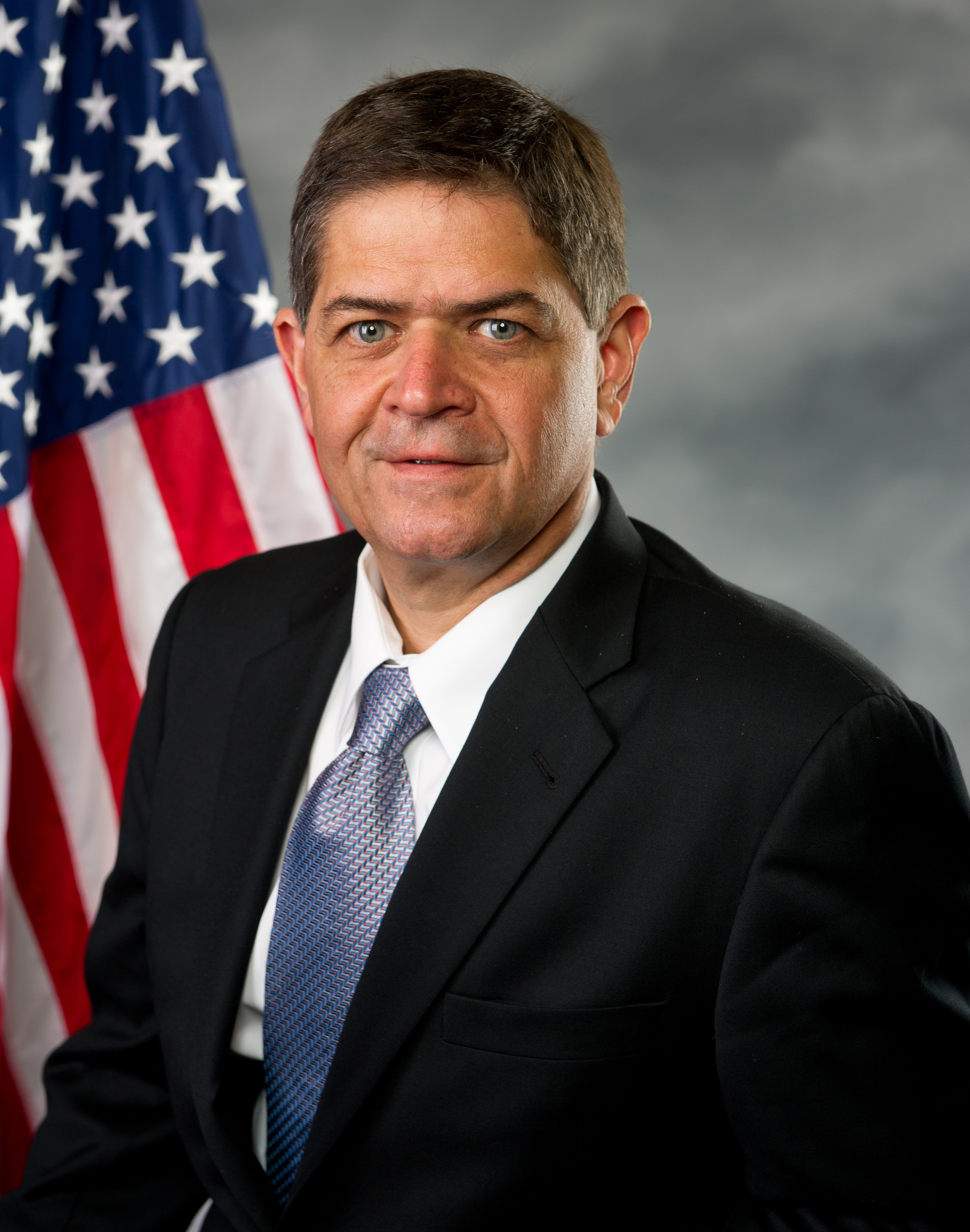

Member of the U.S. House of Representatives from Texas's 34th district
- In office January 3, 2013 – March 31, 2022
- Preceded by: Constituency established
- Succeeded by: Mayra Flores

Personal details
- Born: Filemón Bartolomé Vela Jr. February 13, 1963 (age 63) Harlingen, Texas, U.S.
- Party: Democratic
- Spouse: Rose Rivera (m. 1990)
- Relatives: Blanca Vela (mother); Filemon Vela Sr. (father)
- Education: Georgetown University (BA); University of Texas, Austin (JD)

Filemón Bartolomé Vela Jr. (/ˈfɪləˌmɒn ˈvɛlə/ FILL-ə-monn VELL-ə; born February 13, 1963) is an American lobbyist, lawyer, and politician who served as the U.S. representative for Texas's 34th congressional district from 2013 until his resignation in 2022. He is a member of the Democratic Party. Vela was also vice chair of the Democratic National Committee from January 21, 2021 to March 31, 2022, having been nominated by President Joe Biden. In March 2022, Vela resigned in the middle of his term to work at Akin Gump.

== Early life and education ==
Vela was born in Harlingen, Texas, and raised in nearby Brownsville. His father, Filemon Vela Sr., was a long-serving United States federal judge. The Reynaldo G. Garza–Filemon B. Vela United States Courthouse in Brownsville is named in Judge Vela's honor. His mother, Blanca Sanchez Vela, served as Brownsville's first female mayor from 1999 to 2003.

Filemon attended Saint Joseph Academy in Brownsville, and earned his Bachelor of Arts from Georgetown University in 1985. During his time at Georgetown, he served as an intern at the Federal Judicial Center, the research and education agency of the federal judicial system. He also served as an intern in Solomon P. Ortiz's office in Washington, D.C. Vela earned his Juris Doctor from the University of Texas at Austin School of Law in 1987.

== Career ==
In Edinburg School District v. Landmark, Vela represented Edinburg to fight for more funding. In Pharr-San Juan-Alamo Independent School District v. Landmark, he represented the district in fighting contractors accused of building a poorly constructed school facility.

== U.S. House of Representatives ==
=== Elections ===
==== 2012 ====
Vela ran in the newly created 34th congressional district as a Democrat. In the May 29 primary, he ranked first in an eight-candidate field with 40% of the vote. In the July 31 runoff, Vela defeated Denise Saenz Blanchard, 67% to 33%.

In the general election, Vela defeated Republican Jessica Bradshaw, 62% to 36%.

=== Tenure ===
In July 2013, Vela quit the Congressional Hispanic Caucus because of his opposition to the Hoeven-Corker Amendment that tied border security to a pathway to citizenship. He said "erecting more border fence drives a wedge between border communities which are culturally united".

On March 22, 2021, Vela announced that he would not seek reelection in the 2022 United States House of Representatives elections.

In August 2021, Vela joined a group of conservative Democrats, dubbed "the unbreakable nine", who wanted $1 trillion in physical infrastructure funding to be separated from the Biden administration's $3.5 trillion budget reconciliation package meant to tackle the nation's infrastructure. Although the progressive Democrats had preferred that the two be voted on together so that the bundle was more appealing to members of Congress who supported the physical infrastructure investments but were unlikely vote for the social spending on its own, the "unbreakable nine" ultimately got their way; the funding was separated and the Bipartisan Infrastructure Bill passed while the Build Back Better Act failed.

On March 24, 2022, Vela confirmed that he would resign early from Congress to take a job at Akin Gump, a lobbying and law firm. His resignation officially went into effect before midnight on March 31.

=== Committee assignments ===
- Committee on Agriculture
  - Subcommittee on General Farm Commodities and Risk Management
  - Subcommittee on Livestock, Rural Development, and Credit
- Committee on Armed Services
  - Subcommittee on Seapower and Projection Forces
  - Subcommittee on Tactical Air and Land Forces.

=== Caucus memberships ===
- Blue Dog Coalition
- Congressional Hispanic Caucus
- Congressional NextGen 9-1-1 Caucus
- Veterinary Medicine Caucus
- U.S.-Japan Caucus

== Personal life ==
Vela's wife, Rose, was a Republican justice on Texas's 13th Court of Appeals from 2007 to 2012.

Vela is Roman Catholic.

== See also ==
- List of Hispanic and Latino Americans in the United States Congress
- Final Report of the Task Force on Combating Terrorist and Foreign Fighter Travel

U.S. House of Representatives
New constituency	Member of the U.S. House of Representatives from Texas's 34th congressional district 2013–2022	Succeeded by Mayra Flores
U.S. order of precedence (ceremonial)
Preceded by Jim Turner as Former U.S. Representative	Order of precedence of the United States as Former U.S. Representative	Succeeded by Fred Grandy as Former U.S. Representative
