= Odessa American =

Newspaper based in Odessa, Texas, U.S.

- Type: Daily newspaper
- Format: Broadsheet
- Owner: AIM Media Texas
- Publisher: Patrick Canty
- Editor: Laura Dennis
- Founded: 1940 (as The Odessa American)
- Language: English
- Headquarters: 700 N. Grant Ave., Suite 800, Odessa, TX 79761-4590; United States
- Circulation: 4,182 (as of 2023)
- Website: oaoa.com

The Odessa American is a newspaper based in Odessa, Texas, that serves Odessa and the rest of Ector County.

The paper is particularly notable for its Pulitzer Prize-winning picture of Baby Jessica McClure, when she was rescued from her well in neighboring Midland, Texas, for Spot News Photography in 1988.

The American was owned by Freedom Communications until 2012, when Freedom papers in Texas were sold to AIM Media Texas.

== History ==
In 1895, William C. "Uncle Billy" Griffin came to Odessa from Midland and began publishing Ector County's first newspaper, the Odessa Weekly News.

The Weekly News lasted only one year, and was followed by six other short-lived weekly publications until August 1927, when production of Odessa Times and Odessa News began. In October 1928, the two weekly papers were merged as the Odessa News-Times.

The towns of Penwell and Goldsmith supported, for a short time during oil boom of the 1930s, the only Ector County newspaper known to have been published outside Odessa.

The first daily newspaper, the Daily Bulletin, began in 1936, and the News-Times followed in 1937. On October 2, 1940, R. Henderson Shuffler consolidated the Daily Bulletin and the News-Times into the Odessa American, which he sold on Aug. 11, 1945.

Ownership of the newspaper changed twice before Aug. 13, 1948, when it was purchased by Raymond C. Hoiles of Freedom Newspapers, Inc.

That company, which later became Freedom Communications, sold the Odessa American along with its other Texas properties to AIM Media Texas, LLC, on May 18, 2012.

The Odessa American has withstood brief competition from five newspapers since its first publication. It was published at 222 E. Fourth St. from 1951 to 2018. On November 30, 2018, the Odessa American moved to new, more modern offices at 4001 E. 42nd St., Suite 200, in Odessa. On August 30, 2019, the Odessa American moved back to downtown Odessa to 700 N. Grant Ave., Suite 800, in the Bank of America building.

In 2022, The Odessa American moved to a 2 day printing schedule while still creating digital editions daily.
