= Texas LNG project =

Liquid natural gas export terminal

The Texas LNG project is a multi-decade liquid natural gas shipping terminal project near Brownsville, Texas. It has been in the planning stages since the early 2010s and, as of 2019, gained regulatory authority approval for construction and operation in the 2020s, with initial export shipments as early as 2025. The facility is intended to enable US natural gas that is in good supply in the US to be efficiently stored and shipped to the global market in an efficient (liquified) form.

Note there are two active LNG export terminal projects in the Brownsville area: the Rio Grande LNG project (under construction), the Texas LNG project (subject of this article); associated with those projects is the Rio Bravo pipeline project. FERC approved all three projects together, and they have been jointly the subject of appellate court proceedings. Additionally, FERC originally approved a third LNG export terminal in Brownsville, Annova LNG, at the same time as approving the Rio Grande and Texas projects; however, the developers of the Annova project decided to cancel it in March 2021.

The Texas LNG LLC company of Houston, Texas completed environmental review and received a permit from the Federal Energy Regulatory Commission (FERC) in 2019. The company is expected to make the final investment decision on the project no earlier than 2021, and start construction on the project as early as 2022.

However, in August 2024, the United States Court of Appeals for the District of Columbia Circuit vacated the project's FERC approval, on grounds that the approval did not fully comply with the National Environmental Policy Act (NEPA). In October 2024, the developers filed an application for a rehearing of the Court's decision. In December 2024, FERC filed motions supporting the developer's application for a rehearing. In January 2025, the developers submitted supplemental motions, arguing that the second Trump administration's rescission of a Clinton administration executive order on environmental justice called into question the validity of the Court's ruling, given the Court had cited that executive order as part of the basis for its decision.

In November 2024, the owners of the project Glenfarne Group LLC announced they had selected Kiewit Corporation as their construction contractor, and that they were nearing a final investment decision. The project was previously planned to commence construction in November 2024, for a planned 2029 entry into service; however in May 2024, the owners received permission from federal regulators to delay the entry into service until 2030.

== Description ==
The project is intended, when fully built out circa 2030, to process up to 4 million tonnes of natural gas annually. Phase 1 of the project will process just half that, and could be operational as early as 2025. Phase 1 of the project will be able to process up to 300,000,000 cubic feet of natural gas per day (320,000 GJ/d).

== History ==
The United States has had a massive shift in LNG terminal planning and construction starting in 2010-2011 due to a rapid increase in US domestic natural gas supply with the widespread adoption of hydraulic fracking petroleum recovery technology. Many new LNG import terminals are planning or have begun addition of liquefaction facilities to operate as export terminals.

Texas LNG LLC obtained the project site at the Port of Brownsville in 2013 (on the north side of the Brownsville Ship Channel), and completed conceptual design and preliminary engineering in 2014. The front-end engineering and design (FEED) study for the project was completed by Samsung Engineering in 2016.

The final environmental impact statement was approved by the Federal Energy Regulatory Commission (FERC) in March 2019. On 21 November 2019, U.S. regulators approved the permit for Texas LNG LLC to build the facility, following an extensive environmental review. The specific approval was to build and operate the Texas LNG Brownsville LLC plant and shipping terminal at the Port of Brownsville.

One month after approval, the Sierra Club and other environmental groups asked the FERC to reconsider the permits, saying the agency failed to adequately consider environmental impacts.

As of 2020, the Texas LLC company was expected to make the final investment decision on the project no earlier than 2021, and start construction on the project as early as 2022, with the first phase of the project ready for commissioning by 2025. The second phase, with doubled capacity handling up to 600,000,000 cubic feet of natural gas per day (630,000 GJ/d), could commence operations no earlier than 2027.
