= Filemon Vela Sr. =

American judge (1935–2004)

Senior Judge of the United States District Court for the Southern District of Texas
- In office May 1, 2000 – April 13, 2004

Judge of the United States District Court for the Southern District of Texas
- In office June 18, 1980 – May 1, 2000
- Appointed by: Jimmy Carter
- Preceded by: Reynaldo Guerra Garza
- Succeeded by: Andrew Hanen

Personal details
- Born: Filemón Bartolomé Vela; May 1, 1935 Harlingen, Texas, U.S.
- Died: April 13, 2004 (aged 68) Harlingen, Texas, U.S.
- Spouse: Blanca Vela (1962–2004)
- Children: Filemon
- Education: St. Mary's University School of Law (JD)

Military service
- Allegiance: United States
- Branch/service: United States Army
- Years of service: 1957–1959
- Rank: Private

Filemón Bartolomé Vela (May 1, 1935 – April 13, 2004) was a United States district judge of the United States District Court for the Southern District of Texas.

== Education and career ==
Born in Harlingen, Texas, Vela was a private in the United States Army from 1957 to 1959, and received a Juris Doctor from St. Mary's University School of Law in 1962. He was in private practice in Harlingen from 1962 to 1963, and then in Brownsville, Texas from 1963 to 1974. He was a city commissioner in Brownsville from 1971 to 1973. He was a judge of the 107th Judicial District in Cameron and Willacy Counties, Texas from 1975 to 1980.

== Federal judicial service ==
On January 22, 1980, Vela was nominated by President Jimmy Carter to a seat on the United States District Court for the Southern District of Texas vacated by Judge Reynaldo Guerra Garza. Vela was confirmed by the United States Senate on June 18, 1980, and received his commission the same day. He assumed senior status on May 1, 2000, serving in that capacity until his death on April 13, 2004, in Harlingen.

Vela presided over the capital murder trial of drug lord Juan Raul Garza. Garza was executed by the federal government in 2001, eight days after Timothy McVeigh.

== Personal ==
Vela was married to Blanca Vela, who served as the first female Mayor of Brownsville, Texas, from 1999 to 2003. Their three children include Filemon Vela Jr., who was elected to the United States Congress in 2012.

== See also ==
- List of Hispanic and Latino American jurists

== Sources ==
Legal offices
Preceded by Reynaldo Guerra Garza	Judge of the United States District Court for the Southern District of Texas; 1980–2000	Succeeded by Andrew Hanen
