= The Brownsville Herald =

Newspaper in Brownsville, Texas, United States

- Type: Daily newspaper
- Format: Broadsheet
- Owner: AIM Media Texas
- Publisher: Stephan Wingert
- Editor: Michael Rodriguez
- Opinion editor: Carlos Rodriguez
- Founded: July 4, 1892; 133 years ago (as the Daily Herald)
- Language: English
- Headquarters: 222 N. Expressway 77/83, Suite 176, Brownsville, Texas, U.S. 78521
- Circulation: 6,283 (as of 2023)
- Sister newspapers: El Nuevo Heraldo
- ISSN: 0894-2064
- Website: myrgv.com/the-brownsville-herald

The Brownsville Herald is a newspaper based in Brownsville, Texas, United States. Along with the Valley Morning Star and The Monitor, the Herald is part of MyRGV, the umbrella publication company for the three newspapers.

== History ==
Jesse O. Wheeler, a newspaperman from Victoria, purchased Brownsville's Cosmopolitan newspaper in 1892 and renamed it the Brownsville Herald. In early years, the paper voiced concern for the need of a railroad connection to the north and a bridge to the nearby city of Matamoros, Mexico. A bridge opened in 1910.

It was owned by Freedom Communications until 2012, after Freedom filed for bankruptcy. Its papers in Texas — the Herald, Odessa American, Valley Morning Star of Harlingen, El Nuevo Heraldo, The Monitor of McAllen, The Mid Valley Town Crier of Weslaco, Coastal Current of South Padre Island, and a variety of other weekly and monthly publications — were sold to AIM Media Texas.
