= El Nuevo Heraldo =

American Spanish-language newspaper

El Nuevo Heraldo is a Spanish-language newspaper in Brownsville, Texas, United States. It is a sister newspaper to The Brownsville Herald. In 2009 the 2009 Texas Associated Press Managing Editors' annual meeting awarded the El Nuevo Heraldo as the best Spanish-language newspaper in the state.
