= Alton North, Texas =

- Former CDP
- Location within the state of Texas Alton North, Texas (the United States)
- Coordinates: 26°17′43″N 98°18′42″W
- Country: United States
- State: Texas
- County: Hidalgo

Area
  - Total: 4.2 sq mi (10.9 km^{2})
  - Land: 4.2 sq mi (10.9 km^{2})
  - Water: 0 sq mi (0.0 km^{2})
- Elevation: 154 ft (47 m)

Population (2000)
  - Total: 5,051
  - Density: 1,205/sq mi (465.4/km^{2})
- Time zone: UTC-6 (Central (CST))
  - Summer (DST): UTC-5 (CDT)
- FIPS code: 48-02218
- GNIS feature ID: 1852684

Alton North is a former census-designated place (CDP) in Hidalgo County, Texas, United States. The population was 5,051 at the 2000 census. It is part of the McAllen–Edinburg–Mission Metropolitan Statistical Area.

== Geography ==
Alton North is located at 26°17′43″N 98°18′42″W (26.295148, -98.311545).

According to the United States Census Bureau, the CDP has a total area of 4.2 square miles (11 km^{2}), all of it land.

== Demographics ==
Historical population
| Census | Pop. | Note | %± |
|---|---|---|---|
| 2000 | 5,051 | | — |
U.S. Decennial Census; 1850–1900 1910; 1920 1930 1940; 1950 1960 1970; 1980 1990 2000; 2010

Alton North first appeared as a census designated place in the 2000 U.S. census. It was deleted prior to the 2010 U.S. census after being annexed to the city of Alton.

=== 2000 census ===
Alton North CDP, Texas – Racial and ethnic composition Note: the US Census treats Hispanic/Latino as an ethnic category. This table excludes Latinos from the racial categories and assigns them to a separate category. Hispanics/Latinos may be of any race.
| Race / Ethnicity (NH = Non-Hispanic) | Pop 2000 | % 2000 |
|---|---|---|
| White alone (NH) | 122 | 2.42% |
| Black or African American alone (NH) | 0 | 0.00% |
| Native American or Alaska Native alone (NH) | 0 | 0.00% |
| Asian alone (NH) | 4 | 0.08% |
| Pacific Islander alone (NH) | 0 | 0.00% |
| Other race alone (NH) | 0 | 0.00% |
| Mixed race or Multiracial (NH) | 0 | 0.00% |
| Hispanic or Latino (any race) | 4,925 | 97.51% |
| Total | 5,051 | 100.00% |

As of the census of 2000, there were 5,051 people, 1,141 households, and 1,069 families residing in the CDP. The population density was 1,205.3 inhabitants per square mile (465.4/km^{2}). There were 1,255 housing units at an average density of 299.5 per square mile (115.6/km^{2}). The racial makeup of the CDP was 91.49% White, 0.02% African American, 0.06% Native American, 0.08% Asian, 7.76% from other races, and 0.59% from two or more races. Hispanic or Latino of any race were 97.51% of the population.

There were 1,141 households, out of which 65.8% had children under the age of 18 living with them, 74.7% were married couples living together, 14.4% had a female householder with no husband present, and 6.3% were non-families. 5.5% of all households were made up of individuals, and 1.2% had someone living alone who was 65 years of age or older. The average household size was 4.43 and the average family size was 4.57.

In the CDP, the population was spread out, with 40.9% under the age of 18, 12.6% from 18 to 24, 28.1% from 25 to 44, 14.0% from 45 to 64, and 4.4% who were 65 years of age or older. The median age was 23 years. For every 100 females, there were 96.8 males. For every 100 females age 18 and over, there were 92.4 males.

The median income for a household in the CDP was $17,461, and the median income for a family was $17,043. Males had a median income of $12,098 versus $13,906 for females. The per capita income for the CDP was $5,259. About 54.0% of families and 54.6% of the population were below the poverty line, including 56.2% of those under age 18 and 81.4% of those age 65 or over.

== Education ==
Alton North is served by the Mission Consolidated Independent School District. And the Sharyland Independent School District

In addition, South Texas Independent School District operates magnet schools that serve the community.
