= West Sharyland, Texas =

- Census-designated place
- Coordinates: 26°16′37″N 98°20′18″W
- Country: United States of America
- State: Texas
- County: Hidalgo

Area
  - Total: 2.3 sq mi (6.0 km^{2})
  - Land: 2.3 sq mi (6.0 km^{2})
  - Water: 0 sq mi (0.0 km^{2})
- Elevation: 171 ft (52 m)

Population (2020)
  - Total: 2,004
  - Density: 870/sq mi (330/km^{2})
- Time zone: UTC-6 (Central (CST))
  - Summer (DST): UTC-5 (CDT)
- FIPS code: 48-77866
- GNIS feature ID: 1852783

West Sharyland is a census-designated place (CDP) in Hidalgo County, Texas, United States. The population was 2,004 at the 2020 United States Census. It is part of the McAllen-Edinburg-Mission metropolitan area.

== Geography ==
Sharyland is located at 26°16′37″N 98°20′18″W (26.276838, -98.338393).

According to the United States Census Bureau, the CDP has a total area of 2.3 square miles (6.0 km^{2}), all land.

== Demographics ==
Historical population
Census	Pop.	Note	%±
2000	2,947		—
2010	2,309		−21.6%
2020	2,004		−13.2%
U.S. Decennial Census; 1850–1900 1910; 1920 1930 1940; 1950 1960 1970; 1980 1990 2000; 2010 2020

West Sharyland first appeared as a census designated place in the 2000 U.S. census.

=== 2020 census ===
West Sharyland CDP, Texas – Racial and ethnic composition Note: the US Census treats Hispanic/Latino as an ethnic category. This table excludes Latinos from the racial categories and assigns them to a separate category. Hispanics/Latinos may be of any race.
Race / Ethnicity (NH = Non-Hispanic)	Pop 2000	Pop 2010	Pop 2020	% 2000	% 2010	% 2020
White alone (NH)	52	33	42	1.76%	1.43%	2.10%
Black or African American alone (NH)	0	0	1	0.00%	0.00%	0.05%
Native American or Alaska Native alone (NH)	2	1	0	0.07%	0.04%	0.00%
Asian alone (NH)	0	2	1	0.00%	0.09%	0.05%
Native Hawaiian or Pacific Islander alone (NH)	1	0	0	0.03%	0.00%	0.00%
Other race alone (NH)	0	0	0	0.00%	0.00%	0.00%
Mixed race or Multiracial (NH)	1	5	5	0.03%	0.22%	0.25%
Hispanic or Latino (any race)	2,891	2,268	1,955	98.10%	98.22%	97.55%
Total	2,947	2,309	2,004	100.00%	100.00%	100.00%

As of the census of 2000, there were 2,947 people, 676 households, and 648 families residing in the CDP. The population density was 1,275.5 inhabitants per square mile (492.5/km^{2}). There were 743 housing units at an average density of 321.6 per square mile (124.2/km^{2}). The racial makeup of the CDP was 85.34% White, 0.03% African American, 0.07% Native American, 0.24% Pacific Islander, 13.98% from other races, and 0.34% from two or more races. Hispanic or Latino of any race were 98.10% of the population.

There were 676 households, out of which 69.1% had children under the age of 18 living with them, 78.3% were married couples living together, 14.5% had a female householder with no husband present, and 4.1% were non-families. 3.7% of all households were made up of individuals, and 1.9% had someone living alone who was 65 years of age or older. The average household size was 4.36 and the average family size was 4.44.

In the CDP, the population was spread out, with 42.3% under the age of 18, 12.5% from 18 to 24, 28.9% from 25 to 44, 12.3% from 45 to 64, and 3.9% who were 65 years of age or older. The median age was 22 years. For every 100 females, there were 93.9 males. For every 100 females age 18 and over, there were 89.6 males.

The median income for a household in the CDP was $24,602, and the median income for a family was $24,393. Males had a median income of $17,283 versus $15,125 for females. The per capita income for the CDP was $8,383. About 31.5% of families and 30.9% of the population were below the poverty line, including 36.0% of those under age 18 and 32.9% of those age 65 or over.

== Development ==
The areas growth is largely a result of the economic changes spawned by the North American Free Trade Agreement (NAFTA) ).The region is also becoming popular as a bedroom community for white collar workers and professionals working in McAllen and Mission. A 1998 Census Bureau study found that McAllen-Mission is the third fastest growing metropolitan area in the United States.

== Education ==
Portions of the West Sharyland census-designated place are served by two school districts: Mission Consolidated Independent School District and La Joya Independent School District.

Sections of the Mission CISD portion are served by Cantu, Cavazos, and Waitz elementary schools in Alton. All Mission CISD residents are zoned to Alton Memorial Junior High School in Alton and Mission High School in Mission.

Zoned LJISD schools are Kika de la Garza Elementary School, Memorial Middle School, and Palmview High School.

== Notable people ==
John H. Shary Founder of Sharyland and the Rio Grande Valley citrus industry. His daughter, Marialice, married Texas Governor Allan Shivers.

John J. Conway Purchased the land that would become Sharyland from the Catholic Church before selling much of it to John Shary. Conway played an instrumental role in developing an irrigation system for local farms, and founded the city of Mission Texas; much of unincorporated Sharyland actually lies within Mission's city limits.

Lloyd Bentsen Born in Sharyland and graduated from Sharyland High School. Bentsen was a four-term Senator, vice-presidential candidate, and from 1993 to 1994 served as Bill Clinton's Treasury Secretary.

William Jennings Bryan Retired to Sharyland after his third unsuccessful run for the presidency, in 1908. Bryan and his wife remained in Sharyland until 1913, when President Woodrow Wilson made him Secretary of State. After leaving the cabinet in 1915, Bryan sold the "Bryan House" in Sharyland and moved to Florida. Bryan achieved his greatest fame shortly before his death when he squared off against Clarence Darrow in the famous "Scopes Trial", which tested whether evolution could be taught in the classroom.

Jorge Cantú Major League Baseball player for the Texas Rangers who was born in McAllen and graduated from Sharyland High School.

== See also ==
- Sharyland High School
