= John H. Shary =

- Born: John Harry Shary; March 2, 1872; Wilber, Nebraska
- Died: November 6, 1945 (aged 73); San Antonio, Texas
- Resting place: Shary Memorial Chapel; Mission, Texas
- Known for: "Father of the Texas Citrus Industry"
- Spouse: Mary E. O'Brien (1922-1945)
- Children: Marialice (adopted)
- Parent(s): Robert and Rose Shary
- Relatives: Vittitoe (Present Relating Family)

John H. Shary (March 2, 1872 – 1945) was an American farmer and entrepreneur.

== Early life ==
Shary's parents were Austrian immigrants who came to America and became pioneer farmers. John Shary grew up and went to school in Crete, Nebraska. By the age of eighteen he had worked his way through college to become one of the youngest men certified as a pharmacist in that state.

When he was twenty-two, he accepted a job as a traveling salesman for a California drug company. His travels took him throughout the United States and Canada. While in Texas, he took notice of the great potential for land development. He first purchased 30,000 acres (120 km^{2}) of land between Corpus Christi and San Antonio. The sale of this property earned him much profit and inspired him to enter the land development business.

== Life in Texas ==
In 1912, Shary made his way to the Rio Grande Valley and realized the possibilities of this lush area. At the time it was largely brush and cactus, but Shary was impressed with citrus crops that were being grown by early citrus experimenters and felt that citrus was the crop of the future for Texas. Citrus crops needed irrigation and in 1914 Shary purchased the First Lift Station which pumped life giving water from the Rio Grande to irrigate 15,000 acres (61 km^{2}) of surrounding crops. The chimney from the lift station has been designated a Texas historical landmark and is still standing at the site of Chimney Park in Mission, Texas. That following year Shary planted the first commercial citrus orchard. His first crops were seeded white grapefruit. His citrus empire would eventually grow to almost 15,000 acres (60 km^{2}) of groves. The first commercial shipments of citrus, packed in onion crates, were shipped from the lower Rio Grande Valley in 1920. By 1922 much of the land had been transformed into citrus groves, and cotton, onion, and vegetable fields. Shary took the lead in organizing and building the United Irrigation Company, in order to assure water supplies for future developments.

== Legacy ==
Because of his significant role in the development of the area, Shary was named to the Texas Business Hall of Fame and is remembered as the "Father of the Texas Citrus Industry". He greatly assisted in the establishment of citrus as a productive commercial crop in the Rio Grande Valley. Since 1932, the Texas Citrus Fiesta has been held to commemorate the abundant harvest of the Texas citrus industry. To this day, this area is known for producing some of the sweetest and best quality citrus in the world.

He purchased 36,000 acres (150 km^{2}) of land near Mission. This area would later become known as "Sharyland." Also, the south end of Shary's estate, also formally known as "Shary Farms", was bought by Hunt Realty Corporation and developed into a suburban community by the name of Sharyland Plantation.

A landmark that still stands today is the Sharyland school, which he had built to educate the children of the many families who made their home in the area. Shary was President of the Board of Trustees for Sharyland ISD. He served from its formation in 1922 until he retired in 1939.

Shary Heights, founded by Shary, was one of his last development projects, established in September 1945.
