= Sharyland High School =

Public school in Texas, United States

Location
- 1216 North Shary Road; Mission, Texas 78572; United States
- Coordinates: 26°12′49″N 98°17′1″W

Information
- Type: Public
- Motto: “Commitment, Cooperation and Communication”
- Established: 1921
- Principal: Lori Ann Garza
- Teaching staff: 111.19 (FTE)
- Enrollment: 1,542 (2023-2024)
- Student to teacher ratio: 13.87
- Colors: Red and white
- Nickname: Rattlers
- Rivals: Sharyland Pioneer High School
- Website: shs.sharylandisd.org

Sharyland High School is a high school in Mission, Texas, United States. The school, which is classified as "5A" by the UIL, is a part of the Sharyland Independent School District.

The school primarily serves Sharyland, an unincorporated rural area known for its agricultural and citrus industry. The school also serves portions of the cities of Alton, McAllen, Mission, Edinburg, and Palmhurst.

== Notable alumni ==
- Tres Barrera - MLB player
- Lloyd Bentsen - politician, lawyer, businessman, Ret. Air Force Colonel
- Jorge Cantu - former Major League Baseball (MLB) player
- Jaime García - former MLB player
- Abraham Ancer - Mexican Professional Golfer In The PGA Tour And PGA European Tour
- Beto Altamirano - entrepreneur and politician
