= Koy Detmer =

American football player (born 1973)

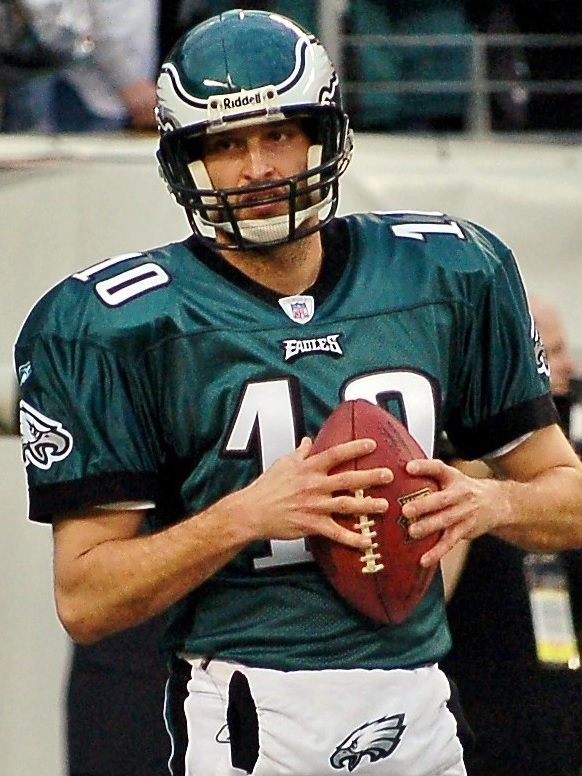
- Detmer before the Eagles' 2006–07 NFC Wild Card game

No. 10
- Position: Quarterback

Personal information
- Born: July 5, 1973 (age 53); San Antonio, Texas, U.S.
- Listed height: 6 ft 1 in (1.85 m)
- Listed weight: 195 lb (88 kg)

Career information
- High school: Mission (Mission, Texas)
- College: Colorado (1992–1996)
- NFL draft: 1997: 7th round, 207th overall pick

Career history

Playing
- Philadelphia Eagles (1997–2006)

Coaching
- Mission (TX) (2016–2020) Head coach; Somerset High School (TX) (2021–present) Head coach

Awards and highlights
- First-team All-Big 12 (1996)

Career NFL statistics
- Passing attempts: 354
- Passing completions: 184
- Completion percentage: 52.0%
- TD–INT: 10–14
- Passing yards: 1,944
- Passer rating: 61.2
- Stats at Pro Football Reference

Koy Dennis Detmer (born July 5, 1973) is an American former professional football player who was a quarterback in the National Football League (NFL). He played college football for the Colorado Buffaloes. Detmer was selected by the Philadelphia Eagles in the seventh round of the 1997 NFL draft. He is the younger brother of former NFL quarterback and Heisman Trophy winner Ty Detmer. His son, Koy Detmer Jr., is the quarterbacks coach for the Michigan Wolverines.

== Early life ==
Detmer played at Mission High School, in Mission, Texas. He led the Eagles to the 5A playoffs in 1990 and 1991. The 1990 team lost in the semifinals against eventual state champion Aldine Mustangs (54–21). With Detmer at quarterback, Mission High established a state record with 4,829 passing yards for a season in 1990.

== College career ==
At Colorado, Detmer threw for 5,390 career yards. He also set a school record with 40 passing touchdowns.

== Professional career ==
Pre-draft measurables
Height	Weight	Arm length	Hand span	40-yard dash	10-yard split	20-yard split	20-yard shuttle	Three-cone drill	Vertical jump
6 ft 0 7/8 in (1.85 m)	180 lb (82 kg)	32 7/8 in (0.84 m)	8 in (0.20 m)	5.14 s	1.76 s	2.97 s	4.37 s	7.79 s	28.5 in (0.72 m)

Selected in the seventh round of the 1997 NFL draft, Detmer spent the next ten years in Philadelphia. He spent most of his career as a backup to quarterback Donovan McNabb and as the place-kick holder for David Akers. His action as a starter was limited to five games in the 1998 season and one game in the 2002 season, in which McNabb was out with a broken ankle. Detmer played well in that game, going 18 of 26 for 227 yards and three total touchdowns (two passing and one rushing). He dislocated his elbow in the fourth quarter of that game and was replaced by third-string quarterback A. J. Feeley. Detmer healed enough to play in the final games of 2002, but head coach Andy Reid decided to stay with Feeley, who was having success. He also saw sporadic playing time in the 2004 and 2005 seasons.

Prior to the 2006 season, Detmer was released after the Eagles brought back A. J. Feeley and signed former Pro Bowl quarterback Jeff Garcia as the backups. He was re-signed on January 2, 2007, by the Eagles to provide a third quarterback for the team's playoff push, with Donovan McNabb out with injury. He was also re-signed to be the kick holder for the Eagles.

Detmer had his NFL career extended for a few days by signing with the Minnesota Vikings on November 6, 2007. The Vikings needed a second quarterback behind Brooks Bollinger while Tarvaris Jackson and Kelly Holcomb recovered from injuries. Detmer was reunited with Vikings head coach Brad Childress, who had been with the Eagles as the offensive coordinator. Detmer's stint with the Vikings was his first professional experience not in an Eagle uniform. The Vikings released Detmer on November 10, 2007, once Holcomb had recovered sufficiently to play.

In 103 NFL games, Detmer has a career passer rating of 61.2 with ten career touchdowns and 14 interceptions thrown. Despite poor passing numbers, Detmer managed to have an 11-year career due to his ability to hold for place-kicks; then-Eagles special teams coach John Harbaugh and Pro Bowl kicker David Akers both spoke highly of Detmer's talent and skill in this area.

== Career statistics ==
=== NFL ===
Year	Team	Games		Passing								Rushing			
Year	Team	GP	GS	Cmp	Att	Pct	Yds	Avg	TD	Int	Rtg	Att	Yds	Avg	TD
1998	PHI	8	5	97	181	53.6	1,011	5.6	5	5	67.7	7	20	2.9	0
1999	PHI	1	1	10	29	34.5	181	6.2	3	2	62.6	2	−2	−1.0	0
2000	PHI	16	0	0	1	0.0	0	0.0	0	1	0.0	1	8	8.0	0
2001	PHI	16	0	5	14	35.7	51	3.6	0	1	17.3	8	6	0.8	0
2002	PHI	14	1	19	28	67.9	224	8.0	2	0	115.8	2	4	2.0	1
2003	PHI	16	0	3	5	60.0	32	6.4	0	0	78.8	0	0	0.0	0
2004	PHI	16	1	18	40	45.0	207	5.2	0	2	40.3	10	−7	−0.7	0
2005	PHI	16	0	32	56	57.1	238	4.3	0	3	45.1	1	1	1.0	0
Career		103	8	184	354	52.0	1,944	5.5	10	14	61.2	31	30	1.0	1

=== College ===
Season	Team	Passing								Rushing			
Season	Team	Cmp	Att	Pct	Yds	Y/A	TD	Int	Rtg	Att	Yds	Avg	TD
1992	Colorado	67	117	57.3	962	8.2	8	10	131.8	23	-5	-0.2	0
1994	Colorado	10	19	52.6	171	9.0	2	1	152.4	3	16	5.3	0
1995	Colorado	65	95	68.4	1,101	11.6	8	2	189.4	14	-36	-2.6	0
1996	Colorado	208	363	57.3	3,156	8.7	22	12	143.7	36	-6	-0.2	3
Career		350	594	58.9	5,390	9.1	40	25	148.9	76	-31	-0.4	3

== Personal life ==
In 2016, Mission CISD named Detmer the Mission High School football coach. He is married to Monica Miller Detmer, a teacher and high school girls' basketball coach at Mission High. In 2021, Detmer became the head football coach at Somerset High School in Texas, succeeding his father, Sonny Detmer. Koy Detmer was previously an offensive coordinator on his father’s coaching staff.

His son Koy Detmer Jr. played at his brother Ty Detmer's alma mater, Brigham Young University (BYU), as a walk-on quarterback from 2015 to 2017. After which he played for Texas A&M University Kingsville in 2018 and 2019. His son is the current quarterbacks coach at the University of Michigan, serving under BYU alum and head coach Kyle Whittingham.

== In popular culture ==
The speculative fiction work 17776 mentions a scavenger hunt played in the far future in which players try to find every football autographed by Detmer. It assumes that Detmer signed a total of 43 footballs throughout his career, poking fun that it would be far fewer than his brother, Ty.
