= Alton Elementary School =

Alton Elementary School may refer to:

- Alton Elementary School - Brenham, Texas - Brenham Independent School District
- Alton Elementary School - Alton, Texas - Mission Consolidated Independent School District
