= Jamaar Taylor =

German gridiron football player (born 1981)

No. 86
- Position: Wide receiver

Personal information
- Born: February 25, 1981 (age 45); Giessen, West Germany
- Listed height: 6 ft 0 in (1.83 m)
- Listed weight: 197 lb (89 kg)

Career information
- High school: Mission (Mission, Texas, U.S.)
- College: Texas A&M
- NFL draft: 2004: 6th round, 168th overall pick

Career history
- New York Giants (2004–2005)

Career NFL statistics
- Receptions: 6
- Receiving yards: 146
- Stats at Pro Football Reference

Henry Jamaar Taylor (born February 25, 1981) is a former American football wide receiver for the New York Giants of the National Football League (NFL). The Giants selected Taylor in the sixth round of the 2004 NFL draft (168th overall) out of Texas A&M. Jamaar was a promising prospect until he suffered a knee injury in college that drastically hurt his draft status. Some experts considered him a second round pick before his injury. During his rookie season, Jamaar had a 100-yard game against the Philadelphia Eagles where he played against fellow Mission High School alumni Koy Detmer who is now the head coach there. On the year he caught four passes for 146 yards. Jamaar spent most of his time in the NFL on the injured reserve list, but showed some promise during the preseason and his 100-yard game against the Eagles. Ultimately his knee problems lingered and cut his career short as his retirement was announced on June 2, 2006. During a game against the Minnesota Vikings, Taylor was pushed into the sidelines on a punt and crashed into Vikings head coach Mike Tice. Tice needed knee surgery as a result of the collision which he had after the conclusion of the season.

== Early life ==
Taylor attended Mission High School (Mission, Texas) and was a letterman in football. In football, he was a three-year letterman, twice named the teams' Most Valuable Player, and as a senior, was an All-State selection.
