= Alton, Texas bus crash =

1989 school bus crash in Alton, Texas, United States

Alton, Texas, bus collision

Details
- Date: September 21, 1989; 7:34 AM
- Coordinates: 26.285059°N 98.297884°W
- Country: United States
- Incident type: Head-on collision, immersion into water

Statistics
- Passengers: 82
- Deaths: 21
- Injured: 49

A school bus crash occurring on September 21, 1989, in Alton, Texas, in the Rio Grande Valley region, resulted in the deaths of 21 junior and senior high school students by drowning or causes related to being asphyxiated. A bottling truck collided with the school bus, causing the bus to enter a caliche pit filled with water. The driver of the truck was acquitted of negligent homicide charges. The payoffs from lawsuits compensating for the deaths of the students caused division in the Alton community. A local middle school was subsequently named in honor of the deceased.

According to the National Highway Traffic Safety Administration Fatal Accident Reporting System, the Alton crash was the sole school bus accident in the United States in the period 1979–1989 in which passengers died due to submersion-related causes. As of 2019 it is the deadliest school bus accident in Texas history.

== Crash ==
Around 7:34 A.M., a Dr Pepper delivery truck, operated by the Valley Coca-Cola Bottling Company, collided with a Mission Consolidated Independent School District school bus along Farm to Market Road 676, also known as 5 Mile Road/Line and Mile 5 Road/Line, at Bryan Road. The bus had just picked up its final student. There was no barrier that would have stopped the bus before it entered the caliche pit. The bus was built in 1977 and had a capacity of 84 seats. The truck was determined to have gone through a stop sign.

The students on board, ranging in age from 12 to 19, attended Mission Junior High School and Mission High School in Mission, Texas, and were from the portion of Alton that had the lowest socioeconomic status. The bus had 42 students in senior high school and 39 students in junior high school.

The bus fell into a caliche pit with about 10 feet (3.0 m) of water. Caliche pits in the area had filled with rainwater as time passed; there were no laws requiring owners of the pits to have them filled in after mining was finished. The bus filled with water within 30 to 60 seconds, resulting from openings in side windows, the front boarding door, and the windshield which had become dislodged. The students did not have an air pocket which would have given them time to determine how to escape.

The lack of visibility in the caliche-filled water prevented students from seeing available exits. In addition, some students became trapped in the windows because of their large sizes, and multiple students attempted the same routes of egress at the same time. The NTSB named the small sizes of the exits as factors inhibiting escape. According to the NTSB, the available time was "inadequate time for 81 desperate students to escape through the available window openings and the rear emergency door that did not remain open before they were trapped underwater."

Agents from the U.S. Border Patrol and 125 emergency vehicles from various agencies assisted in the rescue.

== Victims ==
Of the 81 students on board, 11 students sustained no injuries, 46 sustained minor injuries, 3 sustained serious injuries, and 21 died; all 21 deaths were due to drowning or due to causes related to being in the water. 19 died on September 21, and an additional two died later in the hospital from complications related to the asphyxia they had experienced, with the final deceased victim dying on September 29. Both the drivers of the truck and the bus survived the accident.

None of the passengers experienced trauma-related injuries which would have prevented them from exiting the bus. Most of the deceased students were away from the exits, in the bus's center.

== Legal ==
The driver of the truck, Ruben Perez, was charged in criminal court with 21 counts of homicide by negligence, but a jury acquitted him on all counts in 1993. In a rare interview the day after the trial ended, he had stated that he had spent most of his time confining himself to his house before spending some time in a mental health facility. He had stated the following: "I still am suffering a lot. Even though now I'm free, I still feel so much for the kids [who died], you feel so much what they [his employers] have done to you. I don't know if I am going to get better. In so many ways I might be like this for the rest of my life."

In February 1990 the bottling company made the first settlement with a victim's family. The bottling company paid a total of $133 million in settlements, and it gave each family $4.5 million per deceased victim. Blue Bird Body Company (now Blue Bird Corporation) also paid a total of $23 million in settlements. The lawyers for the plaintiffs of the lawsuits received about $50 million. About 30 brothers and sisters of deceased victims received trust funds ranging in size from $50,000 to $250,000, while parents received the remainder of, and the bulk of, the settlements for victims' relatives. Some community residents criticized some of the victims' families as they used the settlement money to make large automobile or house purchases, and some community members expected those receiving settlements to lend money to them; this caused estrangement between the recipients of the settlements and other community members.

Juan P. Carmona, a history teacher from Donna, Texas who wrote a book about the incident, stated that "When it came to the rescue, one saw the best in humanity, but when it came to the lawsuits and money, the worst in humanity reared its ugly head."

== Aftermath ==
A football game scheduled for September 22 was converted into a memorial service held at the Mission stadium. The McAllen and Pharr-San Juan-Alamo districts also canceled their September 22 game.

In May 1990 a guardrail system along FM 676 at the accident site was installed by the Texas Department of Highways and Public Transportation, as the City of Alton had requested. Other guardrails were installed around area caliche pits.

Alton Memorial Junior High School in Alton was named in honor of the victims. On September 21, 2003, the school had its dedication ceremony.

In 2004 a park developed by the city of Alton as a memorial opened; it was funded by a Texas Parks and Wildlife Department grant. The Josefa Garcia Park has a memorial with 21 crosses, one per deceased victim, and a statue of Jesus Christ. The memorial is at the intersection of Bryan Road and Mile 5 Line.

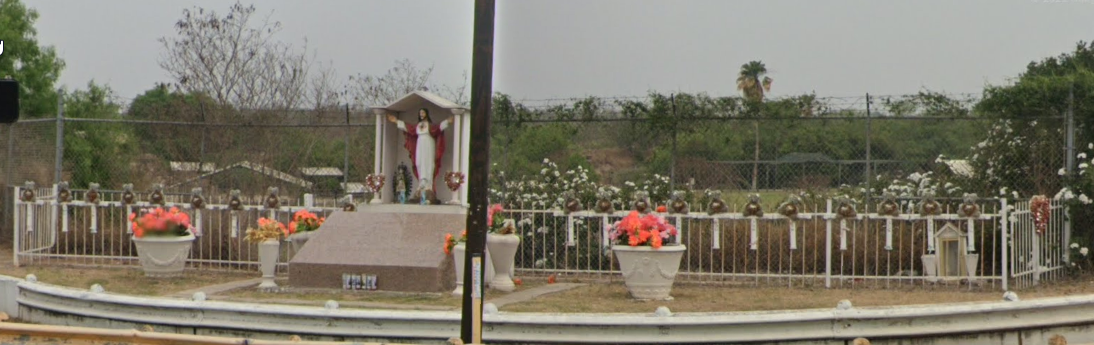
The memorial at FM 676 in Alton, TX

As of 2019 the caliche pit is still open.

== Media depiction and documentation ==
The 1991 novel The Sweet Hereafter received inspiration from the Alton bus crash; it was adapted into the 1997 film of the same name.

The city government of Alamo has possession of a boat that was a part of the rescue operations; it was making arrangements to place this boat in a museum.

There is a book called The Alton Bus Crash by Juan P. Carmona, released in 2019. There was a documentary about the incident, and a corrido was also written about the incident.

== See also ==
- Lists of traffic collisions
