= Sharyland Pioneer High School =

Public school in Texas, United States

Location
- 1106 North Shary Road; Mission, Texas 78572; United States
- Coordinates: 26.301081°N 98.272600°W

Information
- Type: Public high school
- Established: 2014
- School district: Sharyland Independent School District
- Principal: Julie Carranza
- Teaching staff: 99.59 (FTE)
- Grades: 9-12
- Enrollment: 1,492 (2023-2024)
- Student to teacher ratio: 14.98
- Colors: Red, gray, and white
- Athletics conference: District 31-5A
- Team name: Diamondbacks
- Rivals: Sharyland High School
- Website: sphs.sharylandisd.org

Sharyland Pioneer High School is a public high school located in unincorporated Hidalgo County, Texas, near Mission. It is part of the Sharyland Independent School District. In 2015, the school was rated "Met Standard" by the Texas Education Agency. The first graduating class from Pioneer high school was in 2015 with roughly about 150 seniors since most decided to finish their senior year at Sharyland high school. The first full four year graduating class, that spent all their four years at Pioneer, was the class of 2018.

The school serves sections of Mission, McAllen, Palmhurst, and Alton.

== Athletics ==
The Sharyland Pioneer Diamondbacks compete in the following sports:

- Baseball
- Basketball
- Cross Country
- Football
- Golf
- Powerlifting
- Soccer
- Softball
- Swimming and Diving
- Tennis
- Track and Field
- Volleyball
- Wrestling

*Cheerleading team became the 2018 UIL 5A-DivisionII State Champions. First team Championship at Pioneer High School. Took only 4 years for a team to bring a State Championship to Pioneer High School
