= First Lift Station =

- Mission Canal Company Second Lift Pumphouse
- U.S. National Register of Historic Places
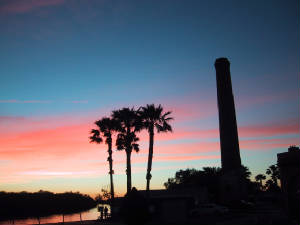

- Location within Texas Location within the United States
- Location: Mission, Texas
- Coordinates: 26°12′43″N 98°19′51″W
- Built: 1910
- Architect: Simmons, Albert
- MPS: Mission, Hidalgo County MPS
- NRHP reference No.: 02000910
- Added to NRHP: August 30, 2002

The First Lift Station is a pump station in Mission, Texas, that once provided water for irrigating the crops of the early Rio Grande Valley. In 1907 John J. Conway and James W. Hoit began the Mission Canal Co. Irrigation system, which was instrumental in the early agricultural growth of the area. Here, they built the first pump station. The pump was powered by steam produced by wood-fired boilers. The chimney, which still stands at the site, was made out of handmade brick from Madero. It is 106 feet tall and 6 feet in diameter. The top of the chimney has a double row of bricks that form a partial design, but the top was never completed. The chimney was dedicated as a Texas Historic Landmark by the Texas Historical Commission in 1985.

The boilers began operation in 1907 and the lift station started to pump water from the Rio Grande. Wood was used in units of 2 to 3 cords (7 to 11 m³) and a crew of 26 men with teams of mules worked around the clock to keep the boilers fed.

The plant was later operated by John H. Shary and by Hidalgo County Water Control and Improvement Districts No. 7 and No. 14. The property was developed for recreational use after dams and a new pumping plant were built upstream in the late 1950s. The chimney is still standing at the site of Chimney Park.
