= Alton Independent School District =

School district in Texas, United States

Alton Independent School District was a school district based in Alton, Texas.

The school district was created in the 1920s. The district had one school; at one point it had six grades. In 1927 the district planned to have all grades for junior high school, while it would send high school students to the Mission school district. Additionally, the district planned to have an apartment for teachers.

In January 1975 that school, then with pre-kindergarten through nine, had 867 students.

The Alton school district merged into the Mission Consolidated Independent School District due to a referendum held on Saturday June 25, 1975. Ed Gomez, the county judge, had set the referendum in place. Alton ISD residents voted to approve the merger with 217 in favor and 169 against, while in Mission CISD it was 238 for and 8 against.

The merger was effective on January 27, 1975. The Alton ISD board of trustees dissolved. Mission CISD made the former superintendent the principal of the Alton campus from January 27 to June 30. All employees of Alton ISD became Mission CISD employees.
