= Jaime García (baseball) =

Mexican baseball player (born 1986)

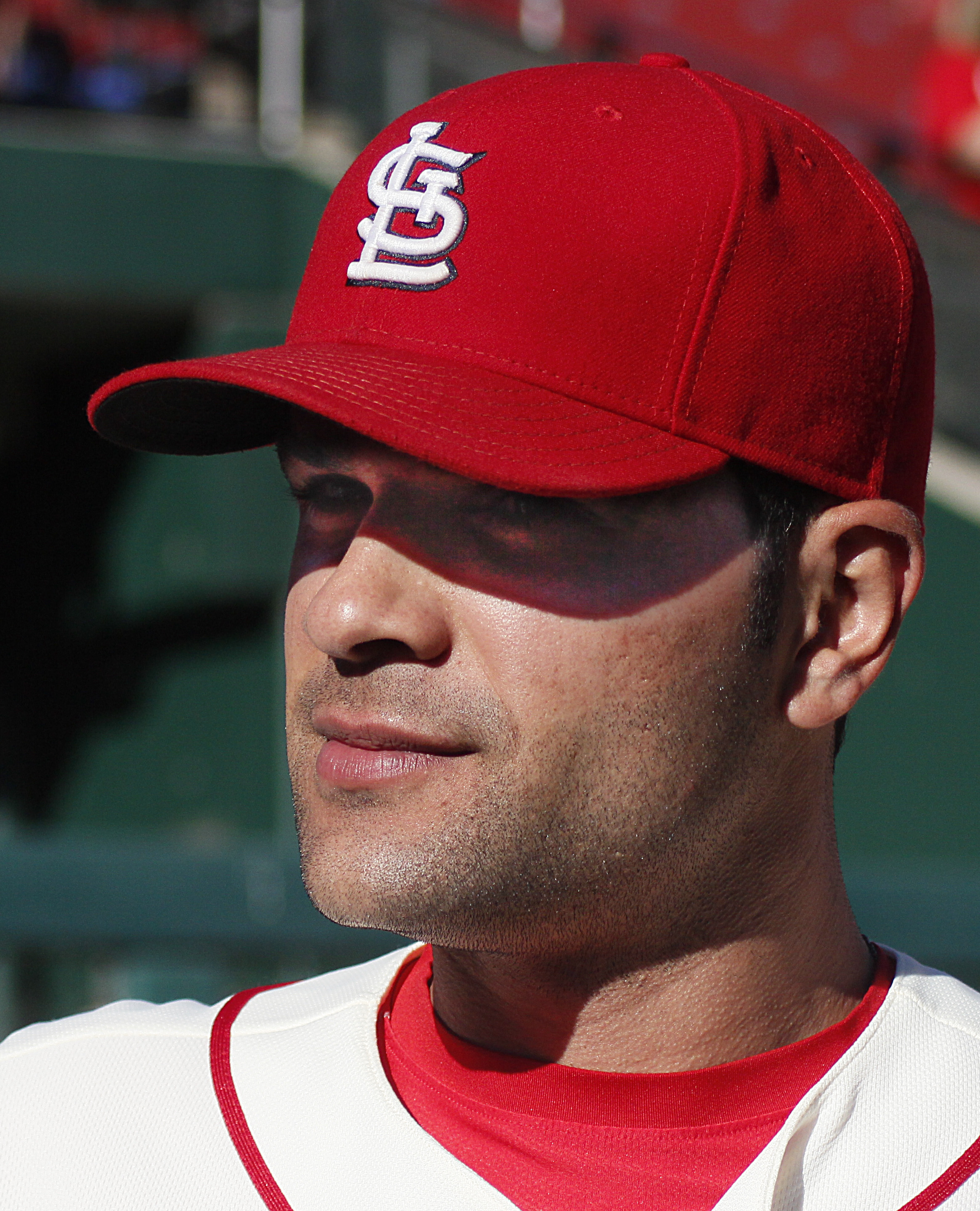
- García with the St. Louis Cardinals
- Pitcher
- Born: July 8, 1986 (age 40); Reynosa, Tamaulipas, Mexico
- Batted: Left Threw: Left

MLB debut
- July 11, 2008, for the St. Louis Cardinals

Last MLB appearance
- October 1, 2018, for the Chicago Cubs

MLB statistics
- Win–loss record: 70–62
- Earned run average: 3.85
- Strikeouts: 925
- Stats at Baseball Reference

Teams
- St. Louis Cardinals (2008, 2010–2016); Atlanta Braves (2017); Minnesota Twins (2017); New York Yankees (2017); Toronto Blue Jays (2018); Chicago Cubs (2018)

Career highlights and awards
- World Series champion (2011)

Jaime Omar García Rodríguez (born July 8, 1986) is a Mexican former professional baseball pitcher. He played in Major League Baseball (MLB) for the St. Louis Cardinals, Atlanta Braves, Minnesota Twins, New York Yankees, Toronto Blue Jays and Chicago Cubs.

The Cardinals drafted García in the 22nd round of the 2005 MLB draft from Sharyland High School in Mission, Texas, and he made his MLB debut with the Cardinals in 2008. In 2010, he was third in the National League Rookie of the Year balloting while posting the fourth-best earned run average in the league. A member of the 2011 World Series championship Cardinals, García struggled with injuries between 2013 and 2014.

After eight seasons in St. Louis, García was traded three times within a year, first to the Braves following the 2016 season, then to the Twins in the 2017 season, and to the Yankees less than a week later.

== Early life ==
Jaime García was born on July 8, 1986, in Reynosa, Tamaulipas, Mexico, as the second of three children to civil engineer Jaime García Sr. and Gloria Rodríguez Flores. He was raised between the border of Reynosa, and McAllen, Texas. He attended Sharyland High School in Mission, Texas.

== Professional career ==
=== Draft and minor leagues ===
The Baltimore Orioles originally drafted García in the 30th round of the 2004 MLB draft. Due to a poorly translated test, the Orioles chose not to sign García. By the time a new scouting director changed the team's position, García opted to re-enter the draft.

Afterward, the St. Louis Cardinals drafted García in the 22nd round of the 2005 MLB draft. Joe Almaraz, the Orioles scout who wanted to sign García the year before, had moved on to the Cardinals organization, and was influential in the Cardinals selection of García.

=== St. Louis Cardinals ===
==== Early career (2008–2011) ====
García made his major league debut in relief on July 11, 2008, against the Pittsburgh Pirates. He pitched two innings, giving up one hit, walking one, and striking out two.

García underwent Tommy John surgery after the 2008 season and began the 2009 season on the 60-day disabled list. Later in the 2009 season, García returned to the Cardinals organization and was optioned to the Triple-A Memphis Redbirds. On September 9, 2009, García retired the first 13 batters he faced in the Redbirds' first playoff game against the Albuquerque Isotopes.

The 2010 MLB season was García's first full season in the majors. He was chosen as the number five starter over fellow lefty Rich Hill, who started the season with the Memphis Redbirds in AAA, and Kyle McClellan, who returned to the bullpen for the Cardinals. He finished the season in third place in the voting for NL Rookie of the Year with a record of 13–8, and an ERA of 2.70 (4th in the NL). García was named a starting pitcher on Baseball America's 2010 All-Rookie Team and a pitcher on the 2010 Topps Major League Rookie All-Star Team.

García began the 2011 season as the number-three starter. In his first start of the season, April 3 against the San Diego Padres, he threw his first MLB complete game shutout while striking out nine and giving up four hits in 102 pitches. For this performance, he was named a co-winner of the National League Player of the Week Award. On May 6, he took a perfect game into the eighth inning against the Milwaukee Brewers, before issuing a one-out walk to Casey McGehee, followed by a hit to Yuniesky Betancourt. The near-perfect game ended as a two hit complete-game shutout. On July 13, the Cardinals announced they had signed García to a four-year contract extension that guaranteed him $27.5 million. The contract included club options for the following two seasons. With the club option, García had the opportunity to earn $50 million, which could keep him with the team for six years until 2017. To that point in the season, he was 9–3 with a 3.23 ERA.

On August 2, García hit his first career home run, a three-run homer off Brewers' starter Shaun Marcum. For the 2011 season, García went 13–7, was second in the NL in complete games (two), shutouts (two), and wild pitches (12), and his .650 win–loss percentage was ninth best in the National League.

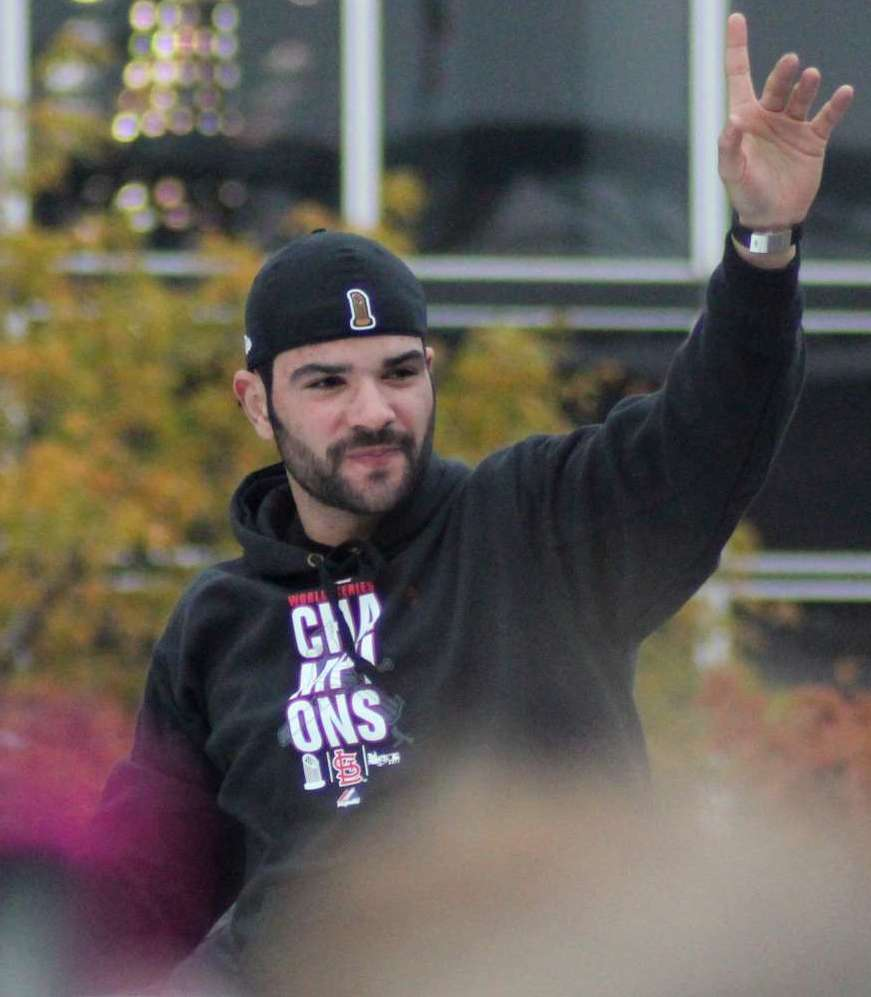
García during the 2011 World Series parade.

The St. Louis Cardinals advanced to play the Texas Rangers in the World Series after defeating the Philadelphia Phillies and Milwaukee Brewers in the playoffs. When García started Game 2, he became the second Mexican-born pitcher since Fernando Valenzuela in 1981 to ever start a World Series game. García pitched 10 innings, including seven scoreless innings, and posted a 1.80 ERA with 10 strikeouts in the series. On October 28, the Cardinals defeated the Rangers 4–3 in the best-of-seven series after being down 3–2 to claim the franchise's 11th World Series title.

==== 2012–2014 ====
García went 7–7 with a 3.92 ERA in 20 starts in the 2012 season before being shut down for the year due to shoulder discomfort. The Cardinals would go on to be one win away from going to the 2012 World Series before losing to the San Francisco Giants in the NLCS.

In 2013, García went 5–2 with a 3.58 ERA before being injured and ultimately undergoing season-ending shoulder surgery, with his last start on May 17.

García was initially thought to be able to play at the start of the 2014 season, but developed shoulder bursitis and was unable to pitch in the major leagues for 366 days until activated, with his first start on May 18, 2014. In his fifth start of the season on June 8, García held the Toronto Blue Jays to seven scoreless innings to earn the win in a 5–0 victory. In the first inning of the game, he issued his first walks of the season, which he had avoided in his first 24 2/3 IP. However, he informed the Cardinals on July 5 that he would have surgery on his left shoulder to correct thoracic outlet syndrome, ending his second consecutive season with fewer than ten starts.

==== 2015–2016 ====
In May 2015, García returned to pitch for the Cardinals. He lost his first start to the New York Mets, 5–0, despite allowing just two runs in seven innings. He gained his first win in nearly a year on May 26 against the Arizona Diamondbacks, in which he completed six innings in a 6–4 victory. His next start, on June 1, was against the Brewers. In seven innings, he allowed one run and struck out four, with less than 90 pitches, but ended up with a 1–0 loss, bringing his record to 1–2 with a 2.70 ERA in his first three games.

In a June 12 start against the Kansas City Royals, Jaime García netted his 500th career strikeout by getting Omar Infante as the Cardinals won 4–0. It was García's 102nd career start; he had also not issued a walk in his first 30 IP of the season. The Cardinals placed García with a right groin strain on July 5. He had sustained the injury on June 24 while running the bases against the Miami Marlins. While carrying out his minor league rehabilitation assignment with the Peoria Chiefs on July 23, he pitched in a combined no-hitter and 2–0 win against the Clinton LumberKings, a Seattle Mariners affiliate. The starter for the game, García pitched the first five innings and struck out six.

While completing 8 1/3 innings against the Miami Marlins on August 14 in a 3–1 win, one of the hits García allowed was to Ichiro Suzuki, for his 4,191st hit in professional baseball, matching Ty Cobb.^{[a]} García achieved his 50th career win in a 4–1 decision over the Pirates on September 5, also reaching 100 IP in a season for the first time since 2012. Totaling 20 regular season starts, he finished the season with 10–6 won–loss record, 2.43 ERA, and 1.046 walks plus hits per inning pitched (WHIP). The Cardinals won 10 of his 11 starts in August and September; and, at Busch Stadium, he turned in nine quality starts in 10 attempts, allowing a 1.70 ERA and 0.888 WHIP. The Cardinals won 100 games and the National League Central division title. He started Game 2 of the NLDS against the Cubs, but lasted just two innings as the Cardinals lost this game 6–3 before the Cubs eliminated the Cardinals. On October 31, 2015, the Cardinals announced they exercised García's team option for 2016 worth $11.5 million.

In his second appearance of 2016, García turned in a career start against Milwaukee at Busch Stadium on April 14. He pitched a complete game one-hit shutout while striking out a career-high 13 batters and inducing 13 ground outs as St. Louis won, 7–0. He became the first left-handed pitcher in franchise history to achieve a one-hit shutout while striking out at least 13. He also collected two hits while batting. The 13 strikeouts were the most by a Cardinal lefty since Steve Carlton struck out 16 in 1970, with García posting a game score of 97, a season-high for MLB through that date. He struck out 11 in eight innings on August 5, defeating the Atlanta Braves 1–0, and driving in the only run of the game.

=== Atlanta Braves ===
On December 1, 2016, the St. Louis Cardinals traded García to the Atlanta Braves for Chris Ellis, John Gant, and Luke Dykstra. On July 21, 2017, in the Braves' 12–3 win over the Los Angeles Dodgers, García helped his team's cause with his first grand slam, while also picking up the win on the mound in what would be his final start for Atlanta. In 18 starts with the Braves, García had a 4–7 record with an ERA of 4.30 in 113 innings.

=== Minnesota Twins ===
On July 24, 2017, the Braves traded García and Anthony Recker to the Minnesota Twins for prospect Huascar Ynoa. A free agent at season's end, García was reportedly involved in trade discussions before even making a start for Minnesota, as they were quickly falling behind Cleveland and Kansas City in the AL Central standings. García debuted for the Twins against Oakland on July 28. He made only one start for the Twins, giving up three runs in 6 2/3 innings while striking out seven for a win.

=== New York Yankees ===
On July 30, 2017, the Twins traded García and cash considerations to the New York Yankees in exchange for minor league pitchers Dietrich Enns and Zack Littell. Minnesota opted to pick up the remainder of García's $12 million salary for 2017, leaving New York to pay the pro-rated minimum. He became the first pitcher to start three consecutive games for three separate teams since Gus Weyhing in 1895. He also became the first pitcher ever to start for three different teams in only 15 days: the previous record was 23 days, by Ed Daily and Ron Darling. He became a free agent following the season.

=== Toronto Blue Jays ===
On February 15, 2018, García signed a one-year, $8 million contract with the Toronto Blue Jays. The contract includes a team option for the 2019 season. García made his first start for the Blue Jays on April 2 against the Chicago White Sox. He pitched six innings, allowing one run on four hits while striking out seven, and earned a no-decision in Toronto's 4–2 victory. García earned his first win as a Blue Jay in his next start, throwing 5 1/3 innings and allowing 3 runs in Toronto's 7–4 win against the Texas Rangers. He was placed on the 10-day disabled list on May 18 and was activated on May 26. He was placed on the disabled list for a second time with left shoulder inflammation on June 23, and was activated on July 15. On August 25, García was designated for assignment. He was released on August 29.

=== Chicago Cubs ===
On September 1, 2018, García signed a minor league contract with the Chicago Cubs. He had his contract selected on September 4.

On January 9, 2019, García announced his retirement.

== Pitching style ==
Four pitches comprised García's arsenal: fastball that reached approximately 90 miles per hour (140 km/h), curveball, slider and changeup. Manager Mike Matheny has called the movement on his pitches "baffling" and "wipeout".

== Personal life ==
García is a Christian. García has two sisters, Karina and Aimee García. García has partnered with the charity Water Mission.

Garcia grew up a New York Yankees fan.

== Awards ==
Championships earned or shared
Title	Times	Dates	Ref
National League champion	2	2011, 2013	
World Series champion	1	2011	

- All-Star Futures Game selection (2008)
- Baseball America's All-Rookie team (2010)
- National League Player of the Week Award (April 4, 2011)
- Topps All-Star Rookie Pitcher (2010)

== See also ==
- List of Major League Baseball players from Mexico
- St. Louis Cardinals all-time roster

== Notes ==
- ^{a} Ichiro Suzuki achieved his hit total both in Major League Baseball and the Nippon Professional Baseball league in Japan.
