= Shary Heights Historic District =

Historic District in Mission, Texas

- Shary Heights
- U.S. National Register of Historic Places
- U.S. Historic district
- Location within Texas Location within the United States
- Location: Roughly bounded by the northern property line along Ebony Lane on the north, Shary Municipal Golf Course on the east, former Big Melch Canal on the south, and North Conway Avenue on the west
- Coordinates: 26°13′27″N 98°19′21″W
- Area: 21.65 acres (8.76 ha)
- Built: 1945
- Built by: Various Builders
- Architect: Warren Charles Suter, William C. Baxter, Zeb Rike, Emory A. Dugat
- Architectural style: Ranch; Mid-century Modern
- NRHP reference No.: 100012751
- Added to NRHP: February 26, 2026

Shary Heights is a small, primarily residential neighborhood in Mission, Texas, located approximately one mile north of the central business district. The historic district is roughly bounded by the northern property line along Ebony Lane on the north, the Shary Municipal Golf Course on the east, the historic path of the former Big Melch Canal on the south, and North Conway Avenue on the west. Known collectively as Shary Heights, it includes two historic subdivisions: Shary Heights, platted by John H. Shary in 1945, and Conway Gardens, platted by Alice Dale Pickler Conway in 1961, as well as three homes built in the West Addition to Sharyland tract at the district's edge now absorbed into the neighborhood.

== History ==
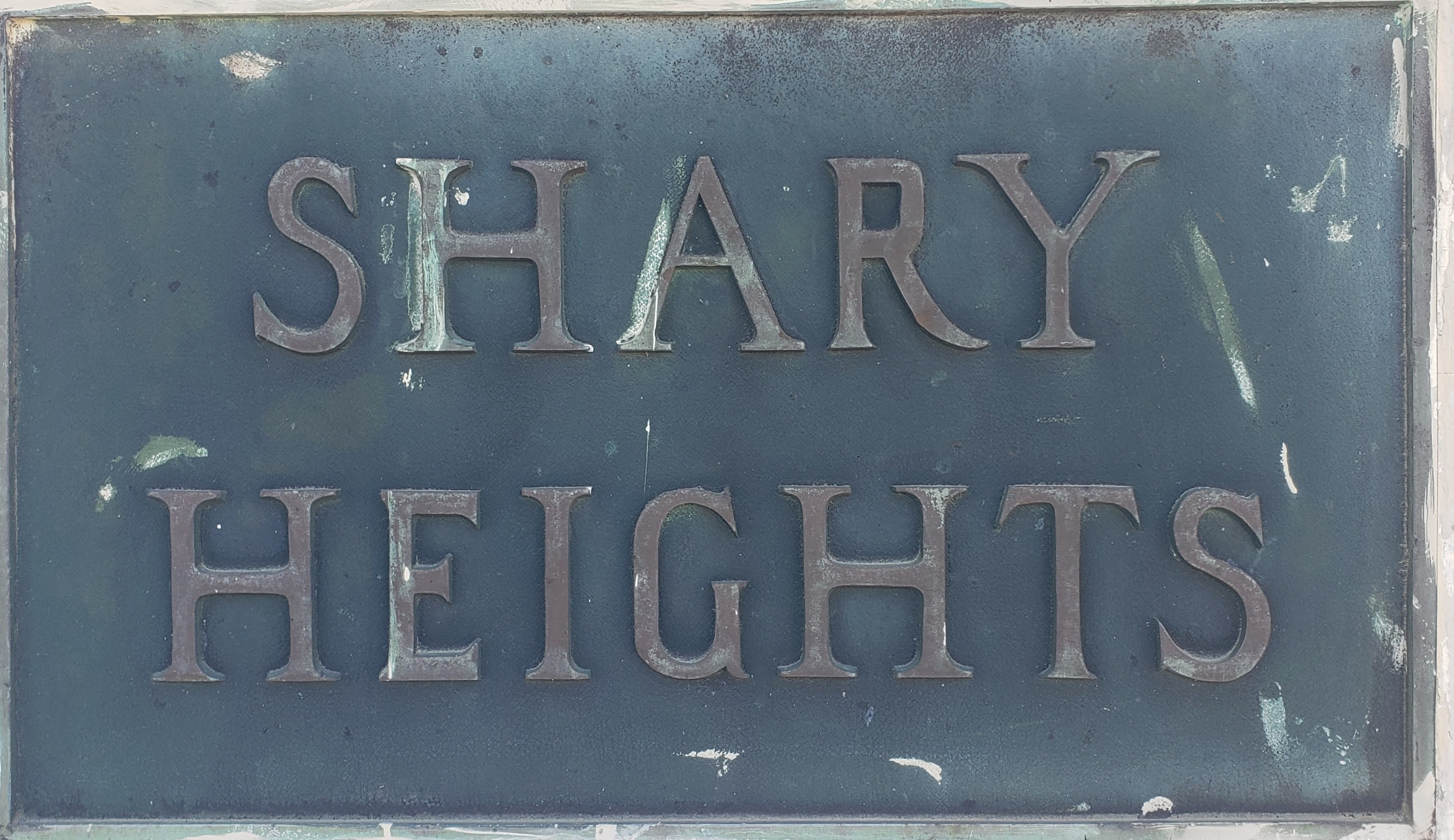
A close-up view of the Shary Heights signs on the entryway on Bougainvillea Drive.

After World War II, elite citizens in Mission lobbied John H. Shary to create a new upper-class residential development in Mission, which Shary platted on September 1st, 1945. This became one of his last activities before his death in November 1945. In the original deed and restrictions, Shary stated,

"AND, WHEREAS, Mission and its surrounding community have indicated a desire for a high class and highly restricted residential addition to Mission and it being my desire, also, to conform with their wishes I wish to place certain building and other restrictions on the above described premises".

When designed, the Shary Heights subdivision originally consisted of "44 large lots on a plot of ground approximately 12 acres in extent," with its "principal east-west boulevard constructed in esplanade fashion with "islands" for the planting of trees and shrubbery." From its inception in 1945, the Shary Estate managed the sales and development of Shary Heights after Shary's death under Allan Shivers and Roy K. Straw, executive manager of Southtex Land Sales. Although most property owners were local, some out-of-state buyers purchased property, representing the desirability of the Rio Grande Valley lifestyle and investment opportunities.

In 1947, W. Coy Stevens built the Thomas and Mary Robertson House, the first home in the neighborhood. During this time, other undeveloped lots were dense brush. During development, the material impacts of World War II impacted construction and design. Irrigation was essential to the agricultural growth of the Rio Grande Valley and by the 1940s, new neighborhoods in Mission came with canal-fed irrigation, and such infrastructure improvements were a marker of community progress and expansion. Little Melch Canal and Big Melch Canal were designed to supply Shary Heights with richly sourced canal-fed water for gardens. Valley Brick and Tile also supplied critical materials for neighborhood development. Shary Heights developed slowly in the late 1940s and more rapidly by the 1950s. East 19th Street was changed to Ebony Lane at the request of residents in August 1951.

In recent years, residents have continued to maintain the original historic vegetation, including ebony trees saved for the construction of homes in Shary Heights and the historic "islands" with bougainvillea shrubbery. In 2007, residents also worked with the City of Mission to establish the Shary Heights Butterfly Garden, along the Shary Municipal Golf Course. In 2023, the Dovalina House was a subject of the American Institute of Architects-LRGV Chapter Conference Tour "Main Street of the Valley": Buildings and Landscapes of Business Highway 83.

== Contributing subdivisions ==
=== Conway Gardens ===
Shary Heights bordered farmland owned by Roy and Alice Dale Pickler Conway to the north. The Conway home preceded the development of Shary Heights and was outside the district boundaries. Built in 1915, it was home to Roy and Alice Dale Conway, son and daughter-in-law of John Conway (1860–1931), a founder of Mission. The large frame house served as the Conway family home from 1915 to 1994, when it was replaced with the driving range at the Shary Municipal Golf Course. In the early years, the Conway home served as Mission's post office. The home was believed to be the first to have air-conditioning in Mission added c. 1951. The surrounding property to the north was a productive farm, where oranges, tangerines, and grapefruits grew.

In the 1950s, Roy and Alice Dale Conway sold land to Trinidad Valverde, who built a home along Ebony Lane in 1959. Valverde worked for Conway for years and became a longtime friend. After Roy died that year, Alice Dale subdivided Conway Gardens two years later, in October 1961. Little is known about why she developed Conway Gardens; however, Valverde most likely wanted to be located near the Conway family. This agreement likely catalyzed broader development, which only included five lots. The lot where the Conway home stood until 1994 was the only development of Roy and Alice Dale Conway. Unlike Shary Heights, no such formal restrictions were articulated for Conway Gardens.

=== West Addition to Sharyland ===
Several houses were part of the West Addition to Sharyland tract bordering the northern edges of Shary Heights. These properties were immediately adjacent to the Shary Heights and Conway Gardens subdivisions and were compatible in terms of design and construction date. During the period of significance, they were absorbed into and considered part of what is now Shary Heights.

== Race relations ==
Shary Heights was originally intended for white residents as articulated in Clause 5 of the restrictive covenant written in 1945 by John H. Shary. It stated that:

"At no time shall the land included in said tract or any part thereof, or any building erected thereon, be occupied, used, sold, leased or rented by any Negro, Japanese, Chinese, unnaturalized citizens or Latin-Americans or any person of above extraction, except that this covenant shall not prevent occupancy by domestic servants of a different race or nationality regularly employed by the owners of property thereof or their tenants."

In April 1950, a backlash against the restrictive covenant was brought to the forefront of the mayoral race between then-current mayor Logan Duncan, a Shary Heights resident, and Eutimio Longoria. Longoria blamed incumbent Duncan for "knowing that better than half the population of Mission was Latin American and knowing also that the building restrictions of Shary Heights were discriminatory against them, he did nothing to remedy such conditions when the addition was admitted to the city." Duncan dismissed the allegations by responding with city council minutes from April 3rd, 1947, which stated that:

It was called to the attention of those present that the city through its commission was not in any way responsible for this clause, and in fact were not aware that such a clause existed; and as a measure to cure or prevent such a condition arising in the future, the commission hereby goes on record stating that no other addition will be taken into the city of Mission containing a racial discrimination clause.

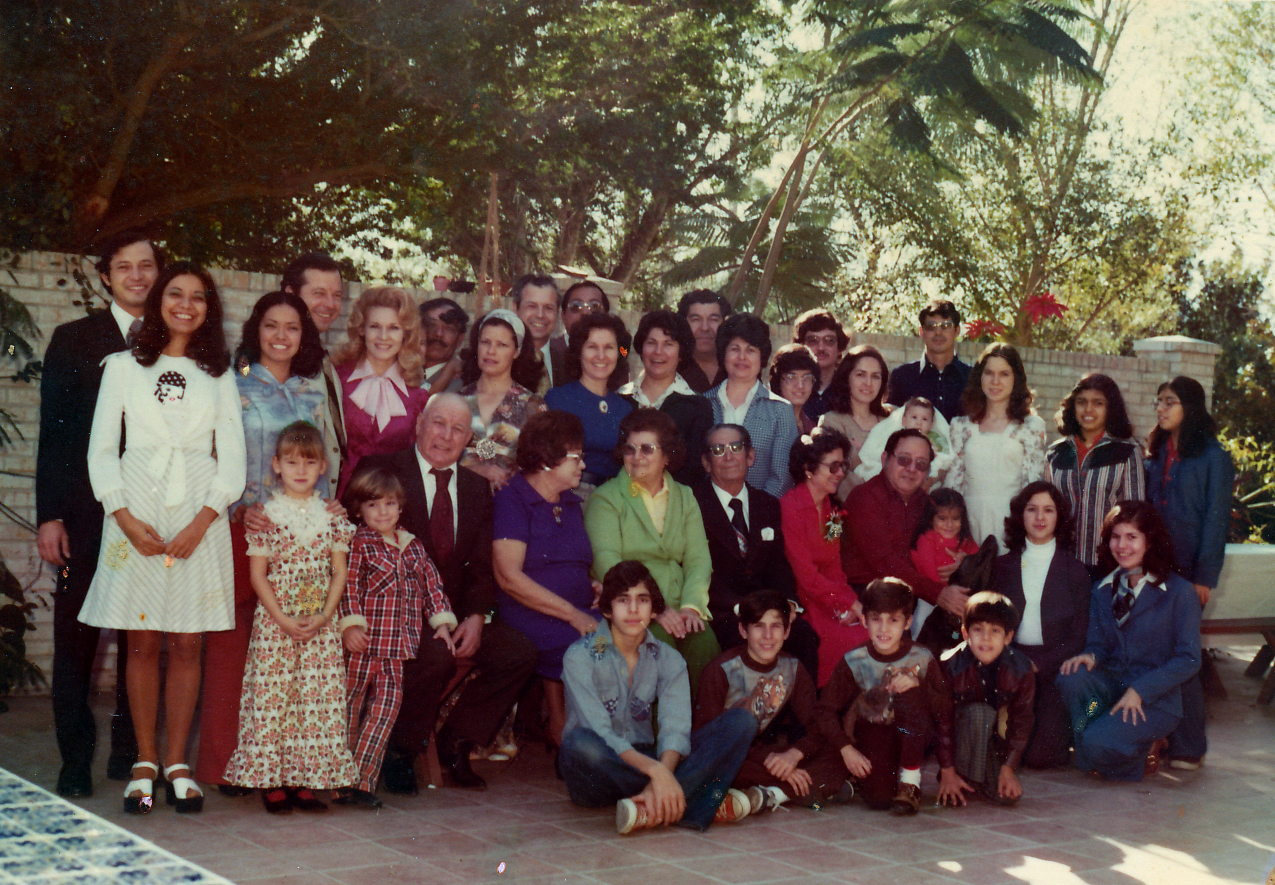
A photograph of the Dovalina and Codina families on Christmas Day 1975 at 1812 Miller Avenue. The Dovalina Family is the seventh Mexican-American family to move into Shary Heights. From the Dovalina-Garza Family Archive.

While Shary Heights remained a predominantly white neighborhood there were a few exceptions. Ten years after its inception, Miguel and Elvira F. Olivarez purchased the Robert E. and Mary Dolores Bentsen home on May 10th, 1955. The Olivarez family was the first Mexican American family to live in Shary Heights. In just two months, Felix T. and Alicia Martinez were the second Hispanic family in the neighborhood. Wealth seemed to be the main factor for access to the neighborhood. By 1970, the David and Dora Dovalina family became the seventh Mexican-American family. By 1975, Shary Heights was more integrated.

== Architecture ==
Shary Heights is composed of post-World War II modern Ranch homes, typically one or two stories with integrated two car garages. The homes were designed with rectangular, L-shaped, or irregular plans, wood frame structures with brick or faux stone exterior cladding, low-pitched hipped or side-gabled roofs, ornamental metal railings, wide overhangs and porches, original picture, multi-light, or ribbon windows, broad chimneys, and screen block. These elements combined strongly convey an affluent mid-20th century modern residential suburb in Mission. Some homes built in the late 1940s and early 1950s were simpler Ranch houses, smaller in scale, with more modest detailing and commonly had metal or wood casement windows specifically at corners of the homes. Two-story examples from this period are rare.

By the 1960s and 1970s, homes tended to be larger with more elaborate detailing and features, some equipped with a pool and pool house. The Jack and Zella Campbell House is the only Styled Ranch home with distinct Tudor detailing in the district, a larger floor plan, and sprawling views of the Shary Municipal Golf Course. Formerly residential properties concentrated along North Conway Avenue have since been converted for commercial use.

Shary Heights represents an excellent local example of a post-World War II automobile suburb developed between the 1940s and 1970s. Prominent local architects Warren C. Suter, William C. Baxter, Zeb Rike, and Emory A. Dugat designed homes. After 1975, most of the original owners sold to new owners. Mission grew exponentially in that period, and other newer affluent neighborhoods were built likely to attract the city's elite. While other post-war neighborhoods in Mission have been significantly altered, Shary Heights maintains good historic integrity.

=== Blueprints for Shary Heights ===
- The Buescher-Dovalina House (Warren C. Suter, 1949)
- The Olive I. and M.W. Held House (Warren C. Suter, 1956)
- The Anderson-Brashear House (Warren C. Suter, 1951; Warren C. Suter, 1963 addition)
- The Vessels-Martinez House (John Edgar Walsh, 1949)
- The Hallie Gettinger House (Zeb Rike, 1951)
- The Houston Strong House (Zeb Rike, 1950)
- The Henry Lankford House (Emory A. Dugat, 1952)

== Significance ==
=== Landscape design ===
The landscape design of Shary Heights became the residential template for the Mission Garden Club. Active members, including several who served as club president, resided in the neighborhood and sought to beautify it.

Many residents transformed their home gardens. In May 1951, residents participated and hosted a flower show in Shary Heights titled Flowers for Contemporary Homes. These community activities demonstrate the importance of the lush, historic landscape during the period of significance. Residents were also involved in the American Poinsettia Society, founded under the Mission Garden Club in 1953. Both horticultural clubs shaped local, regional, and national garden trends. Local and national journalists featured several Shary Heights homes in the annual poinsettia show, appearing in Homemaker and Gardener, the New York Times in 1961, and Arrangements on Parade. Even the city flower became the poinsettia during this period.

=== President Dwight D. Eisenhower visits Shary Heights ===
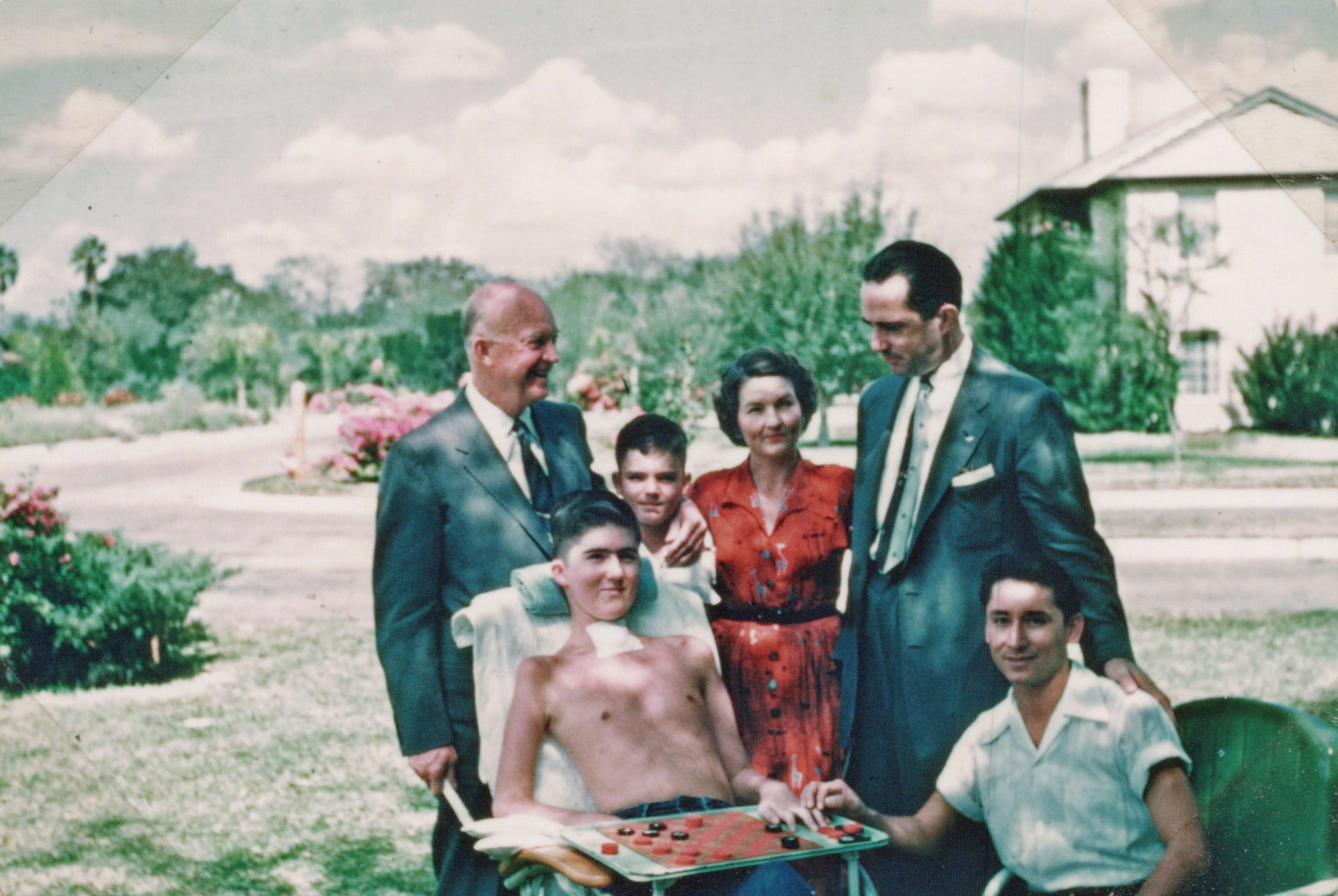
A photograph featuring (L-R) President Dwight Eisenhower, Bill Robertson, Mary Robertson, Texas Governor Allan Shivers, Tommy Robertson, and an unidentified nurse on October 19th, 1953.

In October 1953, Former President Dwight D. Eisenhower dedicated Falcon Dam near Roma, Texas. Eisenhower traveled to Mission because then-Governor Allan Shivers, married to Maryalice Shary, had ties to Mission. Both Shivers and Shary had been instrumental in developing the neighborhood. Eisenhower visited Shary Heights on October 19th, 1953, with Governor Shivers. The Robertson family was connected to Shivers. Son Tommy Robertson contracted polio earlier that year, prior to the development of the vaccine in 1955, and Governor Shivers brought President Eisenhower to meet Tommy.

=== Connection to Texas State Parks ===
Shary Heights was also home to two families who directly contributed to two Texas State Parks: Buescher State Park in Smithville, and Bentsen-Rio Grande Valley State Park in Mission. In the case of Bentsen-Rio Grande State Park, Alton Bentsen was the park's visionary. While Lloyd and Elmer Bentsen previously owned the land, Alton developed the modern amenities that became Bentsen-Rio Grande State Park.

While Buescher State Park was developed in the 1930s, Leroy Buescher, along with his brother Norman, renamed the park Buescher Science Park in 1969. This vision aimed to combine "research, study and teaching with recreation" to probe "such questions as air and water pollution, as a retreat for students, physicians and scientists...plotted as a "living museum" of science." Ultimately, both families contributed to the development of Texas State Parks during the twentieth century, further demonstrating residents' commitment to environmental and wildlife conservation.

== See also ==
- National Register of Historic Places listings in Hidalgo County, Texas
- Mission, Texas
