= Hayes-Sammons Pesticide Plant =

Superfund site in Texas, US

Coordinates: 26.2136°N 98.3232°W

The Hayes-Sammons Pesticide Plant is a warehouse and chemical plant in Mission, Texas. It was made a Superfund by the United States Environmental Protection Agency in 1987.

== History ==
The warehouse was established in 1907 as a hardware store, by Albert Sammons, selling to construction crews of railroads and irrigation canals. His brother Thomas, along with Ted Hayes, created the Hayes-Sammons Hardware Company by 1912. By 1918, the company expanded to selling agriculture supplies such as pesticides and insecticides; by 1933, they made their own brand of pesticide for citrus, advertising it as stronger than other pesticides on the market.

In the early 1940s, Thomas Sammons Jr.—son of the aforementioned Thomas—and Clay Brazeal—a son-in-law and the husband of Thomas' sister, who served on Moore Air Force Base and had a degree in entomology from Texas A&M University—bought the company and kept the name. They expanded their market north and into Mexico. In 1951, they renamed it to the Hayes-Sammons Chemical Company, and continued expansion southward, across South America, and parts of the Middle East. The company split, with Sammon taking the hardware side and Brazeal taking the chemical side, as well as the warehouse itself. He renamed it to the Mission Chemical Company; it went bankrupt in 1968 and Brazeal founded the Tex-Ag Company, continuing his chemical venture. In 1969, the plant was bought by the Helena Chemical Company, who kept the Hayes-Sammons name. In 1996, Tex-Ag was bought by the Wilbur-Ellis Company of California.

=== Contamination ===
Throughout the 1950s and 1960s, both Sammons and Helena employed Mexican immigrants, who synthesized toxins unsuited. Meanwhile, toxins—including Agent Orange, calcium cyanide, chlordane, DDT, parathion and toxaphene—stored between two warehouses leased by Union Pacific Railroad entered the surrounding air, rainwater and soil. In 1979, because of a complaint, the EPA, along with the Texas Natural Resource Conservation Commission, searched the facility and the surrounding area. The EPA found toxins, and tore down the building. From suggestion of the Texas Commission of Environmental Quality in 1986, it was declared a Superfund site in 1987—making it one of the first Superfund sites in Texas, and cleanup occurred from January 1988 to March 1996. It is currently pending deletion from the Superfund registry.

In 1999, 2,500 people—90 dismissed and 450 dead—sued the companies for causing miscarriages, cancers, birth defects and premature deaths, among other health problems. The plaintiffs won, and between two settlements, the companies were ordered to pay $4–$6,000,000 and $5–$8,000,000 in restitution, respectively, as well as being ordered to excavate and properly dispose of 1,700 cubic yards (1.3×10^{−6} km^{3}) of toxified soil. On July 31, 2023, the final restitution payments were paid off.

== See also ==
- List of Superfund sites in Texas
