= Mission High School (Mission, Texas) =

Location
- 1802 Cleo Dawson; Mission, Texas 78572; United States; 26°13′23″N 98°19′46″W

Information
- Type: Public
- Opened: 1920s
- Principal: Colt Mejia
- Faculty: 169.64 (FTE)
- Enrollment: 2,209 (2023-2024)
- Student to teacher ratio: 13.02
- Colors: Maroon; White
- Nickname: Bald Eagles
- Website: School website

Mission High School is a secondary school located in Mission, Texas. It is a part of the Mission Consolidated Independent School District.

It serves sections of Mission, Palmhurst, and Alton, as well as the Mission CISD portion of the unincorporated area of West Sharyland.

For many years, Mission High School was the city's only high school. As of 2011, it competed in the 5-A Texas classification was home to some 2,200 students. At its peak, it was home to over 4,000 students before MCISD split the Mission High School attendance zone into two, with the addition of Veterans Memorial High School.

Mission High students were victims of the September 21, 1989 Alton, Texas bus crash; the students' school bus, also carrying students to Mission Junior High, fell into a caliche pit after a collision with a truck, causing 21 deaths.

== Notable alumni ==
- Tom Landry, Hall of Fame head coach of the Dallas Cowboys
- Koy Detmer, Pro Football Player, Philadelphia Eagles
