= Tres Barrera =

American baseball player (born 1994)

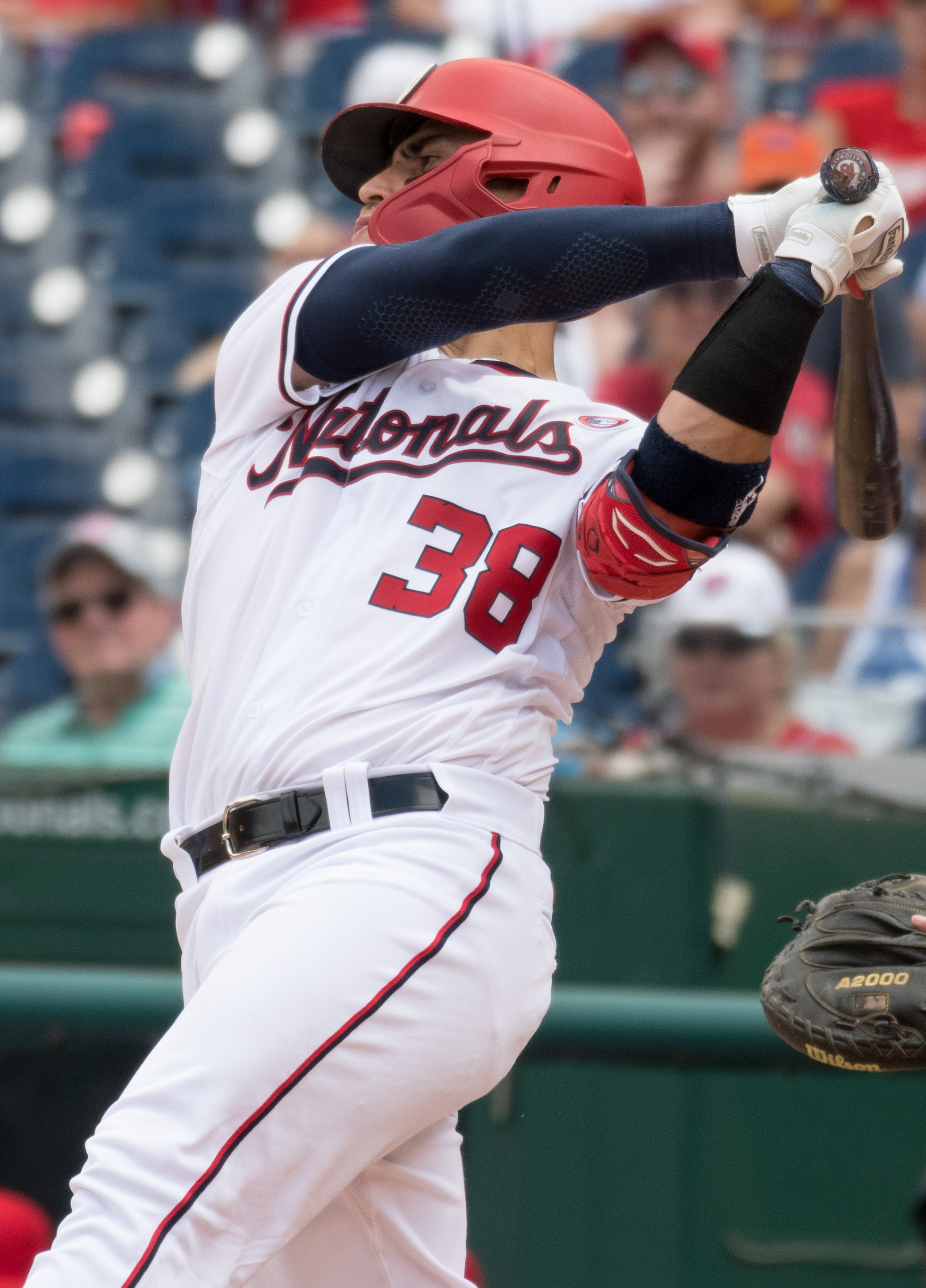
- Hitting Coach at Lamar University
- Assistant Coach
- Born: September 15, 1994 (age 31); Eagle Pass, Texas, U.S.
- Batted: Right Threw: Right

MLB debut
- September 14, 2019, for the Washington Nationals

Last MLB appearance
- May 24, 2023, for the St. Louis Cardinals

MLB statistics
- Batting average: .228
- Home runs: 2
- Runs batted in: 14
- Stats at Baseball Reference

Teams
- Washington Nationals (2019, 2021–2022); St. Louis Cardinals (2023)

Felipe Jesus "Tres" Barrera III (born September 15, 1994) is an American former professional baseball catcher. He played in Major League Baseball (MLB) for the Washington Nationals and St. Louis Cardinals from 2019 to 2023.

== Early life and amateur career ==
Barrera was born in Eagle Pass, Texas and grew up there until his family moved to the Rio Grande Valley when he was ten years old. He attended Sharyland High School, where he played both football and baseball. He played college baseball at the University of Texas. In 2014, he played collegiate summer baseball with the Cotuit Kettleers of the Cape Cod Baseball League, and returned to the league in 2015 to play for the Orleans Firebirds. As a junior, Barrera was named honorable mention All-Big 12 Conference after batting .289 with six home runs, 17 doubles, 35 runs scored and 37 runs batted in.

== Professional career ==
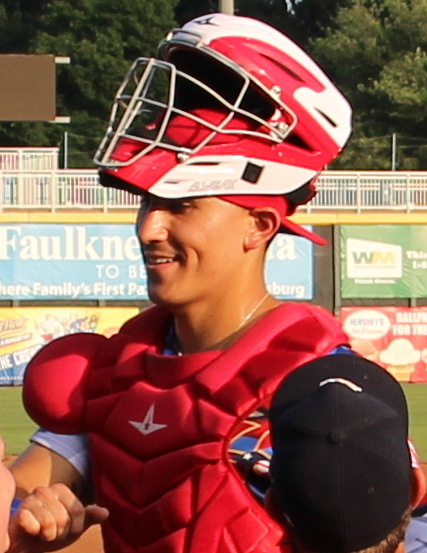
Barrera with the Harrisburg Senators in 2019

=== Washington Nationals ===
==== Minor leagues ====
Barrera was drafted in the 6th round (184th overall) by the Washington Nationals in the 2016 MLB draft. After signing with the Nationals he was assigned to the Auburn Doubledays of Low–A New York–Penn League, where he hit .244 with three home runs and 17 RBIs in 48 games. He batted .278 with eight home runs and 27 RBIs and 28 runs scored in 67 games the following season for Hagerstown Suns of the Single–A South Atlantic League, although his playing time was limited due to a broken finger on his throwing hand. He spent the 2018 season with the High–A Potomac Nationals, slashing .263/.334/.386 with six home runs, 36 runs scored and 24 driven in and was named a Carolina League All-Star. He was selected by the Nationals to play in the Arizona Fall League for Salt River Rafters after the end of the season. Barrera participated in 2019 spring training as a member of the Major League camp, but was assigned to the Double-A Harrisburg Senators for the season, hitting .249/.323/.381/.704 with 8 home runs and 46 RBI.

==== Major Leagues ====
The Nationals selected Barrera's contract on September 8, 2019. He made his Major League debut on September 14, 2019, against the Atlanta Braves, lining out in a pinch-hit at bat. Barrera played in two games with the Nationals in 2019, going hitless in two at-bats. The Nationals finished with a 93–69 record in 2019, good enough to clinch a wild card spot. Barrera did not take part in any postseason action as the Nationals went on to win the World Series over the Houston Astros, their first in franchise history.

On July 24, 2020, Barrera was suspended 80 games for testing positive for dehydrochlormethyltestosterone. He appealed the decision and his suspension was reduced to the duration of the 2020 season, after which he was reinstated from the restricted list.

On July 19, 2021, Barrera hit his first MLB home run for the Nationals, a solo blast off of Miami Marlins pitcher Ross Detwiler. Appearing in 30 games for Washington in 2021, Barrera logged a .264/.374/.385 batting line with 2 home runs and 10 RBI.

In 2022, Barrera appeared in 19 games for the Nationals, batting .180/.212/.200 with no home runs and 4 RBI. The majority of his season was spent with the Triple-A Rochester Red Wings, where he slashed .254/.338/.424 with 7 home runs and 25 RBI. On November 10, 2022, Barrera was removed from the 40-man roster and sent outright to Triple–A; he elected free agency the same day.

=== St. Louis Cardinals ===
On January 20, 2023, Barrera signed a minor league contract with the St. Louis Cardinals organization. He began the year with the Triple-A Memphis Redbirds, playing in 12 games and hitting .255/.314/.532 with 4 home runs and 15 RBI. On May 6, Barrera had his contract selected to the active roster. He appeared in 6 games for the Cardinals, going hitless in two at-bats. On June 3, Barrera was designated for assignment by St. Louis. He cleared waivers and was sent outright to Triple–A Memphis on June 7. On October 13, Barrera elected free agency.

=== Toros de Tijuana ===
On February 19, 2024, Barrera signed with the Toros de Tijuana of the Mexican League. In 50 appearances for Tijuana, he batted .258/.333/.421 with six home runs and 31 RBI. Barrera became a free agent following the season.

=== Tampa Bay Rays ===
On February 7, 2025, Barrera signed a minor league contract with the Tampa Bay Rays. He made 70 appearances split between the Double-A Montgomery Biscuits and Triple-A Durham Bulls, batting a combined .209/.299/.332 with eight home runs and 33 RBI. Barrera elected free agency following the season on November 6.

=== Washington Nationals (second stint) ===
On January 22, 2026, Barrera reunited with his original team as the Washington Nationals signed him to a minor league contract, and invited him to spring training. He made 16 appearances for the Triple-A Rochester Red Wings, hitting .255/.400/.340 with one home run, eight RBI, and one stolen base. On June 22, Barrera retired from professional baseball.

== Personal ==
Barrera is of Mexican descent and is fluent in both English and Spanish.

Barrera's wife, Lindsey, gave birth to the couple's first child, a son, in 2020, but he died the same day. Their daughter was born in 2022.
