= Palmhurst, Texas =

- City
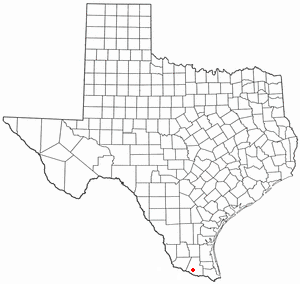
- Location of Palmhurst, Texas

- Coordinates: 26°15′3″N 98°18′27″W
- Country: United States of America
- State: Texas
- County: Hidalgo

Area
  - Total: 4.45 sq mi (11.52 km^{2})
  - Land: 4.45 sq mi (11.52 km^{2})
  - Water: 0 sq mi (0.00 km^{2})
- Elevation: 161 ft (49 m)

Population (2020)
  - Total: 2,601
  - Density: 614.4/sq mi (237.24/km^{2})
- Time zone: UTC-6 (Central (CST))
  - Summer (DST): UTC-5 (CDT)
- ZIP code: 78573
- Area code: 956
- FIPS code: 48-54780
- GNIS feature ID: 1378825
- Website: cityofpalmhursttx.com

Palmhurst is a city in Hidalgo County, Texas, United States. As of the 2020 census, Palmhurst had a population of 2,601. It is part of the McAllen–Edinburg–Mission and Reynosa–McAllen metropolitan areas.

== History ==
The community was incorporated in 1966.

== Geography ==
Palmhurst is located in southern Hidalgo County at 26°15′3″N 98°18′27″W (26.250924, –98.307607). It is bordered to the north by Alton, to the west by West Sharyland, to the south by Mission, and to the east by McAllen. Downtown McAllen is 8 miles (13 km) to the southeast, and the Rio Grande, the international border with Mexico, is 7 miles (11 km) to the south. Texas State Highway 107 is the main road through the city.

According to the United States Census Bureau, Palmhurst has a total area of 4.6 square miles (11.8 km^{2}), all land. The elevation is 160 feet (49 m) above sea level.

== Demographics ==
Historical population
Census	Pop.	Note	%±
1970	120		—
1980	364		203.3%
1990	326		−10.4%
2000	4,872		1,394.5%
2010	2,607		−46.5%
2020	2,601		−0.2%
U.S. Decennial Census

=== 2020 census ===
As of the 2020 census, Palmhurst had a population of 2,601. The median age was 41.3 years, with 24.1% of residents under the age of 18 and 16.0% 65 years of age or older. For every 100 females there were 100.4 males, and for every 100 females age 18 and over there were 97.9 males age 18 and over.

100.0% of residents lived in urban areas, while 0.0% lived in rural areas.

There were 831 households in Palmhurst, of which 43.7% had children under the age of 18 living in them. Of all households, 65.6% were married-couple households, 13.0% were households with a male householder and no spouse or partner present, and 18.5% were households with a female householder and no spouse or partner present. About 10.2% of all households were made up of individuals and 5.2% had someone living alone who was 65 years of age or older.

There were 1,188 housing units, of which 30.1% were vacant. The homeowner vacancy rate was 0.7% and the rental vacancy rate was 56.8%.

Racial composition as of the 2020 census
Race	Number	Percent
White	984	37.8%
Black or African American	11	0.4%
American Indian and Alaska Native	5	0.2%
Asian	45	1.7%
Native Hawaiian and Other Pacific Islander	0	0.0%
Some other race	367	14.1%
Two or more races	1,189	45.7%
Hispanic or Latino (of any race)	2,135	82.1%

=== 2000 census ===
As of the 2000 census, there were 4,872 people, 1,226 households, and 1,110 families residing in the city. The population density was 804.0 inhabitants per square mile (310.4/km^{2}). There were 1,739 housing units at an average density of 287.0 per square mile (110.8/km^{2}). The racial makeup of the city was 84.67% White, 0.25% African American, 0.25% Native American, 0.39% Asian, 13.71% from other races, and 0.74% from two or more races. Hispanic or Latino of any race were 87.48% of the population.

There were 1,226 households, out of which 60.3% had children under the age of 18 living with them, 76.2% were married couples living together, 11.7% had a female householder with no husband present, and 9.4% were non-families. 7.3% of all households were made up of individuals, and 2.0% had someone living alone who was 65 years of age or older. The average household size was 3.97 and the average family size was 4.18.

In the city, the population was spread out, with 38.9% under the age of 18, 10.1% from 18 to 24, 29.5% from 25 to 44, 16.8% from 45 to 64, and 4.7% who were 65 years of age or older. The median age was 26 years. For every 100 females, there were 94.0 males. For every 100 females age 18 and over, there were 89.9 males.

The median income for a household in the city was $22,847, and the median income for a family was $24,549. Males had a median income of $27,500 versus $21,833 for females. The per capita income for the city was $11,275. About 35.6% of families and 37.9% of the population were below the poverty line, including 48.6% of those under age 18 and 20.4% of those age 65 or over.

However, over the past decade, the city lost nearly half its population as many low-income families in small homes moved out and were replaced by a smaller number of upscale residents. According to Onboard Informatics, by 2013 the median household income in Palmhurst had risen to $77,491, making it one of the wealthiest communities in South Texas. The demographics of Palmhurst have changed dramatically since 2000, as shown on the city-data.com website.

== Education ==
Much of Palmhurst is served by Mission Consolidated Independent School District. The eastern portion is served by the Sharyland Independent School District.

Most of the Mission CISD part is zoned to Hurla M. Midkiff Elementary School in Palmhurst, while small sections are zoned to Waitz Elementary in Alton and Escobar/Rios Elementary in an unincorporated area. Students zoned to Midkiff are zoned to R. Cantu Junior High School in Palmhurst. Students zoned to Escobar/Rios and Waitz are zoned to Alton Memorial Junior High School in Alton. Sections of Palmhurst are zoned to Mission High School and Veterans Memorial High School in Mission.

The Sharyland ISD section of Palmhurst is divided between John H. Shary Elementary School in Mission, Donna Wernecke Elementary School in McAllen, and Jessie L. Jensen Elementary School in Alton. All residents are zoned to North Junior High School in McAllen and Sharyland Pioneer High School in unincorporated Hidalgo County.

In addition, South Texas Independent School District operates magnet schools that serve the community.
