= John J. Conway =

American businessman

John Conway founded the city of Mission, Texas in 1907 with J. W. Holt when the two purchased the 17,000-acre (6,900 ha) La Lomita Ranch from the Oblate fathers. Subdivided parcels were sold to arriving settlers and water was pumped from the Rio Grande by means of a pumping station called the First Lift Station and distributed to the residents of the Rio Grande Valley through the Mission Canal Co. Irrigation System, also started by Conway and Holt.
