= Ana Liz Pulido =

Mexican-American chef and restaurateur

- Born: 1997 or 1998 (age 27–28); San Juan, Texas
- Education: Culinary Institute of America, San Antonio
- Culinary career
- Current restaurant: Ana Liz Taqueria
- Award won: James Beard Foundation Award: Best Chef: Texas (2024)

Ana Liz Pulido is a Mexican-American chef and restaurateur. In 2024 she won the James Beard Foundation Award for Best Chef: Texas.

== Early life and education ==
Pulido grew up in Mexico, where her father, Armando, owned two taquerias and a hotel in Reynosa, Mexico, and in the United States. As a teenager she sold chamoyadas, marranadas, crepes, and chorreados at a walk-up space, which she name Aliz, near one of her father's restaurants. In the Rio Grande Valley, she sold Nutella pies to classmates until administrators at her high school shut down the business; she promptly moved it off campus.

Pulido attended the Culinary Institute of America in San Antonio, graduating in 2019. She did an externship at Pappasito’s Cantina.

== Career ==
After graduating from culinary school, Pulido worked in a restaurant at Tower of the Americas, after which she found space in a shopping center and renovated it into a restaurant.

Pulido owns Ana Liz Taqueria in Mission, Texas in the Rio Grande Valley region, which she opened in 2021. As of 2024 the restaurant has only five tables. After her tortilla supplier moved from the area, Pulido learned how to make her own from scratch, including nixtamalization of the corn. Texas Monthly called the restaurant "pilgrimage-worthy", crediting the tortillas and the tacos from which they're made.

== Recognition ==
In 2024 Pulido won the James Beard Foundation Award for Best Chef: Texas. In 2023 she was a semifinalist in the same category.

== Personal life ==
Pulido lives in Mission, Texas.
