= Veterans Memorial High School (Mission, Texas) =

Coordinates: 26.2419°N 98.3152°W

Information
- Established: 2002; 24 years ago

Veterans Memorial High School is a senior high school in Mission, Texas and a part of the Mission Consolidated Independent School District. It was made in 2002 and had the first graduation in 2004. It serves sections of Mission, Alton, and Palmhurst.
