= Jorge Cantú =

Mexican-American baseball player (born 1982)

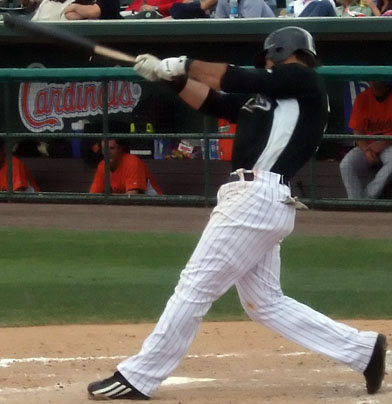
- Cantú with the Florida Marlins
- Infielder
- Born: January 30, 1982 (age 44); McAllen, Texas, U.S.
- Batted: Right Threw: Right

Professional debut
- MLB: July 17, 2004, for the Tampa Bay Devil Rays
- KBO: March 29, 2014, for the Doosan Bears

Last appearance
- MLB: June 14, 2011, for the San Diego Padres
- KBO: October 17, 2014, for the Doosan Bears

MLB statistics
- Batting average: .271
- Home runs: 104
- Runs batted in: 476

KBO statistics
- Batting average: .309
- Home runs: 18
- Runs batted in: 72
- Stats at Baseball Reference

Teams
- Tampa Bay Devil Rays (2004–2007); Cincinnati Reds (2007); Florida Marlins (2008–2010); Texas Rangers (2010); San Diego Padres (2011); Doosan Bears (2014)

Jorge Luís Cantú Guzmán (born January 30, 1982) is an American-born Mexican former professional baseball infielder. He played in Major League Baseball (MLB) for the Tampa Bay Devil Rays, Cincinnati Reds, Florida Marlins, Texas Rangers, and San Diego Padres, and in the KBO League for the Doosan Bears.

Cantú bats and throws right-handed. He was born in McAllen, Texas and went to Sharyland High School, but was raised and makes his home in Reynosa, Tamaulipas, Mexico.

== Career ==
=== Tampa Bay Devil Rays ===
Cantú was spotted by a scout while playing in a Junior Olympic tournament in Mexico City while in high school, and offered a contract with the Tampa Bay Devil Rays at age 16. In 2003, Cantú played for the Mexico national team in the regional Olympic qualifying tournament. His team defeated the U.S. team, eliminating them from the 2004 summer games in Athens.

Cantú made his major league debut with the Tampa Bay Devil Rays in the 2004 season, batting .301 with two home runs and 17 runs batted in in 50 games played.

In 2005, Cantú began the season expecting to play a utilityman role, but due to the retirement of second baseman Roberto Alomar during spring training, he became the full-time second baseman. He showcased his talents, having a breakout year, and was named the Devil Rays Most Valuable Player by Tampa Bay sportswriters, after hitting .289 with 28 home runs, 117 RBIs, 40 doubles, and 171 hits in 150 games (80 at second base, 63 at third). Cantú was a valuable young player for the rebuilding Devil Rays, who finished last in the American League that season.

In 2006 however, he had a down year as he struggled with injuries. His production from the previous year dropped precipitously, as he hit just .249 with 14 home runs and 62 RBIs.

The following season, he failed to make the Opening Day 25-man roster for 2007, and was assigned instead to the Triple-A Durham Bulls. He threatened not to report, and demanded a trade. However, on the April 4, 2007, edition of ESPN's Baseball Tonight, Cantú retracted his trade demand and said he would voluntarily report to Durham. He hit just .207 with zero home runs and 4 RBIs in 25 games with Tampa Bay that year.

=== Cincinnati Reds ===
On July 28, 2007, Cantú was traded to the Cincinnati Reds along with minor league outfielder Shaun Cumberland for pitchers Brian Shackelford and Calvin Medlock. With the Reds, he hit .298 with 1 home run and 9 RBI. During the 2007 season, he played primarily first base (as opposed to second base) as he played 21 games at first base, 2 games at second base and one game at third base (combined with Tampa Bay and Cincinnati). The Reds released him during the offseason on December 5 of that year.

=== Florida Marlins ===
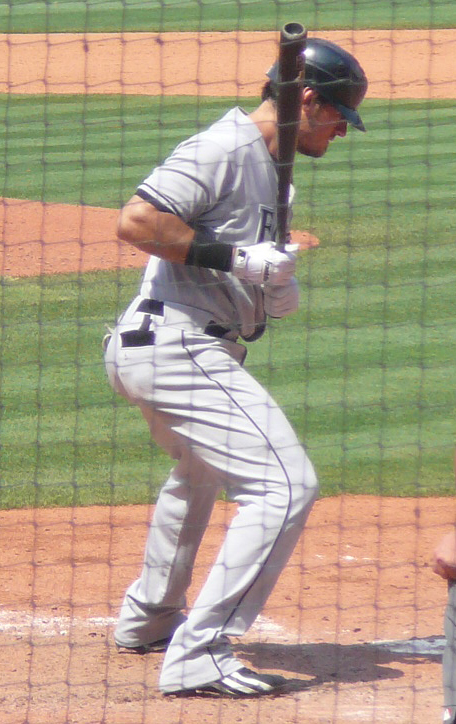
Cantù with the Marlins in 2008

On January 4, 2008, the Florida Marlins signed Cantú to a minor league contract with an invitation to spring training. On March 22, Jose Castillo was claimed off waivers by the San Francisco Giants, opening the door for a possible roster spot for Cantú. Cantú was added to the active roster on March 27. Cantú impressed the Marlins so much during spring training that he was named the team's starting third baseman. He spent the season hitting third in the Marlins lineup. On September 12, Cantú hit his 25th home run of the season joining Hanley Ramírez, Dan Uggla, and Mike Jacobs as the first group of infielders on the same team to have 25 or more home runs. Cantú finished the year with a career high 29 home runs, 95 RBI, and a .277 batting Average.

In the offseason Cantú signed a 1-year, $4.5 million contract, avoiding arbitration. After spring training 2009, the Marlins announced that they would shift Cantú to first base after Gaby Sánchez struggled in the spring, and Emilio Bonifacio would play third base.

Cantú's left wrist was injured during the third game of the 2009 season and he was forced to miss five games. He played well after returning to the lineup despite lingering pain. On May 4, he was named the National League Player of the Week.

Cantú started the 2010 season with a 21-game hitting streak Cantú hit his 100th career home run on June 23, 2010.

=== Texas Rangers ===
On July 29, 2010, Cantú was dealt to the Texas Rangers (with $600,000 cash) for Evan Reed and Omar Poveda.

Though he was a good home run and RBI hitter when in Florida, Cantú did not hit a single home run or RBI in his first 83 plate appearances for the Rangers. However, on September 25, he got his first RBI, and later his first home run, the latter giving his team a 4–3 lead, which turned out to be the final score, clinching the Rangers' their first divisional title since 1999.

That year he played in the World Series with the Rangers.

=== San Diego Padres ===
Cantú signed a one-year deal with the San Diego Padres on January 26, 2011. He was designated for assignment on June 15 after hitting just .194/.232/.285 in 57 games and was released on June 21.

=== Colorado Rockies ===
On July 30, 2011, Jorge Cantú was signed by the Colorado Rockies to a minor league contract. He played in 30 games for the Colorado Springs Sky Sox but was never called up to the Majors and elected free agency on November 2, 2011.

=== Los Angeles Angels of Anaheim ===
On January 6, 2012, Cantù signed a minor league contract with the Los Angeles Angels of Anaheim. He played in 24 games for the Triple-A Salt Lake Bees before he was released on April 30, 2012.

=== Tigres de Quintana Roo ===
On March 20, 2013, Cantú signed with the Tigres de Quintana Roo of the Mexican League. Due to an injury he was limited throughout the season but still led the team with 31 Home Runs in 83 games. He played first base and DH, leading the team to a Championship.

=== Doosan Bears ===
On December 9, 2013, Cantú signed a $250,000 contract with the Doosan Bears of the Korea Baseball Organization that included a $50,000 signing bonus. In 111 games for Doosan, Cantú slashed .309/.375/.524 with 18 home runs and 72 RBI. He became a free agent after the season.

=== Tigres de Quintana Roo (second stint) ===
On April 2, 2015, Cantú re-signed with the Tigres and led Quintana Roo to another title run. During the season, he won a Home Run Derby Title and was an All-Star. This year saw a slight decline in home runs, hitting just 25 for the year, but finishing up with 100 RBI's for the regular season with 75 runs in 106 games played.

=== Toros de Tijuana ===
Cantú was traded to the Toros de Tijuana on June 20, 2016. Cantú struggled in 23 games for Tijuana in 2016, batting just .195/.264/.244 in 91 plate appearances. In 2017, Cantú slashed .282/.370/.452 with 12 home runs and 55 RBI in 99 games played. He appeared in 87 games for Tijuana in 2018, hitting 12 home runs with 58 RBI.

=== Diablos Rojos del México ===
On December 17, 2018, Cantú was traded to the Diablos Rojos del México of the Mexican League. In 2019, Cantú batted .283/.364/.488 with 12 homers and 38 RBI in 74 games played. Cantú did not play in a game in 2020 due to the cancellation of the LMB season because of the COVID-19 pandemic.

Cantú played in 36 games for México in 2021, batting .240/.313/.306 with 1 home run and 13 RBI. He fell on harder times in 2022, slumping to a .192/.236/.258 line with 1 home run and 8 RBI in an abbreviated stint of 23 games with the team. On January 12, 2023, Cantú retired from professional baseball.
