= Mission Consolidated Independent School District =

School district in Texas, United States

Address
- 1201 Bryce Drive Mission, Texas, 78572; United States

District information
- Grades: PK–12
- Schools: 24
- NCES District ID: 4831040

Students and staff
- Students: 14,068 (2023–2024)
- Teachers: 971.61 (on an FTE basis)
- Student–teacher ratio: 14.48:1

Other information
- Website: www.mcisd.net

Mission Consolidated Independent School District is a public school district based in Mission, Texas (USA), in the lower Rio Grande Valley.

In addition to most of Mission, the district serves most of Alton and part of Palmhurst, as well as a portion of West Sharyland census-designated place. It serves what was previously the CDP of Alton North.

In 2009, the school district was rated "academically acceptable" by the Texas Education Agency.

== History ==
On July 10, 1910 the district was established.

On January 27, 1975, the Alton Independent School District consolidated into the Mission school district. As a result, the district received its current name.

On the morning of September 21, 1989, the Alton bus crash occurred; one of the school district's buses was struck by a Dr. Pepper truck owned and operated by Valley Coca-Cola, in Alton, Texas. After impact with the truck, the school bus left the roadway and plunged into a caliche pit filled with water. Twenty-one students died in the accident and another sixty were injured. Alton Memorial Junior High School was named after this tragedy to remember the lost twenty-one students.

In 1998 96% of the district's students were Hispanic, and many had limited English proficiency. That year, the district tested 77% of its elementary school students for the Texas Assessment of Knowledge and Skills (TAKS) test. Victor Benavidez, the district's director of assessment, said "If we really wanted to play the game and exempt 5 percent more, then we could easily be exemplary. But we'd rather not. I think there is more respect from the community if you are testing more kids, even though your ratings are a little lower."

== Schools ==
=== High Schools (Grades 9-12) ===
Zoned:

- Mission High
- Veterans Memorial High School

Alternative:

- Mission Collegiate High School (Alton)

=== Junior High Schools (Grades 6-8) ===
- Alton Memorial Junior High School (AMJHS) - Alton
- Rafael Cantu Junior High
- Kenneth White Junior High
- Mission Junior High

=== Elementary Schools (Grades PK-5) ===
- Alton Elementary
- Bryan Elementary
- Cantu Elementary
- Castro Elementary
- Cavazos Elementary
- Escobar Rios Elementary
- Leal Elementary
- Marcell Elementary
- Midkiff Elementary
- Mims Elementary
  - 2005 National Blue Ribbon School
- O'Grady Elementary
- Pearson Elementary
- Salinas Elementary
- Waitz Elementary

== Former schools ==
- Wilson Migrant School - Closed in 1975.
