= Sharyland Independent School District =

School district in Texas, United States

Address
- 1200 North Shary Road Mission, Texas, USA ESC Region 1
- Coordinates: 26°12′47″N 98°17′15″W

District information
- Type: Independent School District
- Motto: Excellence Is Our Tradition!
- Grades: PK-12
- Established: March 10, 1921; 105 years ago
- Superintendent: Dr. Elaine Howard
- Governing agency: Texas Education Agency
- Schools: 14
- NCES District ID: 4839930

Students and staff
- Students: 9,658 (2025-2026)

Other information
- Website: www.sharylandisd.org

Sharyland Independent School District (Sharyland ISD or SISD) is a public school district based in Mission, Texas, United States.

Covering approximately 26 square miles inHidalgo County, the district serves parts of Mission, McAllen, Palmhurst, and Alton.

As of 2026, Sharyland ISD operates 14 campuses, including 2 high schools, 2 junior high schools, 8 elementary schools, 1 advanced academic academy, and 1 alternative education center. The district most recently received a "B" rating from the Texas Education Agency (TEA).

== History ==
As of 1984, Sharyland ISD had 2,075 students and 4 campuses: Sharyland High School (grades 9-12), B.L. Gray Junior High School (6-8), Sharyland Elementary School I (K-3), and the newly opened Sharyland Elementary School II (4-5).

In 1988, the district surpassed 2,500 total students. Pre-kindergarten (PK) was added to Sharyland ES-I this year, before 3rd grade moved to Sharyland ES-II in 1989. Sharyland ES-I became Sharyland Primary School in 1991, when Sharyland ES-II changed to Sharyland Intermediate School. The district surpassed 3,000 student this year. In 1993, 6th grade moved to Sharyland Intermediate (now 3-6).

When Sharyland Central Primary School opened with grades 3-4 in 1995, Sharyland Intermediate reconfigured to serve only grades 5-6. The three elementary campuses were renamed in 1996 and realigned to serve PK-6, with Sharyland Primary becoming John H. Shary Elementary, Sharyland Intermediate changing to Olvero Garza Sr. Elementary, and Central Primary becoming Jesse L. Jensen Elementary. This was also the year enrollment surpassed 4,000 students. 6th grade was also moved from the elementary level back to the junior high in 1996.

The district enrolled 5,000 students in 1999. With the opening of Romulo D. Martinez Elementary School in 2000, 6th grade moved back to the elementary school level. District enrollment exceeded 6,000 students in 2002, and Ruben Hinojosa Elementary School opened in 2003. The fast growth continued, with the district enrolling over 7,000 students by 2005. This was the year Sharyland North Junior High School and Llyod & Dolly Bentsen Elementary School opened. District enrollment crossed 8,000 in 2007, as Harry Shimotsu and Donna Wernecke Elementary Schools opened.

Enrollment continued to surge, passing 9,000 in 2009 and 10,000 in 2012. Sharyland Pioneer High School opened in 2014 with grades 9-12. Sharyland Advanced Academic Academy also opened this year. The majority of seniors chose to remain at Sharyland High for their final year of high school. District growth plateaued in 2019 with 10,285 students before losing enrollment over the next several years.

== Schools ==
=== High schools (grades 9-12) ===
Name	Established	Mascot	Colors	Additional information
Sharyland High School	1921	Rattlers	Red & White	
Sharyland Pioneer High School	2014	Diamondbacks	Red, Gray, & White	
Sharyland Advanced Academic Academy	2014	Cobras	Red, Gray, & Navy	

=== Junior high schools (grades 7-8) ===
Name	Established	Mascot	Colors	Additional information
B.L. Gray Junior High School	1981	Rattlers	Red & White	
Sharyland North Junior High School	2005	Diamondbacks	Red, Gray, & White	

=== Elementary schools (grades PK-6) ===
Name	Established	Additional information
Lloyd & Dolly Bentsen Elementary	2005	
Olivero Garza Sr. Elementary	1984	Has had current name since 1996
Ruben Hinojosa Elementary	2003	
Jessie L. Jensen Elementary	1995	Originally Sharyland Central ES from 1995-96
Romulo D. Martinez Elementary	2000	
John H. Shary Elementary	Unknown	Has had current name since 1996
Harry Shimotsu Elementary	2007	
Donna Wernecke Elementary	2007	
