= Alton, Texas =

- City
- Interactive map of Alton, Texas
- Coordinates: 26°17′4″N 98°18′21″W
- Country: United States of America
- State: Texas
- County: Hidalgo
- Incorporated: 1978

Area
  - Total: 7.31 sq mi (18.94 km^{2})
  - Land: 7.31 sq mi (18.93 km^{2})
  - Water: 0.0039 sq mi (0.01 km^{2})
- Elevation: 161 ft (49 m)

Population (2020)
  - Total: 18,198
  - Density: 2,490/sq mi (961.3/km^{2})
- Time zone: UTC-6 (Central (CST))
  - Summer (DST): UTC-5 (CDT)
- ZIP code: 78573
- Area code: 956
- FIPS code: 48-02212
- GNIS feature ID: 1329468
- Website: www.alton-tx.gov

Alton is a city in Hidalgo County, Texas, United States. The population was 18,198 at the 2020 census.

== History ==
Alton was founded in 1910 or 1911 by citizens and railroad officials of Alton, Illinois.

On September 21, 1989, the Alton bus crash occurred; a Dr. Pepper truck hit a Mission Consolidated Independent School District school bus and caused it to fall into a caliche pit, killing 21 students.

== Geography ==
Alton is located at 26°17′4″N 98°18′21″W (26.284307, −98.305940). It is bordered to the south by Palmhurst and to the north and east by McAllen, although downtown McAllen is 10 miles (16 km) southeast of Alton. It is about 70 miles (110 km) north of Brownsville.

According to the United States Census Bureau, Alton has a total area of 7.31 square miles (18.94 km^{2}), of which 0.003 square miles (0.008 km^{2}), or 0.04%, are water.

== Demographics ==
Historical population
Census	Pop.	Note	%±
1980	2,732		—
1990	3,069		12.3%
2000	4,384		42.8%
2010	12,341		181.5%
2020	18,198		47.5%
U.S. Decennial Census

Alton is part of the McAllen–Edinburg–Mission and Reynosa–McAllen metropolitan areas.

=== 2020 census ===
As of the 2020 census, Alton had a population of 18,198 people, 5,005 households, and 3,959 families. The median age was 28.0 years; 33.4% of residents were under the age of 18 and 8.8% were 65 years of age or older. For every 100 females there were 94.8 males, and for every 100 females age 18 and over there were 89.3 males.

100.0% of residents lived in urban areas, while 0% lived in rural areas.

Of the 5,005 households, 55.4% had children under the age of 18 living in them. Of all households, 50.8% were married-couple households, 14.2% were households with a male householder and no spouse or partner present, and 29.0% were households with a female householder and no spouse or partner present. About 12.1% of all households were made up of individuals and 4.8% had someone living alone who was 65 years of age or older.

There were 5,327 housing units, of which 6.0% were vacant. Among occupied housing units, 62.6% were owner-occupied and 37.4% were renter-occupied. The homeowner vacancy rate was 0.6% and the rental vacancy rate was 7.0%.

Alton racial composition (NH = Non-Hispanic) (Note: Note: the US Census treats Hispanic/Latino as an ethnic category. This table excludes Latinos from the racial categories and assigns them to a separate category. Hispanics/Latinos can be of any race.)
Race	Number	Percentage
White (NH)	439	2.41%
Black or African American (NH)	47	0.26%
Native American or Alaska Native (NH)	5	0.03%
Asian (NH)	22	0.12%
Some Other Race (NH)	27	0.15%
Mixed/Multi-Racial (NH)	12	0.07%
Hispanic or Latino	17,646	96.97%
Total	18,198	

Racial composition as of the 2020 census
Race	Percent
White	31.1%
Black or African American	0.4%
American Indian and Alaska Native	0.8%
Asian	0.1%
Native Hawaiian and Other Pacific Islander	<0.1%
Some other race	21.6%
Two or more races	46.0%
Hispanic or Latino (of any race)	97.0%

=== 2000 census ===
As of the census of 2000, there were 4,384 people, 1,059 households, and 988 families residing in the city. The population density was 2,075.5 inhabitants per square mile (801.4/km^{2}). There were 1,175 housing units at an average density of 556.3 per square mile (214.8/km^{2}). The racial makeup of the city was 79.33% White, 0.05% African American, 0.32% Native American, 19.02% from other races, and 1.28% from two or more races. Hispanic or Latino of any race were 97.90% of the population.

There were 1,059 households, out of which 58.0% had children under the age of 18 living with them, 70.7% were married couples living together, 17.8% had a female householder with no husband present, and 6.7% were non-families. 6.2% of all households were made up of individuals, and 3.8% had someone living alone who was 65 years of age or older. The average household size was 4.14 and the average family size was 4.29.

In the city, the population was spread out, with 37.9% under the age of 18, 12.1% from 18 to 24, 28.7% from 25 to 44, 14.7% from 45 to 64, and 6.6% who were 65 years of age or older. The median age was 25 years. For every 100 females, there were 94.8 males. For every 100 females age 18 and over, there were 88.0 males.

The median income for a household in the city was $22,097, and the median income for a family was $23,563. Males had a median income of $18,487 versus $15,341 for females. The per capita income for the city was $6,230. About 38.7% of families and 42.7% of the population were below the poverty line, including 51.9% of those under age 18 and 39.3% of those age 65 or over.

== Education ==
Most of Alton is a part of the Mission Consolidated Independent School District. Small portions are within the Sharyland Independent School District and La Joya Independent School District.

Much of Alton was in the Alton Independent School District until January 27, 1975, when that district merged into Mission CISD.

In 2018 city manager Jorge Arcaute stated that some families moved to Alton specifically to put their children in the Mission CISD and Sharyland ISD schools.

All of Hidalgo County is in the service area of South Texas College.

=== Schools ===
Mission CISD operates the following elementary schools that serve sections of Alton:

- Alton Elementary School – Alton
- Arturo Cantu Elementary School – Alton
  - Named after Arturo Cantu, a Mission ISD teacher who in 1969 drowned in the Anzalduas Park after rescuing three of his students.
- Raquel Cavazos Elementary School – Alton
- Waitz Elementary School – Alton
- Hurla M. Midkiff Elementary School – Palmhurst
- Salinas Elementary School – annexed into the City of McAllen

Mission CISD operates Alton Memorial Junior High School, named in honor of the Mission CISD students who died in the 1989 bus crash, in Alton. Students zoned to Cantu, Cavazos, and Waitz elementaries are zoned to Alton Memorial, while those zoned to Alton Elementary, Midkiff, and Salinas are zoned to Rafael A. Cantu Junior High School in Palmhurst. Sections of Alton are zoned to Mission High School and Veterans Memorial High School in Mission.

There is a Mission CISD alternative high school: Mission Collegiate High School, in Alton. Sharyland ISD operates Jesse Jensen Elementary School in Alton. Sharyland ISD sections of Alton are zoned to Jensen, North Junior High School in McAllen, and Sharyland Pioneer High School in unincorporated Hidalgo County.

La Joya ISD operates Domingo Treviño Middle School in Alton. The sections of Alton in La Joya ISD are divided between:

- Diaz/Villareal Elementary School and Kika de la Garza Elementary School
- Treviño Middle and Memorial Middle School
- Juarez-Lincoln High School and Palmview High School

In addition, South Texas Independent School District operates magnet schools that serve the community.

== Parks and recreation ==
Josefa Garcia Park is in Alton. It previously had 5 acres (2.0 ha) of land. In 2018 Texas Parks and Wildlife Department (TPWD) gave a $500,000 grant to increase the park's size to 55 acres (22 ha). The park includes a memorial to the 1989 bus accident, with 21 crosses, one per deceased victim, and a statue of Jesus Christ.
