= Mission, Texas =

Mission
- City
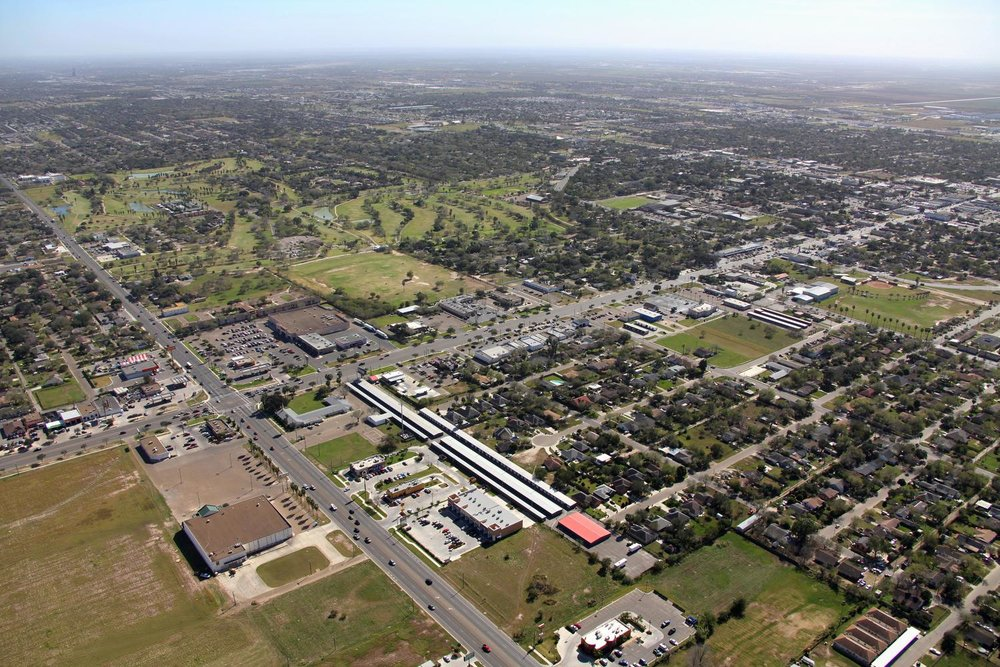
- Mission, Texas
- Motto: Home of the Grapefruit
- Location of Mission, Texas
- Coordinates: 26°12′41″N 98°19′17″W
- Country: United States
- State: Texas
- County: Hidalgo
- Founded: 1907
- Incorporated: 1910

Government
  - Type: Council-manager
  - City council: Mayor Norie Gonzalez Garza; Jessica Ortega Ochoa; Ruben Plata; Jose Alberto Vela; Abiel Flores
  - City manager: Mike Perez

Area
  - City: 36.39 sq mi (94.26 km^{2})
  - Land: 36.34 sq mi (94.11 km^{2})
  - Water: 0.069 sq mi (0.18 km^{2})
- Elevation: 141 ft (43 m)

Population (2020)
  - City: 85,778
  - Estimate (2022): 86,635
  - Rank: US: 403rd TX: 46th
  - Density: 2,384/sq mi (920.6/km^{2})
  - Urban: 779,553 (US: 56th)
  - Urban density: 2,390/sq mi (922.7/km^{2})
  - Metro: 888,367 (US: 65th)
- Time zone: UTC–6 (Central (CST))
  - Summer (DST): UTC–5 (CDT)
- ZIP codes: 78503, 78572, 78573, 78174
- Area code: 956
- FIPS code: 48-48768
- GNIS feature ID: 1341738
- Sales tax: 8.25%
- Website: missiontexas.us

Mission is a city in Hidalgo County, in the US state of Texas. Its population was 85,778 at the 2020 census and an estimated 86,635 in 2022. Mission is part of the McAllen–Edinburg–Mission and Reynosa–McAllen metropolitan areas.

== Geography ==
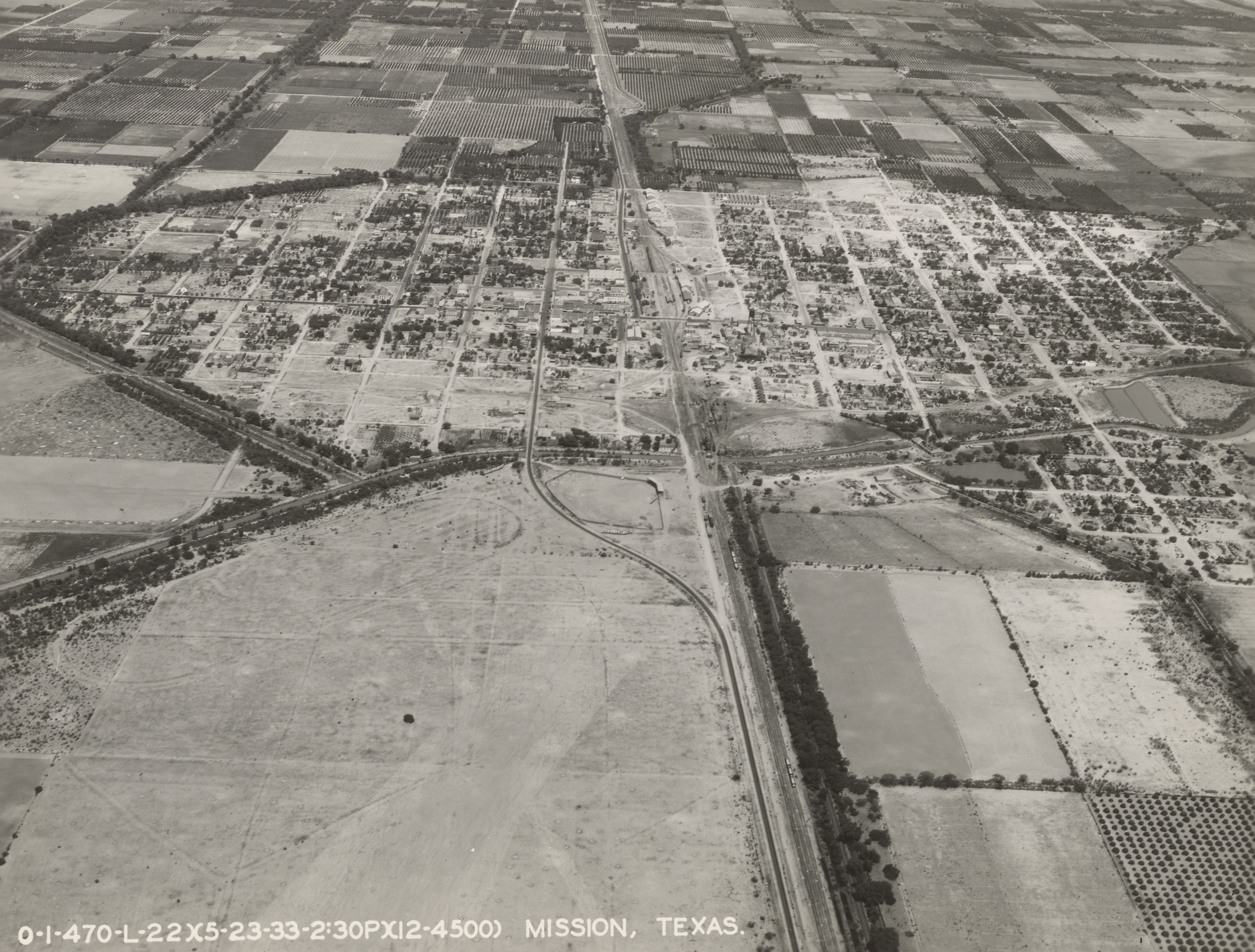
Mission in 1933

Mission is in southern Hidalgo County. It is bordered to the east by McAllen, the largest city in the county, to the north by Palmhurst, to the west by Palmview, and to the south by the Mexico–United States border along the Rio Grande.

The Interstate 2/U.S. Route 83 freeway passes through Mission, south of the center of town. The highway leads east 5 miles (8 km) to downtown McAllen and 41 miles (66 km) to Harlingen. Interstate 2 ends 7 miles (11 km) west of Mission; US 83 leads west 34 miles (55 km) to Rio Grande City.

According to the United States Census Bureau, Mission has a total area of 34.1 square miles (88.2 km^{2}), of which 0.1 sq mi (0.2 km^{2}), or 0.20%, is covered by water.

== Demographics ==
Historical population
Census	Pop.	Note	%±
1920	3,847		—
1930	5,120		33.1%
1940	5,982		16.8%
1950	2,940		−50.9%
1960	14,081		378.9%
1970	13,043		−7.4%
1980	22,589		73.2%
1990	31,100		37.7%
2000	45,408		46.0%
2010	77,058		69.7%
2020	85,778		11.3%
2022 (est.)	86,635		1.0%
U.S. Decennial Census; 2020 Census

=== Racial and ethnic composition ===
Mission city, Texas – Racial and ethnic composition Note: the US Census treats Hispanic/Latino as an ethnic category. This table excludes Latinos from the racial categories and assigns them to a separate category. Hispanics/Latinos may be of any race.
Race / Ethnicity (NH = Non-Hispanic)	Pop 2000	Pop 2010	Pop 2020	% 2000	% 2010	% 2020
White alone (NH)	8,033	9,465	7,625	17.69%	12.28%	8.89%
Black or African American alone (NH)	115	321	349	0.25%	0.42%	0.41%
Native American or Alaska Native alone (NH)	37	71	51	0.08%	0.09%	0.06%
Asian alone (NH)	266	1,135	1,232	0.59%	1.47%	1.44%
Pacific Islander alone (NH)	2	11	15	0.00%	0.01%	0.02%
Some other race alone (NH)	13	57	190	0.03%	0.07%	0.22%
Multiracial (NH)	148	186	360	0.33%	0.24%	0.42%
Hispanic or Latino (any race)	36,794	65,812	75,956	81.03%	85.41%	88.55%
Total	45,408	77,058	85,778	100.00%	100.00%	100.00%

=== 2020 census ===
As of the 2020 census, Mission had a population of 85,778. The median age was 34.0 years. 28.5% of residents were under the age of 18 and 14.0% of residents were 65 years of age or older. For every 100 females there were 93.2 males, and for every 100 females age 18 and over there were 89.4 males age 18 and over.

99.5% of residents lived in urban areas, while 0.5% lived in rural areas.

There were 27,165 households in Mission, of which 44.4% had children under the age of 18 living in them. Of all households, 53.9% were married-couple households, 14.5% were households with a male householder and no spouse or partner present, and 27.1% were households with a female householder and no spouse or partner present. About 18.0% of all households were made up of individuals and 8.9% had someone living alone who was 65 years of age or older.

There were 32,707 housing units, of which 16.9% were vacant. The homeowner vacancy rate was 1.6% and the rental vacancy rate was 10.1%.

Racial composition as of the 2020 census
Race	Number	Percentage
White	29,183	34.0%
Black or African American	514	0.6%
American Indian and Alaska Native	509	0.6%
Asian	1,278	1.5%
Native Hawaiian and Other Pacific Islander	30	0.0%
Some other race	16,667	19.4%
Two or more races	37,597	43.8%
Hispanic or Latino (of any race)	75,956	88.5%

=== 2010 census ===
As of the 2010 United States census, 77,058 people, resided in the city.

=== 2000 census ===
As of the 2000 United States census, 45,408 people, 13,766 households, and 11,384 families lived in the city. The population density was 1,881.9 inhabitants per square mile (726.6/km^{2}). The 17,723 housing units had an average density of 734.5/sq mi (283.6/km^{2}). The racial makeup of the city was 77.63% White, 0.37% African American, 0.38% Native American, 1.63% Asian, 18.65% from other races, and 2.34% from two or more races. Hispanics or Latinos of any race were 81.03% of the population.

Of the 13,766 households, 43.4% had children under 18 living with them, 64.8% were married couples living together, 14.5% had a female householder with no husband present, and 17.3% were not families; 15.3% of all households were made up of individuals, and 9.1% had someone living alone who was 65 or older. The average household size was 3.29, and the average family size was 3.68.

In the city, the age distribution was 32.1% under 18, 9.8% from 18 to 24, 26.8% from 25 to 44, 17.1% from 45 to 64, and 14.2% who were 65 or older. The median age was 30 years. For every 100 females, there were 91.1 males. For every 100 females 18 and over, there were 85.3 males.

The median income for a household in the city was $30,647, and for a family was $33,465. Males had a median income of $25,710 versus $20,718 for females. The per capita income for the city was $12,796. About 22.6% of families and 26.8% of the population were below the poverty line, including 37.4% of those under 18 and 15.6% of those 65 or over.

The United States Postal Service operates a post office in the city. Local ZIP codes include 78571, 78572, 78573, and 78574.

== Economy ==
Mission shares the same economic growth that nearby McAllen is experiencing. The Mission Economic Development Corporation promotes development in the area.

The city has been advertised as the "Home of the Ruby Red" grapefruit since 1921, due to the fruit being commonly grown in the area. The city is also home to the Texas Citrus Exchange. The city holds the annual Texas Citrus Fiesta Parade along Conway Avenue, which features fruit-decorated floats, bands, law enforcement agencies, fire departments, and many local and city government officials.

Moore Air Force Base (deactivated) is located 15 miles (24 km) north of the city. It is the location of the First Lift Station of the Mission Canal Company that once irrigated 15,000 acres (61 km^{2}) of farmland in the Rio Grande Valley.

== Education ==
=== Primary and secondary schools ===
Most of Mission is a part of the Mission Consolidated Independent School District. Other portions extend into the La Joya Independent School District and the Sharyland Independent School District.

Mission CISD operates Mission High School and Veterans Memorial High School. Sharyland ISD Mission is divided between Sharyland High School and Sharyland Pioneer High School. LJISD Mission is zoned to Palmview High School.

In addition, South Texas Independent School District operates magnet schools that serve the community.

Mission is also the site of San Juan Diego Academy, a Catholic high school operated by the Roman Catholic Diocese of Brownsville.

=== Public libraries ===
The Speer Memorial Library serves Mission. The facility has 48,760 square feet (4,530 m^{2}) of space.

The library originated in March 1914, when the Civic League of Mission was formed to maintain a park and form a library. The first library board included officers from the civic league. In 1929, the city of Mission passed an ordinance making the library a part of the city government. In 1930, the library was in a room in the First National Bank. Later, it moved to the Mission City Hall. From the early 1930s until 1947, the city library shared facilities with the school library. By 1960, it outgrew the building it had occupied. In 1976, Juanita Speer Farley donated the deed to her property to the city. A new library, designed by Warren Suter, an architect from Mission, was constructed in 1976 and 1977. The official completion date of the 14,000 square feet (1,300 m^{2}) library was June 1, 1977. An addition in 1988 increased the library's area to 18,660 square feet (1,734 m^{2}). An additional expansion of 30,100 square feet (2,800 m^{2}), designed by architect TAG International, LLP, and constructed by Velasco Construction, was scheduled to be completed in March 2005, and the renovation of the older portions of the library was scheduled to begin afterwards.

== Media ==
=== Radio ===
- KCAS 91.5 FM
- KFRQ 94.5 FM
- KKPS 99.5 FM
- KNVO 101.1 FM
- KVLY 107.9 FM
- KVMV 96.9 FM
- KTEX 100.3 FM
- KFCC 97.9 FM

== Notable people ==
- Fortunato Benavides, judge on the U.S. Court of Appeals for the Fifth Circuit, born in Mission
- Lloyd Bentsen, former U.S. senator and vice-presidential nominee, born in Mission in 1921
- William Jennings Bryan, presidential candidate and former Secretary of State, lived for a time in Mission
- William S. Burroughs, writer of Naked Lunch, lived in Mission for a short while and wrote about it in Junkie
- Jorge Cantu, MLB player from Sharyland High School, who played for Tampa Bay Rays, Cincinnati Reds, Florida Marlins, Texas Rangers, San Diego Padres, and now playing for Colorado Rockies
- Koy Detmer, brother of Heisman Trophy winner Ty Detmer, played for and carried the Mission Eagles football team to the semi-finals in Texas 5A football under the leadership of his father, Sonny Detmer
- Jaime Garcia, professional MLB player from Sharyland High School playing with 2011 World Series champions St. Louis Cardinals
- Kika de la Garza, former state representative and former U.S. representative, chairman of the Agriculture Committee
- Lena Guerrero, the first woman and first ethnic minority person to serve on the regulatory Texas Railroad Commission
- Pierre Yves Kéralum (1817–1872), priest and architect
- Joe M. Kilgore, former U.S. representative, reared partly in Mission
- Tom Landry, Hall of Fame coach of the Dallas Cowboys, born and raised, played for Mission High School
- Ana Liz Pulido, James Beard Award winner for Best Chef:Texas in 2024
- Tito Santana (or Merced Solis), former World Wrestling Federation (now WWE) star
- Trinidad Silva, actor
- Jamaar Taylor, attended Mission High School and played football, later being drafted by the New York Giants. After his retirement, he helped coach at Mission Veterans Memorial High School for a brief period.

== Sister cities ==
- Puerto Vallarta, Jalisco, México}
- Autlán de Navarro, Jalisco, México
- Axochiapan, Morelos, México
- Ciudad Ayala, Morelos, México
- Casimiro Castillo, Jalisco, México
- Villa del Carbón, State of México, México
- Monclova, Coahuila, México
- Linares, Nuevo León, México
- Puente de Ixtla, Morelos, México:
- Ocuituco, Morelos, México:
- Valle Hermoso, Tamaulipas, México
- Salinas Victoria, Nuevo León, México
- Allende, Nuevo León, México
- Cadereyta Jiménez, Nuevo León, México
- General Terán, Nuevo León, México
- Almolonga, Guatemala

== See also ==
- Hayes-Sammons Chemical Plant
- La Lomita Chapel
- National Butterfly Center
- Shary Heights Historic District
