= Timeline of Waco, Texas =

The following is a timeline of the history of the city of Waco, Texas, US.

== 19th century ==
- 1830 – Hueco village sacked by Cherokees.
- 1849
  - Shapley Prince Ross, a Texas Ranger who built the first house at Waco Village and established a ferry across the Brazos River, founds Waco, Texas.
  - March 1 – First sale of town lots at Waco Village.
- 1850
  - Shapley P. Ross opens the town’s first hotel.
  - Shapley P. Ross becomes Waco’s first postmaster.
  - Ross’s ferry across the Brazos River begins operating.
  - Waco becomes seat of newly established McLennan County, Texas.
- 1851 – Population: 152.
- 1852 – First Street Cemetery established (approximate date).
- 1854 – Waco Era newspaper begins publication.
- 1856 – Town of Waco incorporated.
- 1858 – Southern Democrat newspaper begins publication.
- 1861 – Waco University founded.
- 1865 – Waco Examiner newspaper begins publication.
- 1866 – New Hope Baptist Church established.
- 1870
  - Waco Suspension Bridge opens.
  - Waco Tap Railroad begins operating.
  - Population: 3,008.
- 1871 – First Presbyterian Church built.
- 1872 – Waco and Northwestern Railroad begins operating.
- 1873
  - Fletcher Cemetery established.
  - Sanger Brothers shop in business.
- 1877 – Paul Quinn College relocated to Waco from Austin.
- 1878 – Oakwood Cemetery established.
- 1879 – St. Paul's Episcopal Church rebuilt.
- 1880 – Population: 7,295.
- 1881 – Rodeph Sholom Synagogue dedicated.
- 1884
  - Garland Opera House in business.
  - McClelland Opera House in business (approximate date).
- 1885
  - Slayden-Kirksey Woolen Mill in business.
  - Baylor University relocated to Waco from Independence.
  - Flavored beverage "Dr. Pepper first mixed at Old Corner Drug in Waco."
- 1889 – "Hot artesian water...discovered beneath the city."
- 1890
  - C.C. McCulloch elected mayor.
  - Population: 14,445.
- 1892 – Geyser Ice Company in business.
- 1894 – Cotton Palace Exposition begins.
- 1895
  - AddRan College relocated to Waco from Thorp Spring.
  - Floral Society formed.
- 1897 – Waco Times-Herald newspaper in publication.
- 1898 – April 1: "Brann-Davis shooting."
- 1899 – Public library established.
- 1900 – Population: 20,686.

== 20th century ==
- 1901 – McLennan County Courthouse built.
- 1906 – Dr. Pepper bottling plant built.
- 1910 – Brazos Valley Cotton Oil mill in business.
- 1911
  - Amicable Life Insurance Co. building constructed.
  - Farmers' Improvement Bank founded.
  - Rex Theatre in business.
- 1912 – Raleigh Hotel built.
- 1914
  - Hippodrome Theatre opens.
  - Kestner's store in business.
- 1916 – May 15: Lynching of Jesse Washington.
- 1919 – Elite Cafe in business.
- 1920 – Population: 38,500.
- 1922 – WACO radio begins broadcasting.
- 1923 – July 30: Execution of Roy Mitchell.
- 1929 – Alamo Plaza Motor Hotel chain in business.
- 1930 – Population: 52,848.
- 1931 – St. Francis Catholic Church built.
- 1936 – September: Flood.
- 1937 – Blue Triangle Young Women's Christian Association formed.
- 1945 – U.S. Veterans Administration Medical Center built.
- 1950 – Population: 84,706.
- 1953 – May: 1953 Waco tornado outbreak.
- 1955
  - KWTX-TV (television) begins broadcasting.
  - Cameron Park Zoo established.
- 1964 – Urban renewal project begins.
- 1965 – Flood control dam built on Brazos River basin.
- 1967 – Historic Waco Foundation established.
- 1974 – Oscar De Conge becomes mayor.
- 1980 – Population: 101,261.
- 1982 – July: 1982 Lake Waco murders.
- 1983 – :Richard Grandy co-founded Easy Gardener Products, Inc.
- 1993 – February 28 – April 19: Siege of religious Mount Carmel Center near Waco.

== 21st century ==
- 2010 – Population: city 124,805; megaregion 19,728,244.
- 2012 – Malcolm P. Duncan Jr. becomes mayor.
- 2015 – May 17: 2015 Waco shootout.
- 2016 – Kyle Deaver becomes mayor.
- 2023 – Former president Donald Trump holds the first rally of his successful 2024 presidential campaign.

== See also ==
- Waco, Texas history
- List of mayors of Waco, Texas
- National Register of Historic Places listings in McLennan County, Texas
- Timelines of other cities in Texas: Arlington, Austin, Brownsville, Corpus Christi, Dallas, El Paso, Fort Worth, Houston, Laredo, Lubbock, San Antonio

== Bibliography ==
=== published in 19th c. ===
- Sleeper and Hutchins, ed. (1876). Waco and McLennan County.
- "Waco". Texas State Gazetteer and Business Directory. St. Louis: R.L. Polk & Co. 1884 – via Internet Archive.
- "Waco". Texas State Gazetteer and Business Directory. Detroit: R.L. Polk & Co. 1890 – via Internet Archive.

=== published in 20th c. ===
- Directory of the City of Waco. Galveston: Morrison & Fourmy. 1902 – via University of North Texas Libraries.
- "Waco" . Encyclopædia Britannica. Vol. 28 (11th ed.). 1910. p. 225.
- James H. Mackey, ed. (1914). Municipal Hand Book of the City of Waco.
- Ellis A. Davis; Edwin H. Grobe, eds. (1926). "(Waco)". New Encyclopedia of Texas. Dallas: Texas Development Bureau. pp. 76–79 – via Internet Archive. circa 1926? (fulltext)
- Federal Writers' Project (1940), "Waco", Texas: A Guide to the Lone Star State, American Guide Series, New York: Hastings House, hdl:2027/mdp.39015002677667 – via HathiTrust + chronology
- Roger N. Conger. Highlights of Waco History. Waco: Hill Printing and Stationery Co, 1945.
- Dayton Kelley (1972). Handbook of Waco and McLennan County, Texas. Texian Press.
- William R. Poage (1981). McLennan County, Before 1980. Texian Press.
- Patricia Ward Wallace (1983). Waco: Texas Crossroads.
- Historical Markers of McLennan County. Waco: McLennan College. 1986. OCLC 14699197 – via Waco History Project. (fulltext)
- Agnes Warren Barnes (1999). Waco, Texas: A Postcard Journey. Arcadia. ISBN 978-0738502977.
- Patricia Ward Wallace (1999). Waco: A Sesquicentennial History.
- Garry H. Radford, Sr. (2000). African American Heritage in Waco, Texas. Austin: Eakin Press.

=== published in 21st c. ===
- Selected Publications with Some Mention of Waco and the Waco Area (PDF), Waco History Project, 2009 (bibliography)
- T. Bradford Willis (2009), Some Notable Persons in First Street Cemetery of Waco, Texas (PDF) – via University of North Texas Libraries (fulltext)
- Sharon Bracken (2010). "Waco". Historic McLennan County: An Illustrated History. San Antonio: Lammert. pp. 7–15. ISBN 978-1935377221.
- Betty Dooley Awbrey; Stuart Awbrey (2013). "Waco". Why Stop?: A Guide to Texas Roadside Historical Markers (6th ed.). Taylor Trade Publishing. p. 480+. ISBN 978-1589797901.
- David G. McComb (2015). "Railroad Towns: Waco". The City in Texas: a History. University of Texas Press. pp. 130+. ISBN 978-0292767461.
- Eric Ames (2016) [2009]. Waco. Images of Modern America. Arcadia. ISBN 978-1467115520.
