= History of Corpus Christi, Texas =

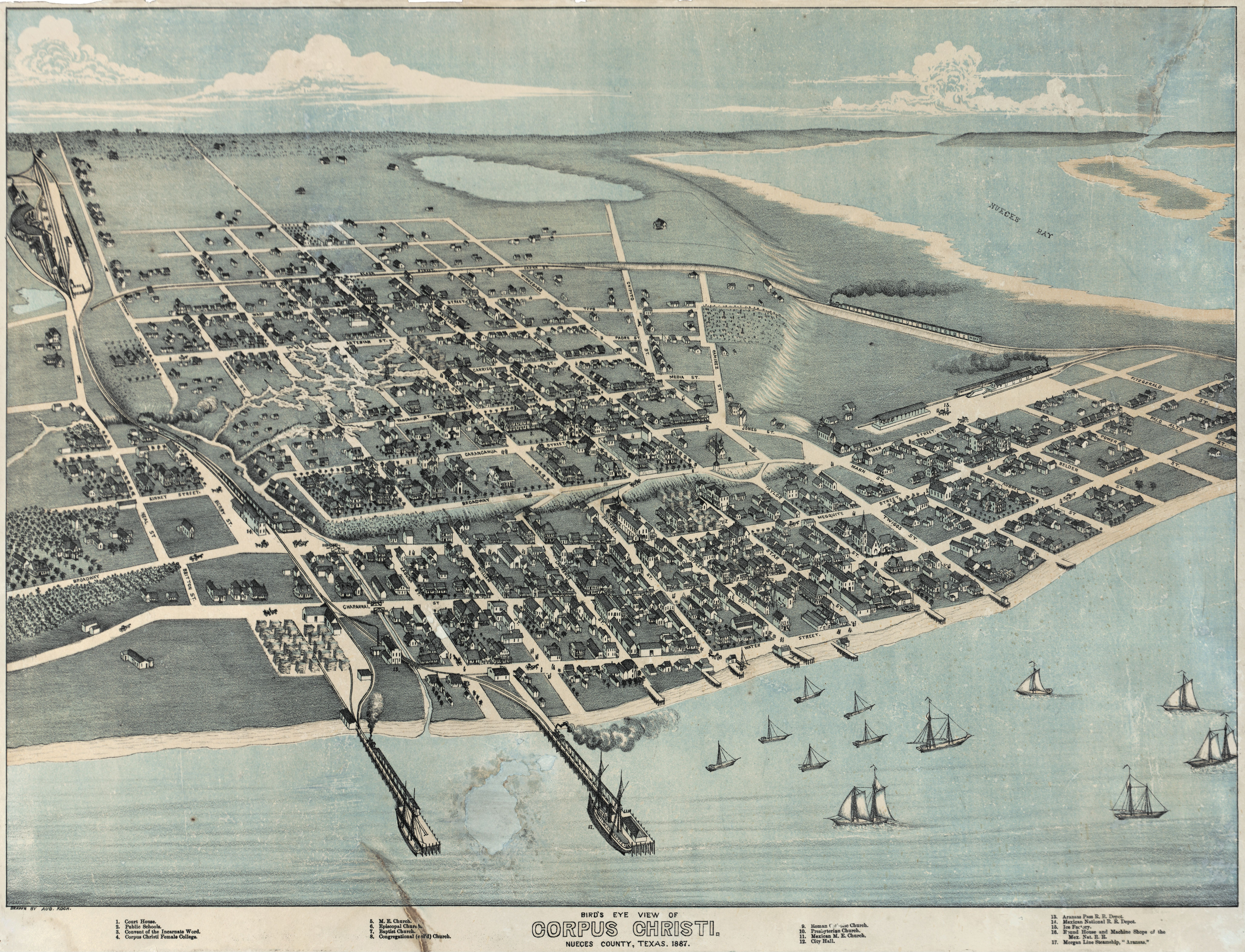
Map of Corpus Christi in 1887

Historical population
Census	Pop.	Note	%±
1860	175		—
1870	2,140		1,122.9%
1880	3,257		52.2%
1890	4,387		34.7%
1900	4,703		7.2%
1910	8,222		74.8%
1920	10,522		28.0%
1930	27,741		163.6%
1940	57,301		106.6%
1950	108,287		89.0%
1960	167,690		54.9%
1970	204,525		22.0%
1980	231,999		13.4%
1990	257,453		11.0%
2000	277,454		7.8%
2010	307,953		11.0%
2020	317,852		3.2%
2022 (est.)	316,239		−0.5%

Corpus Christi is a coastal city in the South Texas region of the U.S. state of Texas. The county seat of Nueces County, it also extends into Aransas, Kleberg, and San Patricio counties. The population was 277,454 at the 2000 census; in 2006 the U.S. Census Bureau estimated the city's population at 285,175, making it the eighth-largest city in the state. It is the principal city of the three-county Corpus Christi Metropolitan Statistical Area as well as the larger Corpus Christi-Kingsville Combined Statistical Area. The translation from Latin of the city's name is Body of Christ, given to the settlement by the Spanish, in honor of the Blessed Sacrament (Eucharist). The city has been nicknamed The Sparkling City by the Sea, or "Corpitos" particularly in literature promoting tourism.

Before Corpus Christi was known as Kinney's Rancho or Kinney's Ranch it was on a site known as the Old Indian Trading Grounds where traders smuggled contraband goods to sell and trade in Mexico as early as 1829.

== Texas Revolution and Mexican–American War ==
Corpus Christi was founded in 1839 by Colonel Henry Lawrence Kinney as Kinney's Trading Post, or Kinney's Ranch, a small trading post to sell supplies to a Mexican revolutionary army camped about 25 miles west, just three years after Texas declared independence from Mexico. The post was located in the disputed territory south of the Nueces River. In July 1845, U.S. troops under General Zachary Taylor set up camp there in preparation for war with Mexico, where they remained until March 1846, when they marched south to the Rio Grande to enforce it as the southern border of the United States.Corpus Christi was a “no man's land” at the time before war. The city played a role as a staging ground and a disputed borderland during the transition from the Texas Revolution to the U.S. Mexican War. Corpus Christi was right in the middle of the fight over where the border between Texas and Mexico should be. After the war, it stayed mostly empty until 1839, when a trading post was built. Because of its location on the border, it became a spot to trade, smuggle, and it eventually served as a base for the U.S military during the Mexican American War.

== Civil War ==
On February 23, 1861, in a statewide vote on secession, the vote in Corpus Christi was 87 for secession and 40 against, which brought the total vote in Nueces County to 164 for and 42 against. There were many Union sympathizers in the city. Some originally came from the North and some were veterans of the Mexican War.

In the second week of August 1862, five Union warships under the command of Lt. J.W. Kittredge sailed into Corpus Christi Bay and bombarded the city. Stores and houses below the bluff made easy targets for Kittredge's guns. The bombardment did considerable damage to the town. Many of the residents had evacuated before the battle. After it was over, people began to return to town. The Confederates, provoked by the attack, then began to take revenge by plundering the homes and property of known Union supporters.The discovery of oil and the completion of the port in 1926. A naval air station bonded its longtime military character. Many veterans chose to stick around after their service. through groups such as the G.I. Forum, the League of United Latin American Citizens and the Westside Business Association, were descended from rural families settled in the region.

== Port of Corpus Christi ==
Before there was a port in Corpus Christi, smugglers found their way to the shallow shores right before the Texas Revolution in 1836. Henry L. kinney stopped this by opening a trading post in 1838. Once the Mexican- American war ended from 1846-1848, the post became more useful when the California Gold Rush happened in 1849. From then on Corpus Christi became a main stop for travelers in San Antonio and the Rio Grande Valley. In 1854, the city expanded the port so that it would be suitable for larger boats. In 1857, a long path was opened from Corpus Christi to Aransas Pass. Although there was a roadblock from the federal ships during the civil war from 1861 to 1865, Corpus Christi was still a major port for Confederate trade in Mexico until the harbor was captured in 1874. After all that the waterway was then expanded again in 1874. (When Elihu Harrison Ropes moved to Corpus Christi in 1890, he invested in plans to develop the area and improve access to the port. He used a steam dredge to dig a 14-mile-long, 15-foot-deep passage all along Mustang Island. Panic struck when Ropes went bankrupt and lost all his plans in 1893. Corpus Christi then fell in a little depression, with a decreasing population and bank deposits. This continued until January 1905, Corpus Christi leaders made an agreement with Rockport. Corpus Christi said they would offer 18 acres of land if they gave up the Epworth League, which was said to bring thousands of people over the summer due to a national and international convention called the Epworth League convention. This was a large gathering for both the youth and young adults. Once Rockport agreed to take up some of Corpus Christi’s land now known as North Beach. The town started it’s own awakening, with thousands and thousands of people coming from the San Antonio and Aransas pass railroads. After all of Corpus Christi’s efforts to reviving the city. The city got struck with a catastrophic disaster in 1919 due to a hurricane. The damage was so sever that all of downtown was destroyed along with North Beach. The only thing Corpus could think of was opening a port to revive the city once again. They eventually officially opened the port up on September 15^{th} , 1926. Corpus Christi is now the biggest port, in the United States, ranking as the 3^{rd} largest port in the U.S. and still continues to expand till this day.

== Natural disasters ==
=== Hurricanes ===
Corpus Christi has been affected by many hurricanes and tropical storms.

- 1916 Texas hurricane
- 1919 Florida Keys hurricane
- Hurricane Carla (1961)
- Hurricane Beulah (1967)
- Hurricane Celia (1970)
- Tropical Storm Amelia (1978)
- Hurricane Allen (1980)
- Hurricane Bret (1999)
- Hurricane Harvey (2017)
- Hurricane Hanna (2020)
- A 1919 hurricane swept many buildings off its low-lying bayfront. Corpus built a seawall, lower than the one in Galveston. The hurricane made landfall in the southern Coastal Bend as a Category 3 hurricane with sustained winds of 115 mph and a central pressure of 950 millibars. The hurricane produced a storm surge that affected the entire Texas coast into Louisiana. The highest storm surge was at Corpus Christi at 16 feet. Corpus Christi as water reached 11.5 feet, and debris was piled as high as 16 feet.

== See also ==
- Timelines of other cities in the South Texas area of Texas: Brownsville, Laredo, McAllen, San Antonio
- Hillcrest, Corpus Christi
