= Timeline of San Antonio =

Coordinates: 29.417°N 98.500°W

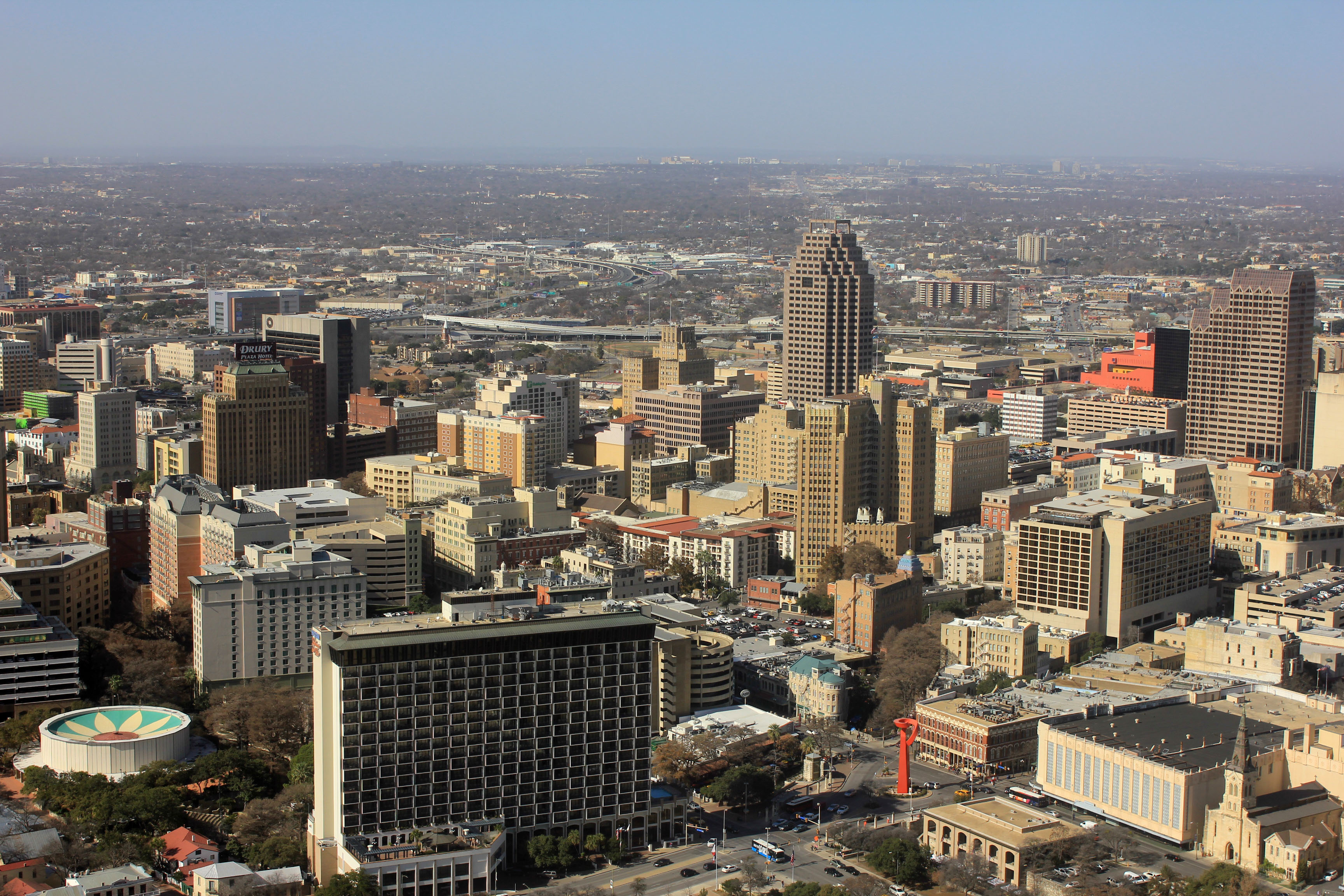
Cityscape

The following is a timeline of the history of the city of San Antonio, Texas, United States.

== 18th century ==
- 1718
  - San Antonio founded by Martín de Alarcón.
  - Mission San Antonio de Valero founded.
- 1720 – Mission San Jose founded.
- 1722 – Presidio San Antonio de Bexar built.
- 1731 – Juan Leal Goraz becomes first mayor.
- 1750 – Church of San Fernando completed.
- 1773 – San Antonio de Bexar named capital of Spanish Texas.
- 1782 – Mission San Jose building constructed.
- 1793 – San Antonio de Valero secularized into military post.

== 19th century ==
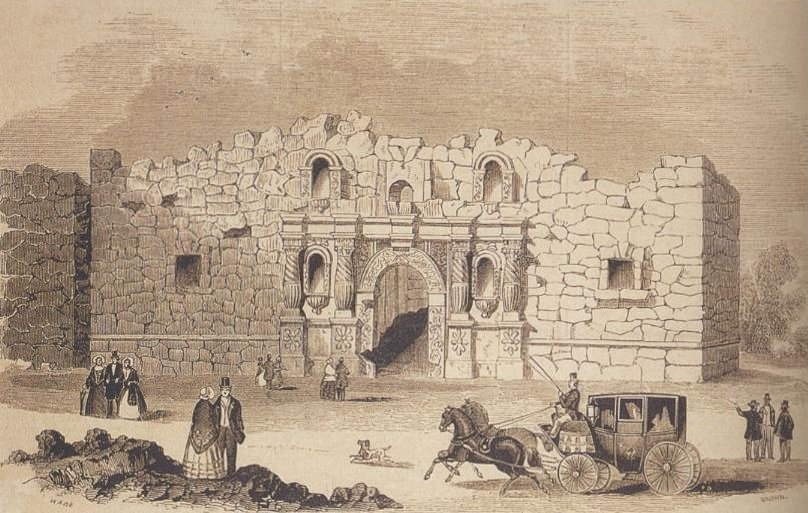
The Alamo in 1854

- 1811 – Juan Baptista de Las Casas, a retired captain from Nuevo Santander, along with several revolutionaries buoyed by the successes of Hidalgo's army in Guanajuato, march into town and arrest the Governors Herrera and Salcedo. Spain stops sending money for troops.
- 1813 – Battle of Medina occurs near town.
- 1821 – San Antonio becomes part of the Mexican Empire.
- 1835 - Oct 12 - Dec 11: Siege of Béxar
- 1836 – February 23 – March 6: Battle of the Alamo.
- 1837 – John William Smith becomes mayor.
- 1840 – March 19: Council House Fight.
- 1842 – September 17: Battle of Salado Creek occurs near town.
- 1845 – San Antonio becomes part of the new U.S. state of Texas.
- 1849 – Cholera epidemic.
- 1852 – St. Mary's Institute founded.
- 1853 – Public schools established.
- 1855 – William Menger and Charles Degen establish the city's first brewing operation, Western Brewing.
- 1858 – St. Mark's Episcopal Church founded.
- 1860 – U.S. Census lists 8,235 inhabitants in the town, including 592 enslaved.
- 1865
  - U.S. Army Fort Sam Houston established.
  - Juneteenth is an American holiday that commemorates the June 19, 1865 announcement of the abolition of slavery in the U.S. state of Texas.
  - San Antonio Express newspaper begins publication.
- 1868 – Frost Bank established.
- 1869 – Trinity University founded.
- 1860s – Rincon School founded, the first public African American school in the city
- 1871 – Mount Zion Baptist Church founded.
- 1872 – Alamo Literary Society formed.
- 1874 – Catholic Diocese of San Antonio and Temple Beth-El congregation founded.
- 1875 – Sociedad Benevolencia Mexicana founded.
- 1878 – Railroad begins operating.
- 1880 – Population: 20,550.
- 1881
  - Evening Light newspaper begins publication.
  - Incarnate Word College founded.
- 1883 – San Antonio Brewing Company in business.
- 1884
  - March 11: Vaudeville Theater Ambush.
  - Societa Italiana di Mutuo Soccorso founded.
- 1885
  - Scholz's Palm Garden in business.
  - Alamo City Commercial College established.
- 1890 – Population: 37,673.
- 1891
  - Battle of Flowers festival begins.
  - The San Antonio Fire Department established.
- 1894 – Peacock Military College established.
- 1895 – Our Lady of the Lake College opened.
- 1896

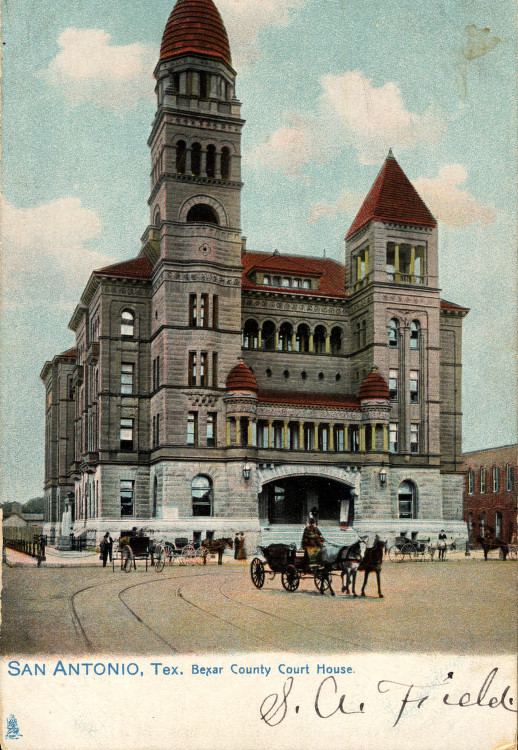
The Bexar County Courthouse around the turn of the 20th Century

  - Buckhorn Saloon and Gebhardt's Chili Powder Company in business.
  - Bexar County Courthouse built.
- 1897 – Ella Austin Orphanage established.
- 1898
  - Woman's Club of San Antonio founded.
  - St. Philip's College founded.
- 1899 – Brackenridge Park created.
- 1900
  - Incarnate Word Academy for girls established.
  - Population: 53,321.

== 20th century ==
=== 1900s–1940s ===
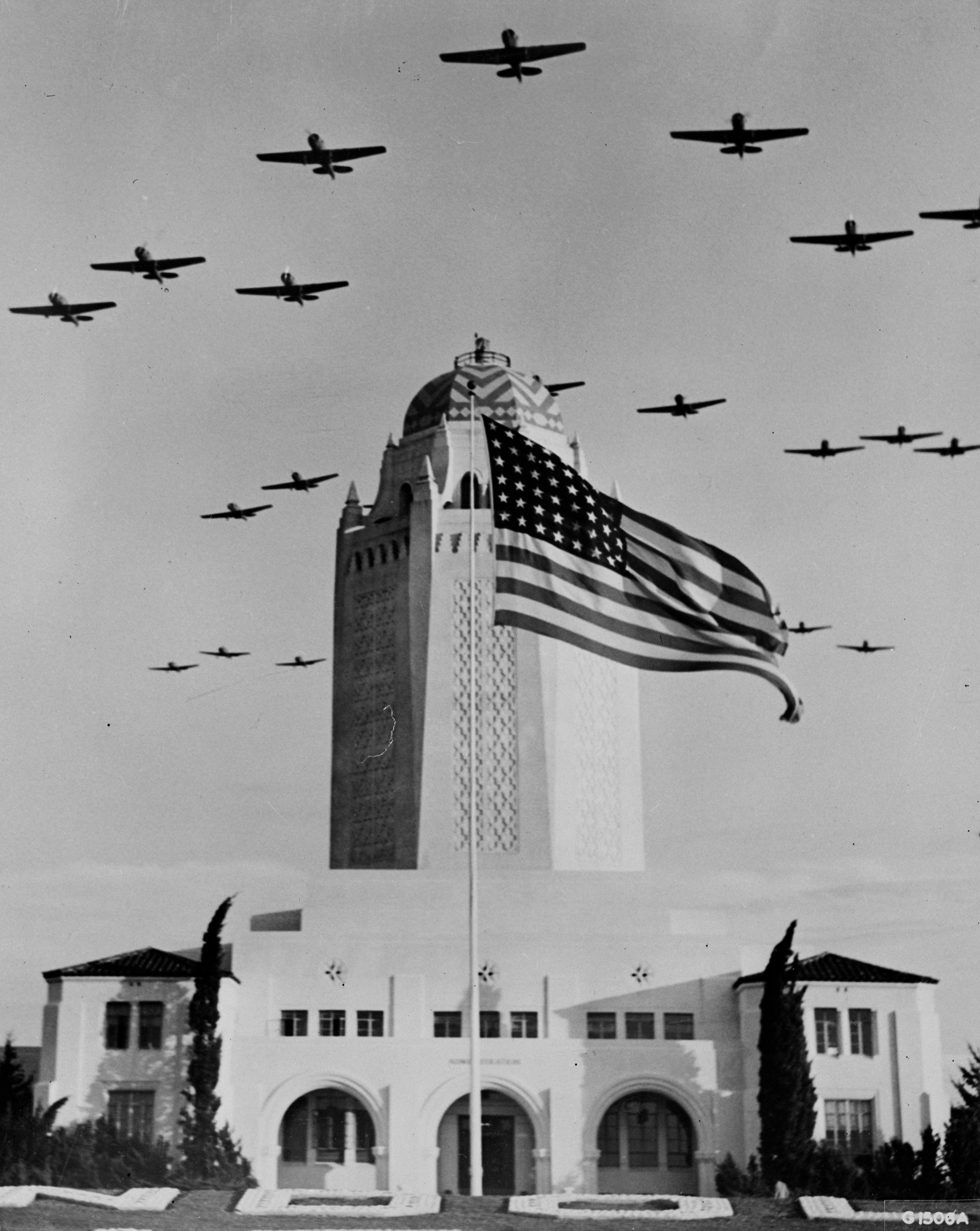
The Randolph Air Force Base Administration Building

- 1903 – San Antonio Public Library established.
- 1910
  - Population: 96,614.
  - Thomas Weir Labatt founded what became Labatt Food Service.
- 1912 – Alamo Methodist Church built.
- 1914
  - San Antonio Zoo founded.
  - River Park (predecessor to the River Walk) is completed.
  - Empire Theater opens.
- 1917 – U.S. Army Kelly Air Force Base established.
- 1918
  - U.S. Army Brooks Air Force Base established.
  - San Antonio Evening News begins publication.
- 1920 – Population: 161,379.
- 1921 – September 1921 San Antonio floods.
- 1922
  - WOAI radio begins broadcasting.
  - USAA starts operations.
- 1924 – San Antonio Conservation Society formed.
- 1925 – San Antonio Junior College founded.
- 1926
  - Aztec Theater opens.
  - Witte Museum and Texas Cavaliers established.
- 1927 – KONO radio begins broadcasting.
- 1928 – Air conditioning installed in hi-rise Milam Building.
- 1929 – Majestic Theatre and Cool Crest Miniature Golf opens.
- 1930 – Population: 231,542.
- 1931 – U.S. Army Randolph Air Force Base begins operating.
- 1932 – Frito Company in business.
- 1933 – Earl Abel's restaurant in business
- 1933 – Rincon School (then known as the Frederick Douglass School) closes as a high school
- 1937
  - San Antonio Housing Authority established.
  - Station Hospital rebuilt.
- 1938
  - Pecan-sheller labor strike.
  - Ciculo Social Femenino Mexicano founded.
  - Brooke Army Medical Center opened.
- 1939 - WPA construction begins on Robert H.H. Hugman's vision to transform River Park to Spanish-Style shops of Aragon and Romula.
- 1940
  - Alamo Stadium built.
  - Hertzberg Circus Museum established.
  - Population: 253,854.
- 1941
  - U.S. military Lackland Air Force Base, Broadway National Bank, and San Jose Mission National Historic Site established.
  - Mi Tierra restaurant in business.
  - The San Antonio River Walk is completed.
- 1942 – Trinity University relocates to San Antonio.
- 1946
  - Brooke Army Medical Center active.
  - Casa Rio restaurant in business.
- 1947
  - Jim's eatery and Josephine Theatre in business.
  - Southwest Research Institute headquartered in city.
- 1948 – Sultanas de Bejar (women's group) formed.
- 1949 – WOAI-TV (television) begins broadcasting.

=== 1950s–1990s ===
- 1950
  - Free port and Stock Show and Rodeo established.
  - KENS-TV (television) begins broadcasting.
  - Population: 408,442.
  - McNay Art Museum established.
- 1958 – Fiesta Noche del Rio begins.
- 1959 – South Texas Medical School chartered.
- 1960 – Population: 587,718.
- 1961 – Henry B. Gonzalez becomes U.S. representative for Texas's 20th congressional district.
- 1965 – Southwest School of the Art founded.

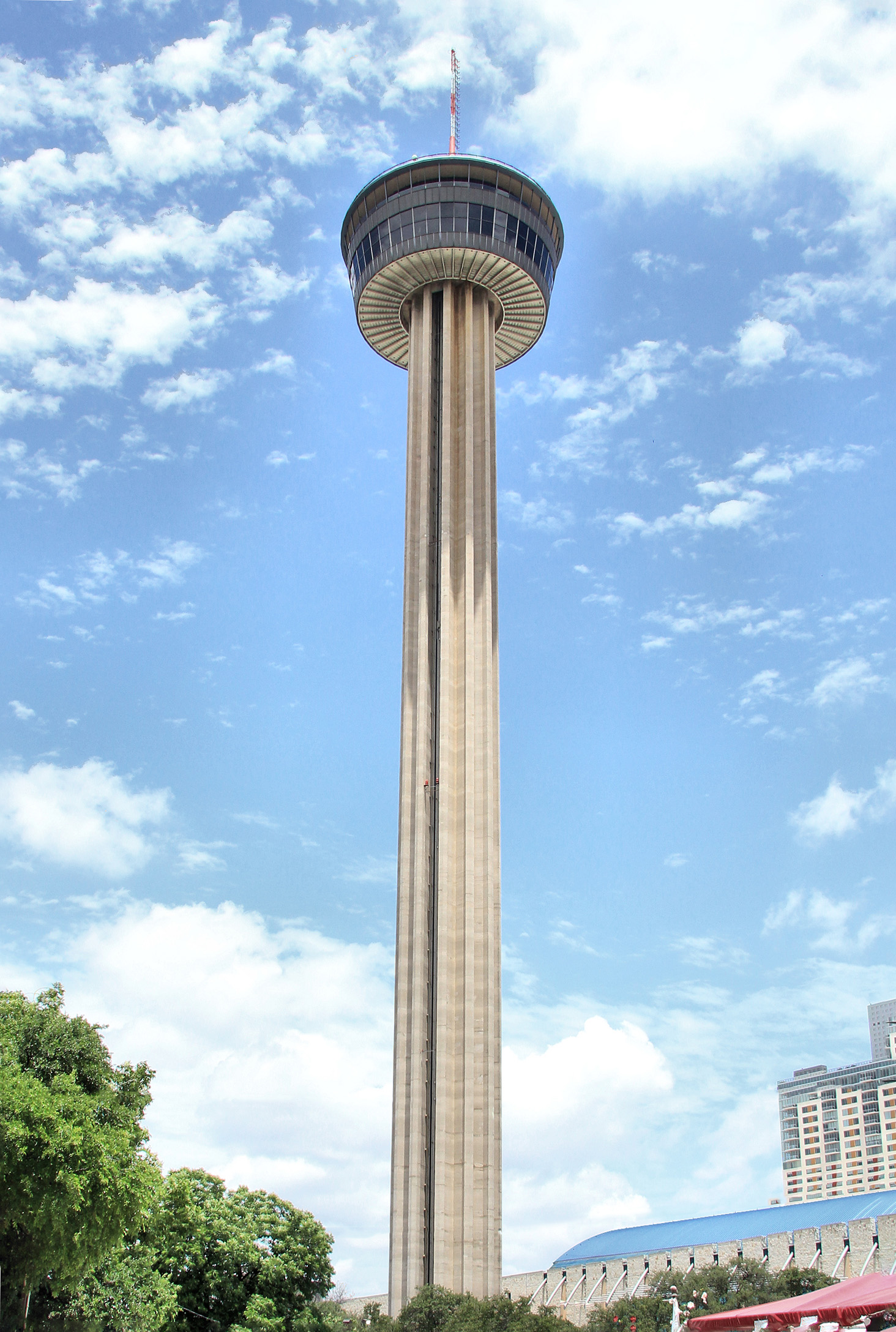
The Tower of the Americas, the theme structure for Hemisfair '68

- 1968
  - Tower of the Americas erected.
  - HemisFair Arena opens.
  - HemisFair '68 held.
  - Institute of Texan Cultures established.
  - Hilton Palacio del Rio hotel in business.
- 1969 – Paseo Del Rio Association formed.
- 1970 – Population: 654,153.
- 1972
  - Texas Folklife Festival begins.
  - Clear Channel Communications opens.
- 1973 – San Antonio Spurs basketball team active.
- 1975 – Lila Cockrell elected Mayor, San Antonio's first woman mayor.
- 1978 – City passes ordinance creating VIA Metropolitan Transit Authority, the public transport system for San Antonio.
- 1980
  - San Antonio Botanical Garden opens.
  - Annual Tejano Music Awards begin.
  - Area of city: 263.5 square miles.
  - San Antonio Food Bank active (approximate date).
  - Population: 785,880.
  - In 1980, Texas was the first state to establish Juneteenth as a state holiday under legislation introduced by freshman Democratic state representative Al Edwards.
  - Valero Energy established.
- 1981
  - San Antonio Museum of Art established out of the former Lone Star Brewery complex.
  - Hyatt Regency San Antonio hotel in business.
  - Henry Cisneros becomes mayor.
- 1987 – Lamar S. Smith becomes U.S. representative for Texas's 21st congressional district.
- 1988 – SeaWorld in business.
- 1990 – Population: 935,933.
- 1991 – Nelson W. Wolff becomes mayor.
- 1992 – Fiesta Texas in business.
- 1995
  - City website online (approximate date).
  - Artpace founded.
  - New San Antonio Public Library's central library opens.
- 1997 – 55th World Science Fiction Convention held.
- 2000
  - Bahá'í Center of San Antonio founded.
  - Population: 1,144,646.

== 21st century ==
- 2001 – Gurudwara Sikh Center of San Antonio founded.
- 2001 – San Antonio bids to host the 2007 Pan American Games, but loses to Rio de Janeiro.
- 2003 – Toyota Motor Manufacturing Texas established.
- 2005
  - Municipal Archives established.
  - Joint Base San Antonio organized, consisting of Fort Sam Houston, Lackland, and Randolph.
- 2007 – Port Authority of San Antonio founded.
- 2008 – Spurs Community Garden created.
- 2009
  - San Antonio mayoral election, 2009 held; Julian Castro (2014 head of HUD) becomes mayor.
  - NOWCastSA community news begins publication.
  - Texas A&M University–San Antonio established.
- 2010
  - Population: city 1,327,407; metro 2,142,508; megaregion 19,728,244.
  - Area of city: 460.93 square miles.
- 2011 – Population: 1,359,758; metro 2,194,927.
- 2013
  - BiblioTech public library opens.
  - Population: 1,409,019.
  - Joaquin Castro becomes U.S. representative for Texas's 20th congressional district.
  - Briscoe Western Art Museum opened.
- 2014
  - Ivy Taylor becomes first African-American female mayor of San Antonio.
  - Tobin Center for the Performing Arts opens.
- 2015 – May: San Antonio mayoral election, 2015, held.
- 2018
  - April: Baboons escape from Texas Biomedical Research Institute.
  - San Antonio celebrates the Tricentennial anniversary of its founding.
- 2022 – June: At least 46 people are found dead inside a tractor-trailer in San Antonio.

== See also ==
- History of San Antonio
- History of African Americans in San Antonio
- List of mayors of San Antonio
- National Register of Historic Places listings in Bexar County, Texas
- Timelines of other cities in the South Texas area of Texas: Brownsville, Corpus Christi, Laredo, McAllen

== Bibliography ==
=== Published in the 19th century ===
- Adolph Wilhelm August Friedrich von Steinwehr (1874), "San Antonio", Centennial Gazetteer of the United States, Philadelphia: J.C. McCurdy & Company
- "San Antonio" . Encyclopædia Britannica. Vol. 21 (9th ed.). 1886.
- "San Antonio". Texas State Gazetteer and Business Directory. Detroit: R.L. Polk & Co. 1890 – via Internet Archive.
- Street, avenue and alley guide to San Antonio, Texas, 1892, OL 24366181M

=== Published in the 20th century ===
- George Pierce Garrison (1903), "Beginnings of San Antonio", Texas: a contest of civilizations, Boston: Houghton, Mifflin and Company
- Henry Ryder-Taylor (1908), Visitor's guide and history of San Antonio, Texas, San Antonio, Tex: N. Tengg, OCLC 10471850, OL 23356936M
- Chamber of Commerce (1910), San Antonio, the convention city, San Antonio: Guessaz & Perlet, OL 23368850M
- "San Antonio" . Encyclopædia Britannica. Vol. 24 (11th ed.). 1910. pp. 126–127.
- Edward Hungerford (1913), "City of the Little Squares", The Personality of American Cities, New York: McBride, Nast & Company
- Marin B. Fenwick, ed. (1917). Who's who among the women of San Antonio and Southwest Texas?. San Antonio, Tex.: Marin B. Fenwick.
- Craighead (1919), Street Guide of San Antonio, Texas, OL 23383569M
- Federal Writers' Project (1938), "Condensed Chronology", San Antonio, American Guide Series, San Antonio, TX: Clegg Company, hdl:2027/mdp.39015034642333
- Charles W. Ramsdell, San Antonio: A Historical and Pictorial Guide (Austin: University of Texas Press, 1959).
- Leah Carter Johnston (1975), San Antonio (Revised ed.), Naylor Co., ISBN 9780811105859, OCLC 2137230
- T. R. Fehrenbach, The San Antonio Story (Tulsa, Oklahoma: Continental Heritage Press, 1978)
- Ory Mazar Nergal, ed. (1980), "San Antonio, TX", Encyclopedia of American Cities, New York: E.P. Dutton, p. 302+, OL 4120668M
- Richard A. Garcia (1991), Rise of the Mexican American middle class: San Antonio, 1929–1941, Texas A&M University Press, ISBN 0890963681
- Tejano Religion and Ethnicity, San Antonio, 1821–1860
- Jesús F. de la Teja (1995). San Antonio de Béxar: A Community on New Spain's Northern Frontier. University of New Mexico Press.
- Peter Skerry (1995), "San Antonio", Mexican Americans, Harvard University Press, OL 7693062M
- Rodolfo Rosales (2000). Illusion of Inclusion: The Political Story of San Antonio, Texas. University of Texas Press. ISBN 978-0-292-77103-1.

=== Published in the 21st century ===
- Char Miller, ed. (2001). On the Border: An Environmental History of San Antonio. University of Pittsburgh Press. ISBN 978-0-8229-7060-6.
- Judith Berg-Sobré (2003). San Antonio on Parade: Six Historic Festivals. Texas A&M University Press. ISBN 978-1-58544-222-5.
- David Goldfield, ed. (2007). "San Antonio, Texas". Encyclopedia of American Urban History. Sage. ISBN 978-1-4522-6553-7.
- Charles R. Porter (2009). Spanish Water, Anglo Water: Early Development in San Antonio. Texas A&M University Press. ISBN 978-1-60344-468-2.
- American Cities Project (November 11, 2013). "San Antonio". America's Big Cities in Volatile Times: City Profiles. Washington, DC: Pew Charitable Trusts.
