= Mexican American bibliography =

This is a Mexican American bibliography. This list consists of books, and journal articles, about Mexican Americans, Chicanos, and their history and culture. The list includes works of literature whose subject matter is significantly about Mexican Americans and the Chicano/a experience. This list does not include works by Mexican American writers which do not address the topic, such as science texts by Mexican American writers.

== Reference works ==
- Dictionary of Literary Biography, Volume 209: Chicano Writers, Third Series
- Borderline: A Bibliography of the United States-Mexico Borderlands (Massive tool for locating social sciences and humanities research materials dealing with the borderlands region. Some entries annotated; includes author index. Barbara G. Valk, et al., eds. Purdy/Kresge Library, LCCN Z 1251 .M44 V35 1988)
- Chicano Anthology Index: A Comprehensive Author, Title and Subject Index to Chicano Anthologies, 1965-1987 (Massive index to over 5000 essays and literary works about Chicanos. Includes subject, author, title indexes.) Francisco García-Ayvens. 1990. Purdy/Kresge Reference, LCCN Z1361.M4 G37 1990

== Biographies ==
- Garcia, Mario T. The Making of a Mexican-American Mayor: Raymond L. Telles and the Origins of Latino Political Power University of Arizona Press, 2018.

== Histories ==
=== Chicano Movement ===
- Cervantes, Leo. More than a century of the Chicano movement. 2004
- Chávez, Ernesto. "Mi raza primero!" (My people first!) : nationalism, identity, and insurgency in the Chicano movement in Los Angeles, 1966-1978 Berkeley : University of California Press, c2002. (available online from UC campuses: )
- Delgado, Abelardo B. The Chicano movement: some not too objective observations Denver, Colo.: distributed by Totinem Publications, 1971.
- García, Ignacio M. Chicanismo: the forging of a militant ethos among Mexican Americans Tucson : University of Arizona Press, 1997.
- Gómez-Quiñones, Juan, and Irene Vásquez. Making Aztlán: Ideology and Culture of the Chicana and Chicano Movement, 1966-1977 (2014), 460pp
- Mariscal, George. Brown-Eyed Children of the Sun: Lessons from the Chicano Movement 1965-1975. Albuquerque : University of New Mexico Press, 2005.
- Meier, Matt S.; Gutiérrez, Margo (2000). Encyclopedia of the Mexican American civil rights movement. Westport, CT: Greenwood. Archived from the original on 2014-10-04 – via Questia.
- Muñoz, Carlos. Youth, Identity, Power: The Chicano Movement. London and New York: Verso, 1989.
- Oropeza, Lorena. Raza sí!, guerra no!: Chicano protest and patriotism during the Viet Nam war era. Berkeley : University of California Press, 2005.
- Orozco, Cynthia E. (2010). No Mexicans, women, or dogs allowed: The rise of the Mexican American civil rights movement. Austin, TX: University of Texas Press. Archived from the original on 2013-12-13 – via Questia.
- Quiroz, Anthony (ed.), Leaders of the Mexican American Generation: Biographical Essays. Boulder, CO: University Press of Colorado, 2015.
- Rivas-Rodriguez, Maggie. Texas Mexican Americans and Postwar Civil Rights. Austin, TX: University of Texas Press, 2015.
- Rosales, F. Arturo (1997). Chicano! The History of the Mexican American Civil Rights Movement. Houston, TX: Arte Público Press. Archived from the original on 2013-02-04 – via Questia.
- San Miguel, Guadalupe. Brown, not white : school integration and the Chicano movement in Houston College Station : Texas A&M University Press, 2001.
- Sánchez, George I. "Ideology, and Whiteness in the Making of the Mexican American Civil Rights Movement, 1930–1960" Journal of Southern History (2006) 72#3 pp. 569–604 in JSTOR
- Treviño, Jesús Salvador. Eyewitness : a filmmaker’s memoir of the Chicano Movement Houston, Tex. : Arte Pʹublico Press, 2001.
- Trujillo, Armando L. Chicano empowerment and bilingual education : movimiento politics in Crystal City, Texas New York : Garland Pub., c1998.
- Vigil, Ernesto B. The Crusade for Justice: Chicano Militancy and the Government's War On Dissent Madison University of Wisconsin Press, 1999.

=== General histories ===
- Acuña, Rodolfo. Occupied America. New York: Harpercollins, 1988.
- Gonzales-Berry, Erlinda and David Maciel. Contested Homeland: a Chicano History of New Mexico. Albuquerque, NM: University of New Mexico Press, 2000.
- De Anda, Roberto M. Chicanas and Chicanos in Contemporary Society. Boston: Allyn and Bacon, 1996.
- Del Castillo, Richard Griswold. La Familia: Chicano Families in the Urban Southwest, 1848 to the Present. Notre Dame, IN: Notre Dame University Press, 1984.
- Foley, Neil. Mexicans in the Making of America. Cambridge, MA: Belknap Press, 2014.
- Iber, Jorge. Hispanics in the American West Santa Barbara, CA: ABC-CLIO, 2006.
- Martínez, Elizabeth "Betita". 500 Years of Chicana Women's History/500 Años de Historia Chicana. New Brunswick, NJ: Rutgers University Press, 2007.
- Meier, Matt S., and Feliciano Ribera. Mexican Americans/American Mexicans: From Conquistadors to Chicanos. New York: Hill and Wang, 1993.
- Sanchez, George J. Becoming Mexican American:Ethnicity, Culture, and Identity in Chicano Los Angeles. Berkeley, CA: University of California Press, 1993.
- Segura Camacho, Julian. The Chicano treatise Lanham, MD: University Press of America, 2005.
- Shane, C.J. (editor). The Mexicans. Farmington, MI: Greenhaven Press, 2005.
- Ruiz Vicki L. From Out of the Shadows: Mexican Women in Twentieth-Century America. NY: Oxford University Press, 1998.

== Other works ==
- Barrow, Lisa and Rouse, Cecilia Elena. "Do Returns to Schooling Differ by Race and Ethnicity?" American Economic Review 2005 95(2): 83–87. ISSN 0002-8282 Fulltext: in Ingenta and Ebsco
- Jack Citrin, Amy Lerman, Michael Murakami and Kathryn Pearson, "Testing Huntington: Is Hispanic Immigration a Threat to American Identity?" Perspectives on Politics, Volume 5, Issue 01, February 2007, pp 31–48
- De La Garza, Rodolfo O., Martha Menchaca, Louis DeSipio. Barrio Ballots: Latino Politics in the 1990 Elections (1994)
- De la Garza, Rodolfo O. Awash in the Mainstream: Latino Politics in the 1996 Elections (1999) * De la Garza, Rodolfo O., and Louis Desipio. Ethnic Ironies: Latino Politics in the 1992 Elections (1996)
- De la Garza, Rodolfo O. Et al. Latino Voices: Mexican, Puerto Rican, and Cuban Perspectives on American Politics (1992)
- Arnoldo De León, Mexican Americans in Texas: A Brief History, 2nd ed. (1999)
- Erlinda Gonzales-Berry, David R. Maciel, editors, The Contested Homeland: A Chicano History of New Mexico 2000, ISBN 0-8263-2199-2
- Nancie L. González; The Spanish-Americans of New Mexico: A Heritage of Pride (1969)
- Hero, Rodney E. Latinos and the U.S. Political System: Two-Tiered Pluralism. (1992)
- Garcia, F. Chris. Latinos and the Political System. (1988)
- Samuel P. Huntington. Who Are We: The Challenges to America's National Identity (2005)
- Kenski, Kate and Tisinger, Russell. "Hispanic Voters in the 2000 and 2004 Presidential General Elections." Presidential Studies Quarterly 2006 36(2): 189–202. ISSN 0360-4918 Fulltext: in Swetswise and Ingenta
- David Montejano, Anglos and Mexicans in the Making of Texas, 1836–1986 (1987)
- Pachon, Harry and Louis Desipio. New Americans by Choice: Political Perspectives of Latino Immigrants. (1994)
- Rosales, Francisco A., Chicano!: The history of the Mexican American civil rights movement. (1997). ISBN 978-1-55885-201-3
- Smith, Robert Courtney. Mexican New York: Transnational Lives of New Immigrants (2005), links with old village, based on interviews
- South, Scott J.; Crowder, Kyle; and Chavez, Erick. "Geographic Mobility and Spatial Assimilation among U.S. Latino Immigrants." International Migration Review 2005 39(3): 577–607. ISSN 0197-9183
- Suárez-Orozco, Marcelo M. And Mariela M. Páez. Latinos: Remaking America. (2002)
- Villarreal, Roberto E., and Norma G. Hernandez. Latinos and Political Coalitions: Political Empowerment for the 1990s (1991)
- Martha Menchaca (2002). Recovering History, Constructing Race: The Indian, Black, and White Roots of Mexican Americans. University of Texas Press. pp. 19–21. ISBN 978-0-292-75254-2.
- William A. Nericcio (2007). "Tex(t)-Mex: Seductive Hallucination of the 'Mexican' in America"; utpress book; book galleryblog
- John R. Chavez (1984). "The Lost Land: A Chicano Image of the American Southwest", New Mexico University Publications.

== Surveys and historiography ==
- Acuña, Rodolfo F. Occupied America: A History of Chicanos (2010)
- Bean, Frank D., and Marta Tienda. The Hispanic Population of the United States (1987), statistical analysis of demography and social structure
- Chabran, Richard, and Rafael Chabran. The Latino Encyclopedia (6 vol. 1996)
- De Leon, Arnoldo, and Carlos E. Cuéllar. "Chicanos in the City: A Review of the Monographic Literature," The History Teacher (1996) 29#3 pp. 363–378 in JSTOR
- De Leon, Arnoldo, and Richard Griswold Del Castillo. North to Aztlan: A History of Mexican Americans in the United States (2006)
- Garcia, Richard A. "Changing Chicano Historiography," Reviews in American History 34.4 (2006) 521–528 in Project MUSE
- Gomez, Laura E. Manifest Destinies: The Making of the Mexican American Race (2008)
- Gomez-Quiñones, Juan. Mexican American Labor, 1790-1990. (1994).
- Gonzales, Manuel G. Mexicanos: A History of Mexicans in the United States (2nd ed 2009) excerpt and text search
- Gutiérrez, David G. ed. The Columbia History of Latinos in the United States Since 1960 (2004) 512pp excerpt and text search
- Meier, Matt S. Notable Latino Americans: A Biographical Dictionary (1997) 431pp; 127 longer biographies excerpt and text search
- Meier, Matt S. Mexican American The biographies: A Historical Dictionary, 1836-1987 (1988) 237pp; 270 shortwer biographies
- Rochín, Refugio I., and Denis N. Valdés, eds. Voices of a New Chicana/o History. (2000). 307 pp. 14 articles by scholars
- Ruiz, Vicki L. "Nuestra América: Latino History as United States History," Journal of American History, 93 (Dec. 2006), 655–72.
- Ruiz, Vicki L. From Out of the Shadows: Mexican Women in Twentieth-Century America (1998)
- Vargas, Zaragosa. Crucible of Struggle: A History of Mexican Americans from the Colonial Period to the Present Era (2010)

== Pre 1965 ==
- Bogardus, Emory S. The Mexican in the United States (1934), sociological
- Escobedo, Elizabeth. From Coveralls to Zoot Suits: The Lives of Mexican American Women on the World War II Home Front (2013)
- Gamio, Manuel. The Life Story of the Mexican Immigrant (1931)
- Gamio, Manuel. Mexican Immigration to the United States (1939)
- García, Mario T. Mexican Americans: Leadership, Ideology and Identity, 1930–1960 (1989)
- Gomez-Quinones, Juan. Roots of Chicano Politics, 1600-1940 (1994)
- Grebler, Leo, Joan Moore, and Ralph Guzmán. The Mexican American People: The Nation's Second Largest Minority (1970), emphasis on census data and statistics
- Hernández, José Angel. Mexican American Colonization during the Nineteenth Century: A History of the U.S.-Mexico Borderlands (2012) excerpt and text search* Rivas-Rodríguez, Maggie ed. Mexican Americans and World War II (2005)
- Sanchez, George J. Becoming Mexican American: Ethnicity, Culture, and Identity in Chicano Los Angeles, 1900-1945 (1995) excerpt and text search

== Culture and politics, post 1965 ==
- Aranda, José, Jr. When We Arrive: A New Literary History of Mexican America. U. of Arizona Press, 2003. 256 pp.
- Arreola, Daniel D., ed. Hispanic Spaces, Latino Places: Community and Cultural Diversity in Contemporary America. 2004. 334 pp.
- Badillo, David A. Latinos and the New Immigrant Church. 2006. 275 pp. excerpt and text search
- Berg, Charles Ramírez. Latino Images in Film: Stereotypes, Subversion, and Resistance. 2002. 314 pp.
- Branton, Regina. "Latino Attitudes toward Various Areas of Public Policy: The Importance of Acculturation," Political Research Quarterly, Vol. 60, No. 2, 293-303 (2007) Abstract
- Burt, Kenneth C. The Search for a Civic Voice: California Latino Politics, Regina Books, 2007. Excerpts and online search from Amazon.com
- DeGenova, Nicholas and Ramos-Zayas, Ana Y. Latino Crossings: Mexicans, Puerto Ricans, and the Politics of Race and Citizenship. 2003. 257 pp.
- Dolan, Jay P., and Gilberto M. Hinojosa, eds. Mexican Americans and the Catholic Church, 1900-1965 (Volume 1, "Notre Dame History of Hispanic Catholics in the U.S." series), (University of Notre Dame Press, 1994).
- Francis-Fallon, Benjamin. The Rise of the Latino Vote: A History (2019)
- Fregoso, Rosa Linda. The Bronze Screen: Chicana and Chicano Film Culture. (1993) excerpt and text search
- Garcia, Ignacio M. Viva Kennedy: Mexican Americans in Search of Camelot, Texas A&M University Press, 2000. 227pp Excerpts and online search from Amazon.com.
- García, Mario T. Mexican Americans: Leadership, Ideology and Identity, 1930–1960 (1989)
- García, María Cristina. Seeking Refuge: Central American Migration to Mexico, The United States, and Canada. (2006) 290pp
- Gomez-Quinones, Juan. Chicano Politics: Reality and Promise, 1940-1990 (1990)
- Gutiérrez, David G. Walls and Mirrors: Mexican Americans, Mexican Immigrants, and the Politics of Ethnicity in the Southwest, 1910-1986 1995. excerpt and text search
- Gutiérrez, David G. "Migration, Emergent Ethnicity, and the "Third Space": The Shifting Politics of Nationalism in Greater Mexico" Journal of American History 1999 86(2): 481-517. in JSTOR covers 1800 to the 1980s
- Hammerback, John C., Richard J. Jensen, and Jose Angel Gutierrez. A War of Words: Chicano Protest in the 1960s and 1970s 1985.
- Martinez, Juan Francisco. Sea La Luz: The Making of Mexican Protestantism in the American Southwest, 1829-1900 (2006)
- Matovina, Timothy. Guadalupe and Her Faithful: Latino Catholics in San Antonio, from Colonial Origins to the Present. 2005. 232 pp. excerpt and text search
- Meier, Matt S., and Margo Gutierrez, ed. Encyclopedia of the Mexican American Civil Rights Movement (2000) excerpt and text search
- Ontiveros, Randy J. In the Spirit of a New People: The Cultural Politics of the Chicano Movement (New York University Press; 2013) 288 pages; how Chicano artists and activists of the 1960s and 1970s used fiction, poetry, visual arts, & theater
- Rosales, Francisco A., Chicano!: The history of the Mexican American civil rights movement, (Houston: Arte Público Press, 1997). ISBN 1-55885-201-8
- Saldívar-Hull, Sonia. Feminism on the Border: Chicana Gender Politics and Literature 2000. excerpt and text search
- Sears, David O., Felix Danbold, and Vanessa M. Zavala. "Incorporation of Latino immigrants into the American party system." RSF: The Russell Sage Foundation Journal of the Social Sciences 2 #3 (2016): 183-204. Online
- Wegner, Kyle David, "Children of Aztlán: Mexican American Popular Culture and the Post-Chicano Aesthetic" (PhD dissertation State University of New York, Buffalo, 2006). Order No. DA3213898.
- Vivancos Perez, Ricardo F. Radical Chicana Poetics (Palgrave Macmillan, 2013).

=== Voting since 2000 ===
- Barreto, Matt A., and Loren Collingwood. "Group-based appeals and the Latino vote in 2012: How immigration became a mobilizing issue." Electoral Studies 40 (2015): 490-499. Online
- Bell, Aaron. "The Role of the Latino Vote in the 2016 Elections." (2016). Online
- Coffin, Malcolm. "The Latino Vote: Shaping Americas Electoral Future". Political Quarterly. 74#2 (2003): 214–222. doi:10.1111/1467-923x.00531
- Collingwood, Loren, Matt A. Barreto, and Sergio I. Garcia-Rios. "Revisiting Latino voting: Cross-racial mobilization in the 2012 election." Political Research Quarterly 67.3 (2014): 632-645. online
- Francis-Fallon, Benjamin. The Rise of the Latino Vote: A History (Harvard UP, 2019).
- Leal, David L., et al. "The Latino vote in the 2004 election." PS: Political Science & Politics 38.1 (2005): 41-49. online
- Kenski, Kate and Tisinger, Russell. "Hispanic Voters in the 2000 and 2004 Presidential General Elections." Presidential Studies Quarterly 2006 36(2): 189-202. ISSN 0360-4918
- Lopez, Mark Hugo, and Ana Gonzalez-Barrera. "Inside the 2012 Latino electorate." ( Pew 2013) online.
- Nicholson, Stephen P., Adrian Pantoja, and Gary M. Segura. "Political knowledge and issue voting among the Latino electorate." Political Research Quarterly 59.2 (2006): 259-271. Online
- Nuño, Stephen A. "Latino mobilization and vote choice in the 2000 presidential election." American Politics Research 35.2 (2007): 273-293. Online
- Reny, Tyler, Bryan Wilcox-Archuleta, and Vanessa Cruz Nichols. "Threat, Mobilization, and Latino Voting in the 2018 Election." The Forum 16#4 (2018) online
- Sanchez, Gabriel R., and Barbara Gomez-Aguinaga. "Latino Rejection of the Trump Campaign." Aztlán: A Journal of Chicano Studies 42.2 (2017). Online

== Discrimination ==
- Barkan, Elliott R. “Return of the Nativists? California Public Opinion and Immigration in the 1980s and 1990s.” Social Science History 27#2 2003, pp. 229–83. online
- Durán, Robert J., and Jason A. Campos. "The war on gangs and gangsters: The Latino/a experience with settler colonialism." in Routledge International Handbook of Critical Gang Studies (Routledge, 2021) pp. 271-283.
- Gonzales, Phillip B., Renato Rosaldo, and Mary Louise Pratt, eds. Trumpism, Mexican America, and the Struggle for Latinx Citizenship (U of New Mexico Press, 2021).
- Guglielmo, Thomas A. “Fighting for Caucasian Rights: Mexicans, Mexican Americans, and the Transnational Struggle for Civil Rights in World War II Texas.” Journal of American History 92#4, 2006, pp. 1212–37. online
- Hartman, Todd K., Benjamin J. Newman, and C. Scott Bell. "Decoding prejudice toward Hispanics: Group cues and public reactions to threatening immigrant behavior." Political Behavior 36.1 (2014): 143-163. online also see abridged version.
- Hoffman, Abraham. "Stimulus to repatriation: The 1931 federal deportation drive and the Los Angeles Mexican community." Pacific Historical Review 42.2 (1973): 205-219. online
- Hoffman, Abraham. Unwanted Mexican Americans in the great depression: repatriation pressures, 1929-1939 (1974) online.
- Kang, Yowei, and Kenneth C.C. Yang. "Communicating Racism and Xenophobia in the Era of Donald Trump: A Computational Framing Analysis of the US-Mexico Cross-Border Wall Discourses." Howard Journal of Communications 33.2 (2022): 140-159.
- López, Ian F. Haney. Racism on trial: The Chicano fight for justice ( Harvard University Press, 2004).
- López, Ian F. Haney. Racism on trial: The Chicano fight for justice ( Harvard University Press, 2004).
- Muñoz, Carlos. "The Chicano Movement: Mexican American history and the struggle for equality." Perspectives on global development and technology 17.1-2 (2018): 31-52.
- Urbina, Martin Guevara, and Sofía Stefani Espinoza Álvarez, eds. Hispanics in the US criminal justice system: Ethnicity, ideology, and social control (Charles C Thomas Publisher, 2018). online.
- Verea, Mónica. "Anti-immigrant and Anti-Mexican attitudes and policies during the first 18 months of the Trump Administration." Norteamérica 13.2 (2018): 197-226. online
- Willis-Esqueda, Cynthia. "Bad characters and desperados: latinxs and causal explanations for legal system bias." UCLA Law Review 67 (2020): 1204+. online

== Regional and Local ==
=== California ===
- Bancroft, Hubert Howe. vol 18-24, History of California to 1890
- Bedolla, Lisa García. Fluid Borders: Latino Power, Identity, and Politics in Los Angeles. 2005. 279 pp.
- Burt, Kenneth C. The Search for a Civic Voice: California Latino Politics (2007) excerpt and text search
- Camarillo, Albert. Chicanos in a Changing Society: From Mexican Pueblos to American Barrios in Santa Barbara and Southern California, 1848–1930 (1979)
- Camarillo, Albert M., "Cities of Color: The New Racial Frontier in California’s Minority-Majority Cities," Pacific Historical Review, 76 (Feb. 2007), 1–28; looks at cities of Compton, East Palo Alto, and Seaside
- Chavez, Ernesto. "Mi Raza Primero! (My People First!): Nationalism, Identity, and Insurgency in the Chicano Movement in Los Angeles, 1966-1978." 2002. 166 pp.
- Daniel, Cletus E. Bitter Harvest: A History of California Farmworkers, 1870-1941 1981.
- García, Matt. A World of Its Own: Race, Labor, and Citrus in the Making of Greater Los Angeles, 1900-1970 (2001),
- Hayes-Bautista, David E. La Nueva California: Latinos in the Golden State. U. of California Press, 2004. 263 pp. excerpt and text search
- Hughes, Charles. "The Decline of the Californios: The Case of San Diego, 1846-1856" The Journal of San Diego History Summer 1975, Volume 21, Number 3 online at
- McWilliams, Carey. North from Mexico. (1949), farm workers in California
- Pitt, Leonard. The Decline of the Californios: A Social History of the Spanish-Speaking Californians, 1846-1890 (ISBN 0-520-01637-8)
- Sánchez; George J. Becoming Mexican American: Ethnicity, Culture, and Identity in Chicano Los Angeles, 1900-1945 (1993) excerpt and text search
- Valle, Victor M. and Torres, Rodolfo D. Latino Metropolis. 2000. 249 pp. on Los Angeles

=== Texas and Southwest ===
- Alonzo, Armando C. Tejano Legacy: Rancheros and Settlers in South Texas, 1734-1900 (1998)
- Hubert Howe Bancroft. The Works of Hubert Howe Bancroft,
  - v 15: History of the North Mexican States and Texas, Volume 1: 1531 - 1800
  - v 16 History of the North Mexican States and Texas, Volume 2: 1801 - 1889
  - Vol. 17 History of Arizona and New Mexico 1530-1888) (1889)
- Bancroft, Hubert Howe. v 15: History of the North Mexican States and Texas, Volume 1: 1531 - 1800; v 16 History of the North Mexican States and Texas, Volume 2: 1801 - 1889
- Bancroft, Hubert Howe. Vol. 17 History of Arizona and New Mexico 1530-1888) (1889)
- Blackwelder, Julia Kirk. Women of the Depression: Caste and Culture in San Antonio 1984. excerpt and text search
- Buitron Jr., Richard A. The Quest for Tejano Identity in San Antonio, Texas, 1913-2000 (2004) excerpt and text search
- Chávez, John R. The Lost Land: The Chicano Image of the Southwest (Albuquerque, 1984)
- Chávez-García, Miroslava. Negotiating Conquest: Gender and Power in California, 1770s to 1880s (2004).
- De León, Arnoldo. They Called Them Greasers: Anglo Attitudes toward Mexicans in Texas, 1821–1900 (Austin, 1983)
- De León, Arnoldo. Mexican Americans in Texas: A Brief History, 2nd ed. (1999)
- De León, Arnoldo. “Whither Tejano History: Origins, Development, and Status,” Southwestern Historical Quarterly 106 (January 2003) 349–364. historiography
- Deutsch, Sarah No Separate Refuge: Culture, Class, and Gender on the Anglo-Hispanic Frontier in the American Southwest, 1880-1940 1987
- Dysart, Jane. "Mexican Women in San Antonio, 1830-1860: The Assimilation Process" Western Historical Quarterly 7 (October 1976): 365-375. in JSTOR
- Echeverría, Darius V., "Aztlán Arizona: Abuses, Awareness, Animosity, and Activism amid Mexican-Americans, 1968–1978" PhD dissertation (Temple University, 2006). Order No. DA3211867.
- Fregoso; Rosa Linda. Mexicana Encounters: The Making of Social Identities on the Borderlands (2003)
- García, Richard A. Rise of the Mexican American Middle Class: San Antonio, 1929-1941 (1991)
- García, Mario T. Desert Immigrants. The Mexicans of El Paso, 1880-1920 (1982) 348 pp. * Getz; Lynne Marie. Schools of Their Own: The Education of Hispanos in New Mexico, 1850-1940 (1997)
- Glasrud, Bruce A. et al. eds. Discovering Texas History, (U of Oklahoma Press, 2014), essays by scholars;
- Gómez-Quiñones, Juan. Roots of Chicano Politics, 1600-1940 (1994)
- Gonzales-Berry, Erlinda, David R. Maciel, eds, The Contested Homeland: A Chicano History of New Mexico, 314 pages (2000), ISBN 0-8263-2199-2
- González; Nancie L. The Spanish-Americans of New Mexico: A Heritage of Pride (1969)
- Guglielmo, Thomas A. “Fighting for Caucasian Rights: Mexicans, Mexican Americans, and the Transnational Struggle for Civil Rights in World War II Texas.” Journal of American History 92#4, 2006, pp. 1212–37. online
- Gutiérrez; Ramón A. When Jesus Came, the Corn Mothers Went Away: Marriage, Sexuality, and Power in New Mexico, 1500-1846 (1991)
- Márquez, Benjamin. LULAC: The Evolution of a Mexican American Political Organization (1993)
- Matovina, Timothy M. Tejano Religion and Ethnicity, San Antonio, 1821-1860 (1995)
- Montejano, David. Anglos and Mexicans in the Making of Texas, 1836-1986 (1987)
- Muñoz, Laura K., "Desert Dreams: Mexican American Education in Arizona, 1870–1930" (PhD dissertation Arizona State University, 2006). Order No. DA3210182.
- Quintanilla, Linda J., "Chicana Activists of Austin and Houston, Texas: A Historical Analysis" (University of Houston, 2005). Order No. DA3195964.
- Sánchez; George I. Forgotten People: A Study of New Mexicans (1940; reprint 1996) on New Mexico
- Taylor, Paul S. Mexican Labor in the United States. 2 vols. 1930-1932, on Texas
- Stewart, Kenneth L., and Arnoldo De León. Not Room Enough: Mexicans, Anglos, and Socioeconomic Change in Texas, 1850-1900 (1993)
- de la Teja, Jesús F. San Antonio de Béxar: A Community on New Spain's Northern Frontier (1995).
- Tijerina, Andrés. Tejanos and Texas under the Mexican Flag, 1821-1836 (1994),
- Tijerina, Andrés. Tejano Empire: Life on the South Texas Ranchos (1998).
- Timmons, W. H. El Paso: A Borderlands History (1990).
- Trevino, Roberto R. The Church in the Barrio: Mexican American Ethno-Catholicism in Houston. (2006). 308pp.
- Weber, David J. The Mexican Frontier, 1821-1846: The American Southwest under Mexico (1982)

=== Other regions ===
- Allegro, Linda and Andrew Grant Wood, eds. Latin American Migrations to the U.S. Heartland: Changing Social Landscapes in Middle America (University of Illinois Press; 2013) 344 pages; on the growth of the Latino work force in Oklahoma, Kansas, Nebraska, Arkansas, Missouri, and Iowa.
- Bullock, Charles S., III and Hood, M. V., III. "A Mile-wide Gap: the Evolution of Hispanic Political Emergence in the Deep South." Social Science Quarterly 2006 87 (special Issue): 1117-1135. ISSN 0038-4941 Fulltext: in Blackwell Synergy
- Chavez, Thomas E. Spain and the Independence of the United States. University of New Mexico Press (2004), 424 pp.
- García, María Cristina. Havana, USA: Cuban Exiles and Cuban Americans in South Florida, 1959–1994 (1996); excerpt and text search
- Korrol, Virginia Sánchez. From Colonia to Community: The History of Puerto Ricans in New York City, 1917–1948 (1994)
- Millard, Ann V. and Chapa, Jorge. Apple Pie and Enchiladas: Latino Newcomers in the Rural Midwest. 2004. 276 pp. excerpt and text search
- Murphy, Arthur D., Colleen Blanchard, and Jennifer A. Hill, eds. Latino Workers in the Contemporary South. 2001. 224 pp.
- Padilla, Felix M. Puerto Rican Chicago. (1987). 277 pp.
- Sãnchez Korrol, Virginia E. From Colonia to Community: The History of Puerto Ricans in New York City. (1994) complete text online free in California; excerpt and text search
- Vargas, Zaragosa. Proletarians of the North: A History of Mexican Industrial Workers in Detroit and the Midwest, 1917-1933 (1993) complete text online free in California; excerpt and text search
- Whalen, Carmen Teresa, and Victor Vásquez-Hernández, eds. The Puerto Rican Diaspora: Historical Perspectives (2005),

== Primary sources ==
- Ellis, Richard, ed. New Mexico Past and Present: A Historical Reader. 1971.
- Mintz, Steven, ed. Mexican American Voices: A Documentary Reader. 2009.
- Moquin, Wayne, and Charles Van Doren, eds. A documentary history of the Mexican Americans (1971) online
- Weber, David J. ed. Foreigners in Their Native Land: Historical Roots of the Mexican Americans (1973), primary sources to 1912

== Chicano literature ==
- Augenbraum, Harold; Fernández Olmos, Margarite (1997), "Introduction: An American Literary Tradition", in Augenbraum, Harold; Fernández Olmos, Margarite (eds.), The Latino Reader, Boston: Houghton Mifflin, ISBN 978-0-395-76528-9.
- Calderón, Héctor; Saldívar, José David (1991), "Editors' Introduction: Criticism in the Borderlands", in Calderón, Héctor; Saldívar, José David (eds.), Criticism in the Borderlands: Studies in Chicano Literature, Culture, and Ideology, Durham, North Carolina: Duke University Press, ISBN 978-0-8223-1143-0.
- Dowling, Lee (2006), "La Florida del Inca: Garcilaso's Literary Sources", in Galloway, Patricia Kay (ed.), The Hernando de Soto Expedition: History, Historiography, and "Discovery" in the Southeast, Lincoln, NE: University of Nebraska Press, ISBN 978-0-8032-7122-7.
- García, Mario T. (2000), Luis Leal: An Auto/Biography, Austin, Texas: University of Texas Press, ISBN 978-0-292-72829-5.
- Paredes, Raymund (Fall 1995), "Teaching Chicano Literature: An Historical Approach", The Heath Anthology of American Literature Newsletter (12).
- Prampolini, Gaetano, and Annamaria Pinazzi (eds). "The Shade of the Saguaro/La sombra del saguaro" Part II 'Mexican-American'. Firenze University Press http://www.fupress.com/ (2013): 149–342.
- Saldívar, Ramón (1990), Chicano Narrative: The Dialectics of Difference, Madison, Wisconsin: The University of Wisconsin Press, ISBN 978-0-299-12474-8.
- Vivancos Perez, Ricardo F. Radical Chicana Poetics. London and New York: Palgrave Macmillan, 2013.

== Works of fiction ==
- Bless Me, Ultima, Rudolfo Anaya (1972)
- The House on Mango Street
- Zoot Suit

== See also ==
- List of bibliographies on American history
