= Huck =

Huck may refer to:

== Characters ==
- Huckleberry Finn, a character in four novels by Mark Twain
- Huckleberry Hound, a cartoon character created by animation studio Hanna-Barbera
- Huck, a character on Scandal
- Huck, a character in the eponymous comic book series by Mark Millar

== People ==
- Huck (surname)
- Huck (nickname)

== Other uses ==
- Huck (magazine), a bi-monthly, independent magazine, website and video platform
- A deep throw for high gain toward the end-zone in the sport of Ultimate

== See also ==
- Huckleberry (disambiguation)
- Hucks, a surname and given name
- Hueck (surname)
