= Timeline of Corpus Christi, Texas =

The following is a timeline of the history of the city of Corpus Christi, Texas, USA.

== Prior to 19th century ==
- 1519 - Spaniard Alonso Alvarez de Pineda travels to bay on day of religious Feast of Corpus Christi.

== 19th century ==
- 1821
  - Mexico gains independence from Spain
  - The Old Indian Trading Grounds become part of Mexico.
- 1828
  - Known as the Old Indian Trading Grounds.
  - Manuel de Mier y Terán toured through Mexico's province of Texas. Terán noted that some officials favored Corpus Christi as a port, referring to the area on the bay since there was no settlement called Corpus Christi at the time.
- 1829 - Traders are known to have landed on the coast on the Corpus Christi Bay. No civilization is apparent to traders.
- 1836
  - Texas gains independence from Mexico
  - The Old Indian Trading Grounds become part of the Republic of Texas although the area was claimed by both Texas and Mexico.
- 1839 - Henry Kinney sets up trading post (also known as "Kinney's Ranch").
- 1840
  - On January 17 the unrecognized country of the Republic of the Rio Grande claimed the area south of the Nueces River which included Kinney's Ranch.
  - On November 6 the Republic of the Rio Grande collapsed.
  - Possession of the area returns to the Republic of Texas while Mexico still claimed the area as its own.
- 1845
  - August: Kinney's Ranch becomes a major U.S. military outpost under command of Zachary Taylor.
  - December 29: Kinney's Ranch becomes part of the United States of America after annexation of the Republic of Texas.
- 1846
  - March: U.S. military troops depart.
  - Town becomes seat of newly created Nueces County.
- 1847 - Town renamed "Corpus Christi" ("something more definite for a postmark on letters.")
- 1852
  - September 9: Corpus Christi incorporated.
  - Residents elect city council and mayor, Benjamin F. Neal, who served from 1852 to 1855.
- 1860 - Population: 175.
- 1861 - Corpus Christi becomes part of the Confederate States of America.
- 1862 - August: Town besieged by U.S. forces.
- 1865 - Confederate States of America collapse and possession returns to the United States of America.
- 1870 - Population: 2,140.
- 1875 - Conflict between "local settlers and Mexicans."
- 1876 - A city charter was adopted.
- 1883 - Corpus Christi Caller newspaper begins publication.
- 1890 - Population: 4,387.

== 20th century ==
- 1910 - Population: 8,222.
- 1911 - Corpus Christi Times newspaper begins publication.
- 1912 - Roman Catholic Diocese of Corpus Christi established.
- 1914
  - County courthouse constructed.
  - August 1: Rotary Club of Corpus Christi chartered, the 125th club of Rotary International. Rotary was instrumental in the early development of Corpus Christi, the Chamber of Commerce, and the Port.
- 1919 - September: Hurricane occurs.
- 1926
  - September: Port of Corpus Christi opens.
  - Intracoastal Waterway opens.
- 1927 - Corpus Christi Public Library established.
- 1928 - Grande Theatre built.
- 1929
  - League of United Latin American Citizens founded.
  - Corpus Christi Caller-Times newspaper in publication.
- 1930
  - Oil discovered in vicinity of Corpus Christi.
  - Population: 27,741.
- 1935 - Del Mar College founded.
- 1937 - KRIS radio begins broadcasting.
- 1940
  - Beach Theater in business.
  - Population: 57,301.
- 1941
  - March 12: U.S. military Naval Air Station Corpus Christi commissioned.
  - "Sea wall" built.
- 1947 - University of Corpus Christi founded.
- 1950
  - North Padre Island Causeway opens.
  - Population: 108,287.
- 1951 - Osage Drive-In cinema in business.
- 1956 - KRIS-TV and KZTV (television) begin broadcasting.
- 1957
  - Corpus Christi Museum of Science and History established.
  - Astor Restaurant established
- 1959 - Harbor Bridge opens.
- 1960 - Corpus Christi International Airport opens.
- 1968
  - Frances Farenthold elected to Texas House of Representatives from the 45th district.
  - Padre Island National Seashore dedicated near city.
- 1970
  - August 3–4: Hurricane Celia occurs.
  - Population: 204,525.
- 1972 - Art Museum of South Texas established.
- 1980 - August: Hurricane Allen occurs.
- 1981 - Sunrise Mall in business.
- 1983
  - "Selena Quintanilla Pérez of Corpus Christi wins the Tejano Music Award."
  - Solomon Porfirio Ortiz becomes U.S. representative for Texas's 27th congressional district.
- 1985 - Port of Corpus Christi designated a foreign trade zone by U.S. Department of Commerce.
- 1989 - Texas A&M University–Corpus Christi active.
- 1990
  - Texas State Aquarium opens.
  - Greyhound Race Track in business.
- 1991 - USS Lexington Museum established.
- 1995 - March 31: Pop singer Selena shot and killed.
- 1998 - City website online.
- 2000 - Population: 277,454.

== 21st century ==
- 2003 - Corpus Christi designated an All-America City.
- 2004 - December 24: Snowstorm occurs.
- 2007 - Senor Jaime's erected a 12 ft Rooster which is now a city monument.
- 2010
  - Only a Handful releases the Corpus Christi theme song "I'm from Corpus"
  - Population: 305,215.
- 2011 - Blake Farenthold becomes U.S. representative for Texas's 27th congressional district.

== See also ==
- History of Corpus Christi, Texas
- List of mayors of Corpus Christi, Texas
- National Register of Historic Places listings in Nueces County, Texas
- Timelines of other cities in the South Texas area of Texas: Brownsville, Laredo, McAllen, San Antonio

== Bibliography ==
- "Corpus Christi". Texas State Gazetteer and Business Directory. Detroit: R.L. Polk & Co. 1890 – via Internet Archive.
- Mary A. Sutherland (1916). Story of Corpus Christi. Daughters of the Confederacy, Corpus Christi Chapter.
- Coleman McCampbell, Saga of a Frontier Seaport (Dallas: South-West, 1934)
- Federal Writers' Project (1940), "Corpus Christi", Texas: A Guide to the Lone Star State, American Guide Series, New York: Hastings House, pp. 215–223, hdl:2027/mdp.39015002677667 – via HathiTrust
- Federal Writers' Project (1942), Corpus Christi, a History and Guide, American Guide Series, Corpus Christi Caller-Times, OCLC 2674098
- Coleman McCampbell, Texas Seaport: The Story of the Growth of Corpus Christi and the Coastal Bend Area (New York: Exposition, 1952)
- Corpus Christi: 100 Years (Corpus Christi Caller-Times, 1952)
- Harland Bartholomew and Associates (1967), Comprehensive Plan: Corpus Christi, St. Louis
- Dan E. Kilgore, "Corpus Christi: A Quarter Century of Development, 1900–1925," Southwestern Historical Quarterly 75 (April 1972).
- Dan Kilgore, Nueces County, Texas, 1750–1800: A Bicentennial Memoir (Corpus Christi: Friends of the Corpus Christi Museum, 1975)
- Bill Walraven, Corpus Christi: The History of a Texas Seaport (Woodland Hills, California, 1982)
- Eugenia Reynolds Briscoe, City by the Sea: A History of Corpus Christi, Texas, 1519–1875 (New York: Vantage, 1985)
- Paul T. Hellmann (2006). "Texas: Corpus Christi". Historical Gazetteer of the United States. Taylor & Francis. ISBN 1-135-94859-3.
- Bruce A. Glasrud; et al. (2012). African Americans in Corpus Christi. Images of America. Arcadia. ISBN 978-0-7385-8528-4.
- Alan Lessoff (2015). Where Texas Meets the Sea: Corpus Christi and Its History. University of Texas Press. ISBN 978-0-292-77192-5.
- David G. McComb (2015). "Coastal Ports: Corpus Christi". The City in Texas: a History. University of Texas Press. pp. 83+. ISBN 978-0-292-76746-1.

== Images ==
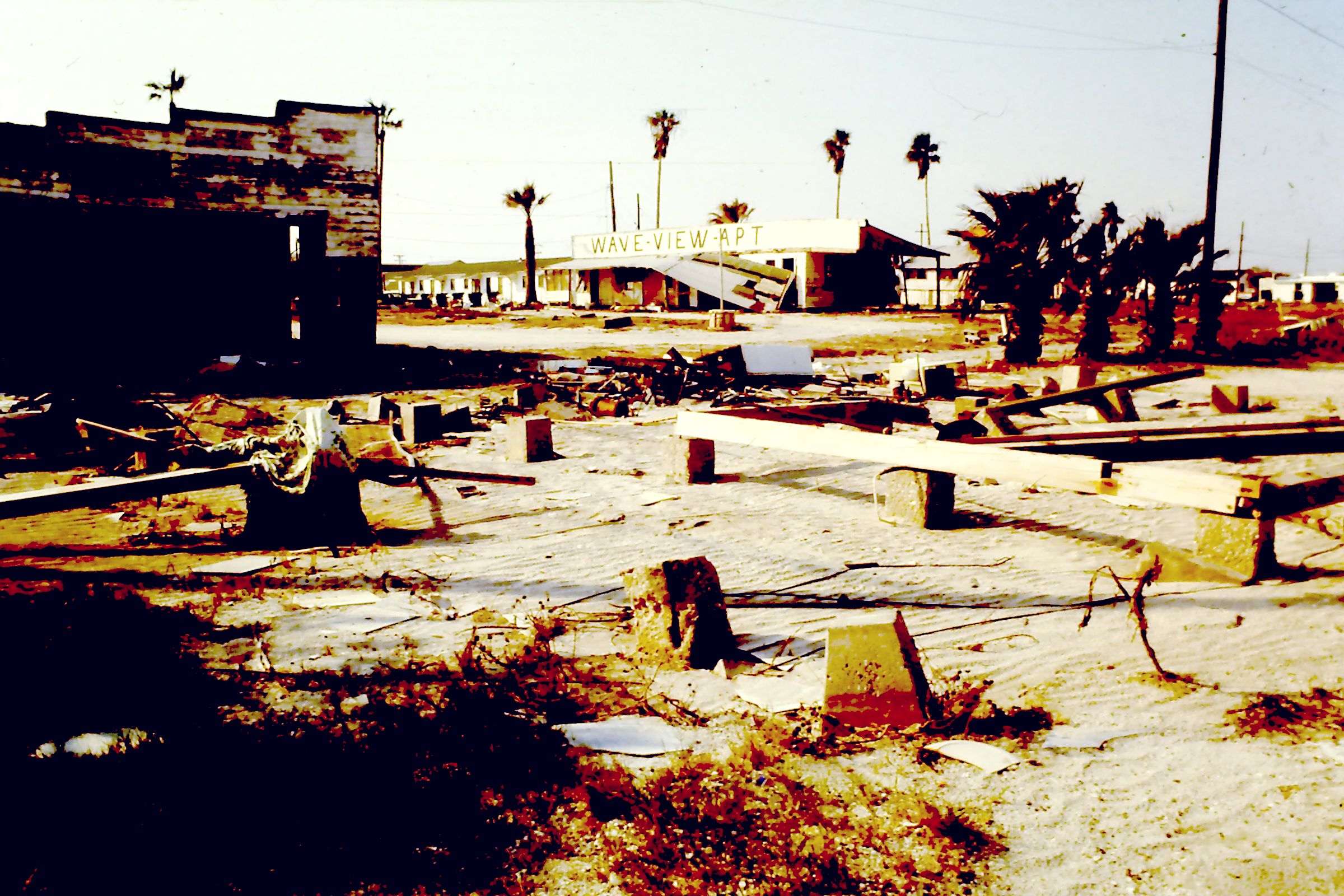
After Hurricane Allen, 1980

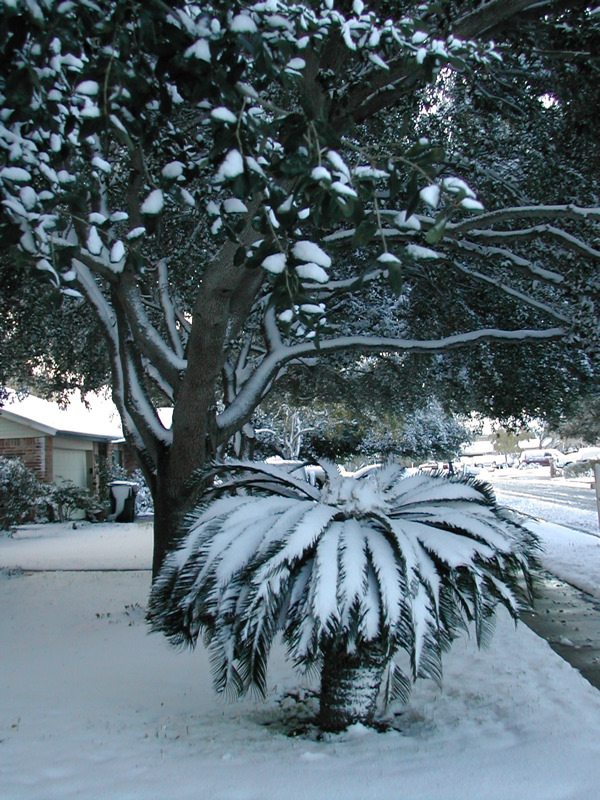
Snow in Corpus Christi, 2004
