= Huyck =

Surname list

Huyck is a surname. Notable people with this surname include:

- Kevin Huyck, American Air Force general
- Thomas Huyck (died 1575), English prelate
- Willard Huyck (born 1945), American screenwriter and director
- Willard M. Huyck (1917–2018), American politician and soldier

== See also ==
- Huck (surname)
