= Huck (nickname) =

As a nickname, Huck may refer to:

- Huck Betts (1897–1987), American Major League Baseball pitcher
- McDill "Huck" Boyd (1907–1987), American small-town newspaper publisher and politician
- Huck Flener (born 1969), American former Major League Baseball pitcher
- Huck Geary (1917–1981), American Major League Baseball player
- Mike Huckleberry (born 1948), American politician and restaurateur
- Hector Macpherson, Jr. (1918–2015), American retired politician and dairy farmer
- Carl Sawyer (1890–1957), American Major League Baseball player in 1915
- Richard Scarry (1919–1994), American children's author and illustrator
- Huck Seed (born 1969), American poker player
- Huck Wallace (1882–1951), American Major League Baseball pitcher in 1912
- Huck Welch (1907–1979), Hall of Fame Canadian Football League player
- Allan Woodman (1899–1963), Canadian hockey player

== See also ==
- Huck (disambiguation)
- Huck (surname)
