= Huckleberry (disambiguation) =

Huckleberry is a common name used in North America for several species of plants.

Huckleberry may also refer to:

== Places ==
- Huckleberry Island, in Long Island Sound and part of New Rochelle, New York
- Huckleberry Botanic Regional Preserve, in the eastern San Francisco Bay area of California

== People ==
- Huckleberry "Huck" Seed (born 1969), American poker player
- Alan Huckleberry (1941–2025), American mathematician
- Earl Huckleberry (1910–1999), American Major League Baseball pitcher
- Mike Huckleberry (born 1948), politician, restaurateur, and small business owner in Michigan

== Other uses ==
- Huckleberry Finn, title character in Adventures of Huckleberry Finn by Mark Twain
- Huckleberry Hound, a cartoon character
- Huckleberry Railroad, a narrow gauge heritage railroad near Flint, Michigan
- Huckleberry Trail, a rail trail in Montgomery County, Virginia

== See also ==
- Huckleberry Ridge Tuff, a geologic formation that lies partially in Yellowstone National Park
- Huck (disambiguation)
- Solanum scabrum, a garden huckleberry in the family Solanaceae
- Cyrilla racemiflora, called "he huckleberry", in the family Cyrillaceae
