= Hueco =

Hueco may refer to:

- Hueco or Waco people, a Wichita people in the Southern Plains Native American tribe that inhabited northeastern Texas
- Hueco (mountain), mountain in the Vilcanota mountain range Andes of Peru
- Hueco Formation, geologic formation in west Texas and southern New Mexico
- Hueco Mountains, range of mountains that rise in southern Otero County, New Mexico and Texas
- Alamo Hueco Mountains, long mountain range, located in the southeast of the New Mexico Bootheel region
- Hueco Rock Rodeo, bouldering competition held annually in El Paso, Texas
- Hueco Tanks State Park and Historic Site, state park in El Paso County, Texas

== See also ==
- Hueck
