= Hueck =

The surname Hueck or von Hueck may refer to:

- Alfredo Hueck (born 1980), Venezuelan film producer and director
- Alexander Friedrich von Hueck (1802–1842), Baltic-German professor of anatomy
- Cornelio Hüeck, Nicaraguan politician from Somoza era
- Else Hueck-Dehio (1897–1976), German author
- Karl Johann von Hueck (1844–1925), Estonian politician

== See also ==
- Huck (surname)
- Huyck
