= Ella Austin Orphanage =

Orphanage in San Antonio, Texas

Ella Austin Orphanage was an African American owned and operated orphanage in San Antonio, Texas. It grew out of the home of Ella and Edward Austin, moved to larger premises, and became established in 1897. As well as serving children in need it became a hub for local community and philanthropic endeavors. It closed in 1968, but the Ella Austin Community Center continues to honor her legacy.

== Ella Austin ==
Born in Ohio on February 17, 1856, Ella Stephens married Edward Austin, a South Carolina-born veteran, in Washington, Ohio, on June 29, 1879. However, by 1880 Ella and Edward had moved to San Antonio and opened their West side home to children in need. By 1897 they had taken in so many children that their home officially became an orphanage. Eventually the overcrowded conditions led to the purchase of a two-story structure on the East Side at 1920 Burnet Street.

== Orphanage ==
From the very beginning the orphanage developed as a center point of community involvement and support. Within the first years of Ella Austin’s Orphanage the Progressive Women’s Club, a leading black philanthropic organization in San Antonio, became involved as caretakers and fundraisers. Members of this organization describe how Mrs. Austin founded the Progressive Women as a group that would support philanthropic endeavors in the community, particularly the work of the children’s home. Their work paved the way for the continuation of the orphanage even after Ella Austin died as a result of heart disease on November 5, 1902. She was 46 years old.

Despite Mrs. Austin’s death her vision lived on through the support the orphanage received from the community. In the years that followed, the Progressive Women worked to develop the shelter, among other things providing blankets and food. During this time, the home’s physical structure began to deteriorate and community members began to worry about the building. In response, the Progressive Women’s Club began a fundraiser to raise money for the necessary renovations. Unfortunately, as a San Antonio Light article described, the fears about the building proved well-founded when the orphanage became damaged by a fire in 1932. After the fire, the Club increased their efforts and led a community wide drive to raise funds for a new building. Soon the money was raised and a new orphanage was built, becoming a day center for community seniors in addition to remaining a home for orphans.

Accounts of the orphanage describe how the home was known as a safe place with good care. Parents would even pay a bit of money to leave their children at the home when they traveled out of the city, demonstrating not only the trust the community placed in this organization but high standards of Ella Austin’s orphanage. The orphanage continued to serve the community providing both orphan care and facilities for senior activities until its closing in 1968.

== Continuing legacy ==
Soon after the orphanage closed, in order to meet new and changing needs of the neighborhood, the Ella Austin Community Center was opened November 1, 1968, at the same location on Burnet Street. Although now in a different location, today the community center continues to honor the legacy of Ella Austin and her orphanage by serving San Antonio. In recent years Ella Austin Community Center has been the site of numerous activities and programs that offer resources to the surrounding neighborhood and the entire city. As continues to grow the agency seeks to build off of the historical significance of Mrs. Ella Austin’s orphanage while remaining an important source of social services for San Antonio.
