= Rincon School =

School in San Antonio, Texas

- Riverside School (1890–1904), Frederick Douglass School (1904–1933); Brackenridge Colored School
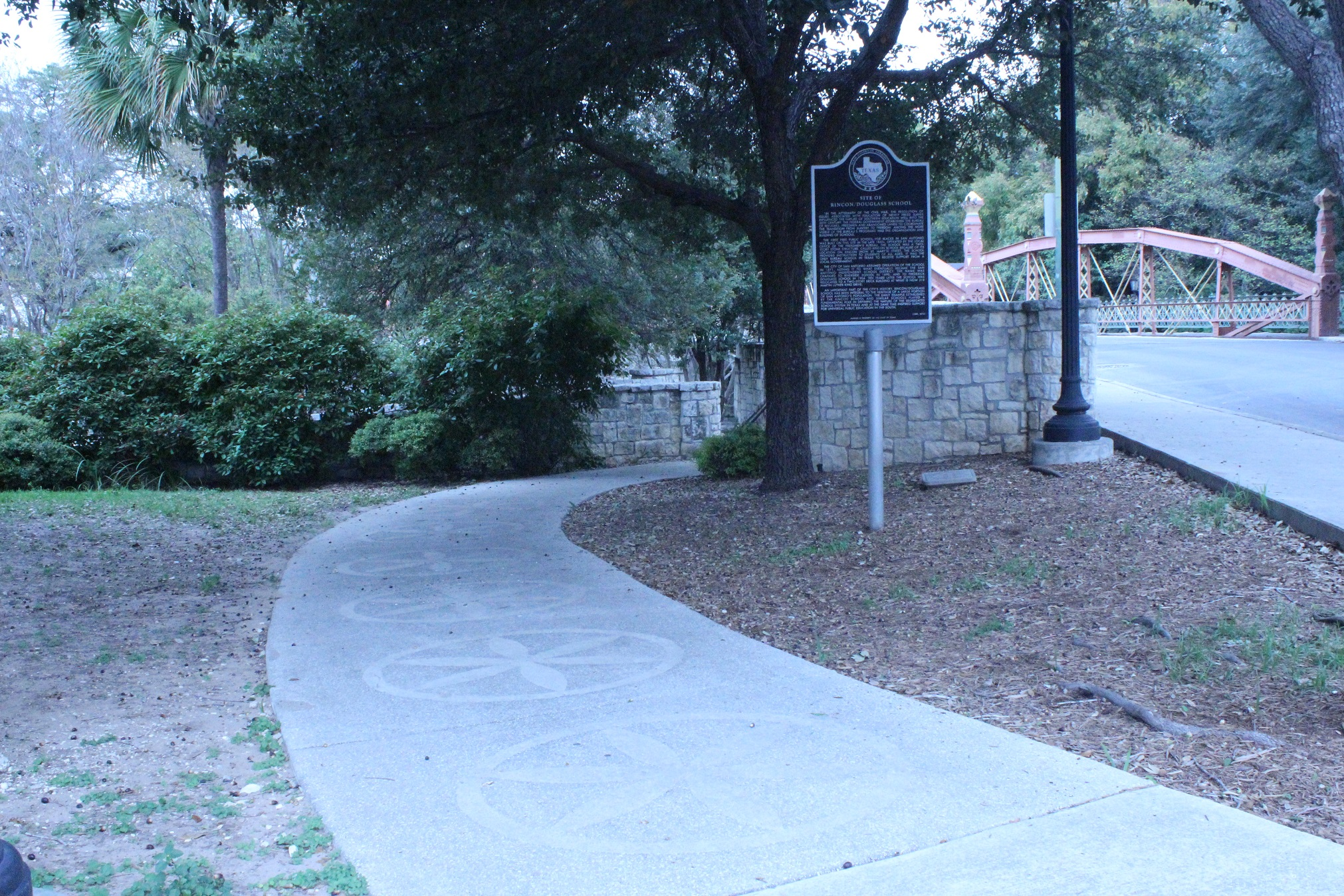
- Historical marker near downtown San Antonio, Texas
- Location: 204 Augusta Street, San Antonio, Bexar County, Texas, United States
- Coordinates: 29.429961°N 98.492498°W
- Founded: c. late 1860s

Recorded Texas Historic Landmark
- Designated: 1989
- Reference no.: 4269

The Rincon School (late 1860s–1933), also known as the Frederick Douglass School, was the first public school for African American students in San Antonio, Texas, United States. The school was founded on Rincon Street (now St. Mary's Street) as a private school, in 1871 it became a public school, and moved in 1915 to what is now 318 Martin Luther King Drive. It has a historical marker was erected 2010 by Texas Historical Commission (no. 4269) at 204 Augusta Street near the San Antonio River Walk. It was also called the Rincon Street Public Colored School, the Brackenridge Colored School, and Frederick Douglass Colored High School.

== History ==
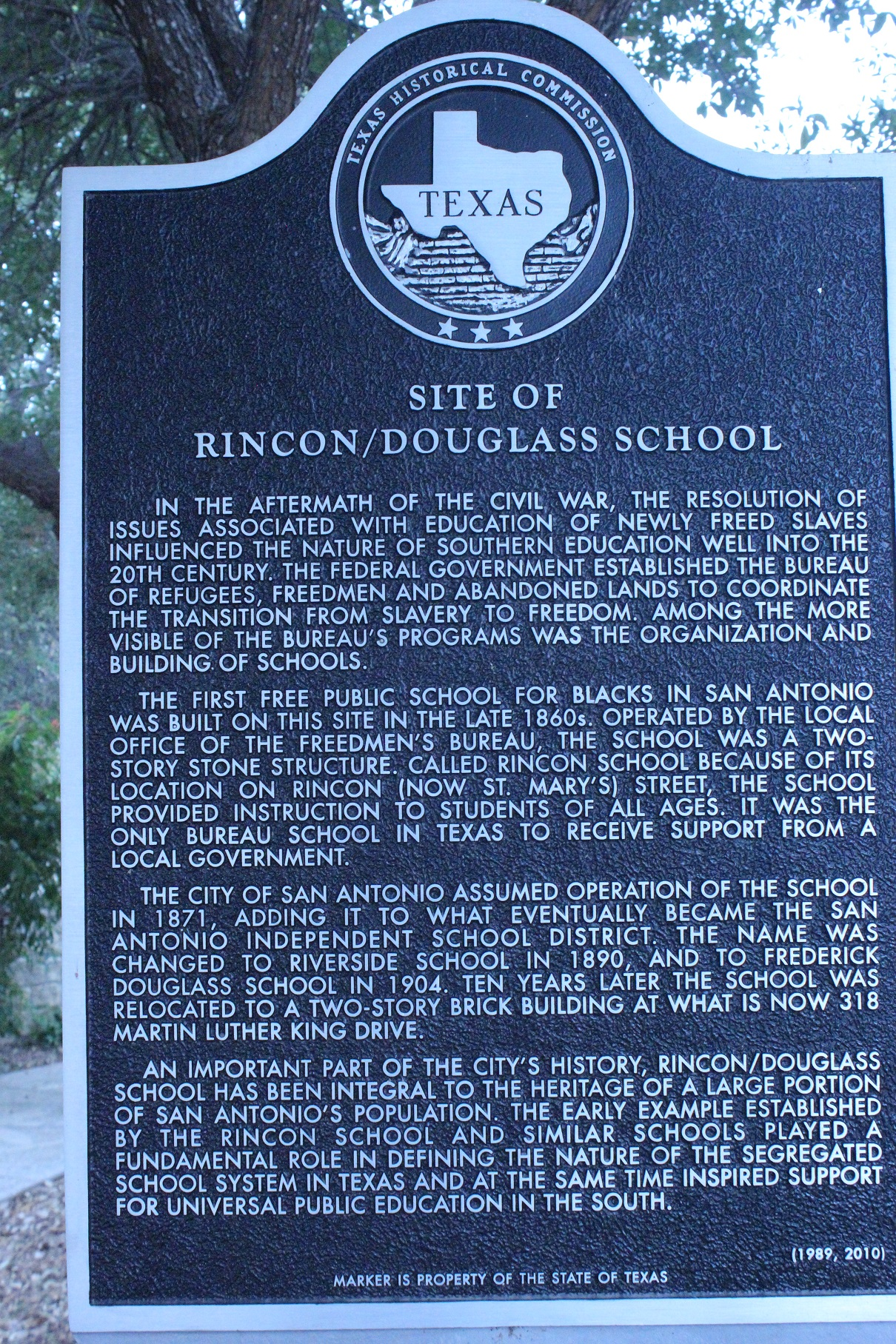
Historical marker

The Rincon School opened in the late 1860s as a two-story stone building on Rincon Street (now St. Mary's Street) near the San Antonio River Walk, and was operated by the Freedmen's Bureau. It was the first public high school for African American students in the city. The site had been a former Confederate States Army tanner and sawmill, and was purchased in 1868 by the Freedmen's Bureau. In 1871, the city assumed operation of the school, in what is now the San Antonio Independent School District.

The Rincon School taught children in the daytime (at the elementary school level), and adults at nighttime, and they quickly outgrew the building. By 1888, the school was renting additional space at the St. James AME Church.

In 1889, philanthropist George Washington Brackenridge donated money to expand the curriculum at the Rincon School and they began to offer vocational high school courses. In 1915, the school moved to a larger school building on the Eastside of San Antonio, at 318 Martin Luther King Drive in a building designed by Leo Dielmann.

== Closure and later building usage ==
The Rincon School remained a high school until June 1933, and afterwards the campus at 318 Martin Luther King Drive became Douglass Academy, a middle school active until 1970. In 1954, schools in San Antonio began the process of desegregation after court order. The former campus at 318 Martin Luther King Drive, was converted into a non-segregated elementary school for grades 3-5, now called Frederick Douglass Elementary School.

== See also ==
- List of Recorded Texas Historic Landmarks (Anderson-Callahan)
