= Sofía Stefani Espinoza Álvarez =

Mexican author and political analyst

- Born: May 5, 1989 (age 37); Melchor Múzquiz, Coahuila, Mexico
- Education: Sul Ross State University; University of León; University of Guanajuato
- Occupations: Author researcher criminologist political analyst
- Writing career
- Notable works: Immigration and the Law; Hispanics in the U.S. Criminal Justice System
- Website: sofiastefani.com

Sofía Stefani Espinoza Álvarez (born 5 May 1989), also known as Sofía Stefani, is a Mexican author, activist, and political analyst. Her academic work examines the relationship between migration, inequality, and systems of justice, addressing the institutional mechanisms of social control associated with immigration and criminal justice policies.

== Biography ==
Espinoza Álvarez was born on 5 May 1989 in Múzquiz, a municipality in the Región Carbonífera of Coahuila. In 2011 she earned a bachelor's degree in Criminal Justice from Sul Ross State University in Texas, where she conducted early research on the sociological dimensions of the U.S. criminal justice system. She subsequently studied law at Universidad de León. In 2018, she began graduate studies in Political Analysis at the University of Guanajuato.

== Academic work ==
Since 2011 Espinoza Álvarez has participated in a research and publication program designed to provide evidence-based analysis on issues affecting Latina and Latino populations in the United States. She has examined racial, gender, and socioeconomic inequalities in the criminal justice systems of the United States and Mexico, in relation to national and international frameworks of social control, including crime control, drug enforcement, anti-immigrant policy, and counter-terrorism measures.

In 2023 Academic Influence placed Espinoza Álvarez at No. 12 on its ranking "Influential Women in Criminal Justice From the Last 10 Years."

== Publications ==
Espinoza Álvarez is the author of four books and academic articles published in specialized journals. Her articles include "Capital Punishment on Trial: Who Lives, Who Dies, Who Decides—A Question of Justice?" (2014) and "Neoliberalism, Criminal Justice, and Latinos: The Contours of Neoliberal Economic Thought and Policy on Criminalization" (2016).

NEXO, the institutional journal of the Julian Samora Research Institute at Michigan State University, and Midwest Book Review each reviewed her books, describing them as suited for academic libraries and professional collections. Immigration and the Law received further attention in two peer-reviewed journals: Western Historical Quarterly, published by Oxford University Press, described it as bringing together historical, legal, political, and economic perspectives on contemporary migration, while the Journal of Borderlands Studies characterized it as a critical account of the structural racism and social control embedded in immigration law, policy, and enforcement. In 2022, BookAuthority ranked Hispanics in the U.S. Criminal Justice System first on its "20 Best Immigration Law Books of All Time" list.

=== Books ===
- Hispanics in the U.S. Criminal Justice System: Ethnicity, Ideology, and Social Control (2018). ISBN 978-0398092160
- Immigration and the Law: Race, Citizenship, and Social Control (2018). ISBN 978-0816537624
- Ethnicity and Criminal Justice in the Era of Mass Incarceration: A Critical Reader on the Latino Experience (2017). ISBN 978-0398091538
- Latino Police Officers in the United States: An Examination of Emerging Trends and Issues (2015). ISBN 978-0398081447

== Activism and advocacy ==
Since 2013, Espinoza Álvarez has worked through Empower Global on migrant-rights advocacy in Mexico and the United States.

Espinoza Álvarez has written for Univision, El Universal, and HuffPost, and has appeared as a guest analyst on radio and television, covering migration, criminal justice, ethnic disparities, human rights, public policy, diversity, representation, and social justice in Mexico and the United States.

=== Migrant rights and immigration policy ===
During the 2016 U.S. presidential election cycle, Espinoza Álvarez addressed immigration policy and the protections available to migrant communities ahead of a change in presidential administration. On 31 October 2016, she published an open letter to Democratic presidential candidate Hillary Clinton in HuffPost, calling for comprehensive immigration reform to be included in Clinton's platform.

Following the election, Espinoza Álvarez called for President Barack Obama to use his presidencial pardon power before leaving office as a means of protecting certain immigrants from deportation. She presented this position in a 16 November column for Univision addressing several groups of immigrants, including students, mothers, workers, "dreamers," and beneficiaries of the Deferred Action for Childhood Arrivals (DACA) program. The following day, Aristegui Noticias published an interview with her in she called on civil-society organizations and political actors to support the proposal.

On 17 November, Democratic Representatives Zoe Lofgren, Lucille Roybal-Allard, and Luis Gutiérrez formally asked Obama to use his pardon power to protect DACA recipients. On 24 November, organizations of children of immigrants promoted a similar petition, and the request was later reiterated by a group of 64 Democratic members of the House of Representatives. The White House rejected the proposal's viability, stating that a presidential pardon could not confer legal status on undocumented individuals and that this power belonged to Congress.

=== Woman´s Rights Advocacy ===
On 1 April 2016, Espinoza Álvarez created a petition calling for legislation against sexual harassment in public spaces, addressed to Mexico's Secretary of the Interior, a federal senator, and the president of Mexico's National Women's Institute (Inmujeres). She subsequently promoted a second petition proposing a mobile application for the prevention of and alert system for sexual harassment, addressed to the Secretary of the Interior and the director of Mexico City's Laboratory for the City.Both petitions were integrated into the movement associated with the hashtag #NoTeCalles.
