= Easy Gardener Products, Inc. =

American multinational corporation

Easy Gardener Products, Inc. is an American multinational corporation headquartered in Waco, Texas that manufactures and sells gardening products. European operations are managed in London.

== History ==
Easy Gardener was founded in 1983 by Dick Grandy and Joe Owens. WeedBlock was the company's first product. Since then the company has grown through acquisitions and the introduction of new products.

U.S. Home & Garden (known as Natural Earth Technologies before 1995), purchased Easy Gardener for $21 million in 1994. In 1996 it acquired Weatherly Consumer Products (which would become an Easy Gardener subsidiary), the parent company of the Jobe's and ROSS brands.

Easy Gardener separated from U.S. Home & Garden through a $19.2M sale to a management-led group in 2003. Weatherly Consumer Products was included in this acquisition, and as a part of that same deal, Easy Gardener was also required to take the product line produced by Ampro Industries, Inc. of Grand Rapids, Michigan, which U.S. Home & Garden had purchased in 1998. Shortly following this activity in 2004, U.S. Home & Garden would acquire Ionatron, Inc., renaming itself Ionatron, Inc. in the process. Ionatron, a company specializing in development and manufacture of high performance lasers, high voltage electronics, advanced optical systems, and integrated guided energy systems for defense, aerospace, industrial, and scientific applications, would change its name to Applied Energetics in 2008.

Easy Gardener acquired Phoenix Recycled Products in 2007 and began producing and selling tree rings, garden edging, mulch, stepping stones and other products made from recycled tires and other post-industrial rubber materials.

In 2006, H.I.G. Capital, a Miami-based private equity firm, purchased Easy Gardener for $58.79M.

Easy Gardener recently introduced sustainable and organic products to the lawn and garden market. These include Jobe's Organics fertilizer spikes and additions to the WeedBlock landscape fabric line using recycled, corn-based and biodegradable materials.

== Activities ==
Easy Gardener Products, Inc. manufactures branded gardening products, specialty fertilizers, and recycled rubber products for consumer markets. The company also sells products for commercial landscapers. Easy Gardener manufactures and distributes over 200 products through lawn and garden retailers in the United States, Canada, and the UK. Easy Gardener's brands include WeedBlock and Landmaster weed control fabrics, Jobe's fertilizer spikes and tree care products, and ROSS root feeder and fertilizers. The company also produces shade fabrics, landscape edging, sun screen fabrics, netting, and plastic fencing.

Easy Gardener's fertilizer production facility is in Paris, Kentucky and the recycled rubber products plant is in Batesburg, South Carolina. The company employs over 250 people in North America and Europe.

== Brands ==
- Easy Gardener
- WeedBlock
- Jobe's
- ROSS
- Emerald Edge
- Fiber Edge
- Ultra-Edge
- Landmaster
