= Timeline of McAllen, Texas =

The following is a timeline of the history of the city of McAllen, Texas, USA.

== 20th century ==
- 1904 - West McAllen townsite established.
- 1905 - St. Louis, Brownsville and Mexico Railroad begins operating.
- 1907 - East McAllen development begins.
- 1909
  - McAllen Monitor newspaper begins publication.
  - Methodist Church built.
  - High school established.
- 1910 - Population: 150.
- 1911
  - Town of McAllen incorporated in Hidalgo County.
  - Frank W. Crow becomes mayor.
- 1916 - "12,000 soldiers...stationed in McAllen...during the period of border disturbances."
- 1918 - Casa de Palmas hotel built.
- 1920 - Population: 5,331.
- 1924 - Chamber of Commerce formed.
- 1925 - McAllen Municipal Hospital built.
- 1926 - Reynosa-McAllen international bridge built.
- 1927 - Southern Pacific Railroad Depot opens.
- 1928 - First United Methodist Church built.
- 1933
  - Reynosa-McAllen bridge rebuilt.
  - Bandstand erected in Archer Park.
- 1934 - Collapse of Reynosa-McAllen bridge.
- 1935
  - Post Office built.
  - Quinta Mazatlan (residence) construction begins.
- 1936 - Deepwater Port of Brownsville opens in vicinity of McAllen.
- 1940 - Queen Theater in business.
- 1944 - McAllen Public Library established.
- 1946 - "Civic center" built.
- 1947 - KRIO (AM) radio begins broadcasting.
- 1948
  - Cine El Rey (cinema) in business.
  - Discos Falcón (recording studio) in business.
- 1949 - Synagogue built.
- 1950 - Population: 20,067.
- 1952 - Miller Airport opens.
- 1967 - September: Hurricane Beulah occurs.
- 1970 - Foreign trade zone established.
- 1976 - La Plaza Mall in business.
- 1977 - Rosie Jimenez, also known as Rosaura Jimenez, is the first woman known to have died due to an illegal abortion after the Hyde Amendment was passed. Jimenez died at age 27 in 1977 from an illegal abortion in McAllen, Texas.
- 1980 - Population: 66,281.
- 1987 - Phyllis Griggs was elected as the city's first female commissioner in 1987, and served until 2001.
- 1989 - September 21: "Alton school bus accident."
- 1992 - Las Tiendas Shopping Mall in business.
- 1993
  - McAllen Miller International Airport terminal built.
  - South Texas Community College opens.
- 1995 - City Hall rebuilt.
- 1997
  - City website online.
  - Rubén Hinojosa becomes U.S. representative for Texas's 15th congressional district.
- 1998 - Texas State Bank building constructed.
- 1999 - "Futuro McAllen" civic group formed.
- 2000
  - Green jay designated official city bird.
  - Population: 106,414.

== 21st century ==
- 2001
  - Intermodal Transit Terminal (bus station) opens.
  - City enacts ordinance for historic preservation.
- 2004
  - City centennial observed.
  - Boys and Girls Club built.
- 2005 - Palm View Golf Course in business.
- 2006 - World Birding Center Quinta Mazatlan park opens.
- 2007
  - McAllen Convention Center opens.
  - Veterans War Memorial of Texas dedicated.
- 2008
  - July: Hurricane Dolly occurs.
  - McAllen Heritage Center opens.
- 2009 - Anzalduas International Bridge opens.
- 2010 - Population: 129,877.
- 2011 - Public library building opens in former Walmart store.
- 2013 - James E. Darling becomes mayor.
- 2014 - Ursula (detention center) for immigrants begins operating.
- 2017
  - Vicente Gonzalez becomes U.S. representative for Texas's 15th congressional district.
  - President Donald Trump holds a briefing at the Border Patrol station during the United States federal government shutdown of 2018–2019 over the Mexico–United States barrier.

== See also ==
- McAllen history
- List of mayors of McAllen, Texas
- National Register of Historic Places listings in Hidalgo County, Texas
- Timelines of other cities in the South Texas area of Texas: Brownsville, Corpus Christi, Laredo, San Antonio
- Reynosa, Mexico history

== Bibliography ==
- "McAllen". Texas State Gazetteer and Business Directory. Detroit: R. L. Polk & Co. 1914.
- Helen Simons; Cathryn A. Hoyt, eds. (1996). "Laredo and the Rio Grande Valley: McAllen". Guide to Hispanic Texas (Abridged ed.). University of Texas Press. pp. 95+. ISBN 978-0-292-77709-5.
- Paul T. Hellmann (2006). "Texas: McAllen". Historical Gazetteer of the United States. Taylor & Francis. pp. 1069+. ISBN 1-135-94859-3.
- Foresight McAllen: McAllen Comprehensive Plan (PDF), City of McAllen, 2007
