= Hucks =

Hucks may refer to:

- Hucks Gibbs, 1st Baron Aldenham (1819–1907), British banker, businessman and politician
- Bentfield Hucks (1884–1918), English aviation pioneer, inventor of the Hucks starter
- George Hucks (born 1968), Australian wheelchair rugby player
- William Hucks (1672–1740), Member of Parliament for Wallingford (UK Parliament constituency) from 1715 to 1734

== See also ==
- Hucks starter, a machine for starting small aircraft engines
- Huks, members of the Hukbalahap, a communist guerrilla movement in the Philippines in the 1940s
