= Labatt Food Service =

Food service distributor

- Company type: Privately Held
- Founded: 1910
- Area served: Southern United States
- Services: Food Service, Food-Away-From-Home
- Revenue: ▲$1.3 billion (2017)
- Number of employees: 2,500+
- Website: www.labattfood.com

Labatt Food Service is a third generation family owned food service distributor involved in marketing and distributing food products to regional chain restaurants, independent operators, schools, quick service chains, healthcare facilities and military bases. Labatt delivers to Food away from home customers in five states in the southern United States. The company is headquartered in San Antonio, Texas.

Labatt Food Service is among the top 10 food service distributors in the United States and has over $1 billion in sales every year. Labatt has 5 distribution centers and 9 offices and delivery hubs that occupy 1.4 million square feet of warehouse space across Texas and New Mexico. Labatt has over 1,500 employees.

The company was founded in 1910 by T.W. Labatt as the Collins Company. In 1940 T.W. Labatt opened the Labatt Wholesale Grocery Company with his two sons. HemisFair named the company the authorized distributor for the 1968 HemisFair, prompting the creation of Labatt Institutional Supply Company, known today as Labatt Food Service. In 1980 the company had $8 million in annual sales. Labatt Food Service introduced the use of Voice Technology in warehouse selection in 2002 to increase operational efficiencies. In 2013 the company had over $1 billion in annual sales. Labatt developed their own line of Native American Beef in New Mexico in 2013.

== History ==
1910 – Company founded as Collins Company

1940 – Opened as Labatt Wholesale Grocery Company

1968 – Labatt named the authorized distributor for the Hemisfair

1980 – The company hits $8 million in annual sales

1984 – Distribution changed focus to exclusively food-away-from-home operators

1989 – Labatt’s second warehouse in Dallas is opened

2002 – Introduction of Voice Technology in warehouse operations

2005 – Labatt’s third warehouse in Lubbock is opened

2006 – Labatt received San Antonio Ethics in Business Award

2007 – Labatt received IFMA Excellence in Distribution Award

2007 – Labatt’s fourth warehouse in Houston is opened

2009 – Labatt acquired Zanios Foods in Albuquerque, NM

2011-2013 – Received recognition of Superior Performance in Food Safety by ASI Food Safety Consultants

2013 – Labatt hit over $1 billion in annual sales

2013 – Labatt developed Native American Beef

== Direct Source Meats ==
Direct Source Meats is a United States Department of Agriculture-inspected facility that further processes beef, chicken and pork for retail and foodservice markets. DSM was opened in 2002, after Labatt Food Service purchased the plant, located in San Antonio, Texas, from Swift-ConAgra Signature Meats. DSM is a 30,000 square foot USDA inspected facility. They employ 80 full-time production employees and process an average of 235,000 lbs per week. The plant was renovated in 2005 and then again in 2014.
