= Hillcrest, Corpus Christi =

Hillcrest, Corpus Christi is an African-American neighborhood in Corpus Christi, Texas. African Americans have made considerable contributions to the history and development of the Hillcrest community.

== History ==
Today much of the Hillcrest area of Corpus Christi is mostly a predominantly Black and Hispanic neighborhood.
