= Corpus Christi Public Libraries =

Municipal library system in Texas, US

Coordinates: 27.7931°N 97.3991°W

The Corpus Christi Public Libraries serve as the municipal library system of the city of Corpus Christi, Texas, US.

== Overview ==
The Corpus Christi Public Libraries serve library patrons through the La Retama Central Library and five branch Libraries. The library collection includes over 375,400 items in a variety of formats, including books, audio compact discs, books-on-CD, downloadable audio books, DVDs, videocassettes, audiocassettes, large print books, electronic books, and over 200 magazine and newspaper subscriptions. Library patrons can also access a large suite of electronic databases from the TexShare consortium.

The La Retama Central Library is the designated Major Resource Center for the South Texas Library System.

== Branches ==
- Dr. Clotilde P. Garcia Public Library
- Ben F. McDonald Public Library
- Janet F. Harte Public Library
- Anita & W.T. Neyland Public Library (formerly Parkdale Branch Library)
- Owen R. Hopkins Public Library
