= Timeline of Laredo, Texas =

The following is a timeline of the history of the city of Laredo, Texas, USA.

== 18th-19th centuries ==
- 1755 - May 15: Villa de Laredo founded by Tomás Sánchez and others in Spanish colonial Nuevo Santander, Viceroyalty of New Spain.
- 1760 - Chapel built.
- 1767 - San Agustin Church founded.
- 1790 - Population: 708.
- 1821 - Laredo becomes part of independent Mexican Empire.
- 1840 - Laredo becomes capital of the Mexican insurgent Republic of the Rio Grande during the Mexican Federalist War.
- 1846 - Laredo taken by U.S. Texas Rangers during the Mexican–American War.
- 1847 - U.S. forces occupy town.
- 1848
  - Laredo becomes part of the U.S. per Treaty of Guadalupe Hidalgo at end of Mexican–American War.
  - Webb County, Texas created.
- 1849 - U.S. military Camp Crawford established.
- 1852 - Laredo "chartered as a Texas city."
- 1860 - Population: 1,256.
- 1872 - San Agustin Church rebuilt.
- 1880
  - Corpus Christi-Laredo railway begins operating.
  - Population: 3,521.
- 1881
  - Mexico-Laredo railway begins operating.
  - St. Peter's neighborhood development begins.
  - City plan for Laredo and Nuevo Laredo, "'Plano de los Dos Laredos' created by E.R. Laroche."
- 1882
  - Laredo Seminary and city water works established.
  - County Courthouse built.
- 1883 - Daily Laredo Times newspaper begins publication.
- 1888 - Laredo Improvement Company formed.
- 1889
  - Street railway begins operating.
  - "Foot and wagon bridge built across the Rio Grande" at Convent Avenue.
- 1890 - Population: 11,319.
- 1898 - Onion farming begins (approximate date).
- 1900 - Population: 13,429.

== 20th century ==
- 1904 - Laredo Academy established.
- 1907 - Laredo United States Post Office, Court House and Custom House built.
- 1908 - Discovery of natural gas in vicinity of Laredo.
- 1909 - Webb County Courthouse built.
- 1910 - Population: 14,855.
- 1911 - Liga Femenil Mexicanista (women's group) founded in Laredo.
- 1915 - Laredo public library active (approximate date).
- 1920
  - Texas Mexican Railway International Bridge opened.
  - Population: 22,710.
- 1922
  - International Bridge opens.
  - Azteca Theater opens.
- 1937 - Foundry Workers' Union of Laredo formed.
- 1938 - KPAB radio begins broadcasting.
- 1946 - Fort McIntosh, Texas de-activated.
- 1947 - Laredo Junior College established.
- 1950 - Population: 51,910.
- 1954 - Flood.
- 1956 - KGNS-TV (television) begins broadcasting.
- 1969 - Texas A&M International University established.
- 1970
  - River Drive Mall in business.
  - Population: 69,678.
- 1977 - Mall del Norte in business.
- 1978 - Aldo Tatangelo becomes mayor.
- 1980
  - Webb County Heritage Foundation established.
  - Population: 91,449.
- 1990
  - Saul N. Ramirez, Jr. becomes mayor.
  - Population: 122,899.
- 1993
  - Laredo Community College active.
  - Cinemark Movies 12 (cinema) in business.
- 1998 - Betty Flores becomes mayor.
- 2000
  - Roman Catholic Diocese of Laredo established.
  - Population: 176,576.

== 21st century ==
- 2001 - City website online (approximate date).
- 2005 - Henry Cuellar becomes U.S. representative for Texas's 28th congressional district.
- 2006 - Raul G. Salinas becomes mayor.
- 2007 - Cinemark Mall Del Norte (cinema) in business.
- 2008 - Rio Grande Detention Center opens, housing up to 1900 federal prisoners for the U.S. government
- 2010 - Population: 236,091.
- 2014 - Pete Saenz becomes mayor.

== See also ==
- Laredo, Texas history (es)
- List of mayors of Laredo, Texas
- National Register of Historic Places listings in Webb County, Texas
- Nuevo Laredo, Mexico history (es)
- Timelines of other cities in the South Texas area of Texas: Brownsville, Corpus Christi, McAllen, San Antonio

== Bibliography ==
- "Laredo". Texas State Gazetteer and Business Directory. Detroit: R.L. Polk & Co. 1890 – via Internet Archive.
- "Laredo". A Twentieth Century History of Southwest Texas. Chicago: Lewis Publishing Company. 1907.
- "Laredo" . Encyclopædia Britannica. Vol. 16 (11th ed.). 1910. p. 215.
- Federal Writers' Project (1940), "Laredo", Texas: A Guide to the Lone Star State, American Guide Series, New York: Hastings House, hdl:2027/mdp.39015002677667 – via HathiTrust
- Stanley Cooper Green, Laredo, 1755–1920 (Laredo: Nuevo Santander Museum Complex, 1981)
- Gilberto Miguel Hinojosa, A Borderlands Town in Transition: Laredo, 1755–1870 (College Station: Texas A&M University Press, 1983)
- Jerry Don Thompson, Laredo: A Pictorial History (Norfolk: Donning, 1986)
- Helen Simons; Cathryn A. Hoyt, eds. (1996). "Laredo and the Rio Grande Valley". A Guide to Hispanic Texas (Abridged ed.). University of Texas Press. pp. 69–120. ISBN 978-0-292-77709-5.
- Betty Dooley Awbrey; Stuart Awbrey (2013). "Laredo". Why Stop?: A Guide to Texas Roadside Historical Markers (6th ed.). Taylor Trade Publishing. p. 267+. ISBN 978-1-58979-790-1.
