= Huck (surname) =

As a surname, Huck may refer to:

- Anton Huck (1881–1951), Canadian merchant and politician
- Bill Huck (born 1954), German cyclist, world sprint champion in 1989 and 1990
- Daniel Huck (1948–2026), French jazz reedist and singer
- Fran Huck (born 1945), Canadian retired hockey player
- Jean-Noël Huck (born 1948), French retired football player and manager
- Karsten Huck (born 1945), German equestrian and Olympic medalist
- Lloyd Huck (1922–2012), American business executive and philanthropist
- Luciano Huck (born 1971), Brazilian television personality
- Marco Huck (born 1984), German boxer currently holder of the WBO Cruiserweight title
- Paul Huck (born 1940), American lawyer and judge
- Richard Huck, US Marine Corps major general
- Violette Huck (born 1988), French tennis player
- Willie Huck (born 1979), French footballer, son of Jean-Noël Huck
- Winnifred Sprague Mason Huck (1882–1936), journalist and U.S. Congresswoman

== See also ==
- Huck (disambiguation)
- Huck (nickname)
- Huq, surname
