= Tejano Religion and Ethnicity, San Antonio, 1821–1860 =

Tejano Religion and Ethnicity, San Antonio, 1821–1860 is a non-fiction book by Timothy Matovina, published by the University of Texas Press in 1995.

The book chronicles how San Antonio culturally changed when it became Anglo-dominant after formerly being a part of Mexico. According to Gilberto M. Hinojosa of University of the Incarnate Word, the book establishes how the historiography of Mexican Americans and much of the previous Spanish colonization are connected.

== Content ==
The book has five chapters.

In addition to the text, there are a bibliography and notes sections present. The latter takes up a combined 62 pages, while the primary content of the book takes up 93 pages.

== Reception ==
Patrick Foley of Catholic Southwest praised the book for being "balanced, well-written, and thoroughly researched".

Robert E. Wright of the Oblate School of Theology praised the "very careful and nuanced" way of analyzing various aspects.
