= Rise of the Mexican American Middle Class =

1991 book by Richard A. Garcia

Rise of the Mexican American Middle Class: San Antonio, 1929–1941 is a non-fiction book by Richard A. Garcia, published in 1991 by the Texas A&M University Press.

Garcia chose the city as the focus of his book as it was a place where Mexican and American influences and contacts, along with Texas-specific versions of those. Additionally Garcia felt that the best way to measure how aspects changed over time was to engage in a "a community study". Rodolfo Rosales stated that the book characterizes the city "as a colonial town" which has poor treatment of "natives, i.e., the Mexican Americans". The work also argues that San Antonio, in that time period, was the, in the words of Richard Griswold del Castillo of San Diego State University, "the most important place" where Mexican Americans held onto Mexican customs and committed themselves as American citizens.

== Background ==
It is based on a PhD thesis.

Sources used include La Prensa, other secondary sourcing, oral interviews, and documents in private collections.

== Contents ==
The book has three parts. There is a bibliography, and index, and sections with notes.

The book does not include maps, nor does it include photographs.

== Reception ==
Francesco Cordasco of Montclair State College stated that the author should be "commended" for making this work.

Rosales stated that the work "is very informative."
