= Timeline of Brownsville, Texas =

The following is a timeline of the history of the city of Brownsville, Texas, USA.

== 18th-19th centuries ==
- 1771 - José Salvador de la Garza settles in area per Espíritu Santo land grant.
- 1846
  - March: Fort Taylor established by Zachary Taylor.
  - May 8: Battle of Palo Alto.
- 1848 - Brownsville founded by Charles Stillman.
- 1849
  - Travellers of the California Gold Rush pass through town.
  - Stillman house built.
  - Brownsville Lyceum founded.
- 1850
  - Market Square built.
  - Sentinel newspaper begins publication.
  - Population: 2,734.
- 1853 - "Police force" established.
- 1859
  - First Cortina War.
  - Immaculate Conception Church built.
- 1863 - November 2–6: Battle of Brownsville; Union wins.
- 1865
  - May 12–13: Battle of Palmito Ranch fought near Brownsville; Confederates win.
  - Saint Joseph Academy established.
- 1867 - Hurricane.
- 1870
  - Point Isabel-Brownsville railway built.
  - Population: 4,905.
- 1874 - Roman Catholic apostolic vicariate of Brownsville established.
- 1875 - Porfirio Díaz plots Mexican coup from his temporary base in Brownsville.
- 1877 - Alonso house built.
- 1878 - Sabas Cavazos Cemetery established.
- 1883 - Cameron County Courthouse built.
- 1890 - Population: 6,134.
- 1892 - Daily Herald newspaper begins publication.
- 1900 - Population: 6,305.

== 20th century ==
- 1903 - St. Louis, Brownsville and Mexico Railway begins operating.
- 1906 - August: Brownsville Affair (racial unrest).
- 1907 - Snakeville in business.
- 1910
  - Brownsville & Matamoros International Bridge opens.
  - Dittmann Theater (cinema) built.
  - Population: 10,517.
- 1913 - County Jail built.
- 1914 - New Cameron County Courthouse built.
- 1926 - Junior College of the Lower Rio Grande Valley established.
- 1927 - KGFI radio begins broadcasting.
- 1930 - Population: 22,021.
- 1934 - El Heraldo de Brownsville newspaper begins publication.
- 1936 - Port of Brownsville opens.
- 1938 - Matamoros-Brownsville Charro Days Festival begins.
- 1945 - U.S. Army Fort Brown decommissioned.
- 1946 - Teatro Victoria in business.
- 1949 - Charro Drive-In cinema and Majestic Theatre in business.
- 1950
  - Texas Southmost College active.
  - Population: 35,086.
- 1960
  - Stillman House Museum opens.
  - Population: 48,040.
- 1965 - Roman Catholic Diocese of Brownsville established.
- 1970 - Population: 52,522.
- 1971 - Gladys Porter Zoo established.
- 1978 - Palo Alto Battlefield National Historic Site established. (Palo Alto Battlefield National Historical Park since 2009.)
- 1979 - Brownsville Urban System (transport) established.
- 1980 - Population: 84,997.
- 1990 - Population: 98,962.
- 1991
  - University of Texas at Brownsville active.
  - Pat Ahumada becomes mayor.
- 1997 - City website online (approximate date).
- 1999 - Blanca Vela becomes mayor.
- 2000 - Population: 139,722.

== 21st century ==
- 2001 - El Nuevo Heraldo newspaper in publication.
- 2007 - Pat Ahumada becomes mayor again.
- 2010 - Population: 175,023.
- 2013 - Filemon Vela, Jr. becomes U.S. representative for Texas's 34th congressional district.
- 2018 - Trey Mendez elected mayor.
- 2023 - John Cowen Jr. elected mayor.

== See also ==
- Brownsville, Texas history
- List of mayors of Brownsville, Texas
- Matamoros, Mexico history
- National Register of Historic Places listings in Cameron County, Texas
- Timelines of other cities in the South Texas area of Texas: Corpus Christi, Laredo, McAllen, San Antonio

== Bibliography ==
- "Brownsville". Texas State Gazetteer and Business Directory. Detroit: R.L. Polk & Co. 1890 – via Internet Archive.
- W. H. Chatfield, The Twin Cities of the Border and the Country of the Lower Rio Grande (New Orleans: Brandao, 1893)
- "Brownsville" . Encyclopædia Britannica. Vol. 4 (11th ed.). 1910. p. 675.
- Federal Writers' Project (1940), "Brownsville", Texas: A Guide to the Lone Star State, American Guide Series, New York: Hastings House, hdl:2027/mdp.39015002677667 – via HathiTrust + chronology
- Betty Bay. Historic Brownsville: Original Townsite Guide (Brownsville, Texas: Brownsville Historical Association, 1980)
- Robert B. Vezzetti and Ruby A. Wooldridge, Brownsville: A Pictorial History (Virginia Beach, Virginia: Donning, 1982)
- Milo Kearney, ed., Studies in Brownsville History (Pan American University at Brownsville, 1986)
- Milo Kearney and Anthony Knopp, Boom and Bust: The Historical Cycles of Matamoros and Brownsville (Austin: Eakin Press, 1991)
- Milo Kearney, ed., Still More Studies in Brownsville History (University of Texas at Brownsville, 1991)
- Helen Simons; Cathryn A. Hoyt, eds. (1996). "Laredo and the Rio Grande Valley: Brownsville". A Guide to Hispanic Texas (Abridged ed.). University of Texas Press. pp. 81+. ISBN 978-0-292-77709-5.
- Carl S. Chilton (2010). Historic Brownsville: an Illustrated History. San Antonio, Tx.: Historical Publishing Network. ISBN 978-1-935377-15-3.
- Betty Dooley Awbrey; Stuart Awbrey (2013). "Brownsville". Why Stop?: A Guide to Texas Roadside Historical Markers (6th ed.). Taylor Trade Publishing. p. 63+. ISBN 978-1-58979-790-1.
