= XEGH-AM =

Radio station in Río Bravo, Tamaulipas

- Rio Bravo, Tamaulipas; Mexico
- Broadcast area: Rio Grande Valley
- Frequency: 620 kHz
- Branding: La Lupe

Ownership
- Owner: Ernesto Montemayor Ibarra
- Operator: Radio United
- Sister stations: KURV; KBUC; XHCAO-FM; XHRYS-FM; XHAVO-FM; XHRR-FM;

History
- First air date: March 30, 1995 (concession)

Technical information
- Licensing authority: CRT
- Class: B
- Power: 1,000 watts day 250 watts night
- Repeater: XHCAO-FM 89.1 MHz (Ciudad Camargo)

Links
- Webcast: Listen live
- Website: lalupe891.com

XEGH-AM (620 kHz) is a Spanish-language radio station that serves the Rio Grande Valley, Texas (USA) / Reynosa, Tamaulipas (Mexico) border area.

The broadcast tower is around 10 miles from the United States border in Mexico.

== History ==
XEGH received its concession on March 30, 1995. The callsign had been assigned 25 years earlier, in August 1970, when the station was made available for bidding. Montemayor Ibarra initially owned the station for Grupo ACIR transmitting the format "Bonita" until 2004 when it changed to "Cumbia 620".

In 2005, XEGH became an AM simulcast of XHCAO-FM 89.1.
