= McAllen, Texas =

City in Texas, United States

- City
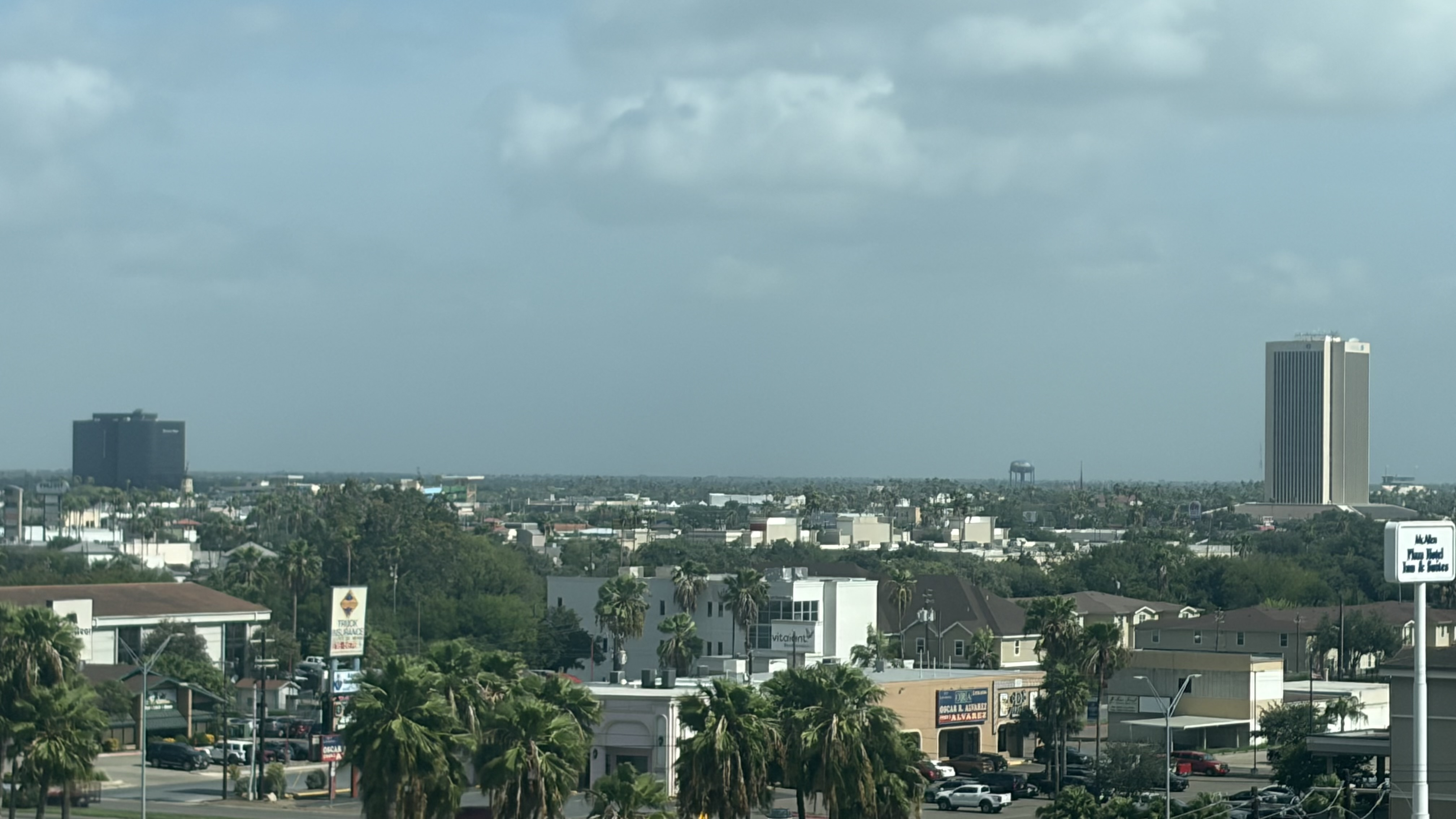
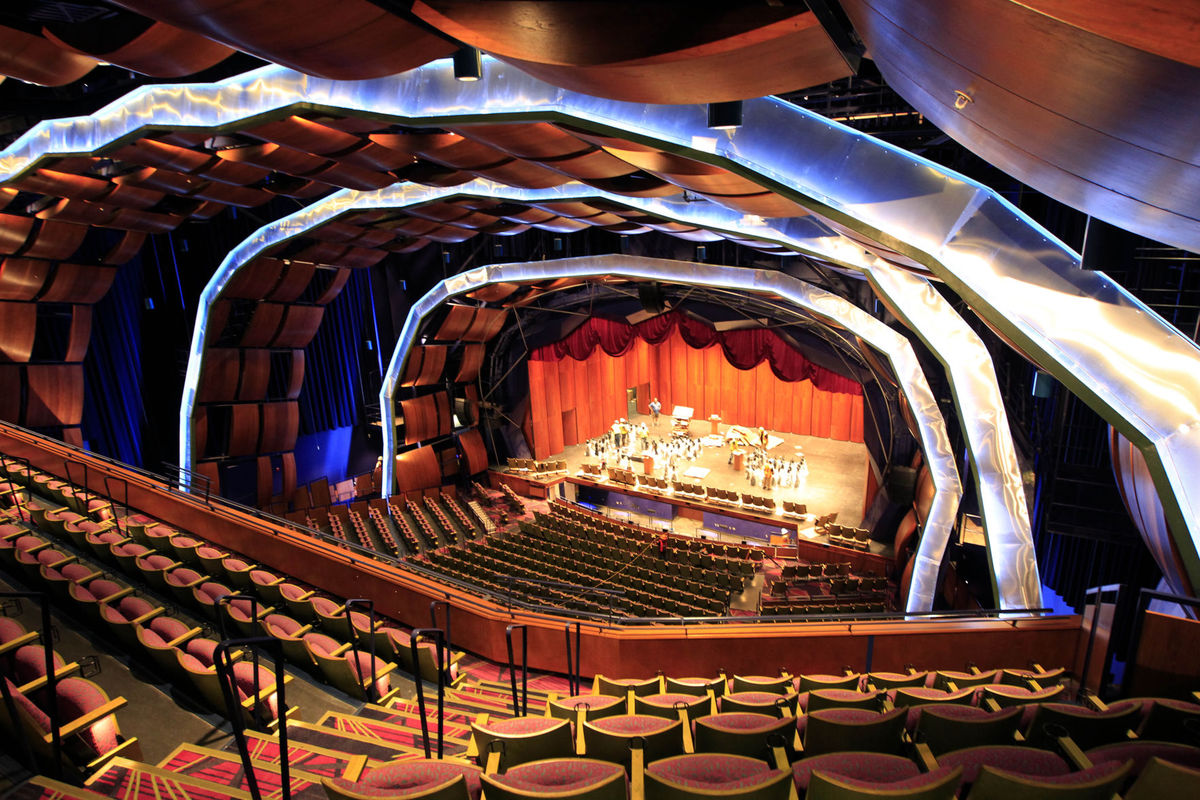
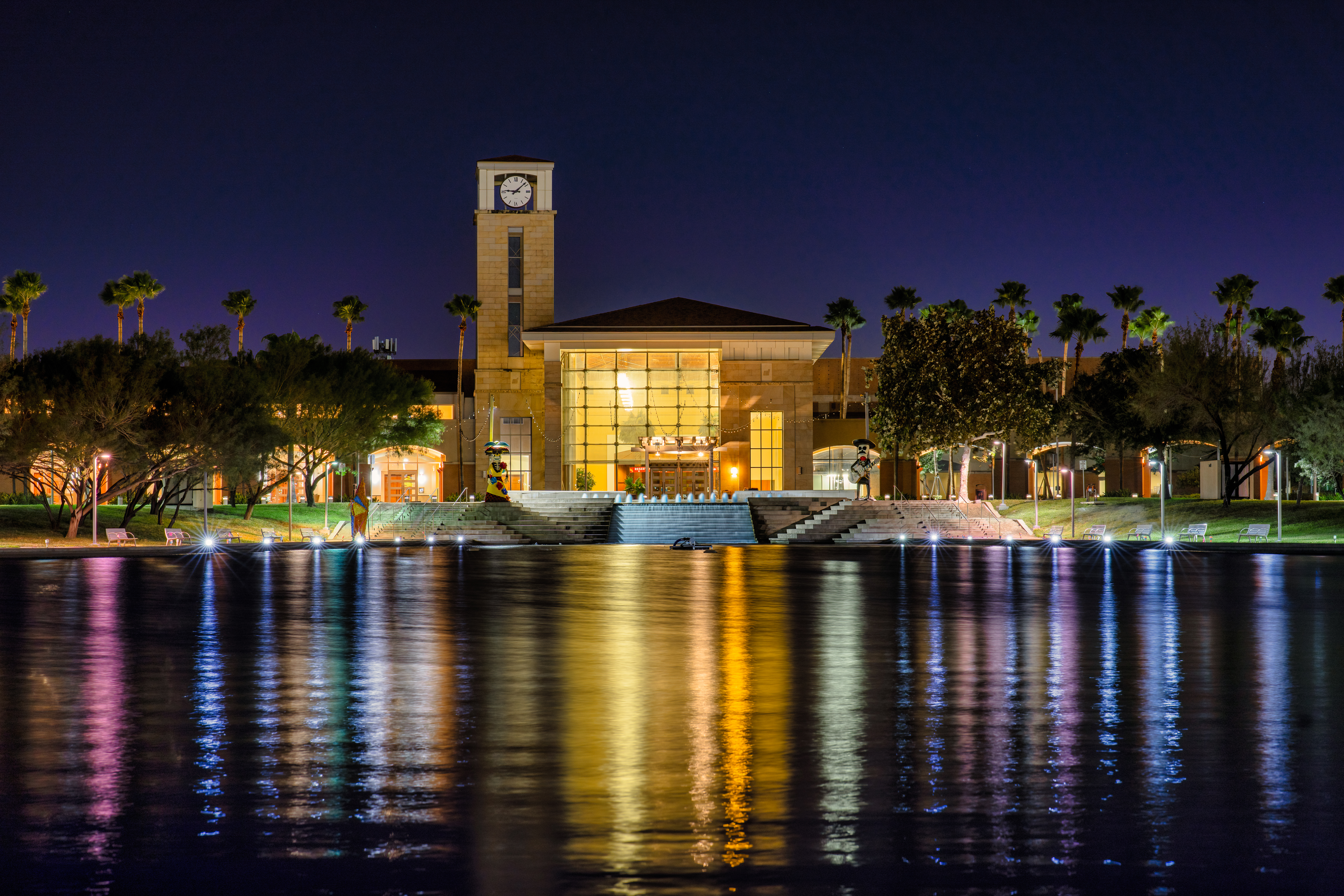
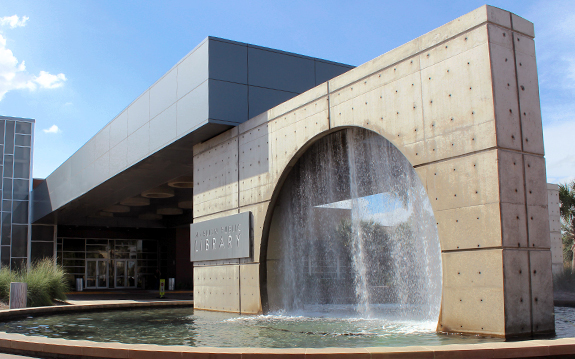
- Images, from top down, left to right: Skyline of McAllen; Interior of the Quinta Mazatlan; McAllen Convention Center at night; McAllen Performing Arts Center; Entrance to McAllen Public Library

- Seal
- Nickname: "The City of Palms"
- Location within Hidalgo County
- Interactive map of McAllen, Texas
- Location within Texas Location within the United States
- Coordinates: 26°12′59″N 98°14′11″W
- Country: United States
- State: Texas
- County: Hidalgo
- Founded: December 5, 1904
- Incorporated: February 20, 1911
- Named for: John McAllen

Government
  - Type: Council-Manager
  - City Council: Mayor Javier Villalobos; Tony Aguirre (District 1); Joaquin J. Zamora (District 2); Julian Omar Quintanilla (District 3); Rodolfo "Rudy" Castillo (District 4); Victor Sebastian Haddad (District 5); Pepe Cabeza de Vaca (District 6)
  - City Manager: Roel "Roy" Rodriguez
  - Texas State Representative: Robert Guerra
  - Texas State Senator: Juan Hinojosa
  - U.S. Representative: Monica De La Cruz

Area
  - City: 62.73 sq mi (162.48 km^{2})
  - Land: 62.31 sq mi (161.37 km^{2})
  - Water: 0.43 sq mi (1.11 km^{2})
- Elevation: 121 ft (37 m)

Population (2020)
  - City: 142,210
  - Estimate (2025): 150,640
  - Rank: US: 186th TX: 23rd
  - Density: 2,320/sq mi (895.9/km^{2})
  - Urban: 779,553 (US: 56th)
  - Urban density: 2,390/sq mi (922.7/km^{2})
  - Metro: 921,549 (US: 64th)
- Demonym: Mcallenite
- Time zone: UTC–6 (Central (CST))
  - Summer (DST): UTC–5 (CDT)
- ZIP codes: 78501, 78502, 78503, 78504, 78505, 78539, 78557, 78572
- Area code: 956
- FIPS code: 48-45384
- GNIS feature ID: 1374829
- Website: mcallen.net

McAllen is a city in the U.S. state of Texas. It is located at the southern tip of the state in the Rio Grande Valley, on the Mexican border. The city limits extend south to the Rio Grande, across from the Mexican city of Reynosa. As of the 2025 census estimate, McAllen's population was 150,640, making it the most populous city in Hidalgo County, the second most populous city in the Rio Grande Valley, and the 23rd-most populous city in Texas. The city anchors the McAllen-Edinburg-Mission metropolitan area, the fifth largest metropolitan area in the state of Texas, with 921,549 residents as of 2025. The binational Reynosa–McAllen metropolitan area counts a population of more than 1.5 million.

From its settlement in 1904, the area around McAllen was largely rural and agricultural in character, but the latter half of the 20th century had steady growth, which has continued in the 21st century in the metropolitan area. The introduction of the maquiladora economy and the North American Free Trade Association led to an increase in cross-border trading with Mexico.

== History ==
In 1904, the Hidalgo and San Miguel Extension (now the Sam Fordyce Branch) of the St. Louis, Brownsville and Mexico Railway reached the Santa Anita Ranch. John McAllen and his son James had donated land to the railroad to guarantee it would cross this area. On December 5, 1904, the McAllen Townsite Company was formed by Uriah Lott, Leonidas C. Hill Sr., John McAllen (1826-1913), James Ballí McAllen (1862-1916), and John J. Young. The new community, which was named for John McAllen, had the depot nearest the county seat, Hidalgo, 8 mi (13 km) to the south.

By 1911, 5,000 acres (2,000 ha) were under cultivation in East McAllen: commodity crops of cotton, alfalfa, broom corn, citrus fruits, grapes, and figs were raised. East McAllen had an estimated population of 1,000 that year, and West McAllen had ceased to exist. In 1911, the town applied for and was issued a charter of incorporation under the name McAllen. In 1916, 20,000 New York state troops were stationed at McAllen to help quell border disturbances related to the Mexican Civil War. The resulting economic boom increased the population from 1,200 in 1916 to 6,000 in 1920.

McAllen adopted a home rule charter in 1927. Canning factories, a winery, tortilla plants, wood-working plants, and some oil exploration increased the population to 9,074 by 1930. In 1936, Hiram Garner opened the Valley Distillery, Incorporated, which produced wines from citrus juices. The town was a petroleum and farm chemurgic center with a population of 11,877 in 1940, by which time it had adopted the nickname "The City of Palms". In 1941, a suspension bridge replaced the old bridge from Hidalgo to Reynosa in Tamaulipas; the new toll bridge was purchased by McAllen and was named the McAllen–Hidalgo–Reynosa International Bridge. Its construction resulted in increased tourist trade, making McAllen a winter resort and port of entry to Mexico.

The discovery of oil in the Reynosa area in 1947 attracted a large migration of people from the Mexican interior to jobs in the region. They both constituted a new tourist market and a cheap labor supply for McAllen. The sister cities were linked as a result of the increased traffic between them. The population of McAllen was 20,005 in 1950 and 32,728 in 1960. In 1954 the McAllen–Hidalgo–Reynosa International Bridge was the number-two port of entry into Mexico.

McAllen was an agricultural, oil, and tourist center in 1970, when the population reached 37,636. By the start of the 1970s, McAllen had a 200-bed hospital and a new air-conditioned high school, the first school in the nation featuring on-site power generated by natural gas-powered turbines. The tourism industry continued to expand as people traveled to the area from both Mexico and the northern United States. The population continued to grow steadily through the 1970s, and reached 66,281 by 1980. During the late 1980s, the McAllen Foreign Trade Zone was an important general-purpose foreign trade zone. At the time, McAllen's main industries were retail, tourism and farming, and each was in trouble. The devaluation of the Mexican peso in the 1980s put a damper on cross-border shopping; local tourism was down because of the recession. In 1983, a freeze took out much of the valley's citrus crop.

In the mid-1980s, fueled by trade and the growth of the maquiladora (in which components are shipped to Mexico from the United States, assembled, and shipped back as finished products), the economy began to improve in Hidalgo County. McAllen sits across the border from Reynosa, a large manufacturing center. After the peso devalued, Mexico was more successful in attracting companies to run their plants in Mexico, with support operations in Texas.

Border crossing is a daily event for many and is a key component in the local economy. The city became a focal point for concerns about the border during the United States federal government shutdown of 2018–2019 over the Mexico–United States barrier. President Donald Trump held a briefing with the border agents at the patrol station here in January 2019. Homeland Security Secretary Kirstjen Nielsen also visited the Border Patrol station in March 2019. In order to deal with overcrowded facilities in 2019 resulting from the arrival of Central American migrant caravans, immigration authorities were releasing a few hundred asylum seekers daily to private groups that assist them with basic needs and travel arrangements.

The mayor emphasized how safe and secure the city is when U.S military troops were mobilized in the city to help the Border Patrol. Portions of the razor wire coils considered unnecessary by the city were removed after troops had placed it at the border. The troops assisted by using military helicopters to carry border patrol agents to and from locations along the Mexico–United States border and by maintaining vehicles. The Marine Corps Commandant General Robert Neller expressed concerns about the impact of continuing border support on combat readiness for the troops.

== Geography ==
McAllen, located in southern Hidalgo County, is bordered to the southwest by Granjeno; to the west by Mission, Palmhurst, and Alton; to the north by Edinburg, the Hidalgo county seat; to the east by Pharr; and to the south by Hidalgo. The McAllen city limits extend to the southwest as far as the Rio Grande, directly north of Reynosa, Tamaulipas, in Mexico. The Anzalduas International Bridge crosses the Rio Grande at this point, 11 mi (18 km) southwest of downtown McAllen.

McAllen is 238 mi (383 km) south of San Antonio, 158 mi (254 km) southwest of Corpus Christi, 148 mi (238 km) southeast of Laredo, 60 mi (97 km) northwest of Brownsville, and 150 mi (240 km) northeast of Monterrey.

According to the United States Census Bureau, the city has a total area of 48.6 square miles (126.0 km^{2}), of which 0.3 sq mi (0.8 km^{2}), or 0.62%, is covered by water.

Although McAllen is named the "City of Palms", tropical vegetation is only locally dominant. Many thorny shrubs and deciduous trees occur in the area, such as the Rio Grande ash (Fraxinus berlandieriana), cedar elm (Ulmus crassifolia), and honey mesquite (Neltuma glandulosa).

=== Climate ===
McAllen, like much of South Texas, has a subtropical climate. Under the Köppen climate classification, the city features a hot semi-arid climate (BSh), featuring long, very hot and humid summers, and brief, warm winters. The city has two distinct seasons, a wet season from May to October and a dry season from November to April. The normal monthly mean temperature ranges from 62.8 °F (17.1 °C) in January to 89.3 °F (31.8 °C) in August. The warm season is extremely long, as average high temperatures from May through September are above 90 °F (32 °C) and average low temperatures are above 70 °F or 21.1 °C, with relatively high dew point values, resulting in higher relative humidity and heat index values. Heat indices consistently reach over 110 °F or 43.3 °C during these months. Winter temperatures in McAllen and surrounding Rio Grande Valley are some of the warmest in the contiguous United States outside of South Florida, and comparable to the Coachella and Imperial Valleys and Yuma Desert, but with warmer nighttime lows and higher dew points.

Average annual precipitation is 22.31 in (567 mm). Most precipitation occurs in the warm season, with the least precipitation distinctly occurring in the cooler winter. As September is the peak of the north Atlantic hurricane season and tropical storms and hurricanes occasionally drop copious amounts of rainfall on the region, this month tends by far to be the wettest, averaging 4.74 inches or 120 millimeters of rain. The driest month is February, with only 0.66 inches or 17 millimeters. Since 1941 the wettest month has been October 1958 with 12.04 inches or 305.8 millimeters; in contrast only 0.18 inches or 4.6 millimeters fell from April to July 1998, and only 1.47 inches or 37.3 millimeters from October 2010 to May 2011. The wettest day on record has been August 10, 1980 when 9.42 inches or 239.3 millimeters fell, the wettest calendar year 1966 with 37.17 inches or 944.1 millimeters, and the driest 1989 with only 8.64 inches or 219.5 millimeters.

Temperatures consistently rise above 100 °F or 37.8 °C from June through August, with exceptionally high humidity. The highest temperature ever recorded in McAllen was 111 °F or 43.9 °C, set on June 22, 2017 and May 9, 2024. The lowest temperature ever recorded in McAllen was 13 °F or −10.6 °C on January 12, 1962.

While usually a hot, humid, but relatively dry climate, McAllen has received unusual weather phenomena. In 2013, McAllen received a large hailstorm that destroyed many vehicles and buildings. The storm came suddenly, and many people were unprepared. Since 1941, it has snowed twice, once when the city received 1.7 inches or 0.043 meters on December 25, 2004,. and once in December 2017 when almost 3 inches or 0.076 meters was received. In February 2021, McAllen reached record low temperatures between 10 °F (−12.2 °C) and 20 °F (−6.7 °C) and lost power, heat, and water for a week due to Winter Storm Uri. In addition to these fluke weather events, McAllen is prone to tropical storms, hurricanes such as Hurricane Dolly (2008) and Hurricane Hanna (2020), and heatwaves.

Climate data for McAllen, Texas (McAllen Miller International Airport), 1991–2020 normals, (Note: Mean monthly maxima and minima (i.e. the highest and lowest temperature readings during an entire month or year) calculated based on data at said location from 1991 to 2020) extremes 1941–present
Month	Jan	Feb	Mar	Apr	May	Jun	Jul	Aug	Sep	Oct	Nov	Dec	Year
Record high °F (°C)	96 (36)	101 (38)	105 (41)	109 (43)	111 (44)	111 (44)	109 (43)	108 (42)	108 (42)	104 (40)	102 (39)	96 (36)	111 (44)
Mean maximum °F (°C)	87.4 (30.8)	92.4 (33.6)	96.1 (35.6)	98.8 (37.1)	99.5 (37.5)	102.0 (38.9)	103.2 (39.6)	103.8 (39.9)	101.0 (38.3)	96.8 (36.0)	91.7 (33.2)	87.5 (30.8)	105.5 (40.8)
Mean daily maximum °F (°C)	72.8 (22.7)	77.4 (25.2)	83.2 (28.4)	88.4 (31.3)	93.1 (33.9)	97.4 (36.3)	98.5 (36.9)	99.6 (37.6)	94.3 (34.6)	89.3 (31.8)	80.3 (26.8)	73.8 (23.2)	87.3 (30.7)
Daily mean °F (°C)	62.8 (17.1)	67.2 (19.6)	72.9 (22.7)	78.4 (25.8)	83.6 (28.7)	87.7 (30.9)	88.6 (31.4)	89.3 (31.8)	85.0 (29.4)	79.0 (26.1)	70.2 (21.2)	64.0 (17.8)	77.4 (25.2)
Mean daily minimum °F (°C)	52.7 (11.5)	56.9 (13.8)	62.7 (17.1)	68.4 (20.2)	74.1 (23.4)	78.0 (25.6)	78.8 (26.0)	78.9 (26.1)	75.6 (24.2)	68.7 (20.4)	60.1 (15.6)	54.1 (12.3)	67.4 (19.7)
Mean minimum °F (°C)	36.2 (2.3)	38.5 (3.6)	43.9 (6.6)	51.1 (10.6)	61.4 (16.3)	70.6 (21.4)	73.0 (22.8)	73.3 (22.9)	64.9 (18.3)	50.4 (10.2)	41.7 (5.4)	36.2 (2.3)	33.2 (0.7)
Record low °F (°C)	13 (−11)	19 (−7)	31 (−1)	40 (4)	50 (10)	59 (15)	65 (18)	64 (18)	50 (10)	41 (5)	30 (−1)	18 (−8)	13 (−11)
Average precipitation inches (mm)	0.84 (21)	0.66 (17)	1.15 (29)	1.35 (34)	1.98 (50)	2.73 (69)	2.10 (53)	1.75 (44)	4.74 (120)	2.04 (52)	1.19 (30)	1.10 (28)	22.31 (567)
Average precipitation days (≥ 0.01 in)	6.1	4.5	4.4	3.8	4.3	4.8	4.7	4.7	8.0	5.8	5.2	6.1	62.4
Source: NOAA

== Demographics ==
=== Racial and ethnic composition ===
McAllen, Texas – Racial and ethnic composition Note: the US Census treats Hispanic/Latino as an ethnic category. This table excludes Latinos from the racial categories and assigns them to a separate category. Hispanics/Latinos may be of any race.
Race / Ethnicity (NH = Non-Hispanic)	Pop 2000	Pop 2010	Pop 2020	% 2000	% 2010	% 2020
White alone (NH)	17,924	15,193	13,032	16.84%	11.70%	9.16%
Black or African American alone (NH)	487	833	894	0.46%	0.64%	0.63%
Native American or Alaska Native alone (NH)	112	120	141	0.11%	0.09%	0.10%
Asian alone (NH)	2,010	3,288	3,576	1.89%	2.53%	2.51%
Pacific Islander alone (NH)	15	17	21	0.01%	0.01%	0.01%
Some other race alone (NH)	42	88	409	0.04%	0.07%	0.29%
Mixed race or multiracial (NH)	397	428	887	0.37%	0.33%	0.62%
Hispanic or Latino (any race)	85,427	109,910	123,250	80.28%	84.630%	86.67%
Total	106,414	129,877	142,210	100.00%	100.00%	100.00%

=== 2020 census ===
As of the 2020 census, McAllen had a population of 142,210, 48,717 households, and 34,119 families residing in the city.

The median age was 35.4 years, 25.8% of residents were under the age of 18, and 14.3% were 65 years of age or older. For every 100 females, there were 93.2 males, and for every 100 females age 18 and over there were 89.7 males age 18 and over.

99.4% of residents lived in urban areas, while 0.6% lived in rural areas.

Of the 48,717 households in McAllen, 38.6% had children under the age of 18 living in them, 47.2% were married-couple households, 17.6% were households with a male householder and no spouse or partner present, and 29.8% were households with a female householder and no spouse or partner present. About 22.1% of all households consisted of individuals, and 8.4% had someone living alone who was 65 years of age or older.

There were 53,622 housing units, of which 9.1% were vacant. The homeowner vacancy rate was 1.3% and the rental vacancy rate was 8.6%.

Racial composition as of the 2020 census
Race	Number	Percent
White	48,974	34.4%
Black or African American	1,178	0.8%
American Indian and Alaska Native	1,114	0.8%
Asian	3,688	2.6%
Native Hawaiian and Other Pacific Islander	33	0.0%
Some other race	25,924	18.2%
Two or more races	61,299	43.1%
Hispanic or Latino (of any race)	123,250	86.7%

=== 2010 census ===
As of the census of 2010, 129,877 people, 41,573 households, and 31,823 families resided in the city. Of the 45,862 housing units, 4,289, or 9.4%, were vacant.

The racial makeup of the city was 83.9% White, 0.9% African American, 0.4% Native American, 2.6% Asian, 0.02% Pacific Islander, 10.4% some other race, and 1.8% from two or more races. Hispanics or Latinos of any race were 84.6% of the population.

Of the 41,573 households, 46.0% had children under 18 living with them, 52.2% were married couples living together, 19.0% had a female householder with no husband present, and 23.5% were not families. About 19.1% of all households were made up of individuals, and 23.9% were someone living alone who was 65 or older. The average household size was 3.10, and the average family size was 3.58.

In the city, the age distribution was 30.1% under 18, 9.6% from 18 to 24, 28.1% from 25 to 44, 21.3% from 45 to 64, and 10.9% 65 or older. The median age was 32.2 years. For every 100 females, there were 91.5 males. For every 100 females age 18 and over, there were 87.2 males.

For the period 2012–2016, the estimated median annual income for a household in the city was $45,568, and for a family was $50,184. The per capita income for the city was $21,726. About 22.5% of families and 25.7% of the entire population were below the poverty line, including 36.6% of those under age 18 and 21.4% of those age 65 or over.

== Economy ==
The Rio Grande Valley began its rapid development with the introduction of irrigation in 1898 and the construction of the railroad in 1904. These major additions turned a once relatively desolate area into a major agricultural center. Throughout much of the 1900s, McAllen was a rural, agriculture-based economy characterized by sporadic growth.

Today, the area is transforming into a major international trade area. As recently as 1990, McAllen's unemployment rate was at 22.6%. By the end of 2005, that figure had dropped to 7.7%. However, in 2011, census.gov listed the McAllen metro area the poorest in the nation. As of 2012, the average cost of a home in McAllen was the third-least expensive in the country, at $178,000, while average monthly rent for a two-bedroom apartment was $708. In 2012, the cost of living in McAllen was 16.2% lower than the national average.

=== Trade ===
Since the 1980s and especially since the ratification of the North American Free Trade Agreement in 1994, the focal point of economic activity has shifted from agriculture to international trade, health care, retail, and tourism.

The McAllen Foreign-Trade Zone (FTZ) is located south of McAllen between McAllen and Reynosa. Commissioned in 1973, it was the first inland foreign-trade zone in the United States. Also, an FTZ designation site is at the McAllen Miller International Airport to facilitate air cargo needs. Under U.S. and Mexican laws and NAFTA provisions, the FTZ designation offers specific cost-saving opportunities to manufacturers. Products can be brought into the FTZ duty-free. Services have recently expanded to include full logistic support services, including public warehouse services such as pick and pack, order processing, inventory control, incoming/outgoing quality inspection, and kitting.

== Sports ==
McAllen hosted the NAIA National Football Championship in the late 1970s and NCAA Division II national football championship games in the 1980s.

Until 2014, McAllen was home to the Texas Thunder of the independent United League Baseball, who played at Edinburg Stadium.

== Recreation ==
=== Birdwatching ===
McAllen is positioned on a major flyway, the migratory path of birds between North and South America, presenting opportunities for bird and butterfly expeditions. The landscape hosts a diverse wildlife population. The Quinta Mazatlan, a historic Spanish colonial mansion, is used as McAllen's wing of the World Birding Center. The McAllen Nature Center is a popular spot for bird-watchers and nature enthusiasts alike. This preserved green space offers visitors a chance to explore walking trails, climb a small hill, and has a cactus garden - all without any charge for admission.

The Bicentennial Bike Path runs from Highway 83 on the south side to Bicentennial and Trenton Road on the north side. The International Museum of Art & Science, Smithsonian affiliate and AAM-accredited museum founded in 1967, is located near the path at the corner of Bicentennial and Nolana Avenue.

The Zinnia Spray Water Park is McAllen's first sprayground park. It is located at 29th and Zinnia Ave.

Champion Lakes Golf Course is located on South Ware Road just south of Highway 83. The golf course has 18 holes plus a driving range. This course hosts numerous tournaments year round.

== Government ==
List of mayors of McAllen, Texas
- Frank W. Crow, 1911–1913
- O. P. Archer, 1913–1923
- F.B. Freeland, 1923–1929
- Frank E. Osborn, 1929–1931
- John Ewing, 1931–1934
- A.L. Landry, 1935–1937
- Horace Etchison, 1937–1944
- Dr. Frank Osborn, 1944–1945
- Allen F. Vannoy, 1945–1947
- T. B. Waite, Jr., 1947–1948
- C. W. Davis, 1949–1952
- Angus McLeod, 1952–1953
- Phillip Boeye, 1953–1961
- Robert F. Barnes, 1961–1963
- Paul G. Veale, 1963–1969
- Jack Whetsel, 1969–1977
- Othal E. Brand, 1977–1997
- Leo Montalvo, 1997–2005
- Richard F. Cortez, 2005–2013
- James E. Darling, 2013–2021
- Javier Villalobos, 2021–Present

The Texas Department of Criminal Justice operates an office in McAllen.

=== Federal representation ===
The United States District Court for the Southern District of Texas McAllen Division is located at Bentsen Tower 1701 W. Hwy. 83, Suite 1011, McAllen, Texas.

The United States Postal Service operates two post offices in McAllen: McAllen Post Office, located at 620 Pecan Blvd, and the McAllen Downtown Post Office at 406 12th Street.

The United States Border Patrol McAllen Station is located at 3000 West Military Highway.

The U.S. Customs and Border Protection (CBP) Rio Grande Valley Centralized Processing Center (CPC) is located at 3700 W Ursula Avenue, McAllen, Texas.

The 2LT Luis G. Garcia United States Army Reserve Center located at 600 S Col Rowe Blvd is home for the United States Army Reserve 961st Quartermaster Company, 461st Transportation Detachment, and 519th Transportation Detachment.

McAllen is represented in the United States House of Representatives by Monica De La Cruz (R-Edinburg), of the 15th Congressional District, and Vicente Gonzalez (D-McAllen), of the 34th Congressional District.

== Transportation ==
=== Mass transit ===
Metro McAllen (formerly McAllen Express Transit – MET) has provided public transportation for the City of McAllen since June 1997. In the beginning, McAllen Express was administered by the Lower Rio Grande Valley Development Council. Since 2005, Metro McAllen has been operated as a department of the city of McAllen. Metro McAllen now has 12 fixed routes and paratransit, serving residents and visitors. It operates seven days a week, from 6am–9pm Monday through Saturday and from 8am-6pm on Sunday. LRGVDC continues to operate regional buses under the name Valley Metro.

==== Downtown Bus Terminal ====
The City of McAllen also operates the bus terminal facility in downtown McAllen, known as McAllen Central Station. Central Station serves as a hub for MET and for 14 private domestic and international bus lines. Around 60 buses depart from Central Station on a daily basis. It is centrally located in downtown McAllen at 1501 W Hwy 83.

=== Highways ===
- I-2 travels through McAllen from Taylor Road to Sugar Road.
- US 83 travels through McAllen as its major east–west artery. It runs directly south of downtown.
- SH 107 travels east through McAllen into Downtown Edinburg, where it intersects with the Business Route US 281 and then I-69C/US 281.
- SH 336 travels north to an intersection of FM 1016 in McAllen to an interchange with US-281
- SH 495 travels through McAllen from FM 2220 (Ware Road) to FM 2061 (McColl Street).

=== Airports ===
- McAllen Miller International Airport is served by American Airlines with nonstop service to Dallas/Fort Worth and future service to Phoenix, by United with nonstop service to Houston, by Aeromexico with nonstop service to Mexico City/Santa Lucía, by Delta with nonstop service to Austin, and by Allegiant Air with nonstop flights to Las Vegas and seasonal service to Los Angeles and Orlando-Sanford.

== Education ==
=== Postsecondary ===
- South Texas College has a total of more than 27,000 students attending its five campuses in Hidalgo and Starr counties, and the eSTC virtual campus. The main campus is in McAllen.

=== Primary and secondary schools ===
The McAllen Independent School District serves most of the city followed by the Valley View Independent School District and the Sharyland Independent School District. Portions of the city extend into the Edinburg Consolidated Independent School District, which operates two elementary schools within the McAllen city limits. The Hidalgo Independent School District, Pharr-San Juan-Alamo Independent School District also serve McAllen.

In addition, residents are allowed to apply to magnet schools operated by the South Texas Independent School District.

The Catholic Diocese of Brownsville operates Our Lady of Sorrows School, an elementary and middle school.

=== Public libraries ===
McAllen Public Library operates a main library and two branches, the Lark Branch and the Palm View Branch. The New Main Library opened in the fall of 2011 inside a former Walmart big-box store. The library earned high praise and received the International Interior Design Association's 2012 Library Interior Design Award.

=== Arts and culture ===
International Museum of Art & Science (IMAS), founded in 1967, is a Smithsonian Affiliate and American Alliance of Museums (AAM) accredited museum located in McAllen at the corner of Bicentennial and Nolana Avenue.

== Media ==
=== Television stations ===
- XHTAM-TV 2 Reynosa, Tamaulipas Las Estrellas
- KGBT-TV 4 Harlingen, Texas The CW
- KRGV-TV 5 Weslaco, Texas ABC
- XHAB-TV 8 Matamoros, Tamaulipas Vallevision
- XERV-TV 9 Reynosa, Tamaulipas Las Estrellas
- XHREY-TV 1 Reynosa, Tamaulipas Azteca Uno
- XHOR-TV 7 Reynosa, Tamaulipas Azteca 7
- KVEO 23 Brownsville, Texas NBC/CBS
- KTFV-CD 32 McAllen, Texas UniMás
- KTLM 40 Rio Grande City, Texas Telemundo
- KNVO 48 McAllen, Texas Univision
- XHVTV-TV 6 Reynosa, Tamaulipas Multimedios (Canal 6 Mexico)
- KFXV 60 Harlingen, Texas FOX
- KMBH-LD 67 McAllen, Texas FOX
- [ MCN ] 17.12 McAllen, Texas Public Broadcasting Station

=== Radio stations ===
- KURV 710 AM News Talk Radio
- XERDO-AM La Raza 1060 AM (Regional Mexican) [Spanish]
- XEMS-AM Radio Mexicana 1490 AM (Regional Mexican) [Spanish]
- KHID 88.1 FM McAllen (National Public Radio)
- XHRYS-FM Ultra 90.1 FM [Spanish]
- XHRYN-FM Uni 90.5 FM [Spanish]
- XHRYA-FM Mas Music 90.9 FM (Hit Radio) [Spanish]
- XHMLS-FM Exitos 91.3 FM (All-Time Hits) [Spanish]
- KCAS The New KCAS 91.5 FM
- XHEOQ-FM Notigape 91.7 FM (News) [Spanish]
- XHAAA-FM La Caliente 93.1 FM (Regional Mexican) [Spanish]
- KFRQ Q94.5 FM (Classic/Modern/Hard Rock)
- XHRT-FM @FM (Arroba FM) 95.3 FM (All-Time Hits) [Spanish]
- KBTQ Recuerdo 96.1 FM (Oldies) [Spanish]
- KVMV Family Friendly & Commercial Free 96.9 FM (Adult Contemporary Christian)
- KGBT-FM Solamente Exitos 98.5 FM (Regional Mexican) [Spanish]
- KKPS Fuego 99.5 FM (CHR) [Spanish]
- KTEX South Texas Country 100.3 FM (Country)
- KNVO-FM La Suavecita 101.1 FM [Spanish]
- XHAVO-FM Digital 101.5 FM (International Music) [Spanish]
- KBUC Super Tejano 102.1 FM (Tejano) [Spanish]
- XHRR-FM La Ley 102.5 FM (Regional Mexican) [Spanish]
- KBFM Wild 104.1 FM (Hip-Hop/R&B/Reggaeton)
- KJAV Life Radio 104.9 (Contemporary Christian)
- KQXX Kiss 105.5 FM
- KHKZ Kiss 106.3 FM (Hot AC)
- XHVTH-FM La Comadre 107.1 FM (Regional Mexican) (in Spanish)
- KVLY RGV FM 107.9 FM (Top 40)

=== Area newspapers ===
- The Monitor
- Valley Morning Star
- Texas Border Business
- Mega Doctor News

== Architecture and points of interest ==
- Tallest buildings

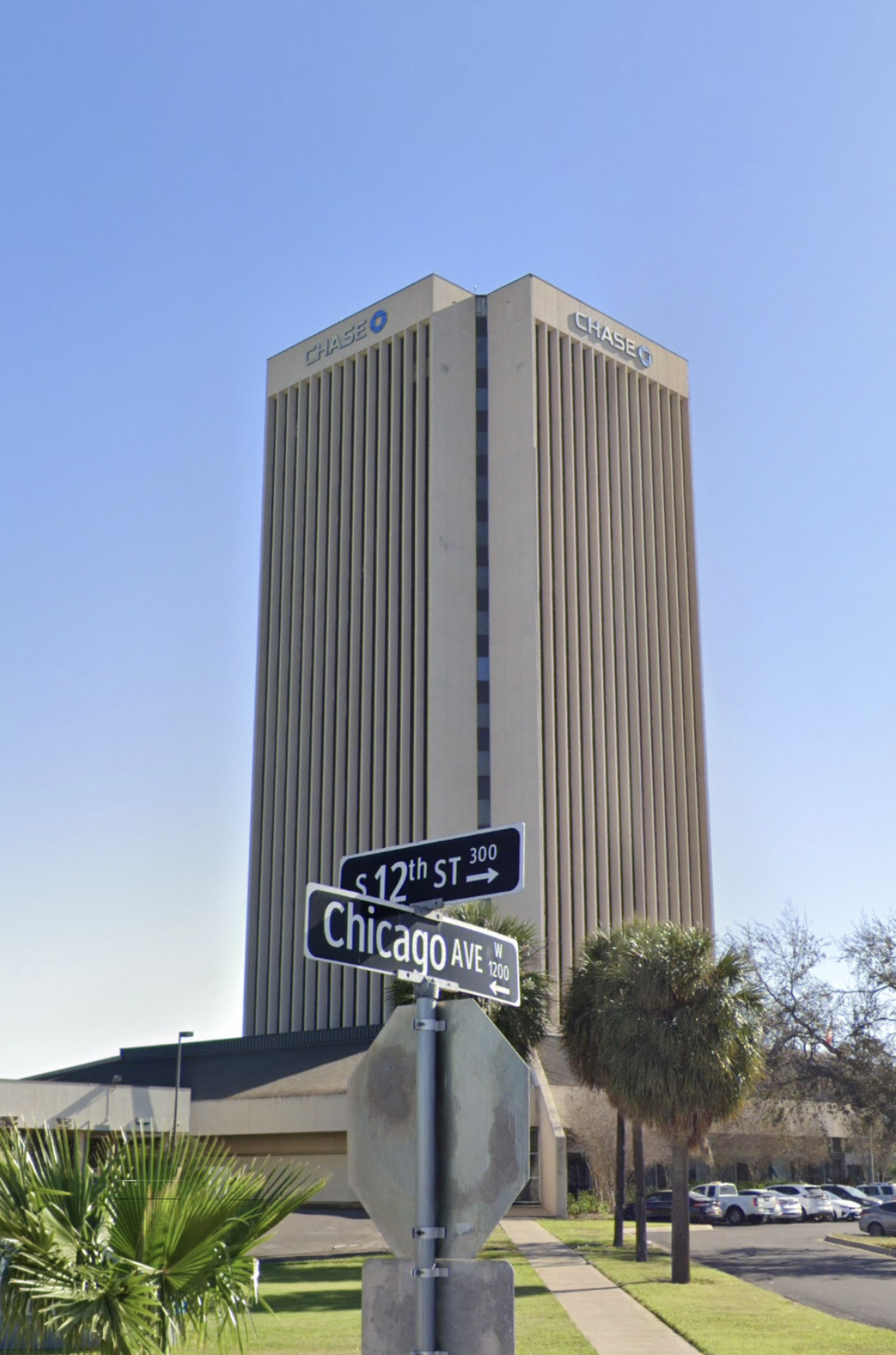
The Chase Bank Tower (officially the Neuhaus Tower) is the tallest building in McAllen. It was built in 1980 and is located in the downtown area.

Rank	Building	Height
1	Chase Neuhaus Tower	17 Floors
2	PNC Bank Building	11 Floors
3	Bentsen Tower	11 Floors
4	DoubleTree Suites by Hilton Hotel	9 Floors
5	McAllen Medical Center	8 Floors
6	Inter National Bank	6 Floors

- Districts

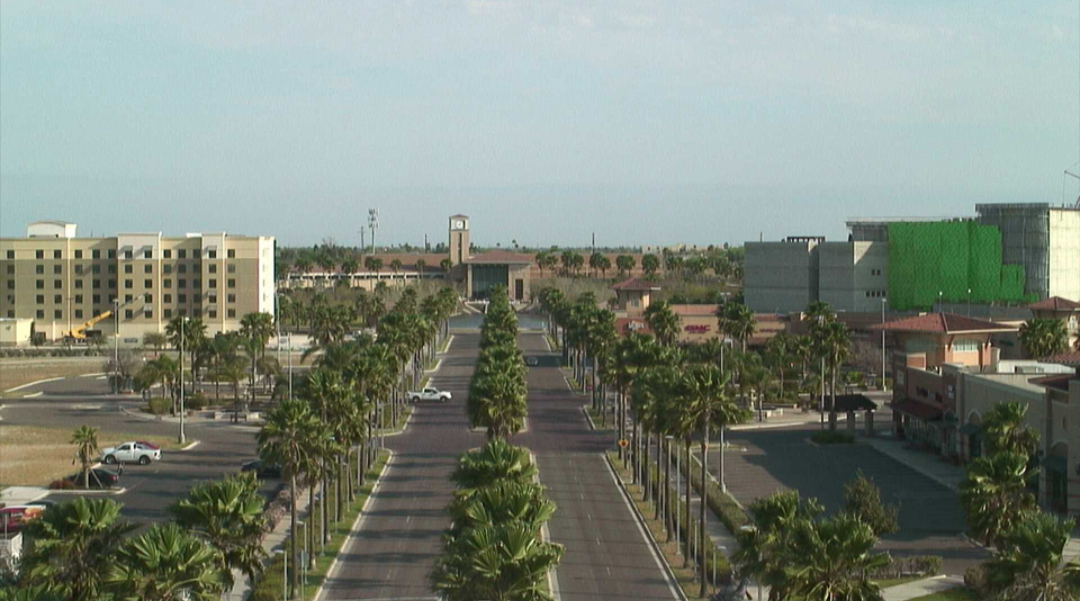
McAllen Convention Center District

1. Downtown McAllen
2. De Palmas Historic District
3. 17 Street Entertainment District
4. McAllen Arts District
5. Uptown McAllen
6. McAllen Convention Center District
- Points of Interest

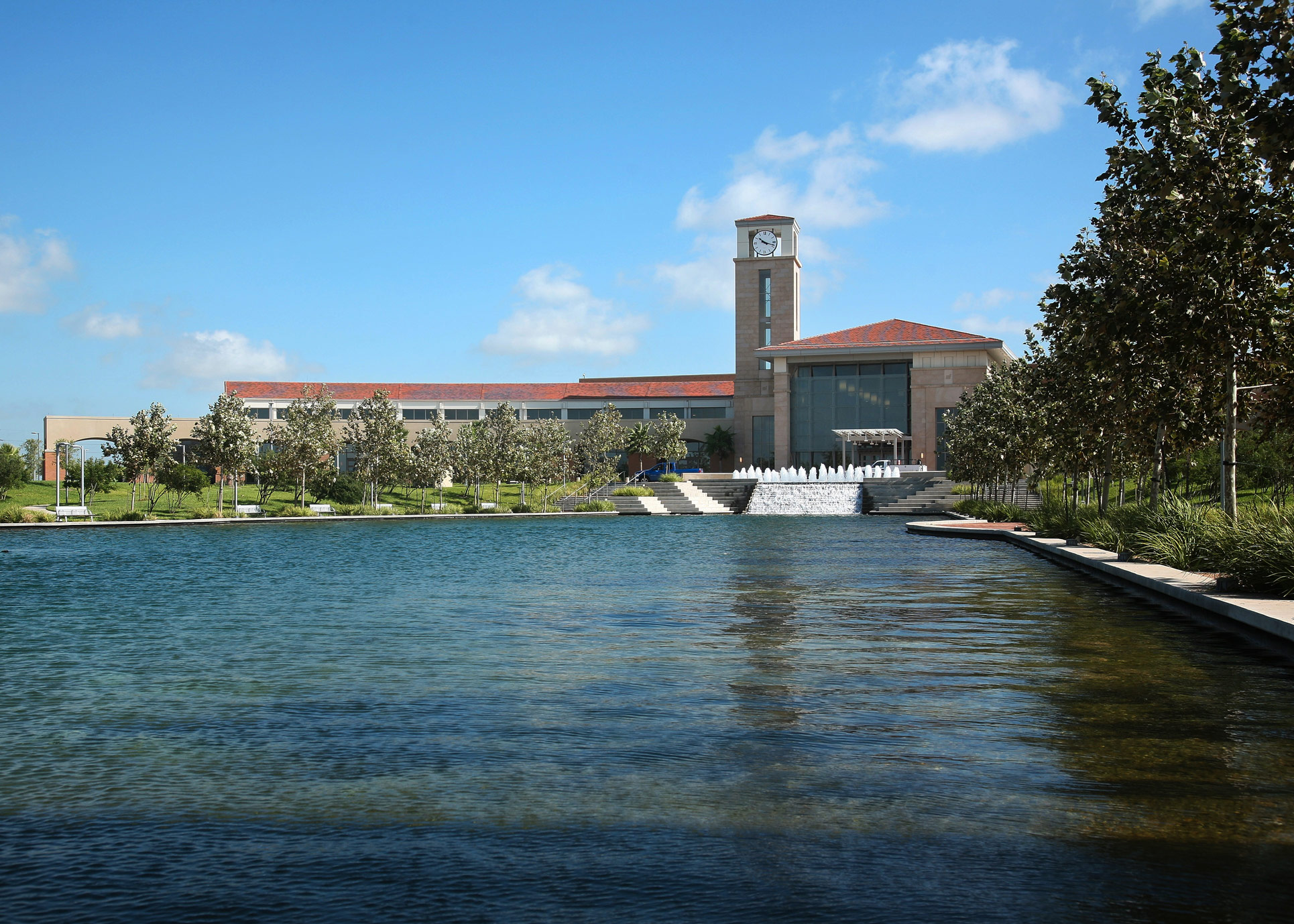
McAllen Convention Center

1. McAllen Nature Center
2. Quinta Mazatlan
3. McAllen Convention Center
4. La Plaza Mall
5. International Museum of Art & Science
6. Historic Cine El Rey Theatre
7. Veteran's War Memorial of Texas
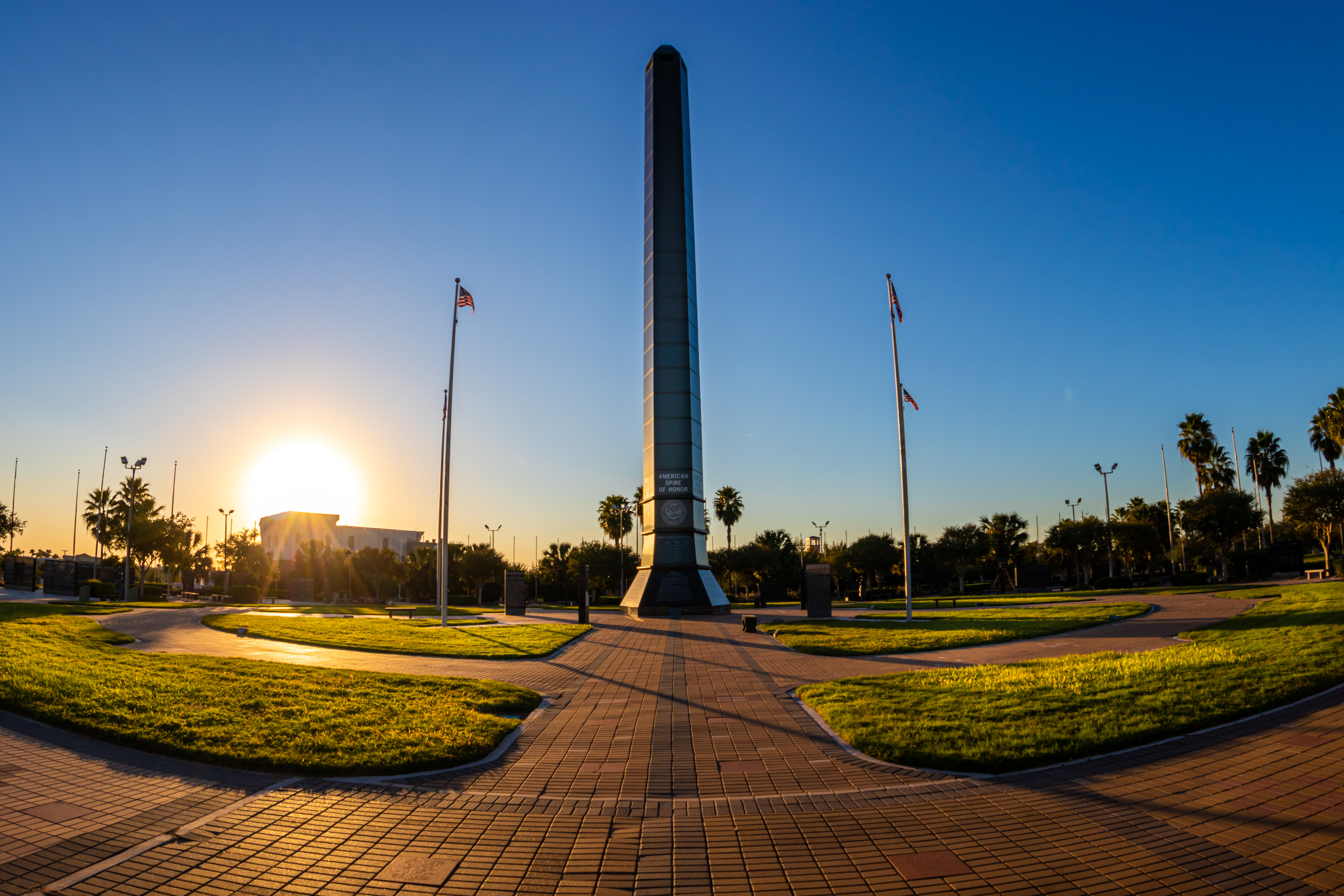
  Veteran's War Memorial of Texas

== Notable people ==
- Cristela Alonzo, a stand-up comedian and actress, was given the Key to the City in 2019.
- Abraham Ancer, a professional golfer, was born in McAllen.
- Viola Canales, a lecturer in law and writer, was born in McAllen in 1957.
- Jorge Cantú, a baseball player, was born in McAllen in 1982.
- Shaine Casas, a competitive swimmer, was raised in McAllen.
- Raúl Castillo, an actor, was born in McAllen in 1977.
- Michael Cole is a professional wrestling commentator for WWE.
- Ana Brenda Contreras, a Mexican-American actress and singer, was born in McAllen on December 24, 1986.
- Henry Cuesta, a clarinetist on The Lawrence Welk Show, was born in McAllen in 1931.
- Matt Gonzalez, former San Francisco supervisor and running mate of Ralph Nader in the 2008 presidential election, born in McAllen in 1965
- Vicente Gonzalez, U.S. representative, lives in McAllen
- Catherine Hardwicke, a film director, though born in Cameron, Texas, grew up in McAllen.
- Gina Hinojosa, first Hispanic governor of Texas
- Carl Möhner, an actor, director, screenwriter, and painter was born in Vienna in 1921, and died 2005 in McAllen.
- Elizabeth Moon, fantasy and science fiction writer who won the Nebula Award in 2003, was raised in McAllen.
- James Nicholas Rowe, a colonel United States Army, was born in McAllen in 1938.
- Gladys Tamez, a celebrity milliner, was born in McAllen.
- Gloria Trevi, a Mexican pop star, was born in Monterrey, Nuevo Leon, Mexico, but now lives in McAllen.
- Vanessa Angélica Villarreal, poet, essayist, and cultural critic.

== Sister cities ==
McAllen, Texas sister cities

- Cadereyta Jiménez, Mexico
- Chilpancingo de los Bravo, Mexico
- Ciudad Victoria, Mexico
- García, Mexico
- Guadalupe, Mexico
- Irapuato, Mexico
- Monterrey, Mexico
- Reynosa, Mexico
- San Luis Potosí, Mexico
- Tampico, Mexico
- Taxco de Alarcón, Mexico
- Zihuatanejo de Azueta, Mexico
