= McAllen Nature Center =

City-operated nature preserve in McAllen, Texas, United States

Coordinates: 26.2164°N 98.2364°W

- Interactive map of McAllen Nature Center
- Type: Nature preserve
- Location: McAllen, Texas
- Area: 20 acres (8.1 ha)
- Website: Official website

McAllen Nature Center (20 acres), formerly known as McAllen Botanical Gardens, is a city-operated nature preserve located in McAllen, Texas at 4101 West Business US 83. The site is between Ware and Bentsen Roads on the west side of McAllen, not far from the McAllen Convention Center.

The gardens were established in 1962, with an emphasis on palms. The site is no longer maintained as a botanical garden but as a general nature site. The site contains three quarters of a mile of trails through pristine native thornscrub habitat with birding opportunities and It also has picnic areas.
