= H-1C visa =

Discontinued US visa program for foreign nurses

The H-1C visa was a visa that was previously available to foreign nationals seeking temporary employment in the United States. These visas were made available to foreign nurses coming into the United States to perform services as a registered nurse in areas with a shortage of health professionals as determined by the Department of Labor. The creation of this visa was prompted by a nursing shortage.

As of December 20, 2009, this visa classification has been expired. The last H-1C visas were issued in Fiscal Year 2012.

== Program details ==
This non-immigrant/temporary worker classification was introduced by the United States Citizenship and Immigration Services in 1999 to specifically address the lack of nurses in the United States.

=== Eligibility ===
To qualify for an H-1C visa one must have:

- Had a full and unrestricted nursing license in their country of origin or have received nursing education and had been licensed in the United States.
- Been authorized by the U.S. State Board of Nursing to practice within the state.
- Passed the examination given by the Commission on Graduates for Foreign Nursing Schools.
- Been fully qualified and eligible under state law of intended employment to practice as a Registered Nurse immediately upon admission to the U.S.

==== Eligible hospitals ====
Only 14 hospitals were publicly approved to participate in the H-1C visa program. These hospitals are:

1. Beverly Hospital, Montebello, California
2. Doctors Medical Center, Modesto, California
3. Elizabeth General Medical Center, Elizabeth, New Jersey
4. Fairview Park Hospital, Dublin, Georgia
5. Lutheran Medical Center, St. Louis, Missouri
6. Mercy Medical Center, Baltimore, Maryland
7. St. Bernard Hospital, Chicago, Illinois
8. Peninsula Hospital Medical Center, Far Rockaway, New York
9. Southeastern Regional Medical Center, Lumberton, North Carolina
10. McAllen Medical Center, McAllen, Texas
11. Beaumont Regional Medical Center, Beaumont, Texas
12. Mercy Regional Medical Center, Laredo, Texas
13. Southwest General Hospital, San Antonio, Texas
14. Valley Baptist Medical Center, Harlingen, Texas

However, the Department of Labor stated that there may have been other hospitals eligible to participate.

=== Application ===
The Form I-129, Petition for a Nonimmigrant Worker, had to be filed by a U.S. employer hospital that had received a notice of acceptance of the attestation for H-1C Nonimmigrant Nurses, from the United States Citizenship and Immigration Services.

The Form I-129 had to include the following documents:

- The Department of Labor’s acceptance of Form ETA-9081, Attestation for H-1C Nonimmigrant Nurses
- A Statement from the facility noting restrictions which the laws of the state or jurisdiction of intended employment place on one's services
- Evidence that one has been authorized by a State Board of Nursing to engage in registered nurse practice in a state or U.S. territory or possession, and one has or will be practicing at a facility which provides health care services
- Evidence that one have obtained a full and unrestricted license to practice professional nursing in the country where one obtained nursing education or have received nursing education in the U.S.
- Evidence that one is fully qualified and eligible under the laws governing the place of intended employment to practice as a Registered Nurse immediately upon admission to the U.S.

An approved Form I-129 could be used to apply for a H-1C visa from a United States consulate abroad (consulates are under the U.S. Department of State) or change status to H-1C status within the United States if already present in legal status.

== Limitations ==
There were several restrictions placed on this visa during its implementation and valid period.

- No more than 500 H-1C visas are approved each year.
- This visa cannot be extended upon the initial three year period.
- Dependents of the H-1C visa holder are not permitted to work in the U.S.
- Once an H-1C visa holders returns to their country of origin, they cannot reapply for a H-1C visa.
- Hospitals must approved by the Department of Labor be qualified to hire H-1C visa holders. See list mentioned above of eligible hospitals.
- If there is a change in employers, the H-1C visa holder must apply for a new H-1C visa.

== History ==
On November 12, 1999, the 106th United States Congress passed the Nursing Relief for Disadvantaged Areas Act (P.L. 106-95), which called for the creation of a new H-1C visa for nurses going to work for up to three years in health professional shortage areas. Up to 500 nurses per year can get the visa, but each state is limited to 25 H-1C nurses a year. The 1999 law is very similar to a 1989 law that created the H-1A visa for nurses. That visa category had expired in 1995 after unsuccessful efforts to extend its life.

The key differences between the two programs are:

- The number of H-1C visas is capped at 500 per year, significantly less than the annual number of H-1A visas issued when the H-1A was first introduced.
- The facility where the nurse will work must be in a health professional shortage area.

One of the few immigration measures passed by the 109th United States Congress was the extension of the H-1C category. In November 2006, Congress approved legislation to extend the H-1C program for three more years. This classification expired as of December 20, 2009. The last H-1C visas were issued in Fiscal Year 2012.

== Statistics ==
Below are H-1C visas issued each year. Years here are Fiscal Years. For instance, Fiscal Year 2004 is the period from October 1, 2003 to September 30, 2004.

Year	Total Number of Visas Issued	Numbers of Visas Issued to Each Country
1999	0	-
2000	0	-
2001	34	34 issued in Belize
2002	211	210 in Philippines, 1 in Egypt, 1 in South Africa
2003	191	183 in Philippines, 1 in Lebanon, 1 in India, 1 in Serbia, 1 in Northern Ireland, 1 in Ireland, 1 in South Africa, 1 in Nigeria, 1 in Kenya
2004	110	106 in Philippines, 2 in mainland China, 1 in India, 1 in Finland
2005	62	59 in Philippines, 2 in Northern Ireland, 1 in Ghana
2006	8	7 in Philippines, 1 in Taiwan
2007	26	24 in Philippines, 1 in Northern Ireland, 1 in Australia
2008	143	32 in Thailand, 26 in Philippines, 26 in Denmark, 25 in Great Britain and Northern Ireland, 13 in Ireland, 10 in Nepal, 1 in Zambia, 1 in India, 1 in Kuwait, 1 in Slovakia, 1 in Jamaica, 1 in Australia, 1 in New Zealand, 1 in Brazil
2009	121	107 in Philippines, 3 in South Korea, 2 in India, 2 in Germany, 2 in Great Britain and Northern Ireland, 1 in Ireland, 1 in France, 1 in Moldova, 1 in Sweden, 1 in Tanzania
2010	86	56 in Philippines, 14 in Jamaica, 3 in Great Britain and Northern Ireland, 1 in Unknown, 1 in Brazil, 1 in Panama, 1 in Mexico, 1 in The Bahamas, 1 in Belize, 1 in Pakistan
2011	128	107 in Philippines, 3 in South Korea, 2 in Indonesia, 2 in Germany, 2 in Great Britain and Northern Ireland, 1 in Ireland, 1 in Tanzania, 1 in Malaysia, 1 in Monaco, 1 in Switzerland
2012	174	156 in Philippines, 2 in South Korea, 2 in Mainland China, 1 in Nepal, 1 in Australia, 1 in Jamaica, 1 in New Zealand,1 in Slovakia, 1 in Brazil, 1 in Zambia, 1 in India,

== See also ==
- H-1A visa
- H-1B visa
- TN visa
