= XHCAO-FM =

Radio station in Ciudad Camargo, Tamaulipas, Mexico

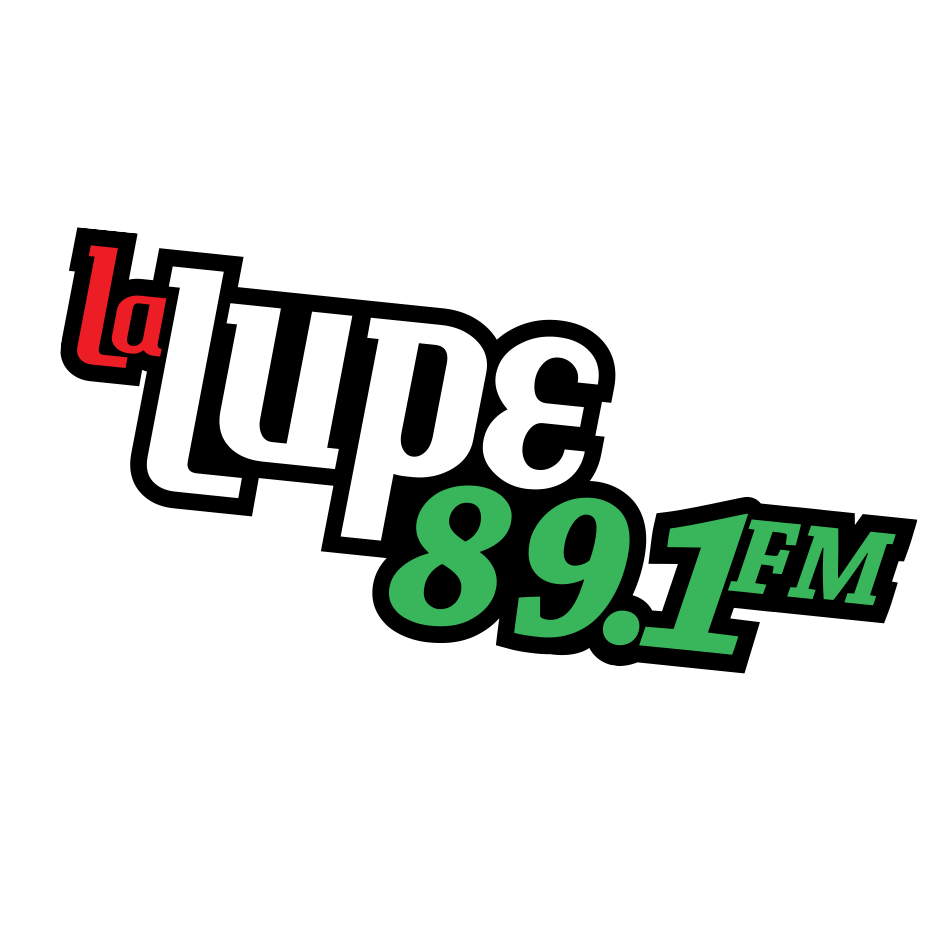
- Ciudad Camargo, Tamaulipas; Mexico
- Frequency: 89.1 MHz
- Branding: La Lupe

Programming
- Format: Regional Mexican

Ownership
- Owner: Radio United; (Radio Ultra, S.A. de C.V.)
- Sister stations: KURV; KBUC; XHRYS-FM; XHAVO-FM; XHRR-FM;

History
- First air date: August 16, 1994 (concession)
- Call sign meaning: Ciudad Camargo

Technical information
- Licensing authority: CRT
- Class: B
- ERP: 50,000 watts
- HAAT: 99.94 m (327.9 ft)
- Repeater: XEGH-AM 620 kHz (Río Bravo)

Links
- Webcast: Listen live
- Website: www.lalupe891.com

XHCAO-FM is a radio station on 89.1 FM in Ciudad Camargo, Tamaulipas. The station is owned by Radio United and carries a Regional Mexican format known as La Lupe.

== History ==
XHCAO originally began on 101.7 FM, with a concession awarded to Liza Garza Acosta on August 16, 1994. In 2000, it was sold to Radio BMP de Ciudad Camargo, around the same time it was moved to 89.1.

It broadcast the formats La Comadre, La Mejor (from MVS Radio) and La Ley until 2006 when it was transferred to XHRR-FM.

In April 2019, R Communications sold the Radio United stations in Mexico, including XHCAO, XHAVO, and XHRR, to Radio Ultra, S.A. de C.V., a company owned by the Bichara family. The Federal Telecommunications Institute (IFT) approved the transfer on September 2, 2020.
