= Jim Darling =

American politician (born 1949)

20th Mayor of McAllen
- In office January 6, 2013 – June 14, 2021
- Preceded by: Richard Cortez
- Succeeded by: Javier Villalobos

Personal details
- Born: Jim Darling; January 14, 1949 (age 77) Rochester, New York, U.S.
- Party: Democratic
- Education: Baylor University (BA); Baylor Law School (JD)

Jim Darling (born January 14, 1949) is an American politician who served as the 20th mayor of McAllen, Texas from 2013 to 2021. He won re-election in May 2017.

== Education ==
Darling received a Bachelor of Arts degree from Baylor University and a J.D. from Baylor Law School and is a licensed litigator by the Texas Supreme Court and the Southern District of Texas Federal Court.

== Career ==
Darling spent 28 years as a city attorney with the city of McAllen and other governmental entities and served as City Commissioner for District 6 prior to being elected Mayor of McAllen.

== Views on proposed border wall ==
In an interview with NPR after Donald Trump visited McAllen in January 2019, Darling said “The other thing that he said that we thought was important - it's not just a wall. It's border protection. It's more boots on the ground, more Border Patrol men, more technology, roads that they need, etc.“

While he believes the United States needs border protection, he feels “a wall doesn't make sense, especially when the Rio Grande acts as a natural border and where private property makes building a wall more complicated.”
