= XHAAA-FM =

Radio station in Reynosa, Tamaulipas, Mexico

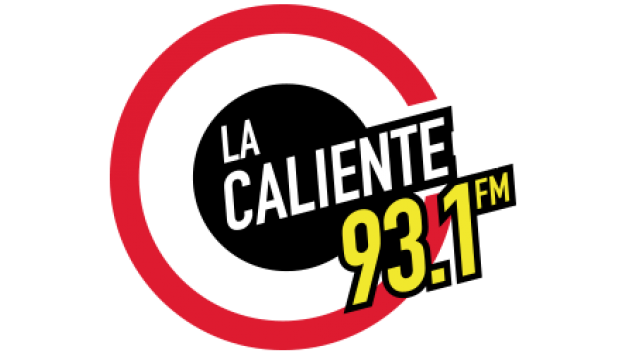
- Reynosa, Tamaulipas; Mexico
- Broadcast area: Rio Grande Valley
- Frequency: 93.1 MHz
- Branding: La Caliente

Programming
- Format: Regional Mexican

Ownership
- Owner: Multimedios Radio; (La Voz de Linares, S.A.)
- Sister stations: XHRYS-FM; XHVTH-FM; XHVTV-TDT;

History
- First air date: November 22, 1979 (concession)

Technical information
- Licensing authority: CRT
- Class: B
- ERP: 100,000 watts
- HAAT: 145.8 meters (478 ft)
- Transmitter coordinates: 25°56′33″N 97°54′25″W

Links
- Webcast: Listen Live
- Website: mmradio.com

XHAAA-FM (branded as La Caliente 93.1 FM) is a Regional Mexican radio station that serves the Reynosa, Tamaulipas/McAllen, Texas border area. It broadcasts from the Multimedios tower at El Control, Tamaulipas, between Reynosa and Matamoros.

== History ==
XHAAA received its concession on November 22, 1979. The original concession holder was Francisco González Sánchez, the current president of Grupo Multimedios. It begins broadcasting ballad pop and memory music as Radio Recuerdo. In the early 90s, Radio Recuerdo, moved to new station XHRYS-FM 90.1, and XHAAA is renaming to Super Estelar with a Regional Mexican format and in 2000 it took the current name.
