= McAllen Public Library =

Library system serving McAllen in Texas

Coordinates: 26°14′30″N 98°14′32″W

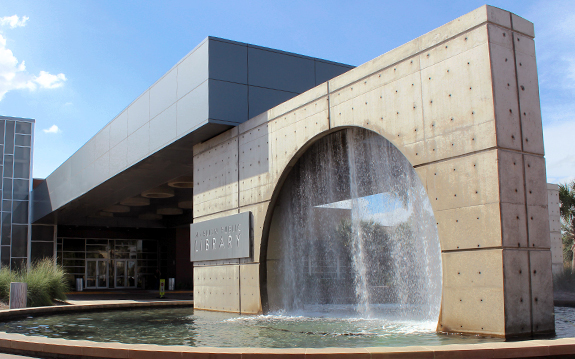
Fountain at main entrance to McAllen Public Library

McAllen Public Library, or MPL, is the public library system serving McAllen, Texas, United States.

== Overview ==
McAllen Public Library (MPL) serves the community of McAllen and the Rio Grande Valley through three branch libraries. The library system's collection includes audiobooks on CD, Blu-Rays, books, DVDs, eBooks, eMagazines, music CDs, and magazine and newspaper subscriptions. With a valid McAllen Public Library card, or a valid card from any participating library in the Hidalgo County Library System, patrons may borrow and request items.

Other services provided by MPL include Ask a Librarian, interlibrary loan, obituary requests, services for patrons with disabilities, study rooms, test proctoring, and tours.

In 2014, McAllen Public Library launched its eBranch. The eBranch is a collection of free digital resources, some requiring a valid MPL card, categorized into the following topics: eBooks, Audiobooks, Newsstand, Research, eLearning, College & Career, and en Español.

The Library Board holds meetings that are open to the public and makes recommendations to the City Commission concerning operating policy of McAllen Public Library and long-range capital improvement planning.

== History ==
McAllen Public Library's beginnings can be traced back to 1932, when the McAllen Study Club opened a one-room library at the McAllen Chamber of Commerce. The new library was open on Saturdays and the first librarian was Miss Elinor Hambrick. In 1934, the library relocated to First Baptist Church before being relocated again in 1936 to the basement of the Archer Park Bandstand. In 1944, the library was granted municipal status and embarked on a fund drive for a new building.

In 1949, construction began after the site at the corner of Main Street and Fir Street are chosen for a new building. On May 28, 1950, the McAllen Memorial Library opened for business and was dedicated as a memorial to McAllen residents who died in World War II. Mrs. Ruth Abbott became the first librarian at McAllen Memorial Library. Additions were made to the structure in 1957 and included an auditorium, youth room, and a periodical room. Expansion continued in 1967 with a new wing that included the circulation desk and a second floor mezzanine. By 1976, complete second and third floors had been added to the north side of the building.

McAllen citizens elected to implement a half-cent sales tax for economic development in May 1997, which led to the construction of two new library branches. During the fall of 1999, construction began on the two branch libraries in the north and south areas of McAllen. On January 18, 2001, the Lark Branch Library and the Palm View Branch Library opened their doors to the public.

MPL celebrated its 75th anniversary on November 12, 2007 and prepared for construction of a new building at the intersection of Nolana Avenue and 23rd Street.

After serving the public for 61 years, the Old Main Library (McAllen Memorial Library) closed on November 23, 2011.

On December 10, 2011, the New Main Library opened.

== Locations ==
=== Headquarters ===
Main Library exists inside a former Walmart big box store. Opened in December 2011, it is the largest single-floor library in the United States, occupying 125,000 square feet (11,600 m^{2}), or two and a half times the area of a standard US football playing field.

The design, by Meyer Scherer & Rockcastle Ltd. (MSR) of Minneapolis, won the International Interior Design Association (IIDA) 2012 Library Interior Design Competition. In 2013, the design also won the Honor Award for Interior Architecture, which is the highest honor for interior design awarded by the American Institute of Architects (AIA). The awards selection jury noted that "The interior spaces have been dramatically transformed from a warehouse to a place with a sense of intimacy." The building addresses sustainable design, including careful materials selection for optimal indoor air quality, use of recycled materials, energy and water conservation, and ease of community access.

The new library has a spacious layout featuring an art gallery, 16 public meeting spaces, 14 public study rooms, a quiet reading room, 64 computers in the general computer lab, a computer lab for teenagers, a children’s computer lab, and two genealogy computers. The building also includes self check-out units for borrowers, an auditorium, an art gallery, a used bookstore, an outdoor Dewey Decimal Learning Trail, and a cafe. The new library appears to be popular. New user registrations increased by 23 percent in the first month since its opening.

=== Branch libraries ===
In addition to the Main Library, there are two branch libraries. The Lark Branch Library is the north branch located at 2601 Lark Avenue and the Palm View Branch is the south branch located at 3401 Jordan Avenue.

=== Former locations ===
McAllen Memorial Library (Old Main Library) was located at 601 North Main Street and closed on November 23, 2011.

=== Partnership libraries ===
MPL forms part of the Hidalgo County Library System. The Hidalgo County Library System also includes the libraries from the following cities: Alamo, Donna, Edinburg, Elsa, Hidalgo, La Joya, Mercedes, Mission, Penitas, Pharr, San Juan and Weslaco.

=== Awards ===
Awards that MPL has won include: Texas Municipal Library Directors Association Award for Library Excellence 2014, 2015, and 2016, AIA Honor Award for Interior Architecture, ALA/IIDA Library Interior Design Awards for Best Overall and Best of Category (Public Libraries Over 30,000 SF), AIA Minnesota Honor Award, and the IIDA Northland Chapter FAB Award.
