= KURV =

Radio station in Edinburg, Texas

Coordinates: 26°19′43″N 98°09′35″W

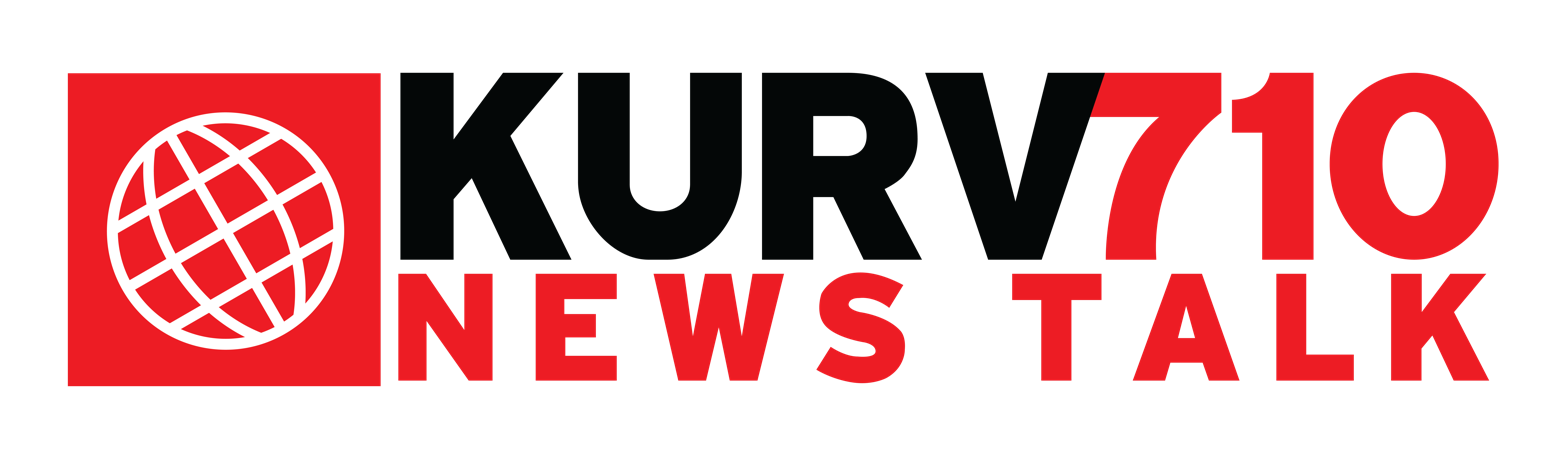
- Edinburg, Texas; United States
- Broadcast area: McAllen; Brownsville; Harlingen; (Rio Grande Valley)
- Frequency: 710 kHz
- Branding: News Talk 710 KURV

Programming
- Format: News-talk
- Network: Fox News Radio
- Affiliations: Premiere Networks; Westwood One; Radio America

Ownership
- Owner: Grupo Multimedios; (Leading Media Group Corp.)
- Sister stations: KBUC; XHCAO-FM; XHRYS-FM; XHAVO-FM; XHRR-FM

History
- First air date: October 19, 1947

Technical information
- Licensing authority: FCC
- Facility ID: 70463
- Class: B
- Power: 1,000 watts days; 910 watts nights

Links
- Public license information: Public file; LMS
- Webcast: Listen live
- Website: www.kurv.com

KURV (710 kHz) is a commercial AM radio station licensed to Edinburg, Texas, United States, and serving the Rio Grande Valley. It broadcasts a news-talk format and is owned by Grupo Multimedios, through licensee Leading Media Group Corp. The studios and offices are on North Jackson Road in McAllen.

By day, KURV is powered at 1,000 watts. At night it slightly reduces power to 910 watts. It uses a directional antenna at all times, with a three-tower array at night. The transmitter is off W Rogers Road at Business U.S. Route 281, 2 miles north of Edinburg.

== Programming ==
Weekdays begin with a local news and information show, The Valley’s Morning News With Sergio Sanchez. Sanchez continues for another two hours with a talk show. Afternoons feature The Drive Home with Zack Cantu, and Davis Rankin. The rest of the weekday schedule is made up of nationally syndicated conservative talk programs, including Brian Kilmeade and Friends, The Dana Loesch Show, The Michael Berry Show, The Charlie Kirk Show, The Ramsey Show with Dave Ramsey, Coast to Coast AM with George Noory, America in the Morning with John Trout and This Morning, America's First News with Gordon Deal.

Weekends feature shows on money, health, religion, travel, technology, hunting, fishing and the outdoors. Weekend syndicated programs include The Kim Komando Show, RM Travel with Rudy Maxa and Somewhere in Time with Art Bell, as well as repeats of weekday shows. Most hours begin with an update from Fox News Radio.

== History ==
KURV first signed on on the air on October 19, 1947. It broadcast with 250 watts of power and was a daytime only station, required to go off the air at sunset to avoid interfering with other stations. KURV was owned by J.C. Looney.

A sister station, KURV-FM, began broadcasting two months later, on December 25, 1947. It used 104.9 MHz with 1,000 watts effective radiated power. Few people owned FM radios in that era and management eventually turned in the license and took KURV-FM dark. Today, the frequency is home to KJAV-FM.

On March 17, 1997, the Federal Communications Commission (FCC) announced that 88 stations had been given permission to move to newly available "Expanded Band" transmitting frequencies, ranging from 1610 to 1700 kHz, with KURV authorized to move from 710 to 1640 kHz. However, the station never procured the construction permit needed to implement the authorization, so the expanded band station was never built.

In 2004, Border Media Partners bought KURV and KSOX in Raymondville for $7.5 million. MBM Texas Valley LLC later acquired KURV, co-owned with KBUC in Raymondville and KESO in South Padre Island.

Effective February 10, 2021, MBM sold KURV and three sister stations to Grupo Multimedios for $6 million.
