= Downtown McAllen =

Coordinates: 26.200°N 98.235°W

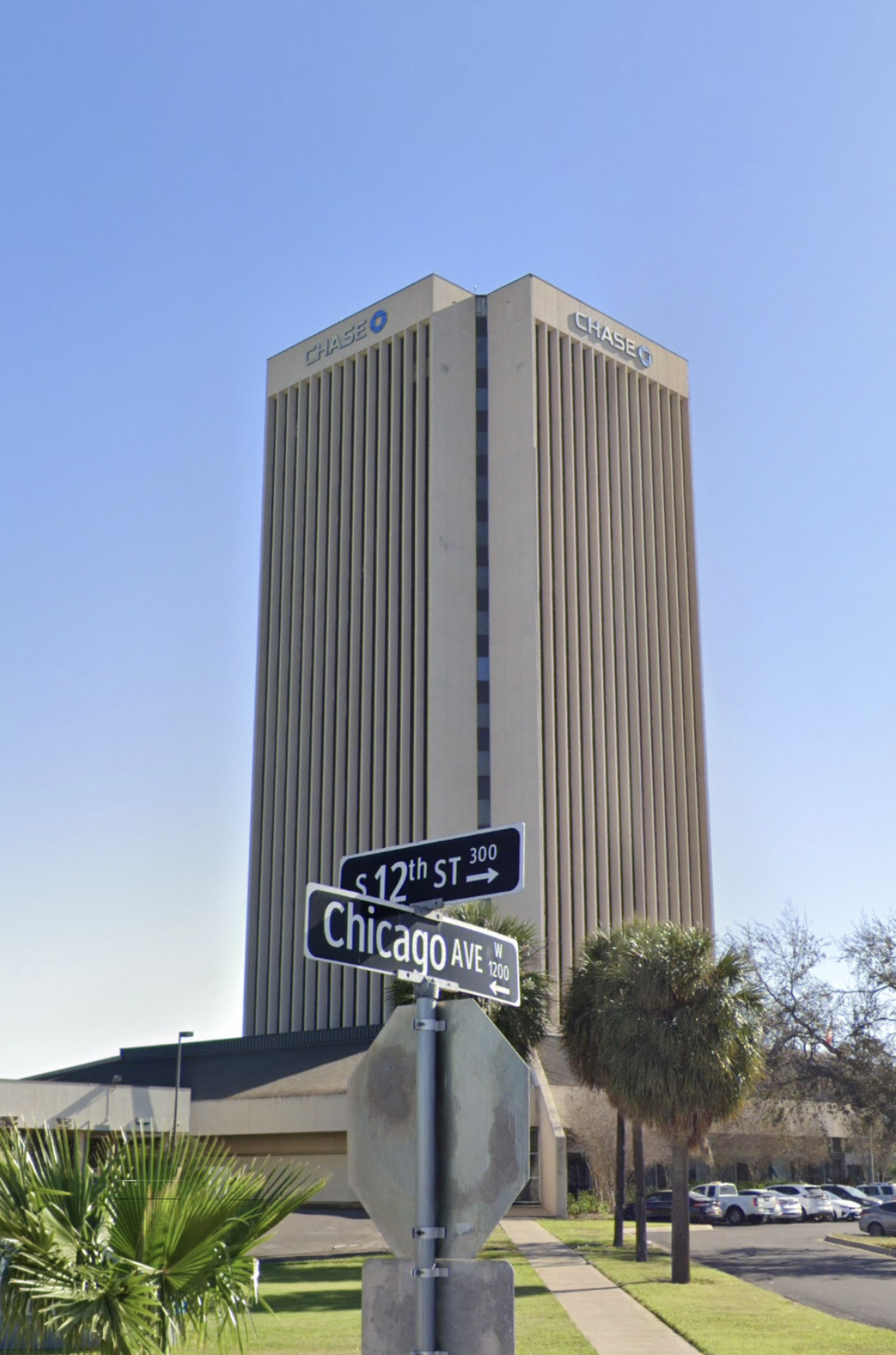
- The Chase Bank Tower in Downtown McAllen.
- Interactive map of Downtown McAllen
- Country: United States
- State: Texas
- Counties: Hidalgo
- City: McAllen
- Elevation: 112 ft (34 m)
- ZIP codes: 78501, 78502
- Area code: 956

Downtown McAllen is the area west of 10th Street, east of Bicentennial Boulevard, south of Hackberry Avenue and north of Interstate 2.

It is the central business district of the city, and the surrounding Hidalgo County with over 250 retail businesses, the McAllen City Hall, the Mexican Consulate, the Honduran Consulate, the Guatemalan Consulate, the Salvadoran Consulate, medical offices, banks, the city's bus central station and the downtown parking garage. Of the 18 million people that visit the city yearly, it is estimated that 5,516,000 pedestrians visit the area.

The two tallest towers in the area, and the city, are the Chase Neuhaus Tower and the Bentsen Tower. 17th Street in Downtown is lined with many bars, pubs, lounges, restaurants, and music venues. It is also home to the historic Cine El Rey.
