= XHRR-FM =

Radio station in Reynosa, Tamaulipas, Mexico

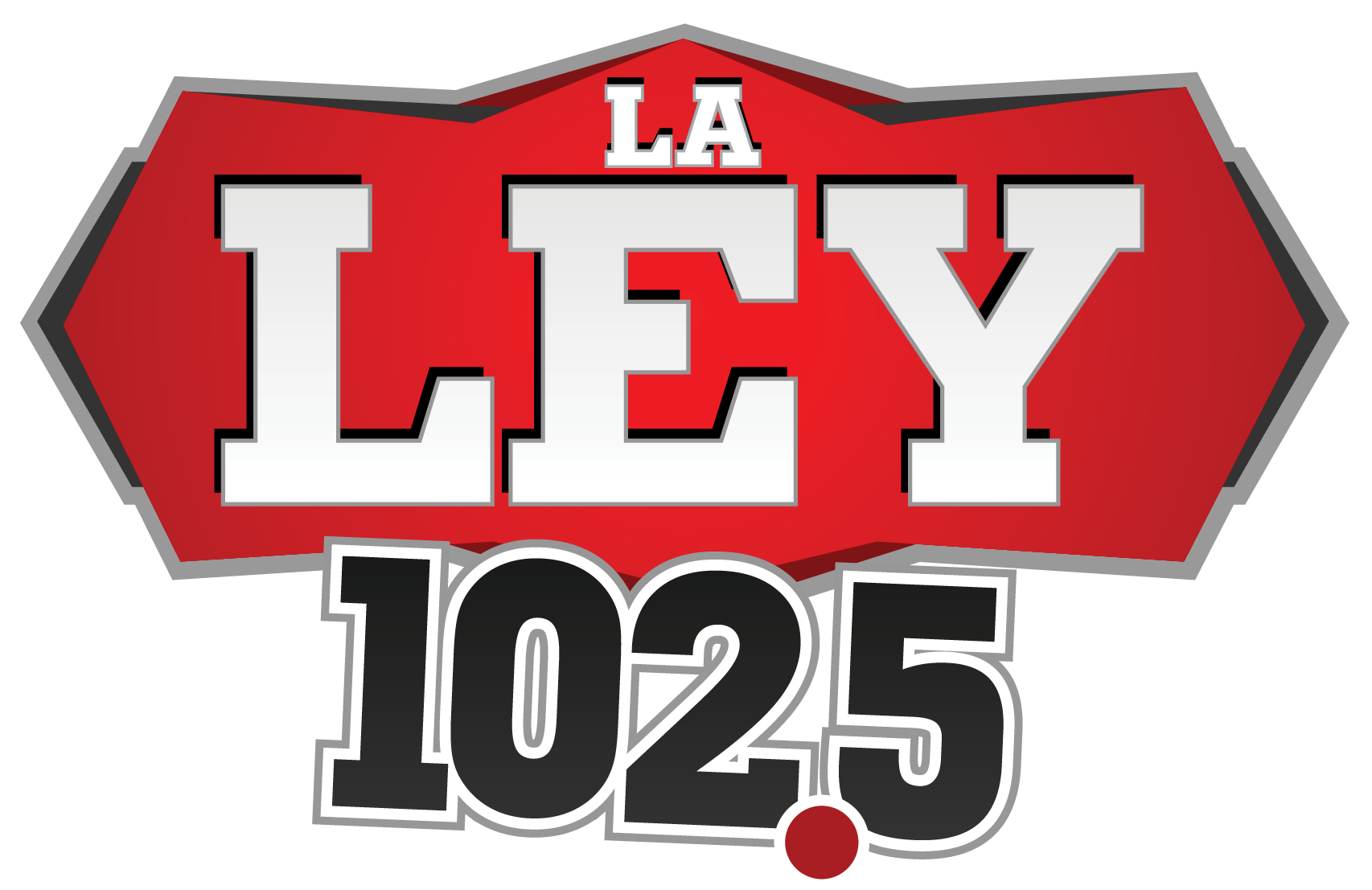
- Reynosa, Tamaulipas; Mexico
- Broadcast area: Rio Grande Valley
- Frequency: 102.5 MHz
- Branding: La Ley 102.5 FM

Programming
- Format: Regional Mexican

Ownership
- Owner: Radio United; (Radio Ultra, S.A. de C.V.)
- Sister stations: KURV; KBUC; XHCAO-FM; XHRYS-FM; XHAVO-FM;

History
- First air date: July 10, 1980 (concession)

Technical information
- Licensing authority: CRT
- Class: C1
- ERP: 45,000 watts
- HAAT: 150 meters (490 ft)
- Transmitter coordinates: 25°56′34.4″N 97°54′27.7″W

Links
- Webcast: Listen Live
- Website: clublaley1025.com

XHRR-FM (102.5 MHz) is a commercial radio station licensed to Reynosa, Tamaulipas, Mexico, and serving the Rio Grande Valley, Texas. It broadcasts a Regional Mexican radio format and is known as La Ley 102.5 FM.

While XHRR-FM is a Mexican radio station, it broadcasts from studios in Mission, Texas, and airs advertisements aimed at a U.S. audience. It is owned by Radio Ultra, S.A. de C.V. It had previously been simulcast with stations KESO and later KZSP on South Padre Island.

XHRR-FM has an effective radiated power (ERP) of 45,000 watts. Its transmitter is located in Prisciliano Delgado, Tamaulipas. Its signal covers several Texas cities including, McAllen, Brownsville and Edinburg.

== History ==
XHRR received its concession on July 10, 1980. It was owned by Romeo Flores Salinas. It had previously been affiliated with MVS Radio, carrying its FM Globo format until 2000 and Exa FM from 2000 to 2005.

In April 2019, R Communications sold the Radio United stations in Mexico, including XHCAO, XHAVO, and XHRR, to Radio Ultra, S.A. de C.V., a company owned by the Bichara family. The Federal Telecommunications Institute (IFT) approved the transfer on September 2, 2020.
