= Javier Villalobos =

American politician

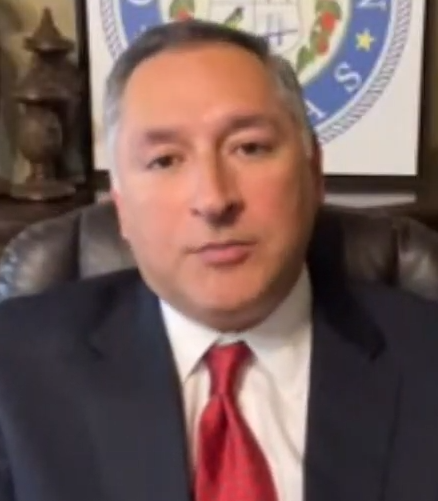

21st Mayor of McAllen
- Incumbent
- Assumed office June 14, 2021
- Preceded by: Jim Darling

Personal details
- Born: Javier Villalobos Crystal City, Texas, U.S.
- Party: Republican
- Education: Texas State University (BA); Thurgood Marshall School of Law (JD)
- Profession: Attorney

Javier Villalobos is an American attorney and politician who is the 21st and current mayor of McAllen, Texas. He won election in June 2021 and was sworn in on June 14, 2021.

== Education ==
Villalobos received a Bachelor of Business Administration in accounting from Southwest Texas State University, now Texas State University, and a Juris Doctor degree from the Thurgood Marshall School of Law.

== Career ==
Villalobos spent 26 years as an attorney in the areas of Criminal, Family, and Government/Administrative law. He served as chairman of the Hidalgo County GOP, provided legal advice to local governments and mounted an unsuccessful campaign for McAllen City Commission in 2015. He served as a City Commissioner for District 1 from 2018-2021 prior to being elected Mayor of McAllen. He ran for the Texas House of Representatives for House District 41 in 2008. In 2018, he was appointed by Governor of Texas Greg Abbott to the Prepaid Higher Education Tuition Board for a term set to expire February 1, 2023.
