= Richard Cortez (politician) =

American politician

Hidalgo County Judge
- Incumbent
- Assumed office January 1, 2019
- Preceded by: Ramon Garcia

19th Mayor of McAllen
- In office January 6, 2005 – January 6, 2013
- Preceded by: Leo Montalvo
- Succeeded by: Jim Darling

Personal details
- Born: Richard Cortez; November 10, 1943 (age 82) Mercedes, Texas, U.S.
- Party: Democratic
- Education: Pan American College (BBA)

Richard Cortez (born November 10, 1943) is an American politician who is the current County Judge of Hidalgo County, Texas. He was elected in November 2018.

== Biography ==
Richard Cortez grew up in Weslaco, Texas and graduated from Weslaco High School in 1962. He held multiple elected positions in the City of McAllen, Texas, the largest city in Hidalgo County, Texas. In 2004, Richard held the position of Vice Chairman of the McAllen Public Utility Board, a board entrusted with the water and sewer services for the City of McAllen. In June 2005, Richard Cortez was elected the 19th Mayor of the City of McAllen. He was re-elected for a second four-year term in May 2009, garnering 82 percent of the popular vote. Richard was elected McAllen City Commissioner-District 1 in 2015 and continued to serve until he gave up his seat to run for Hidalgo County Judge.

In 2018, after three terms as Hidalgo County Judge, Ramon Garcia did not seek re-election. Cortez became the nominee for the Democratic Party and defeated Republican Jane Cross with 72% of the vote or 106,745 votes to Cross with 28% of the vote or 42,331 votes. On January 1, 2019, Richard Cortez took office as Hidalgo County Judge.
