= South Texas Health System McAllen =

Coordinates: 26.1867°N 98.2258°W

Geography
- Location: 301 W. Expressway 83, McAllen, TX, United States

Services
- Emergency department: Level I trauma center
- Beds: 441

History
- Opened: 1985

Links
- Website: southtexashealthsystemmcallen.com
- Lists: Hospitals in the United States

South Texas Health System McAllen is a hospital in McAllen, Texas, United States. It is the flagship hospital of the South Texas Health System. It is owned by Universal Health Services, a Pennsylvania-based hospital management company.

McAllen is a tertiary care regional provider. It offers advanced wound care, maternity care including a Neonatal Intensive Care Unit (NICU), neurosurgery, comprehensive stroke unit, orthopedics, and oncology. It is the designated advanced Level I Trauma Center for Hidalgo County. Since 2011 it has been the base for emergency helicopter service throughout the Rio Grande Valley. In cooperation with the University of Texas Health Science Center at San Antonio, McAllen offers a three-year residency in Family Practice.

In a 2015 peer-reviewed study ranking the United States' most expensive hospitals, the South Texas Health System, which owns McAllen, was ranked as the 48th most expensive, charging roughly 9.2 times the amount procedures cost. This figure is disputed by STHS.

== History ==
South Texas Health System McAllen was established in 1985 by merging three pre-existing hospitals: McAllen Municipal Hospital (in operation since 1919), McAllen General Hospital, and McAllen Methodist Hospital. In 2022 South Texas Health System McAllen reached Level 1 Trauma Center status.

== Recognition ==
South Texas Health System McAllen has won several awards in the years it has been operating. It was named Rio Grande Valley Hispanic Chamber Hospital of the Year in 2011. Its maternity ward has won awards such as recognition as a Texas Ten-Step facility in 2013 and 2015 for promoting breast feeding, and recognition from the March of Dimes for reducing elective inductions and c-sections prior to 39 weeks.

== Hospital rating data ==
The HealthGrades website contains the clinical quality data for South Texas Health System McAllen, as of 2017. For this rating section three different types of data from HealthGrades are presented: clinical quality ratings for thirty-three inpatient conditions and procedures and thirteen patient safety indicators. There was no data for the percentage of patients giving the hospital as a 9 or 10 (the two highest possible ratings).

For inpatient conditions and procedures, there are three possible ratings: worse than expected, as expected, better than expected. For this hospital the data for this category is:

- Worse than expected - 1
- As expected - 22
- Better than expected - 10

For patient safety indicators, there are the same three possible ratings. For this hospital safety indicators were rated as:

- Worse than expected - 1
- As expected - 10
- Better than expected - 2

Percentage of patients rating this hospital as a 9 or 10 - not given. Percentage of patients who on average rank hospitals as a 9 or 10 - 69%
