= McAllen Convention Center =

Convention Center in McAllen, Texas

Coordinates: 26.200931°N 98.259321°W

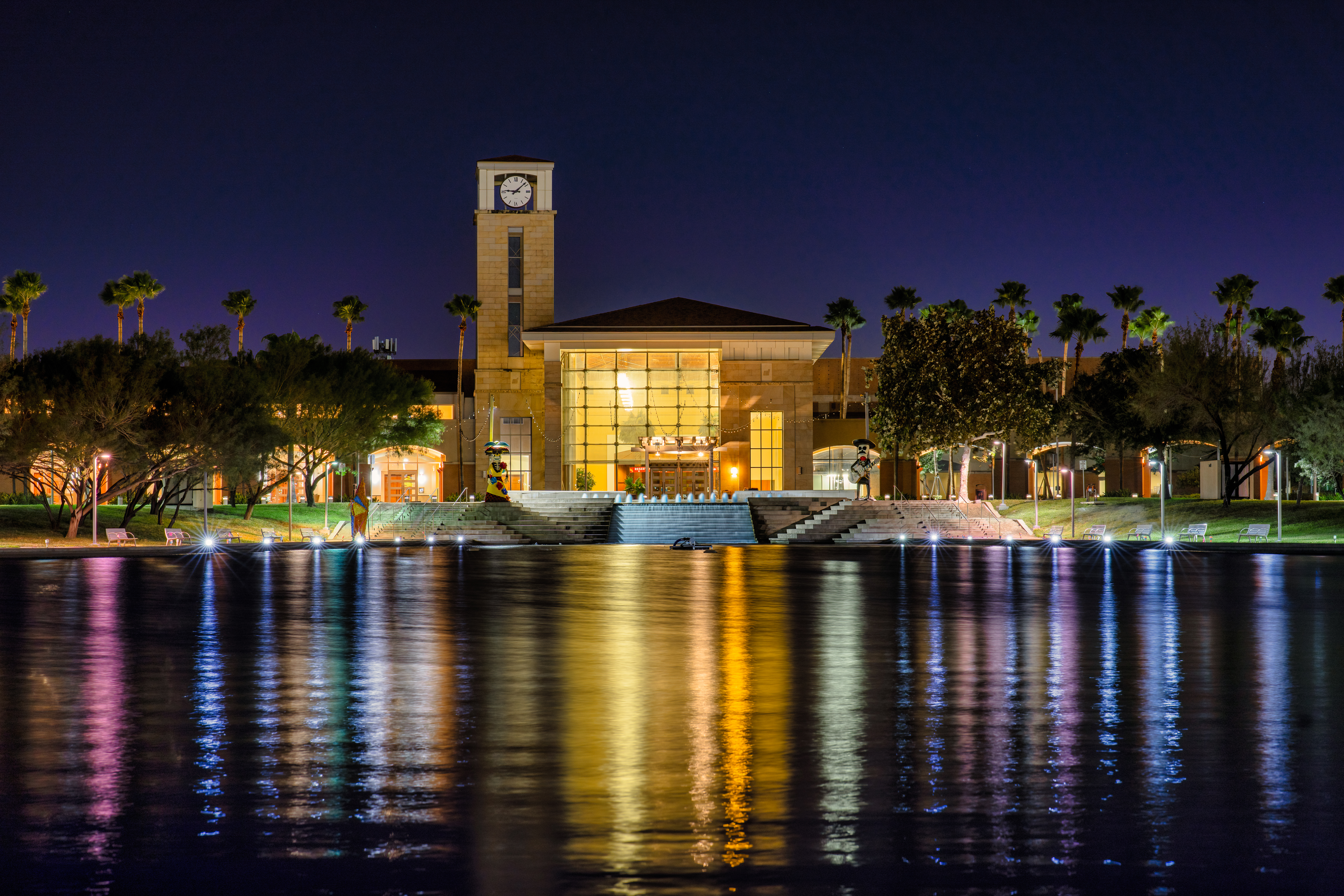
- View from Central Area
- Interactive map of McAllen Convention Center
- Address: 700 Convention Center Blvd; McAllen, TX 78501
- Owner: City of McAllen

Construction
- Opened: 2007
- Construction cost: $50 million

Tenants
- Rio Grande Valley Silverados (CBA) (2007–2008)

Website
- Venue Website

The McAllen Convention Center is a 174,000-square-foot (16,200 m^{2}) multi-purpose convention center in McAllen, Texas, USA with a seating capacity of 3,500. Having opened in 2007, it hosts locals sporting events and concerts. It was home to the Continental Basketball Association's Rio Grande Valley Silverados, who played only one season in 2007-08 before leaving to become the Southeast Texas Mavericks.
