= XHVTH-FM =

Radio station in Matamoros, Tamaulipas, Mexico

- Matamoros, Tamaulipas; Mexico
- Broadcast area: Rio Grande Valley
- Frequency: 107.1 MHz
- Branding: La Comadre

Programming
- Format: Variety hits

Ownership
- Owner: Multimedios Radio; (La Voz de Linares, S.A.)
- Sister stations: XHRYS-FM; XHAAA-FM; XHVTV-TDT;

History
- First air date: October 17, 1990 (concession)

Technical information
- Licensing authority: CRT
- Class: C1
- ERP: 100,000 watts
- HAAT: 264.82 m (868.8 ft)
- Transmitter coordinates: 25°56′33″N 97°54′25″W

Links
- Webcast: Listen live
- Website: mmradio.com

XHVTH-FM (is a radio station on 107.1 FM) is a Variety hits radio station that serves the Matamoros, Tamaulipas/Brownsville, Texas border area. It broadcasts from the Multimedios Radio tower at El Control, Tamaulipas.

== History ==
XHVTH received its concession on October 17, 1990, a month after signing on air. It has always been owned by Multimedios.
