= KJAV =

Radio station in Alamo, Texas

Coordinates: 26.217°N 98.090°W

- Alamo, Texas; United States
- Broadcast area: Rio Grande Valley
- Frequency: 104.9 MHz
- Branding: 104.9 The Ridge

Programming
- Format: Christian Contemporary and Smooth Jazz

Ownership
- Owner: Christian Ministries of the Valley, Inc
- Sister stations: XHCHL-FM Monterrey

History
- First air date: 1980
- Former call signs: KJAV (1980–2011); KRIO-FM (2011)
- Call sign meaning: K JAck FM Valley (former branding), Earlier it meant King James Authorized Version, a Bible reference.

Technical information
- Licensing authority: FCC
- Facility ID: 51957
- Class: A
- ERP: 6,000 watts
- HAAT: 98.9 meters (324 ft)

Links
- Public license information: Public file; LMS
- Website: liferadio1049.com

KJAV (104.9 FM, "104.9 The River") is a listener-supported radio station licensed to Alamo, Texas, and serving the Rio Grande Valley. The station was acquired by Christian Ministries of the Valley, Inc in 2023, and broadcasts a Smooth jazz and Christian Contemporary radio format.

== History ==
=== Original Christian radio format ===
This station received its original construction permit from the Federal Communications Commission on October 9, 1979. The new station was assigned the KJAV call sign by the FCC on January 14, 1980. KJAV received its license to cover from the FCC on October 23, 1980. In 1987, KJAV was sold to La Radio Cristiana Network, a network of Spanish-language Christian radio stations owned by evangelist and musician Paulino Bernal. La Radio Cristiana Network sold the station to BMP Radio for a recorded $7 million in 2004.

=== Rhythmic oldies ===
After the station was purchased by BMP Radio, the KJAV transitioned to a rhythmic oldies format, rebranding as "Jammin 104.9 The Valley's Old School". The station had a morning show on weekdays with Tony Fornia and then played music with no disc jockeys afterward. In August 2007, the station announced that it would soon change formats accompanied by the R.E.M. song "It's the End of the World as We Know It (And I Feel Fine)" just before starting every commercial break.

=== Jack FM ===
In mid-September 2007, the station changed formats to Jack FM. In 2009, Jack FM began broadcasting the games of the NBA Development League's Rio Grande Valley Vipers.

Between February 17, 2011 and March 3, 2011, KJAV's call sign was changed to KRIO-FM. The station's sign was changed back to KJAV in March 2011. In 2013, BMP sold the station along with five sister stations to MBM Texas Valley LLC for a purchase price of $2.5 million; the station was sold for $2.2 million to Bi-Media, LLC, in 2015. Following the purchase by Bi-Media, KJAV rebranded as Ultra 104.9.

=== New Christian radio format ===
In July 2018, KJAV was sold to Pastor Sergio Villarreal for $918,000. In June 2023, Christian Ministries of the Valley, Inc. purchased the station for $1.45 million. On November 1, 2023, KJAV changed their format from Spanish-language adult contemporary to Contemporary Christian music, rebranding as "Life Radio 104.9".

=== Flips to Smooth Jazz ===
KJAV added the Format since KZSP Love 95.3 South Padre Island rebranding known as 104.9 The Ridge on April 16, 2026, with a primarily instrumental music torched the Rio Grande Valley. as well new-age, chill, downtempo Smooth Jazz all over the valley.
