= H-1A visa =

Discontinued US visa program for foreign nurses

The H-1A visa was a visa that was previously available to foreign nationals seeking temporary employment in the United States. These visas were made available to foreign nurses coming into the United States to perform services as a registered nurse in areas with a shortage of health professionals as determined by the Department of Labor. The creation of this visa was prompted by a nursing shortage.

The H-1A nurse program, enacted by the Nursing Relief Act of 1989, expired on September 1, 1995. The last H-1A visas were issued in Fiscal Year 2000. The visa was succeeded by the H-1C visa, created in 1999. The H-1C program expired in 2009.

== Program details ==
This non-immigrant/temporary worker classification was introduced by the United States Citizenship and Immigration Services in 1989 to specifically address the lack of nurses in the United States.

=== Eligibility ===
All H visas require an offer of employment from a U.S. employer, and proof that the wage to be paid is comparable to other positions in that occupation.

To qualify for an H-1A visa, one must submit:

- an offer of employment from a U.S. employer
- proof that the wage to be paid is comparable to other positions in that occupation
- a showing (by the employer) that there were no qualified U.S. workers available and willing to fill the position.

=== Application ===
The Form I-129, Petition for a Nonimmigrant Worker, must be filed by a U.S. employer hospital that has received a notice of acceptance of the attestation for H-1A Nonimmigrant Nurses from the United States Citizenship and Immigration Services.

The Form I-129 must include the following documents:

- INS filing fee
- The original INS form G-28 (Notice of Entry of Appearance and Attorney) signed by petitioner or beneficiary
- INS Form I-129 with H supplement
- A copy of the Department of Labor's notice of acceptance for attestation for the facility on Form ETA 9029
- A statement that the facility will comply with the terms of attestation
- A statement describing limitations which the laws of the state or jurisdiction of intended employment place on the nurses
- A statement that notice of the filing provided by the employer to the bargaining Representative or to the RN, through posting
- The CGFNS certificate and/or the RN license for the state of intended employment
- A copy of the beneficiary's nursing license, from the country where nursing education was achieved
- A copy of the beneficiary's nursing diploma/degree

== Limitations ==
Temporary visas in the H classification are subject to numerical limitations imposed by Congress. These annual limits are applied at the time of Form I-129 approval, not when somebody seeks admission to the United States.

There were several restrictions placed on this visa during its implementation and valid period:

- The employment of the alien will not adversely affect the wages and working conditions of registered nurses similarly employed and the alien.
- The alien must be paid at the prevailing wage for registered nurses employed by the facility.
- The period of admission for an initial period shall not exceed 3 years, subject to an extension, not to exceed a total period of admission of 5 years.
- Visa may be revoked by the Secretary of Labor upon finding that the facility for which the nursing certification is made no longer meets such qualifications or if there are misrepresentations in certification.
- The employer must also employ other registered nurses.

== History ==
Prior to 1989, there was a single H-1 category used for skilled workers, with no separate category for nurses.

On March 20, 1989, Chuck Schumer sponsored the Immigration Nursing Relief Act in the United States House of Representatives as H.R. 1507. It was introduced again to the House and Senate on September 13, 1989. The Act was passed on December 18, 1989, by the 101st United States Congress as P.L. 101–238. The Act had two main parts:

1. It provided for the adjustment to permanent resident status of certain nonimmigrants who, as of September 1, 1989, had H-1 nonimmigrant status as registered nurses; who had been employed in that capacity for at least 3 years; and whose continued nursing employment meets certain labor certification requirements.
2. It created a new temporary category (H-1A) for registered nurses. It also reassigned the existing H-1 category to H-1B.

The H-1A category was permitted to sunset on September 1, 1995, with some nurses granted extensions in the category through September 30, 1997. On November 12, 1999, the category was replaced by the newer, more restrictive, H-1C visa. The last H-1A visas were issued in Fiscal Year 2000.

The H-1C category expired in December 2009, with the last H-1C visas issued in Fiscal Year 2012.

== Statistics ==
Below are H-1A visas issued each year as released by the U.S. Department of State's Bureau of Consular Affairs. Years here are fiscal years, so for instance the year 1993 refers to the time period from October 1, 1992, to September 30, 1993. A "N/A" indicates that data is not available; this is because country-level data became available only starting from Fiscal Year 1997.

Year	Total number of visas issued	Number of visas issued to each country
1990	2	N/A
1991	7443	N/A
1992	7377	N/A
1993	6388	N/A
1994	6441	N/A
1995	7261	N/A
1996	1745	N/A
1997	61	32 in Philippines, 4 in South Africa, 3 in Nigeria, 2 in Australia, 2 in mainland China, 2 in India, 1 in Marshall Islands, 1 in Niger, 1 in Norway, 1 in Panama, 1 in Saint Vincent and the Grenadines, 1 in the United Kingdom, 1 in Zimbabwe, 2 unknown
1998	18	3 in mainland China, 3 in Spain, 2 in South Africa, 1 in Australia, 1 in Chile, 1 in Greece, 1 in India, 1 in Pakistan, 1 in Philippines, 1 in Slovakia, 1 in the United Kingdom, 1 in Venezuela
1999	5	1 in mainland China, 1 in Croatia, 1 in France, 1 in Mexico, 1 in Senegal
2000	2	1 in Colombia, 1 in Germany

== See also ==
- H-1B visa
- TN visa
- H-1C visa
