= XHRYS-FM =

Radio station in Reynosa, Tamaulipas, Mexico

- Reynosa, Tamaulipas; Mexico
- Broadcast area: Rio Grande Valley
- Frequency: 90.1 MHz
- Branding: Ultra 90.1 FM

Programming
- Format: Contemporary hit radio

Ownership
- Owner: Multimedios Radio; (Radio Informativa, S.A. de C.V.)
- Operator: Radio United
- Sister stations: KURV; KBUC; XHCAO-FM; XHAVO-FM; XHRR-FM; XHAAA-FM; XHVTH-FM;

History
- First air date: August 10, 1988 (concession)
- Call sign meaning: "Reynosa"

Technical information
- Licensing authority: CRT
- Class: C1
- ERP: 82,500 watts
- HAAT: 2.2 m (7 ft 3 in)
- Transmitter coordinates: 25°56′33″N 97°54′25″W

Links
- Webcast: Listen live
- Website: https://www.ultra901.com

XHRYS-FM (90.1 MHz) is a radio station in Reynosa, Tamaulipas, Mexico. It broadcasts from the Multimedios tower at El Control, Tamaulipas.

== History ==
XHRYS received its concession on August 10, 1988 and always been owned by Multimedios Radio through subsidiary, Radio Informativa S.A. The Radio Recuerdo romantic format had previously broadcasting on XHAAA-FM, moving to XHRYS. XHRYS-FM initially adopted the Radio Recuerdo romantic format in the late 1980s or early 1990s, relocating it from its sister station XHAAA-FM in Reynosa, where the format had originated as a ballad pop and memory music offering. This move allowed Multimedios Radio to expand its romantic programming presence in the Rio Grande Valley market, catering to listeners seeking nostalgic Spanish-language ballads and classic love songs amid growing demand for such content in the border region. XHRYS-FM's previous formats reflect shifts in response to listener preferences and market dynamics in the Reynosa border region. In the mid-1990s, the station broadcast as Estereo Recuerdo, a nostalgia-driven format centered on classic Mexican romantic ballads, rancheras, and boleros that resonated with older demographics seeking cultural familiarity and emotional depth in their programming. This era emphasized timeless tracks from artists like Vicente Fernández and Pedro Infante, fostering a sense of community through music evoking personal memories and traditions, which helped build loyal listenership among mature audiences in Reynosa and nearby areas. In the 1990s, the station rebranded to Stereo Recuerdo, continuing its focus on romantic and recollection-based music while enhancing its stereo broadcasting capabilities to improve audio quality for local audiences. This period maintained the station's emphasis on emotional, evergreen hits until the early 2000s, when market shifts toward more upbeat programming prompted a transition. Later rebranding as Stereo Recuerdo until the early 2000s, it became Stereo Hits and rebranding Hits FM in 2011. By 2007, XHRYS-FM had evolved into Stereo Hits, incorporating contemporary hits and a broader mix of popular Spanish tracks to appeal to younger demographics in the competitive Rio Grande Valley radio landscape.The station transitioned to a contemporary hits format as Stereo Hits in the early 2000s, rebranding to Hits FM in 2011 while maintaining a mix of English and Spanish pop, rock, and urban hits to appeal to a broader, younger bilingual demographic along the U.S.-Mexico border. The programming incorporated dynamic elements such as Top 40 countdown segments and occasional spotlights on local talent, adapting to competitive pressures from other regional stations and evolving tastes in the Rio Grande Valley market. This evolution broadened the station's reach, attracting cross-border listeners with high-energy playlists featuring global hits, though specific listenership impacts varied amid format rivalries within the Multimedios network. The Hits FM branding persisted until late 2023, when operations shifted to a new partnership The hits-oriented direction solidified with the 2011 rebranding to Hits FM, which emphasized top-40 and current pop hits, further aligning the station with dynamic music trends and listener preferences in the area. Government records from 2008 confirm the Stereo Hits branding during this phase, reflecting its adaptation to regional entertainment demands. In December 2023, the station leased operations to US based Radio United, and Ultra 90.1 with a CHR format was launched. XHRYS-FM, operating as Ultra 90.1, adopted its current branding in December 2023 following a handover of operations to Radio United, shifting to a contemporary hit radio (CHR) format centered on "only good vibes" through rhythmic pop, hip-hop, and Top 40 music
