= KBUC =

American radio station in Raymondville, Texas

- Raymondville, Texas; United States
- Broadcast area: Rio Grande Valley; Matamoros and Reynosa, Tamaulipas, Mexico.
- Frequency: 102.1 MHz
- Branding: Super Tejano 102.1

Programming
- Format: Tejano

Ownership
- Owner: Radio United; (Leading Media Group Corp.)
- Sister stations: KURV, XHCAO-FM, XHRYS-FM, XHAVO-FM, XHRR-FM

History
- First air date: 1983
- Former call signs: KSOX-FM (1981–1999); KILM (1999–2005); KTFM (2005); KLEY-FM (2005)

Technical information
- Licensing authority: FCC
- Facility ID: 18654
- Class: C2
- ERP: 18,000 watts
- HAAT: 231 meters (758 ft)
- Transmitter coordinates: 26°38′9″N 97°50′10″W

Links
- Public license information: Public file; LMS
- Webcast: Listen Live
- Website: supertejano1021.com

KBUC (102.1 MHz) is a radio station broadcasting a tejano music format. Licensed to Raymondville, Texas, United States, the station serves the McAllen-Brownsville-Harlingen and Reynosa-Matamoros border area. The station is owned by Radio United, through licensee Leading Media Group Corp. The station has obtained a construction permit from the FCC for a power increase to 37,000 watts. KBUC also served as the flagship station for the Rio Grande Valley Killer Bees. KBUC formerly broadcast a country music format but flipped on August 15, 2011, at 5:00 p.m.

== History ==
The Federal Communications Commission issued a construction permit for the station to Sendero Multimedia, Inc. on December 15, 1980. The station was assigned the call sign KSOX-FM on November 16, 1981, and received its license to cover on April 21, 1983. On April 22, 1994, the station changed its call sign to KILM. The station's license and that of Mirando City, Texas-based KBDR were assigned by Sendero on April 3, 2003, to R Communications, LLC at a purchase price of $8,000,000. The station once more changed its call sign on January 19, 2005, to KTFM, on January 26, 2005, to KLEY-FM, and on February 2, 2005, to the current KBUC.

R Communications sold KBUC and three sister stations to Grupo Multimedios effective February 10, 2021, for $6 million.
