= XHAVO-FM =

Radio station in Río Bravo, Tamaulipas, Mexico

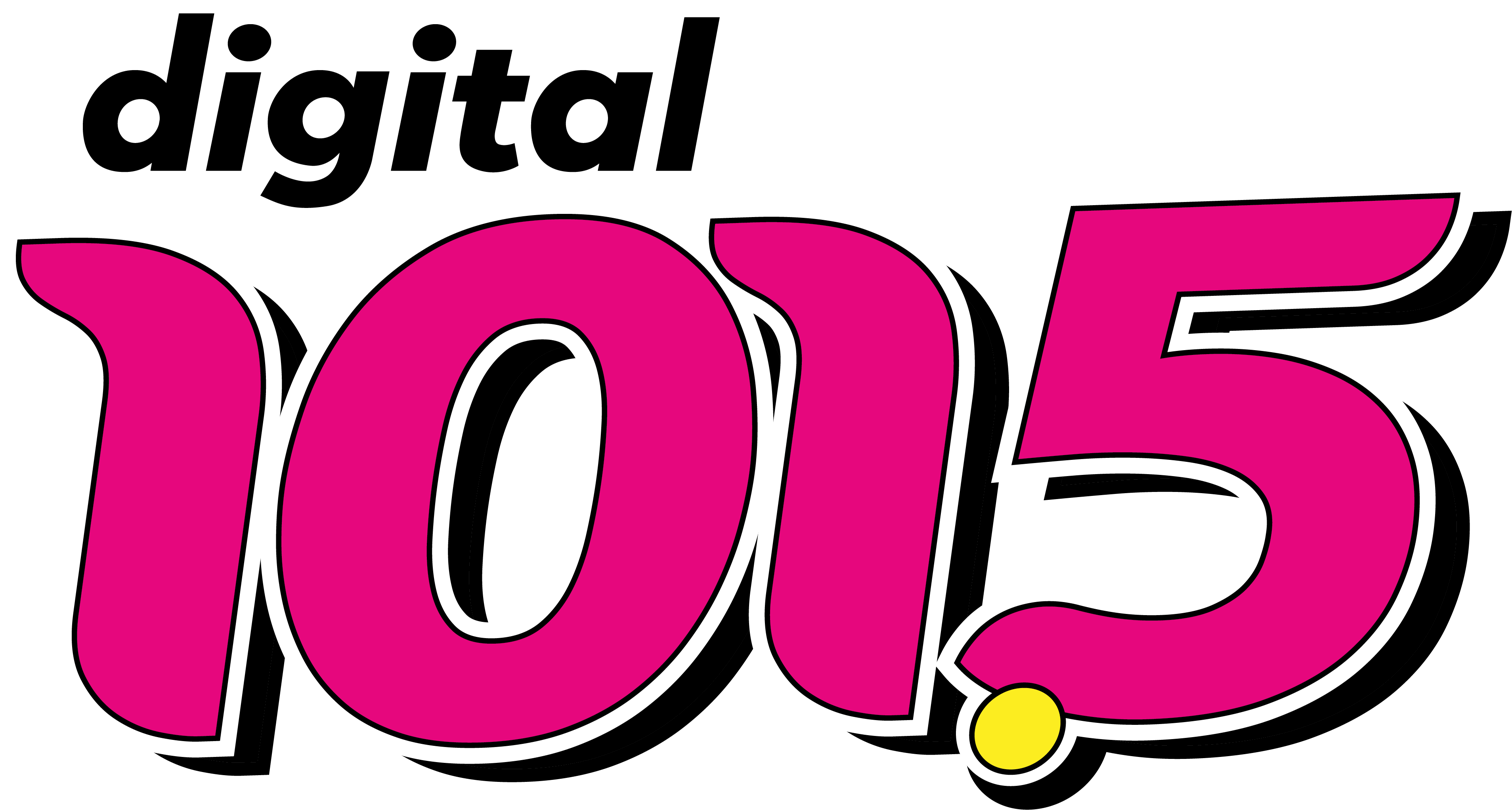
- Río Bravo, Tamaulipas; Mexico
- Broadcast area: Rio Grande Valley
- Frequency: 101.5 MHz
- Branding: Digital 101.5 FM

Programming
- Format: Contemporary hit radio

Ownership
- Owner: Radio United; (Radio Ultra, S.A. de C.V.)
- Sister stations: KURV; KBUC; XHCAO-FM; XHRYS-FM; XHRR-FM;

History
- First air date: February 22, 1992 (concession)
- Call sign meaning: Río Bravo

Technical information
- Licensing authority: CRT
- Class: C1
- ERP: 99,942 watts
- HAAT: −4.4 meters (−14 ft)
- Transmitter coordinates: 25°59′37″N 98°07′56.5″W

Links
- Webcast: Listen live
- Website: www.clubdigital1015.com

XHAVO-FM (101.5 MHz) is a radio station in Río Bravo, Tamaulipas, Mexico, serving Reynosa and the Rio Grande Valley, Texas. It is owned by Radio United and known as Digital 101.5.

== History ==
The concession for XHAVO was obtained by Edilberto Huesca Perrotín on February 22, 1992. In 1998, the station was sold to Grupo ACIR transmitting "La Comadre" with a Regional Mexican format and by the early 2000s it became Digital 101.5 with a CHR format. ACIR sold XHAVO to an affiliate of Border Media Partners in 2004, and when BMP sold its Rio Grande Valley stations, XHAVO was included in the sale to R Communications, LLC.

In April 2019, R Communications sold the Radio United stations in Mexico, including XHCAO, XHAVO, and XHRR, to Radio Ultra, S.A. de C.V., a company owned by the Bichara family. The Federal Telecommunications Institute (IFT) approved the transfer on September 2, 2020.
