= KZSP =

Radio station in South Padre Island, Texas

Coordinates: 26°03′13″N 97°12′46″W

- South Padre Island, Texas; United States
- Broadcast area: Rio Grande Valley
- Frequency: 95.3 MHz

Ownership
- Owner: Radio United (formerly R Communications, LLC); (MBM Texas Valley LLC)

History
- First air date: 1989
- Last air date: December 8, 2021
- Former call signs: KESO (1989–1990)
- Call sign meaning: South Padre

Technical information
- Facility ID: 56473
- Class: A
- ERP: 2,900 watts
- HAAT: 128.4 meters (421 ft)

KZSP (95.3 FM) was a radio station licensed to South Padre Island, Texas, United States, and was last owned by MBM Texas Valley LLC.

MBM Texas Valley surrendered KZSP's license to the Federal Communications Commission on December 8, 2021, who cancelled it the same day.

KZSP last broadcast days were broadcast from transmitter at the MBM RESIDENCE South Padre Island
