= Ixtepec Airport =

Airport in the Istmo Region, Oaxaca, Mexico

Ixtepec Airport Aeropuerto de Ixtepec
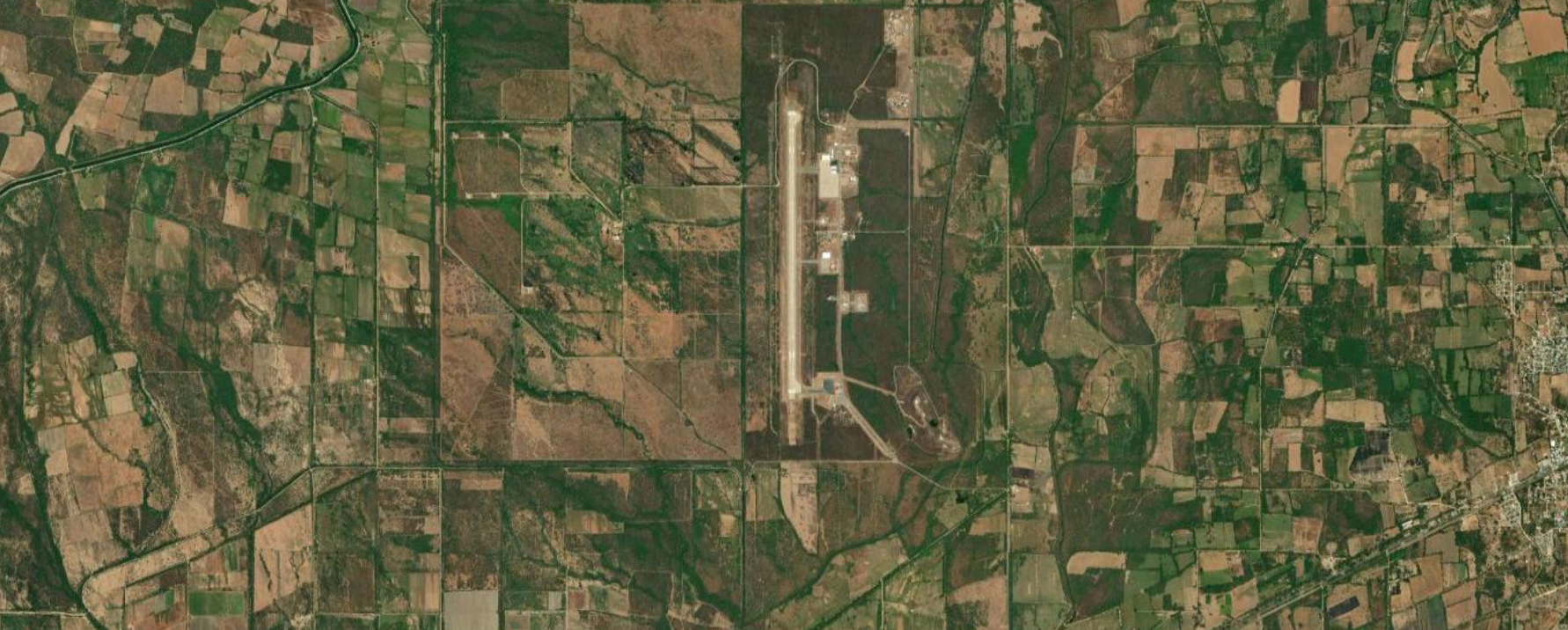
- IATA: IZT; ICAO: MMIT

Summary
- Airport type: Military/Public
- Operator: Grupo Olmeca-Maya-Mexica (GAFSACOMM)
- Serves: Istmo Region of Oaxaca, Mexico (including Juchitán, Salina Cruz, Tehuantepec, and Ixtepec
- Location: Asunción Ixtaltepec, Oaxaca, Mexico
- Time zone: CST (UTC−06:00)
- Elevation AMSL: 31 m (102 ft)
- Coordinates: 16°26′47″N 095°05′37″W
- Website: www.grupomundomaya.com/IZT

Map
- Location of airport in Oaxaca IZT (Mexico)

Runways
Direction	Length		Surface
Direction	m	ft	Surface
18/36	2,330	7,644	Asphalt

Statistics (2025)
- Total passengers: 18,306
- Ranking in Mexico: 55th
- Source: Olmeca-Maya-Mexica; Agencia Federal de Aviación Civil

Ixtepec Airport (Spanish: Aeropuerto de Ixtepec) (IATA: IZT, ICAO: MMIT) is an airport located in Asunción Ixtaltepec, Oaxaca, Mexico. Serving as Air Force Base No. 2 for the Mexican Air Force, it functions not only as a military facility but also facilitates commuter flights within Oaxaca. Additionally, it supports general aviation activities for the Istmo Region, encompassing cities such as Juchitan, Salina Cruz, Tehuantepec, and Ixtepec in Oaxaca. Since 2023, Grupo Olmeca-Maya-Mexica (GAFSACOMM), a holding company owned by the Mexican military, has been managing the airport. Alternative larger airports include Huatulco International Airport, located 145 kilometres (90 mi) to the west of Ixtepec, and Oaxaca International Airport, situated 185 kilometres (115 mi) to the northwest of Ixtepec. In 2025, the airport served 18,306 passengers.

== History ==
The first flight in the Isthmus of Tehuantepec region happened on May 28, 1935, during Juchitán's patron saint festivities. The airbase was built during World War II, alongside the Cozumel Airport. Mexicana de Aviación took over the military field after the war in 1945, managed by the operator Industrias y Terrenos. Operations shifted back to the federal government in 1949, transforming it into a Mexican Air Force Base by 1950.

In its history, the airport has predominantly operated as an Air Force Base, maintaining this role even after notable developments in 2017. During that year, a substantial investment of approximately 300 million Mexican pesos (around 17 million USD) was made to develop facilities suitable for civilian use. Passenger services commenced that year, marked by Aeromar's inaugural flight from Mexico City to Ixtepec on April 26, 2017. Aeromar continued operations until it declared bankruptcy in 2023.

== Facilities ==
The airport is situated at an elevation of 31 metres (102 ft) above mean sea level, featuring a single asphalt runway, designated as 18/36, measuring 2,330 metres (7,640 ft). The commercial aviation apron has the capacity for two narrow-body aircraft and features additional stands for general aviation. The passenger terminal caters to both domestic arrivals and departures in a single-story small building. It includes a check-in area, a security checkpoint, an arrivals hall with baggage claim facilities and a departure concourse with direct access to the apron, allowing passengers to board their planes by walking to the aircraft.

The majority of the airport grounds are occupied by Air Force Base No. 3 (Spanish: Base Aérea Militar No. 3 Ixtepec) (B.A.M. No. 3). This base is the home of the 402nd Air Squadron, operating T-6 Texan II aircraft, and the first surveillance squadron, utilizing C-26 and Embraer ERJ-145 aircraft. Adjacent facilities include hangars for civil aviation, administration offices, housing units, a hospital, and other amenities for accommodating Air Force personnel.

== Airlines and destinations ==
=== Passenger ===
Airlines	Destinations
Aerotucán	Oaxaca
Mexicana de Aviación	Mexico City–Felipe Ángeles

=== Destinations map ===
Domestic destinations from Ixtepec Airport
Red = Year-round destination
Blue = Future destination
Green = Seasonal destination

== Statistics ==
=== Annual Traffic ===
Passenger statistics at IZT
Year	Air operations	change %	Cargo (t)	change %	Total passengers	change %
2017	398	Steady	49	Steady	17,426	Steady
2018	1,384	▲247.74%	23	▼52.53%	39,835	▲128.60%
2019	1,300	▼6.07%	25	▲8.44%	36,296	▼8.88%
2020	638	▼50.92%	12	▼52%	12,368	▼65.92%
2021	396	▼37.93%	13	▲0.08%	6,778	▼45.19%
2022	410	▼3.54%	8	▼38.46%	7,696	▲13.54%
2023	154	▼166.23%	0	▼100%	1,366	▼82.25%
2024	710	▲361.04%	1	▲	15,222	▲1,007.03%
2025	580	▼18.31%	0	▼	18,306	▲20.26%

== See also ==
- List of the busiest airports in Mexico
- List of airports in Mexico
- List of airports by ICAO code: M
- List of busiest airports in North America
- List of the busiest airports in Latin America
- Transportation in Mexico
- Tourism in Mexico
- Istmo de Tehuantepec
- Juchitán District
- Tehuantepec District
- Economy of Oaxaca
