= Oaxaca International Airport =

International airport in Oaxaca, Mexico

Oaxaca International Airport Aeropuerto Internacional de Oaxaca
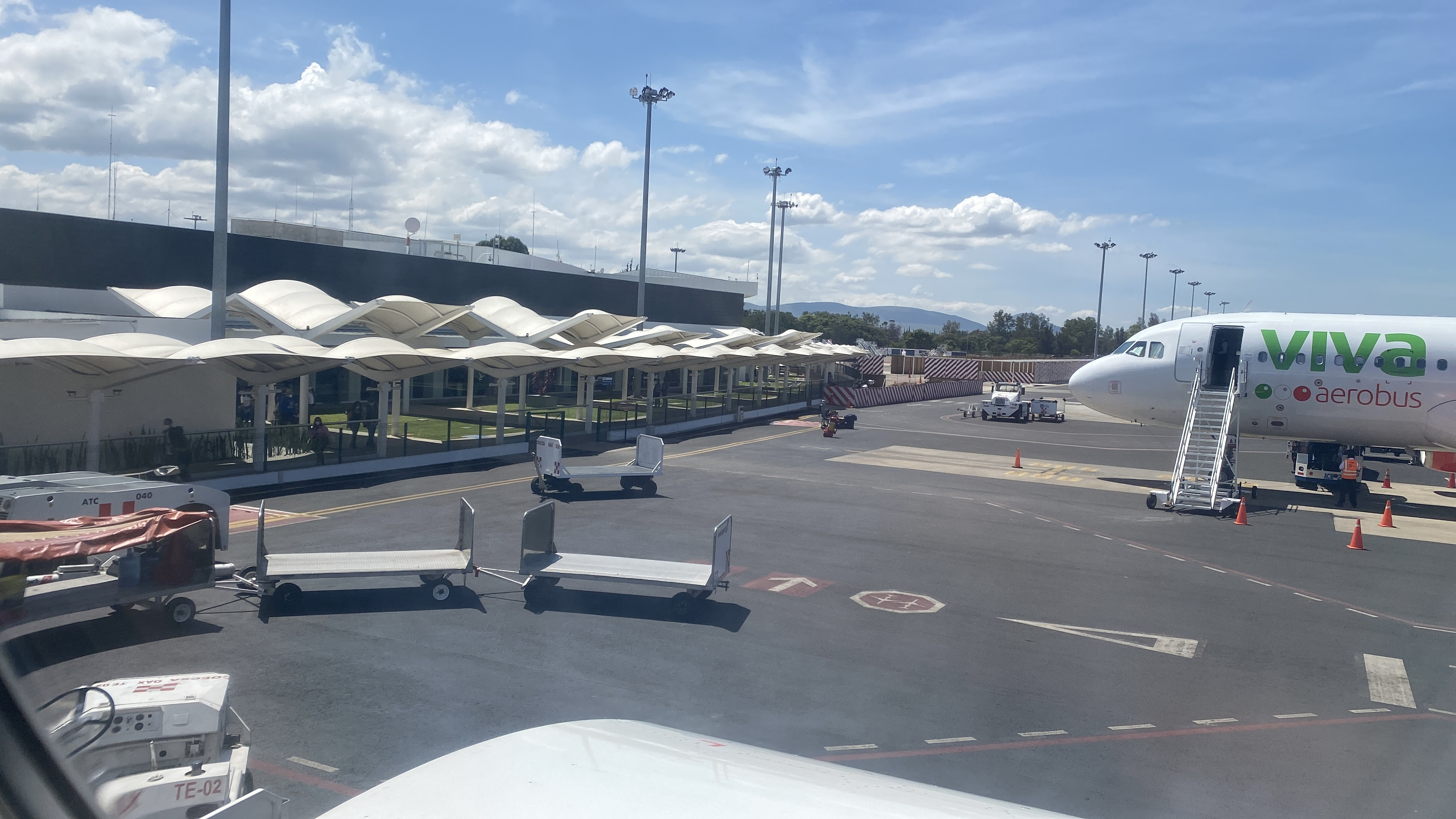
- IATA: OAX; ICAO: MMOX

Summary
- Airport type: Military/Public
- Owner/Operator: Grupo Aeroportuario del Sureste
- Serves: Oaxaca, Oaxaca, Mexico
- Location: Santa Cruz Xoxocotlán, Oaxaca, Mexico
- Hub for: Aerotucán
- Time zone: CST (UTC−06:00)
- Elevation AMSL: 1,521 m (4,990 ft)
- Coordinates: 17°0′0″N 96°43′36″W
- Website: www.asur.com.mx/Contenido/Oaxaca

Map
- Location of the airport in Oaxaca OAX (Mexico)

Runways
| Direction | Length | | Surface |
| Direction | m | ft | Surface |
|---|---|---|---|
| 01/19 | 2,450 | 8,038 | Asphalt |

Statistics (2025)
- Total passengers: 1,864,967
- Ranking in Mexico: 18th ▼1
- Source: Grupo Aeroportuario del Sureste

Oaxaca International Airport (IATA: OAX, ICAO: MMOX) (Spanish: Aeropuerto Internacional de Oaxaca), officially Xoxocotlán International Airport, is an international airport located in the municipality of Santa Cruz Xoxocotlán, a southern suburb of Oaxaca City, Oaxaca. It handles national and international air traffic for the Metropolitan Area of Oaxaca and a significant portion of the State of Oaxaca. The airport is operated by Grupo Aeroportuario del Sureste (ASUR) and derives its name from the Nahuatl word "xocotl," meaning "sour or sweet and sour fruit."

The airport serves as the hub for the regional airline Aerotucán and offers passenger services for both domestic and international destinations. Additionally, it hosts military facilities for the Mexican Army, logistics and courier companies, and supports various aviation-related activities, such as tourism, flight training, executive, and general aviation. Oaxaca Airport has experienced rapid growth, mainly due to the popularity of the area as a tourist destination. It served 1,787,428 passengers in 2024, and 1,864,967 passengers in 2025.

== Facilities ==
The airport is situated at an elevation of 1,521 metres (4,990 ft) above mean sea level and is equipped with a single runway designated as 01/19. This runway is 2,450 metres (8,040 ft) in length and features an asphalt surface. The commercial aviation apron provides nine stands mainly designed for narrow-body aircraft. The general aviation apron offers parking for fixed-wing aircraft and heliports for private aviation. The airport has the capacity to handle up to 22 operations per hour.

The passenger terminal is a single-story building with a total area of 7,548 square metres (81,250 sq ft). It accommodates both arrivals and departures for domestic and international flights. The departures area features a check-in area, a security checkpoint, and a departure concourse featuring a VIP lounge, snack bars, souvenir shops, and eight gates that provide direct access to the apron, allowing passengers to board their planes by walking to the aircraft through a series of open-air walkways. The arrivals section is located at the southern end of the terminal and includes customs and immigration facilities, a baggage claim area, and an arrivals hall with car rental services, taxi stands, snack bars, and souvenir shops.

Adjacent to the terminal, other facilities include civil aviation hangars, cargo and logistics and courier companies, and designated spaces for general aviation. The parking facility provides both short-term and long-term parking spaces.

Air Force Base No. 15 (Spanish: Base Aérea Militar No. 15 San Juan Bautista La Raya, Oaxaca) (BAM-15) is situated in the southern part of the airport. This Air Force Base features an apron measuring 5,950 square metres (64,000 sq ft), two hangars, and military facilities for Squadron 103, which currently operates Bell 212 aircraft.

== Airlines and destinations ==
=== Passenger ===
| Airlines | Destinations |
|---|---|
| Aeroméxico | Mexico City–Benito Juárez |
| Aeroméxico Connect | Mexico City–Benito Juárez, Mexico City–Felipe Ángeles |
| Aerotucán | Huatulco, Ixtepec, Puerto Escondido |
| Aerovega | Puerto Escondido |
| American Airlines | Dallas/Fort Worth |
| United Express | Houston–Intercontinental |
| Viva | Mexico City–Benito Juárez, Mexico City–Felipe Ángeles, Monterrey, Tijuana, Tuxtla Gutiérrez |
| Volaris | Cancún, Guadalajara, Los Angeles, Mérida, Mexico City–Benito Juárez, Querétaro, Tijuana |

=== Destination maps ===
Domestic destinations from Oaxaca International Airport
Red = Year-round destination
Blue = Future destination
Green = Seasonal destination
International destinations from Oaxaca International Airport
Red = Year-round destination
Blue = Future destination
Green = Seasonal destination

== Statistics ==
=== Annual Traffic ===
Passenger statistics at OAX
| Year | Total Passengers | change % |
|---|---|---|
| 2000 | 459,833 | Steady |
| 2001 | 440,178 | ▼4.27% |
| 2002 | 433,296 | ▼1.56% |
| 2003 | 461,013 | ▲6.39% |
| 2004 | 543,238 | ▲17.8% |
| 2005 | 563,656 | ▲3.75% |
| 2006 | 495,623 | ▼12.06% |
| 2007 | 514,038 | ▲3.71% |
| 2008 | 594,468 | ▲15.64% |
| 2009 | 523,104 | ▼12.0% |
| 2010 | 446,676 | ▼14.61% |
| 2011 | 401,320 | ▼10.15% |
| 2012 | 473,133 | ▲17.89% |
| 2013 | 510,345 | ▲7.86% |
| 2014 | 542,271 | ▲6.25% |
| 2015 | 663,187 | ▲22.29% |
| 2016 | 746,910 | ▲12.62% |
| 2017 | 862,286 | ▲15.4% |
| 2018 | 951,037 | ▲10.29% |
| 2019 | 1,196,245 | ▲25.8% |
| 2020 | 590,778 | ▼50.6% |
| 2021 | 913,937 | ▲54.7% |
| 2022 | 1,304,034 | ▲42.7% |
| 2023 | 1,693,042 | ▲29.8% |
| 2024 | 1,787,428 | ▲5.6% |
| 2025 | 1,864,967 | ▲4.3% |

=== Busiest routes ===
Busiest routes from OAX (Jan–Dec 2025)
| Rank | City | Passengers |
|---|---|---|
| 1 | Mexico City, Mexico City | 334,932 |
| 2 | Tijuana, Baja California | 159,229 |
| 3 | Monterrey, Nuevo León | 94,316 |
| 4 | Guadalajara, Jalisco | 87,578 |
| 5 | Mexico City/AIFA, State of Mexico | 56,089 |
| 6 | Dallas/Fort Worth, United States | 54,043 |
| 7 | Cancún, Quintana Roo | 53,812 |
| 8 | Los Angeles, United States | 30,015 |
| 9 | Houston–Intercontinental, United States | 23,491 |
| 10 | Mérida, Yucatán | 19,232 |

== See also ==
- List of the busiest airports in Mexico
- List of airports in Mexico
- List of airports by ICAO code: M
- List of busiest airports in North America
- List of the busiest airports in Latin America
- Transportation in Mexico
- Tourism in Mexico
- Grupo Aeroportuario del Sureste
- Economy of Oaxaca
- Oaxaca Valley
- Monte Albán, Mitla and Yagul
- Tehuacán-Cuicatlán Biosphere Reserve
