= Felipe Ángeles International Airport =

International airport serving Greater Mexico City

Felipe Ángeles International Airport Aeropuerto Internacional Felipe Ángeles

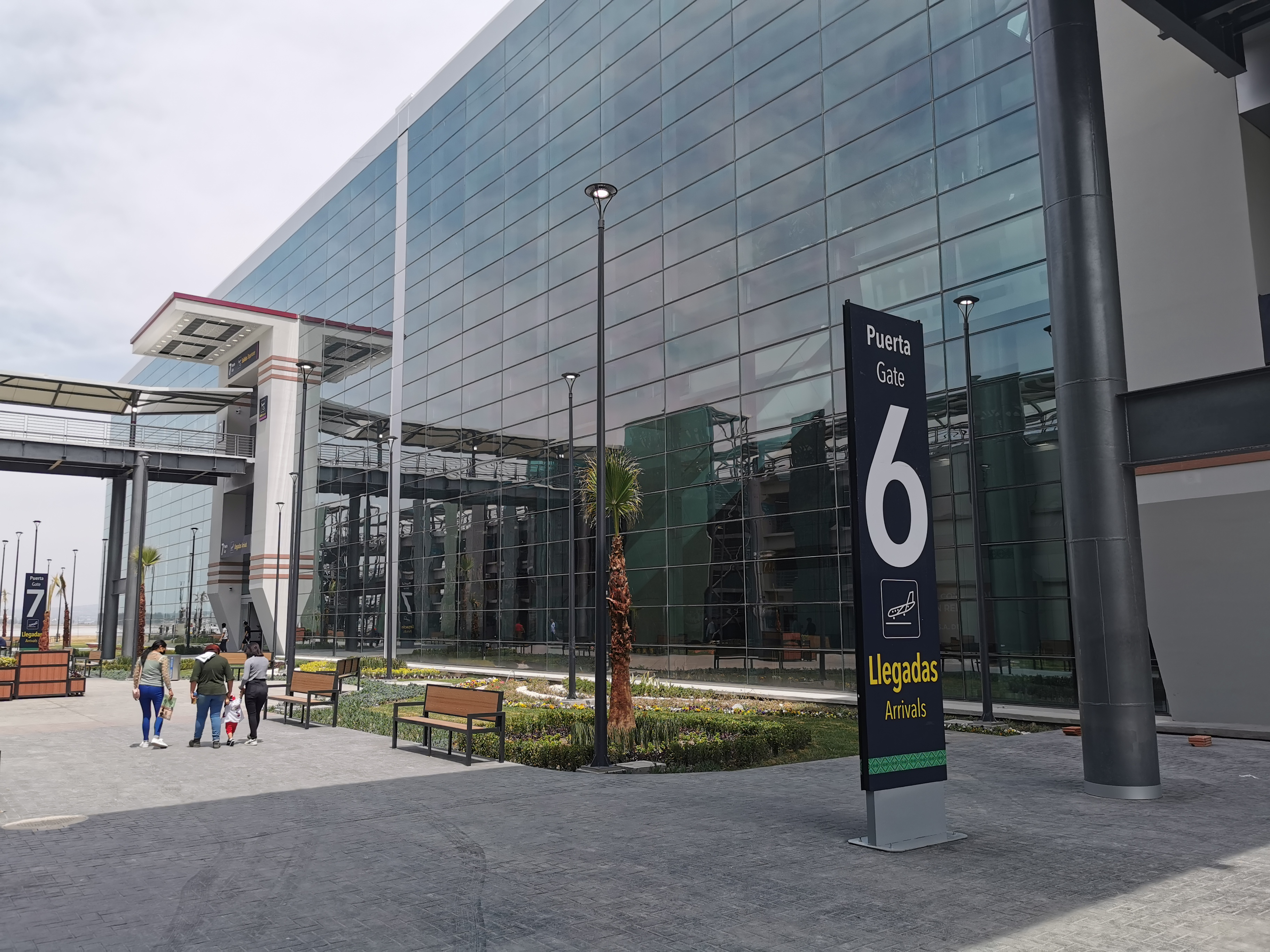
- IATA: NLU; ICAO: MMSM

Summary
- Airport type: Public / Military
- Owner: Mexican government
- Operator: SEDENA
- Serves: Greater Mexico City
- Location: Santa Lucía, Zumpango, State of Mexico, Mexico
- Opened: 21 March 2022; 4 years ago
- Hub for: Avianca Cargo México; mas; Mexicana de Aviación
- Focus city for: Aeromexico Connect
- Operating base for: Viva
- Time zone: CST (UTC-06:00)
- Elevation AMSL: 2,246 m (7,369 ft)
- Coordinates: 19°45′24″N 099°00′55″W
- Website: www.aifa.aero; www.gob.mx/aifa

Map
- Location of the airport in the State of Mexico NLU/MMSM (Mexico)

Runways
Direction	Length		Surface
Direction	m	ft	Surface
04R/22L	3,500	11,483	Concrete
04C/22C	4,500	14,764	Concrete
04L/22R	4,500	14,764	Concrete

Statistics (2025)
- Total passengers: 7,079,040
- Ranking in Mexico: 7th ▲1
- Sources: STV, AFAC

Felipe Ángeles International Airport (IATA: NLU, ICAO: MMSM), also known as Mexico City Felipe Ángeles International Airport or simply Mexico City-AIFA, is an international airport located in Zumpango, State of Mexico, 35 kilometres (22 mi) north of Mexico City. Originally named Santa Lucía Air Force Base, it opened for civilian use in 2022, serving as the third airport for Greater Mexico City, in addition to Mexico City International Airport and Toluca International Airport. The passenger terminal facilitates domestic and international flights, functioning as a focus city for Viva and Aeroméxico Connect as well as the main hub for the state-owned domestic airline Mexicana de Aviación. Apart from civilian operations, the airport accommodates the Mexican Air Force, general aviation, and charter flight services.

Owned by the Mexican government and operated by the Department of National Defense (SEDENA), the airport is named after General Felipe Ángeles, a significant figure in the Mexican Revolution. It is the second-largest airport by area in Mexico after Cancún International Airport, covering 1,531 hectares (3,780 acres). The airport served 7,079,040 passengers in 2025, a 11.5% increase from the previous year, becoming the 7th busiest in the country.

Mexico's largest air cargo hub, the airport has gained a prominent role following recent restrictions at the busier Mexico City International Airport. It now serves as the primary hub for the cargo airlines Avianca Cargo México, Mas Air, and Awesome Cargo. In 2025, it handled 406,192.74 tons of cargo.

== History ==
=== Background ===
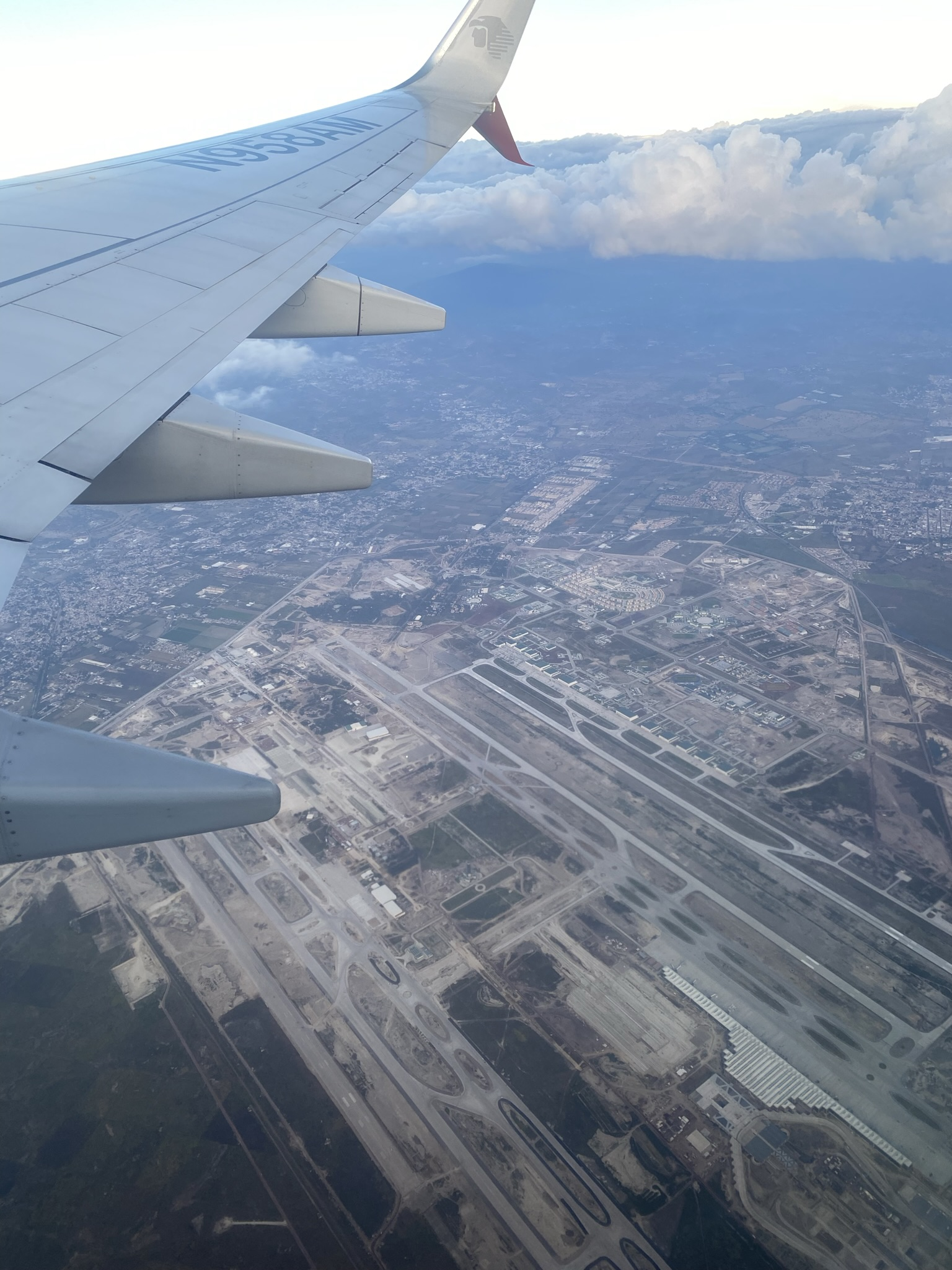
Aerial view of Felipe Ángeles Airport under construction

The Santa Lucía Air Force Base, established in 1952 to relocate the Balbuena Military Air Field, officially inaugurated its aerodrome on 24 November 1952, during Miguel Alemán´s administration. The complete transition of aircraft from Balbuena to Santa Lucía occurred in 1959. The aerodrome featured a runway measuring 3,780 metres (12,400 ft) in length and 75 metres (246 ft) in width, boasting the widest paved runway in Mexico at the time. It was named "General Alfredo Lezama Álvarez" in honor of its commander from 1961 to 1964.

Felipe Ángeles Airport's conversion as a civilian airport has been in response to congestion challenges at Mexico City International Airport, a longstanding topic in Mexican politics since the early 2000s. The older airport is constrained by its location in a densely populated area.

Large infrastructure projects in Mexico, notably in transportation, have historically been key elements of presidential legacies. This is due to centralized decision-making, their symbolic importance for progress, and the desire of leaders to leave a lasting impact. In 2002, President Vicente Fox unveiled an ambitious plan for a new, expansive airport on 5,000 hectares (12,000 acres) of land in the municipalities of Atenco and Texcoco. This proposal aimed to address the congestion issues at Mexico City International Airport and meet the growing demands of air travel. However, the Atenco project faced significant opposition and controversy, particularly from the Community Front in Defense of Land (Spanish: Frente del Pueblo en Defensa de La Tierra, FPDT), an organization representing locals who would be displaced by the airport's construction. The protests against the project culminated in violent clashes, leading to the cancellation of the new airport.

In 2014, President Peña Nieto reignited plans for a major airport infrastructure project with the announcement of the Texcoco Airport. Positioned as Mexico's most significant public infrastructure undertaking in a century, the Texcoco Airport was designed to replace the aging Mexico City International Airport by 2023. Faced with mounting opposition and controversy, President López Obrador, then a presidential candidate, campaigned against the ongoing Texcoco Airport construction.

=== Controversy ===
The new Mexico City Airport quickly became a focal point of intense and conflicting political discourse in Mexico, reflecting a broader ideological clash within the country regarding economic models and governance strategies.

Upon winning the presidency, López Obrador fulfilled his campaign promise to reassess the Texcoco airport. He initiated a referendum in the first half of October 2018, organized by the Arturo Rosenblueth Foundation and a group of citizens. This referendum aimed to measure public opinion on whether to complete the Texcoco Airport or proceed with the Santa Lucía expansion. However, the process faced criticism for lacking official validity and not adhering to established legal procedures. Controversy also arose over potential challenges in accurately interpreting the results.

Despite the controversy, the referendum took place, and the results favored the construction of the Santa Lucía project. A significant majority of participants (69.95%) voted in favor of Santa Lucía, while a smaller percentage (29.08%) supported the continuation of the Texcoco project. Although the informal nature of the survey raised some controversy, it influenced the decision to proceed with the Santa Lucía airport. Subsequently, López Obrador's administration moved forward with the expansion of the Santa Lucía air base into an airport, officially named Felipe Ángeles International Airport.

=== Construction ===
Construction started on 17 October 2019, following the lifting of multiple judicial suspensions against the project, primarily due to environmental and cultural study concerns and lack of transparency. The relocation and resizing of military facilities, including the runway, apron, and hangars, were undertaken to align with the specifications of the new civilian airport.

During construction, an accident occurred involving 22 workers, resulting in minor injuries. This incident took place when workers opted for a crane-type vehicle as their mode of transportation. The construction period coincided with the COVID-19 pandemic, leading to infection among at least four employees, along with 37 suspected cases and three deaths as of 9 June 2020, despite efforts to enforce social distancing and other preventive measures.

The terminal area's construction unearthed remains of at least 200 mammoths in the former Lake Xaltocan. Authorities confirmed that the findings did not warrant a halt in the airport project. Mexican architect Francisco González Pulido and military general Gustavo Vallejo oversaw the airport's design. Groupe ADP managed the master plan, and airspace navigability studies were conducted by Airbus subsidiary NAVBLUE. The first phase, completed as scheduled, included two runways and a new terminal.

Felipe Ángeles International Airport (AIFA) commenced operations on 21 March 2022, with Viva launching the first commercial passenger flight arriving from Guadalajara. Subsequently, Conviasa initiated the airport's first international flight to Caracas, Venezuela. The airport ventured into cargo operations on 1 September 2022, with AeroUnion's cargo flight arriving from Tijuana.

== Facilities ==
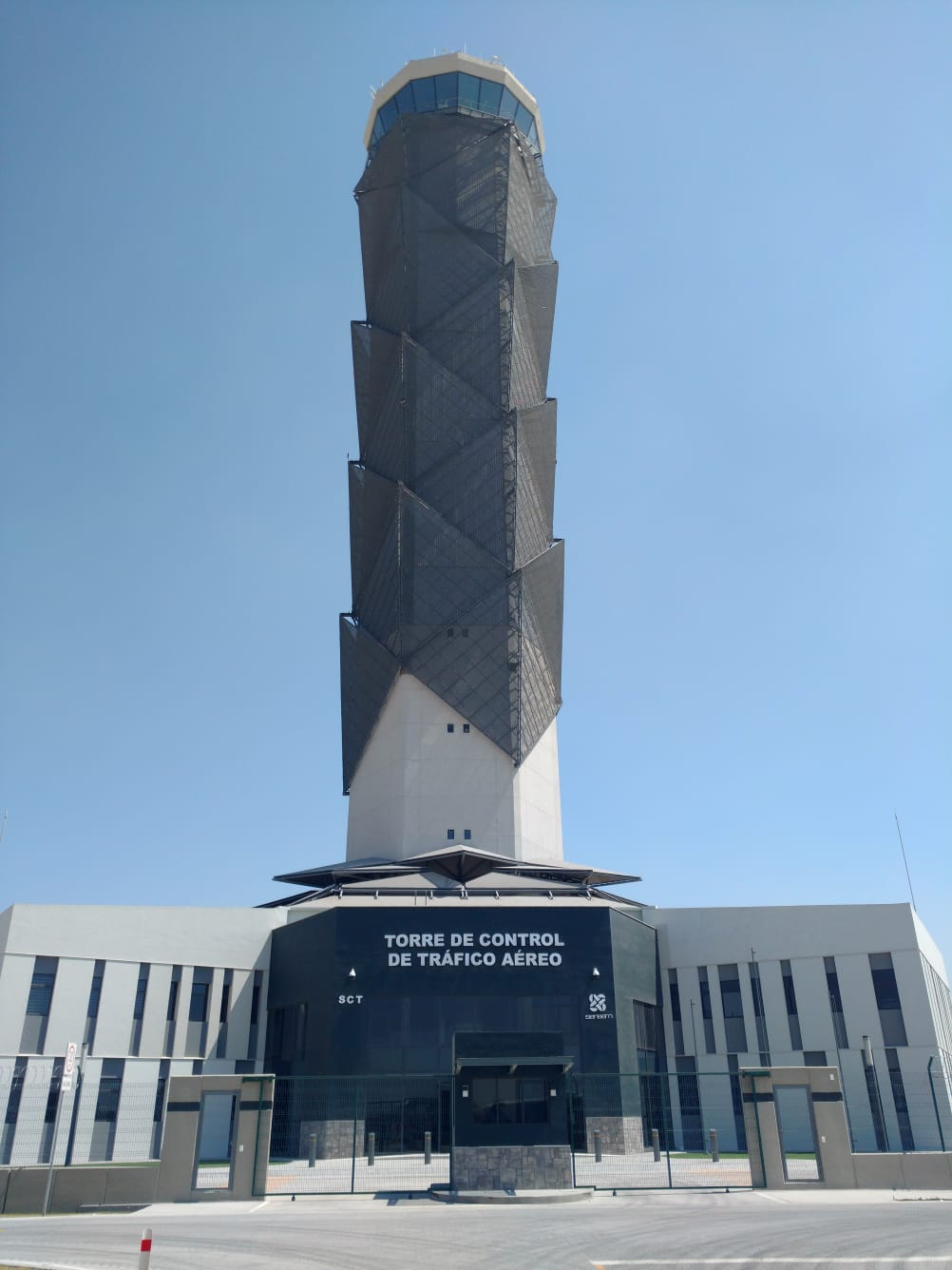
Control tower of the airport

The airport covers 1,531 hectares (3,780 acres) and is situated at an elevation of 2,246 metres (7,369 ft) above mean sea level. With a capacity to handle 20 million passengers annually, it is equipped to accommodate wide-body aircraft, including the Boeing 787 and 747. Notably, the Mexico City airspace is the first in the country to utilize the performance-based navigation system (PBN). This allows simultaneous operations at Felipe Ángeles International Airport, Mexico City International Airport, and Toluca International Airport without one airport's operations impeding those of the others.

=== Runways ===
Recognized as a "hot and high" airport, Felipe Ángeles Airport boasts the longest runways in the country and the second-longest commercial runway in North America, following a 4,900 metres (16,100 ft) runway at Denver International Airport. Setting it apart, it is one of the few airports in Mexico equipped with three runways, alongside those in Chihuahua and Tampico. Although the Department of National Defense (SEDENA) declared that the civilian runways at Felipe Ángeles Airport would feature a CAT III precision approach system, during the joint publication of official aerodrome information with the Department of Infrastructure, Communications, and Transportation (SICT) and SENEAM, on 16 December 2021, the ILS system was officially declared as CAT I for the airport's inauguration, allowing for simultaneous operations.

Runways at Felipe Ángeles International Airport
Number	Length	Width	ILS	Use
04L/22R	4,500 metres (14,800 ft)	45 metres (148 ft)	CAT I¹	civil
04C/22C	4,500 metres (14,800 ft)	45 metres (148 ft)	CAT I	civil
04R/22L	3,500 metres (11,500 ft)	45 metres (148 ft)	VFR	military
~~04/22 (west of 04L/22R)~~	~~3,000 metres (9,800 ft)~~	~~75 metres (246 ft)~~	~~VFR~~	~~military~~

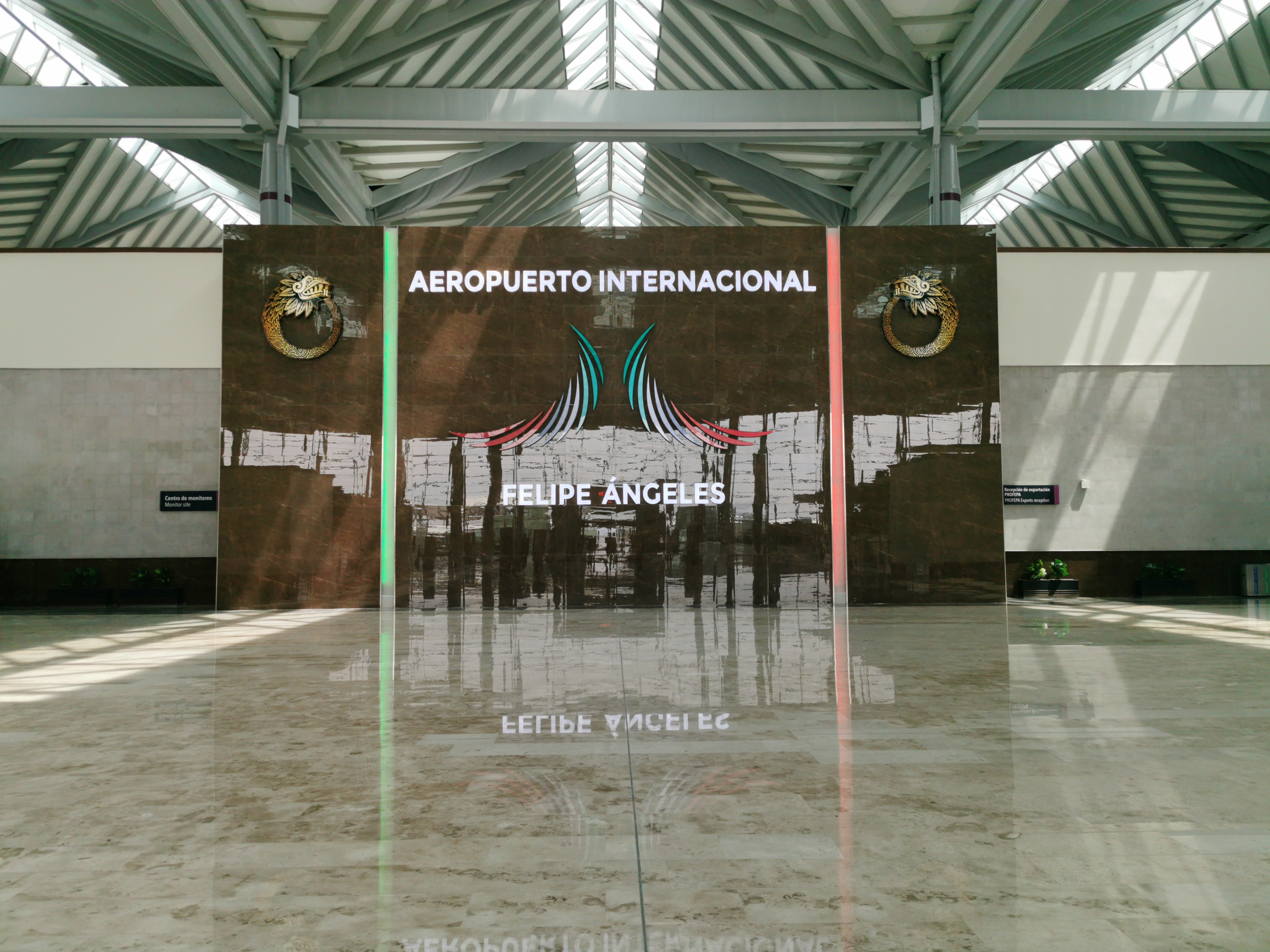
The main hall at the passenger terminal

Over 28 kilometres (17 mi) of asphalt concrete taxiways facilitate the movement of aircraft around the airfield. These taxiways have a standard width of 23 metres (75 ft), featuring 7 metres (23 ft) of heavy-duty shoulders and 7 metres (23 ft) of erosion control pavement on each side. The airport stands out as the only one in Mexico, as of 2023, to utilize painted markings, lighted signage, and embedded pavement lighting as visual aids.

The primary apron, named the "East apron," is constructed of hydraulic concrete and offers parking positions for 29 narrow-body aircraft or a combination of 12 wide-body and 5 narrow-body aircraft. Additionally, the "central apron" provides parking for 5 wide-body or 10 narrow-body aircraft adjacent to the terminal, along with 6 remote positions. In total, there are 45 parking positions available, accommodating either narrow-body aircraft exclusively or a combination of 17 wide-body and 11 narrow-body aircraft.

=== Terminal ===
The passenger terminal at Felipe Ángeles Airport accommodates both arrival and departure services for domestic and international flights within a multi-story building parallel to runway 04C/22C. The check-in area features 100 conventional counters, 86 self-service kiosks, 20 drop-off counters, and a space for future growth, covering 5,410 square metres (58,200 sq ft). Security check areas include 22 X-ray security belts and 6 additional belts for future expansion, across 4,740 square metres (51,000 sq ft). The departures concourse is a 1,080 metres (3,540 ft) long, 29,100 square metres (313,000 sq ft) structure with 34 gates.

- Gates 101-105 are located in the south portion of the concourse on the ground floor with direct access to the apron, allowing passengers to board their planes by walking to the aircraft.
- Gates 106-119 are equipped with dual jetbridges, offering flexibility for either a single wide-body aircraft using both jetbridges or simultaneous boarding/disembarking for two narrow-body aircraft. Each gate has a paired identification (i.e., 106A, 106B)
- Gates 120-134 are bus gates.

The baggage claim area, covering an initial phase of 13,015 square metres (140,090 sq ft), incorporates three carousels for national baggage and four for international baggage, with an additional four carousels designated for future expansion. The airport also includes 1,312 square metres (14,120 sq ft) of VIP lounges, encompassing the VIPort Lounge, The Grand Lounge Elite, and Salón Hacienda Santa Lucía. Adjacent to the terminal, the Ground Transportation Terminal (Spanish: Terminal Intermodal de Transporte Terrestre, TITT), centrally located, hosts essential transportation services, such as a Suburban train and a bus station, organized within a six-level structure:

- Suburban Train Level (−9.35 metres (−30.7 ft)): Two platforms accommodating up to 1,138 users.
- Basement 2 Level (−7.60 metres (−24.9 ft)): 920 long-stay parking spaces.
- Basement 1 Level (−3.80 metres (−12.5 ft)): 896 long-stay parking spaces.
- Level 0: 435 short-stay parking spaces, a Suburban train ticketing area, a Bus terminal, and a Mexibús terminal.
- Level 1 (+3.50 metres (11.5 ft)): 716 short-stay parking spaces.
- Level 2 (+7 metres (23 ft)): 1,058 short-stay parking spaces and entrance to the arrivals hall at the passenger terminal.
- Level 3 (+10.50 metres (34.4 ft)): Plaza Mexicana and entrance to the check-in area at the passenger terminal.

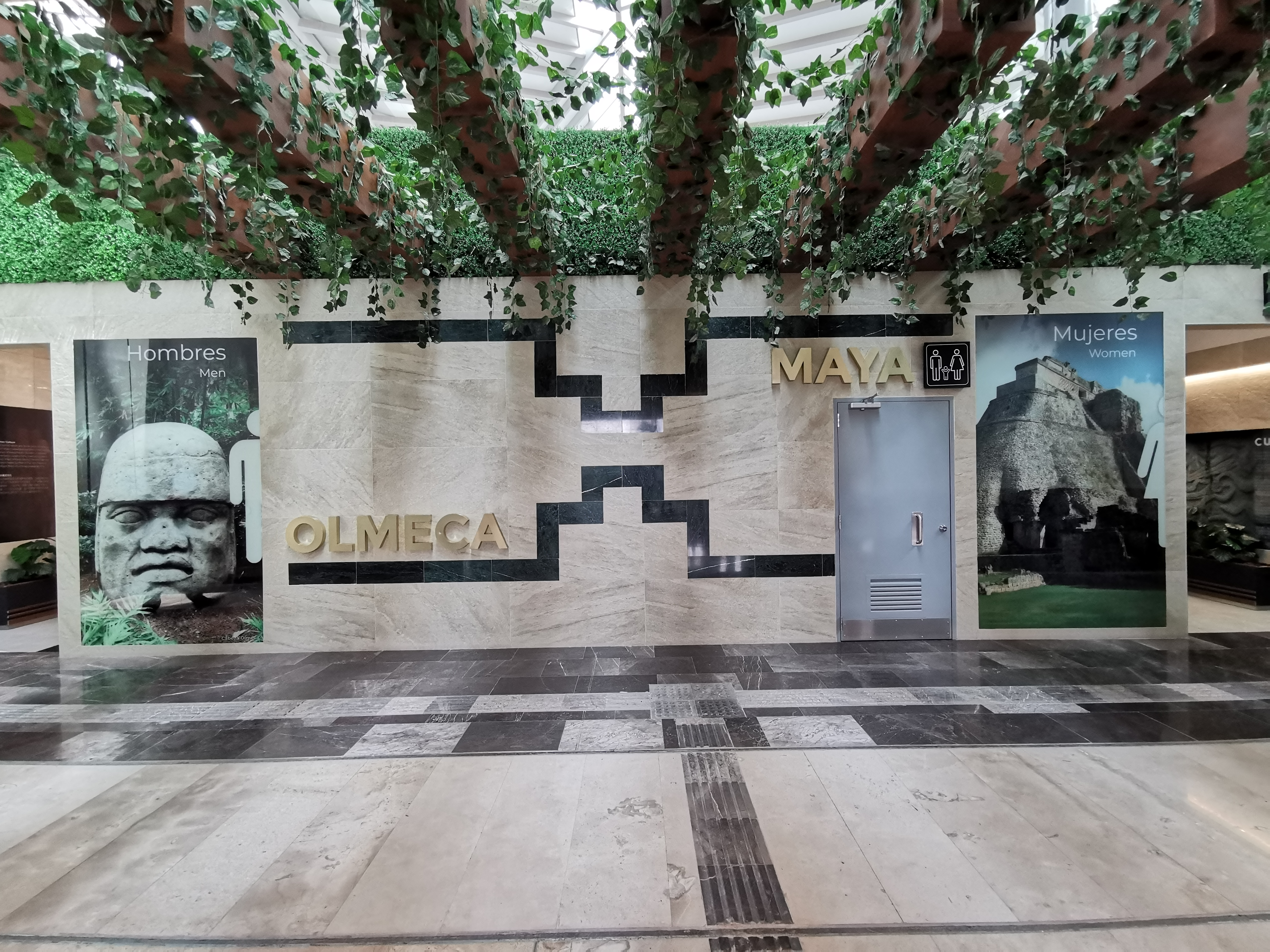
Departures concourse

=== Cargo ===
The cargo complex features a hydraulic concrete apron with six positions for wide-body aircraft, five of which can adapt to accommodate two narrow-body aircraft simultaneously. It encompasses three clusters of facilities: The first one is an airside area where activities revolve around airline cargo operations and ground handling services provided by regulated warehouses spanning 252,900 square metres (2,722,000 sq ft). Beyond the controlled area, a second set of facilities includes offices for customs agencies, branches of courier companies, and banking units, covering an area of 72,500 square metres (780,000 sq ft). The surrounding areas are designed for an industrial and logistics complex. By July 2023, cargo operations were scheduled to cease at Mexico City International Airport, following a government decree.

=== Other facilities ===
The General Aviation Building (FBO) is designated for general/non-commercial aviation or private jets. The terminal offers services for the convenience of passengers during their private flights, including a pilots' lounge and a passenger lounge. Adjacent to this facility is a general aviation apron, providing stands for fixed-wing aircraft and heliports for private aviation, as well as hangars and maintenance facilities.

Felipe Ángeles Airport features a unique cultural corridor designed for both transit passengers and local residents. According to authorities, this is the first cultural passageway of its kind in the country. The corridor houses three museums open to the public from Tuesday to Sunday, between 09:00 and 16:00:

- Mammoth Museum: Officially known as Santa Lucía Quinametzin Paleontological Museum, it was established to preserve, exhibit, and research approximately 200 mammoth remains discovered during the airport's construction.
- Military Aviation Museum: With 12 exhibition galleries and 4 temporary displays, this museum showcases the history of Mexican military aviation through its collection of 50 aircraft.
- Historic Railcar and Cultural Historical Train Museum: Created from railcars that served the Department of National Defense (SEDENA) and subsequently restored, including the "Francisco I. Madero" car, "Jalisco" car (used as a cafeteria), and "Adolfo Ruíz Cortines" car (reading room). Additionally, a replica of the old Santa Lucía station is on display.

== Airlines and destinations ==
=== Passenger ===
Airlines	Destinations
Aeroméxico	Cancún
Aeroméxico Connect	Durango, Guadalajara, Mérida, Monterrey, Oaxaca, Puerto Vallarta, Veracruz
Aerus	Ciudad Victoria, Tampico
Arajet	Punta Cana, Santo Domingo–Las Américas
Conviasa	Caracas
Mexicana de Aviación	Acapulco, Campeche, Chetumal, Chihuahua, Ciudad Victoria, Guadalajara, Hermosillo, Ixtapa/Zihuatanejo, Ixtepec, León/Bajío, Mazatlán, Mérida, Monterrey, Palenque, Puerto Vallarta, San José del Cabo, Tijuana, Tulum, Tuxtla Gutiérrez, Zacatecas
Viva	Acapulco, Aguascalientes, Bogotá, Cancún, Cartagena, Chetumal, Chihuahua, Ciudad Juárez, Ciudad Obregón, Culiacán, Guadalajara, Havana, Hermosillo, Huatulco, Ixtapa/Zihuatanejo, La Paz, León/Bajio, Manzanillo, Matamoros, Mazatlán, Medellín–JMC, Mérida, Monterrey, Nuevo Laredo, Oaxaca, Puerto Escondido, Puerto Vallarta, Reynosa, Saltillo, San José del Cabo, San Luis Potosí, Tampico, Tepic, Tijuana, Torreón/Gómez Palacio, Tulum, Tuxtla Gutiérrez, Veracruz, Villahermosa
Volaris	Bogotá, Cancún, Ciudad Juárez, Culiacán, Guadalajara, La Paz, Mérida, San José del Cabo, Tijuana; Seasonal: Aguascalientes

=== Cargo ===
Airlines	Destinations
Air Canada Cargo	Montréal-Trudeau, Toronto–Pearson
Atlas Air	Anchorage, Chicago–O'Hare, Cincinnati, Halifax, Honolulu, Houston–Intercontinental, Huntsville, Indianapolis, Liège, Medellín–JMC, Miami, Quito, Santiago de Chile, Zaragoza
Awesome Cargo	Los Angeles, Zhengzhou
China Southern Cargo	Harbin, Los Angeles, Shanghai–Pudong, Shenzhen
DHL Aviation	Cincinnati, Guadalajara, Guatemala City, Los Angeles
Emirates SkyCargo	Copenhagen, Dubai–Al Maktoum, Frankfurt, Guadalajara, Houston–Intercontinental, Los Angeles, Quito, Zaragoza
Ethiopian Airlines Cargo	Addis Ababa
Lufthansa Cargo	Chicago–O'Hare, Dallas/Fort Worth, Frankfurt, Guadalajara, New York–JFK, Monterrey
Mas Air	Hangzhou
MSC Air Cargo	Anchorage, Indianapolis, Liege
Qatar Airways Cargo	Ostend/Bruges,
Turkish Cargo	Istanbul
UPS Airlines	Louisville

=== Destinations map ===
Domestic destinations from Felipe Ángeles International Airport
Red = Year-round destination
Blue = Future destination
Green = Seasonal destination
International destinations from Felipe Ángeles International Airport
Red = Year-round destination
Blue = Future destination
Green = Seasonal destination

== Statistics ==
=== Busiest Routes ===
Busiest domestic routes from NLU (Jan–Dec 2025)
Rank	City	Passengers
1	Cancún, Quintana Roo	486,367
2	Monterrey, Nuevo León	324,376
3	Guadalajara, Jalisco	324,240
4	Mérida, Yucatán	269,501
5	Tijuana, Baja California	234,290
6	Tulum, Quintana Roo	173,583
7	Puerto Escondido, Oaxaca	104,254
8	Puerto Vallarta, Jalisco	103,137
9	Los Cabos, Baja California Sur	88,854
10	Oaxaca, Oaxaca	67,056

Busiest international routes from NLU (Jan–Dec 2025)
Rank	City	Passengers
1	Bogotá, Colombia	54,062
2	Punta Cana, Dominican Republic	39,541
3	Houston–Intercontinental, United States	24,855
4	Santo Domingo–Las Américas, Dominican Republic	24,611
5	McAllen, United States	19,983
6	Havana, Cuba	16,401
7	Caracas, Venezuela	14,436
8	Panama City, Panama	648
9	San Antonio, United States	444
10	Austin, United States	47

== Ground transportation ==
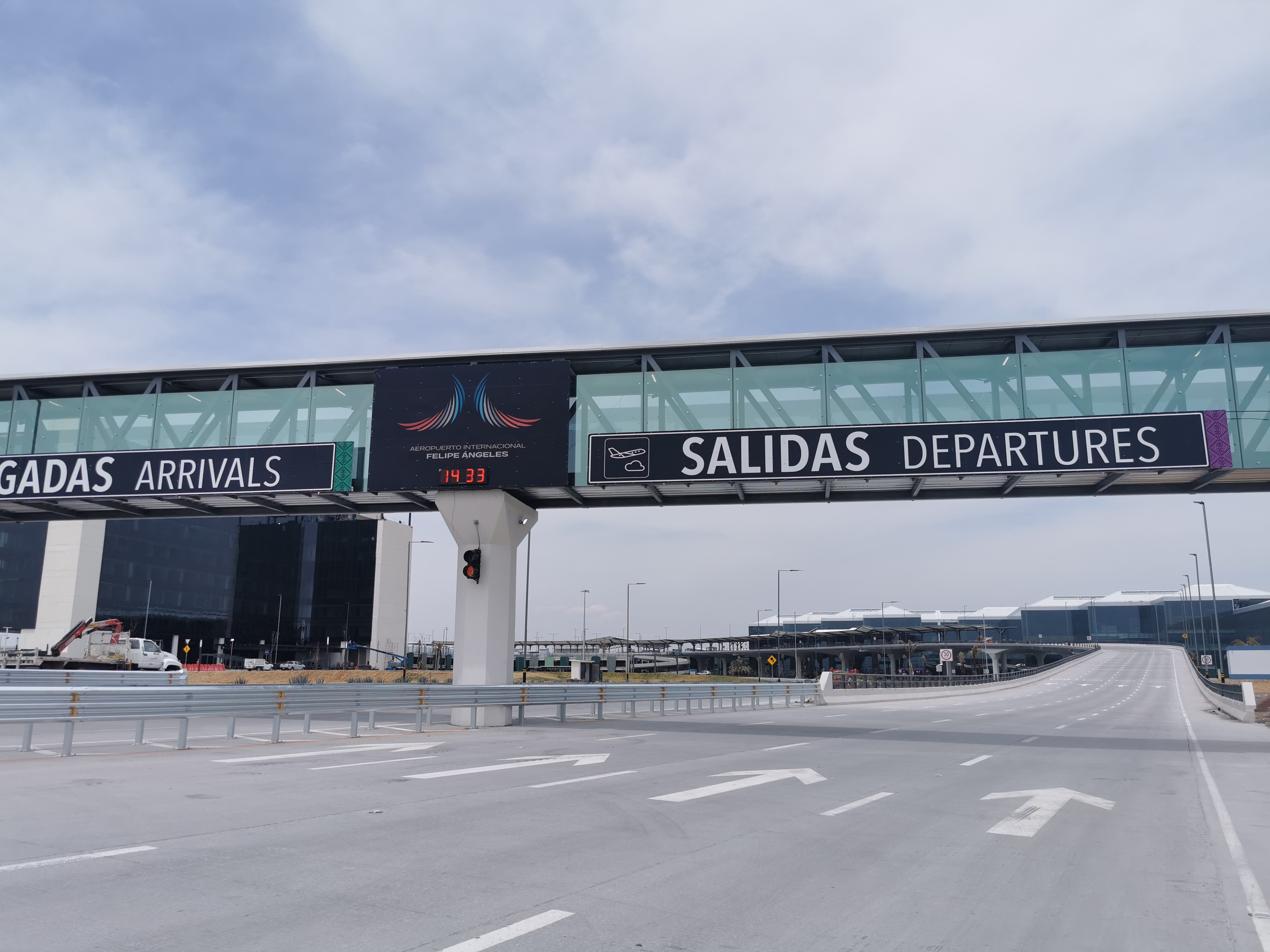
Road access to the passenger terminal

=== Road ===
The primary vehicular entrance to the airport is connected to a highway from the Circuito Exterior Mexiquense, spanning approximately 4.5 kilometres (2.8 mi). Within the airport grounds, a road with three entry lanes, three exit lanes, and mammoth sculptures reflecting discoveries in the central area facilitates access to the terminal. Future plans include extending the Mexico-Pachuca highway towards the airport, with a deviation near Santa Lucía to connect to the terminal.

=== Bus ===
On the ground floor of the Ground Transportation Terminal (TITT), a bus station accommodates long-distance passengers with space for 16 buses. The terminal comprises ticket counters, automated machines, waiting areas, a VIP lounge, ATMs, retail stores, currency exchange services, souvenir shops, package services, a cargo warehouse, toilets, administrative offices, staff rest areas, and other amenities, including Wi-Fi, fast food options, and toilets.

Private company Autobuses de Oriente provides connections to and from TAPO, Indios Verdes, and Mexico City International Airport. Additionally, ETN Turistar offers services connecting the airport to Terminal Central de Autobuses del Sur, Terminal Central de Autobuses del Norte, and Terminal de Autobuses de Querétaro.

These services are current as of November 2023:

Company	Destinations within Greater Mexico City
ADO	Metro Indios Verdes, Terminal del Norte
ADO Conecta	Mexico City International Airport T1, TAPO
Conexión	Terminal del Norte
Ebus	Ángel de la Independencia, Auditorio Nacional, WTC
Ecoelite	Monumento a la Revolución, Palacio de Bellas Artes, Plaza Satélite, Real Inn Perinorte
ETN/VIVABUS	Tepotzotlán, Terminal del Norte, Terminal del Sur
Flecha Roja	Tepotzotlán, Terminal Observatorio
Futura	Terminal del Norte
Pullman de Morelos	Mexico City International Airport T1, Perisur
Company	Long-distance destinations
ADO	Pachuca, Poza Rica, Puebla, Tuxpan
Autovías/La Línea	Atlacomulco, Jilotepec
AVM Ovnibus	Actopan, Huehuetoca, Ixmiquilpan, Pachuca, Progreso de Obregón
Caminante	Toluca-Comonfort, Toluca-Tollocan
Costa Line	Acapulco, Chilpancingo
Estrella Roja	Puebla
Estrella Blanca (Conexión)	Pachuca
ETN/VIVABUS	Querétaro, San Juan del Río
Futura	Pachuca, Tulancingo
ODM	Huauchinango, Pachuca, Poza Rica, Tampico, Tuxpan
ODT	Pachuca
Primera Plus	Querétaro, San Juan del Río
Pullman de Morelos	Cuernavaca

=== Taxi ===
The airport provides designated boarding areas for taxis that have received approval from the Department of Infrastructure, Communications, and Transportation (SICT). These services are closely regulated by the airport authorities to ensure safety and reliability.

=== Public transport ===
The Mexibús bus rapid transit system Line I, offers a connection to Ojo de Agua station in the State of Mexico. From Ojo de Agua, passengers can transfer to Ciudad Azteca metro station. Plans are underway to extend Mexibús Line IV to AIFA in the future, creating an additional connection between the airport and the metro system at Indios Verdes station.

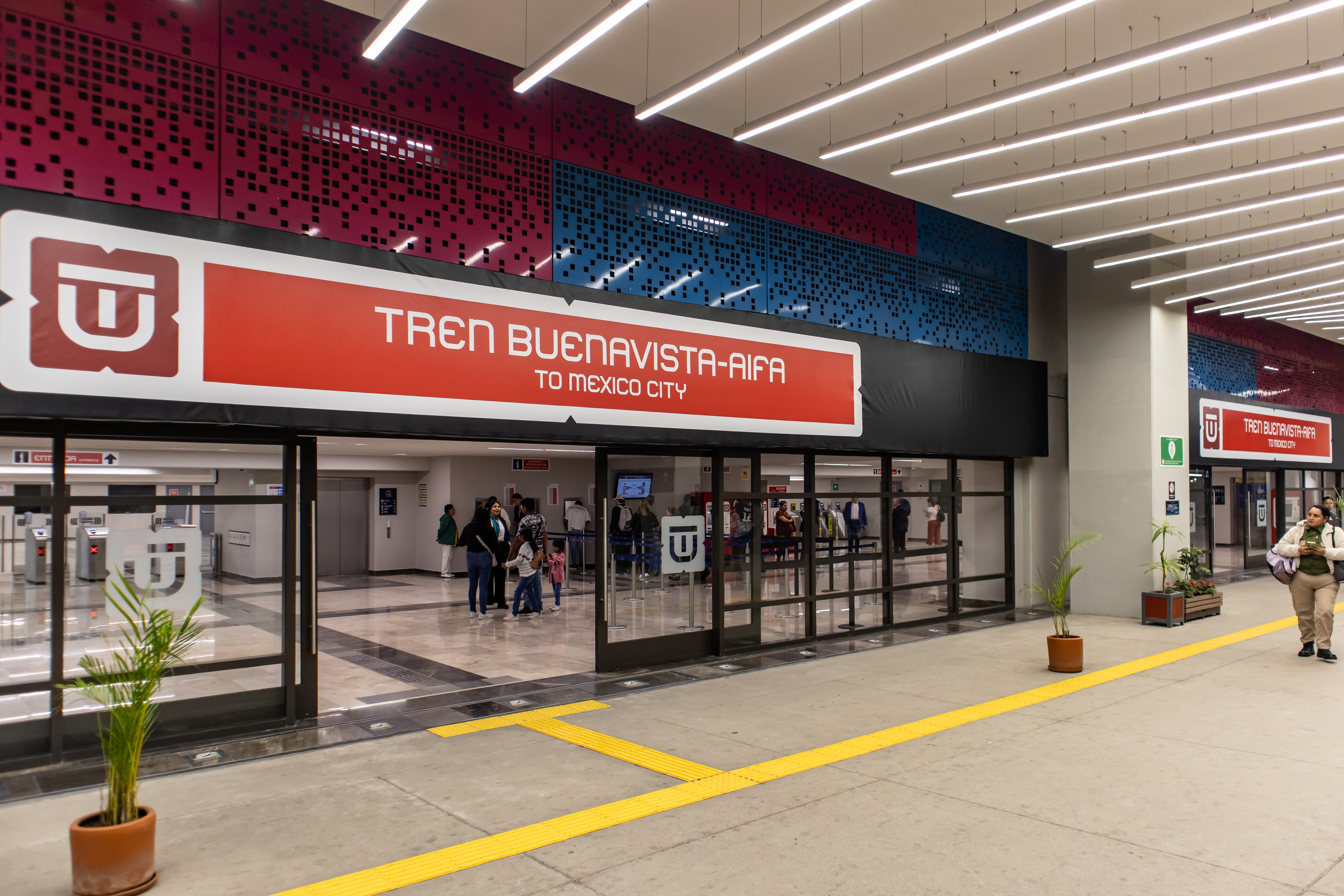
Entrance to the AIFA–Clara Krause station of the Felipe Ángeles train.

=== Rail connection ===
The airport station, AIFA–Clara Krause railway station, opened on 26 April 2026. The Felipe Ángeles train connects the airport with Buenavista railway station in the Cuauhtémoc borough in central Mexico City, branching off an existing line at Lechería station, heading northeast to the airport grounds.

The branch line was presented in 2020 as a 23 kilometres (14 mi) extension of the Suburban train network to serve the airport. It uses the Tarjeta de Movilidad Integrada, instead of separate ticketing like the Tren Suburbano. Originally anticipated for completion by December 2023, delays related to construction challenges, particularly the relocation of tracks for cargo-carrying trains, pushed the expected opening first to June 2024, , then July 2025 , but it was opened April 2026.

== Air Force Base Nr. 1 Santa Lucía ==
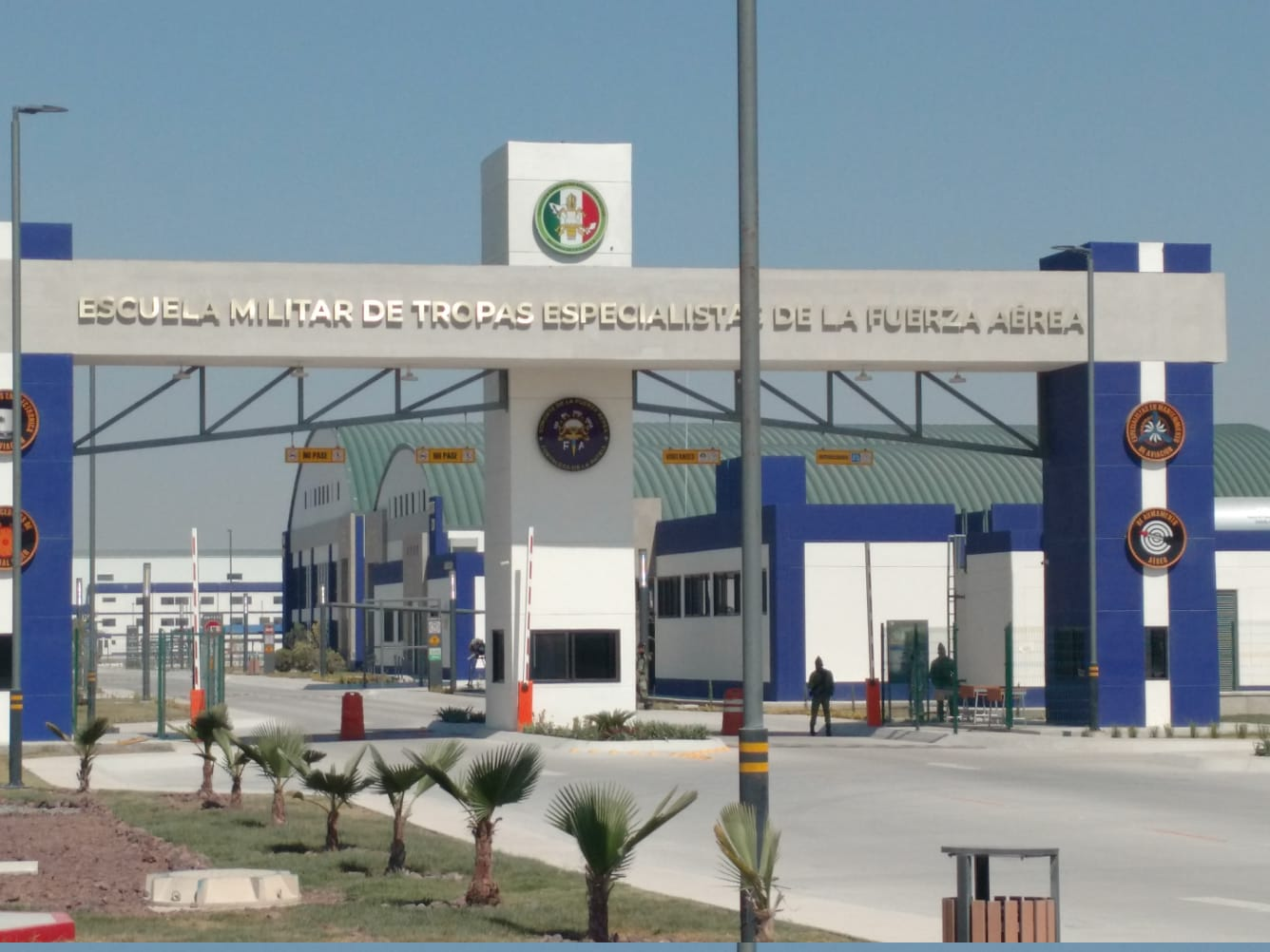
Entrance to The Military School of Specialist Troops

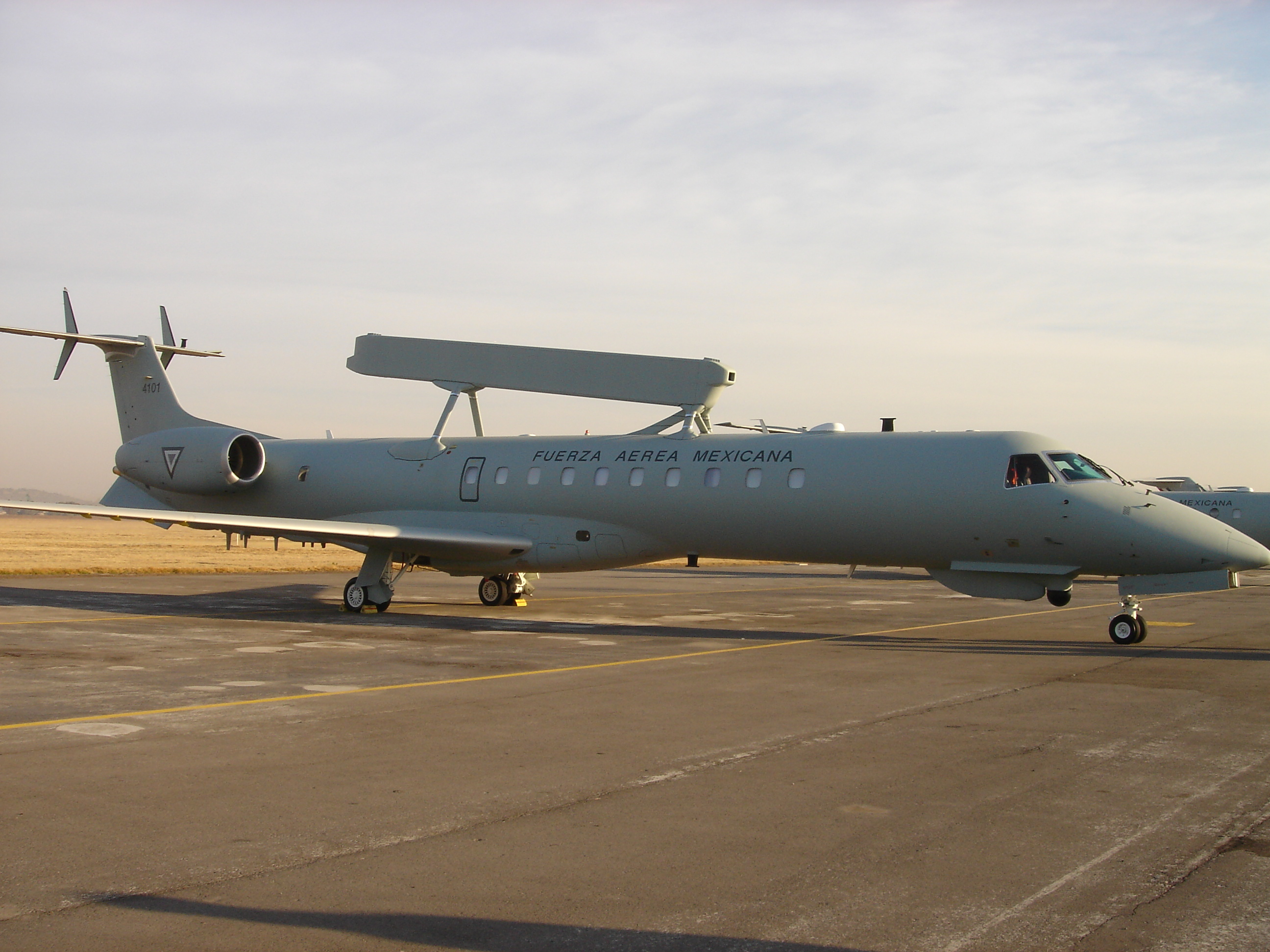
Embraer ERJ145 aircraft at Air Force Base Nr.1

Air Force Base Nr. 1 (Spanish: Base Aérea Militar N.º 1, Santa Lucía) (B.A.M. No. 1) is located in the eastern section of the airport grounds just south of San Lucas Xolox. The base encompasses a housing complex for military personnel affiliated with the Mexican Army. The facilities at the Military Air Base include a military aviation apron, control tower, and runway 04R/22L, designated exclusively for military use. It serves as a hub for various units and headquarters related to reconnaissance, transport, combat wings, specialized training centers, and sports facilities. Additionally, it houses facilities dedicated to national security and natural disaster response. Following the construction of the civilian airport, B.A.M. No. 1 underwent a complete reconstruction, adopting a new configuration that includes a military town with housing units, the 37th Military Zone General Command, a Pavilion for Dignitaries, a housing complex, a military hospital, the Military Police Training Center, a Shopping Center, and The Military School of Specialist Troops (EMTEFAM). Operational Squadrons at BAM No. 1 include:

- 401 Air Squadron: Operates supersonic F-5E/F twin-jet aircraft designed for attack and air defense missions, featuring a maximum speed of Mach 1.63 and a range of 2,483 kilometres (1,543 mi).
- 101 Air Squadron: Operates EC725 Cougar aircraft.
- 112 Air Squadron: Operates MD-530F aircraft.
- 104 Air Squadron: Operates Bell 412 aircraft.
- 301 Air Squadron: Operates C-295 aircraft.
- 302 Air Squadron: Operates C-130 and C-27J aircraft.
- 303 Air Squadron: Operates Mi-17 aircraft.
- 502 Air Squadron: Operates Boeing 737-200 and Boeing 737-800 aircraft.
- Air Surveillance Squadron: Operates Embraer 145 aircraft.
- Phototechnical Air Squadron: Operates C-90 aircraft.

== See also ==
- List of the busiest airports in Mexico
- List of airports in Mexico
- List of airports by ICAO code: M
- List of busiest airports in North America
- List of the busiest airports in Latin America
- Transportation in Mexico
- Tourism in Mexico
- Mexico City International Airport
- Mexico City Texcoco Airport
- List of Mexican military installations
- Mexican Air Force
- Aerolínea del Estado Mexicano
- Transport in Mexico City
- Valley of Mexico
- Greater Mexico City
- Zumpango Region
- Mexibús
