= Bahías de Huatulco International Airport =

International airport serving Huatulco, Oaxaca, Mexico

Huatulco International Airport Aeropuerto Internacional de Huatulco
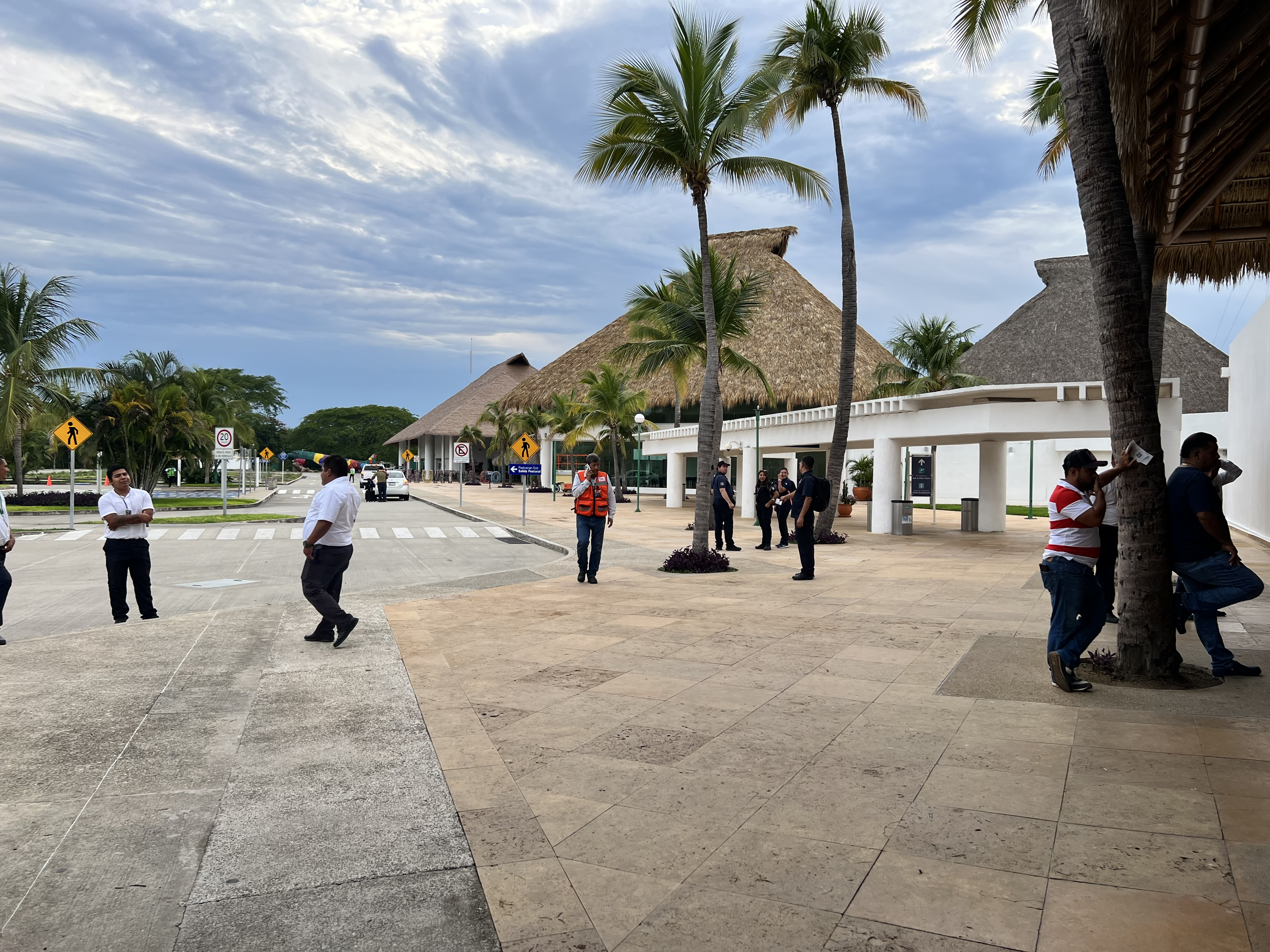
- IATA: HUX; ICAO: MMBT

Summary
- Airport type: Public
- Owner/Operator: Grupo Aeroportuario del Sureste
- Serves: Huatulco, Oaxaca, Mexico
- Time zone: CST (UTC-06:00)
- Elevation AMSL: 141 m / 463 ft
- Coordinates: 15°46′31″N 096°15′45″W
- Website: www.asur.com.mx/Contenido/Huatulco/shopping

Map
- Location of the airport in Oaxaca HUX (Mexico)

Runways
Direction	Length		Surface
Direction	m	ft	Surface
07/25	3,000	9,843	Asphalt

Statistics (2025)
- Total passengers: 801,803
- Ranking in Mexico: 31st ▼3
- Source: Grupo Aeroportuario del Sureste

Huatulco International Airport (Spanish: Aeropuerto Internacional de Huatulco) (Note: Aeropuertos del Sureste (ASUR) lists the airport's name as Huatulco International Airport.) (IATA: HUX, ICAO: MMBT) is an international airport located in Santa María Huatulco, in the State of Oaxaca, Mexico. The airport manages both domestic and international air traffic for the southern and southeastern Pacific coast of Oaxaca, and it serves as an international gateway to the Mexican tourist destination of Huatulco and the Costa Region of Oaxaca. The airport is owned by Aeropuertos del Sureste (ASUR).

Huatulco Airport experienced rapid growth up to March 2022, becoming one of the fastest-growing airports in the country and offering nonstop flights to many major cities in Mexico and seasonal flights to destinations in the United States and Canada. In 2024, the airport served 847,178 passengers, and 801,803 passengers in 2025, a 5.4% decrease from previous year.

== Facilities ==
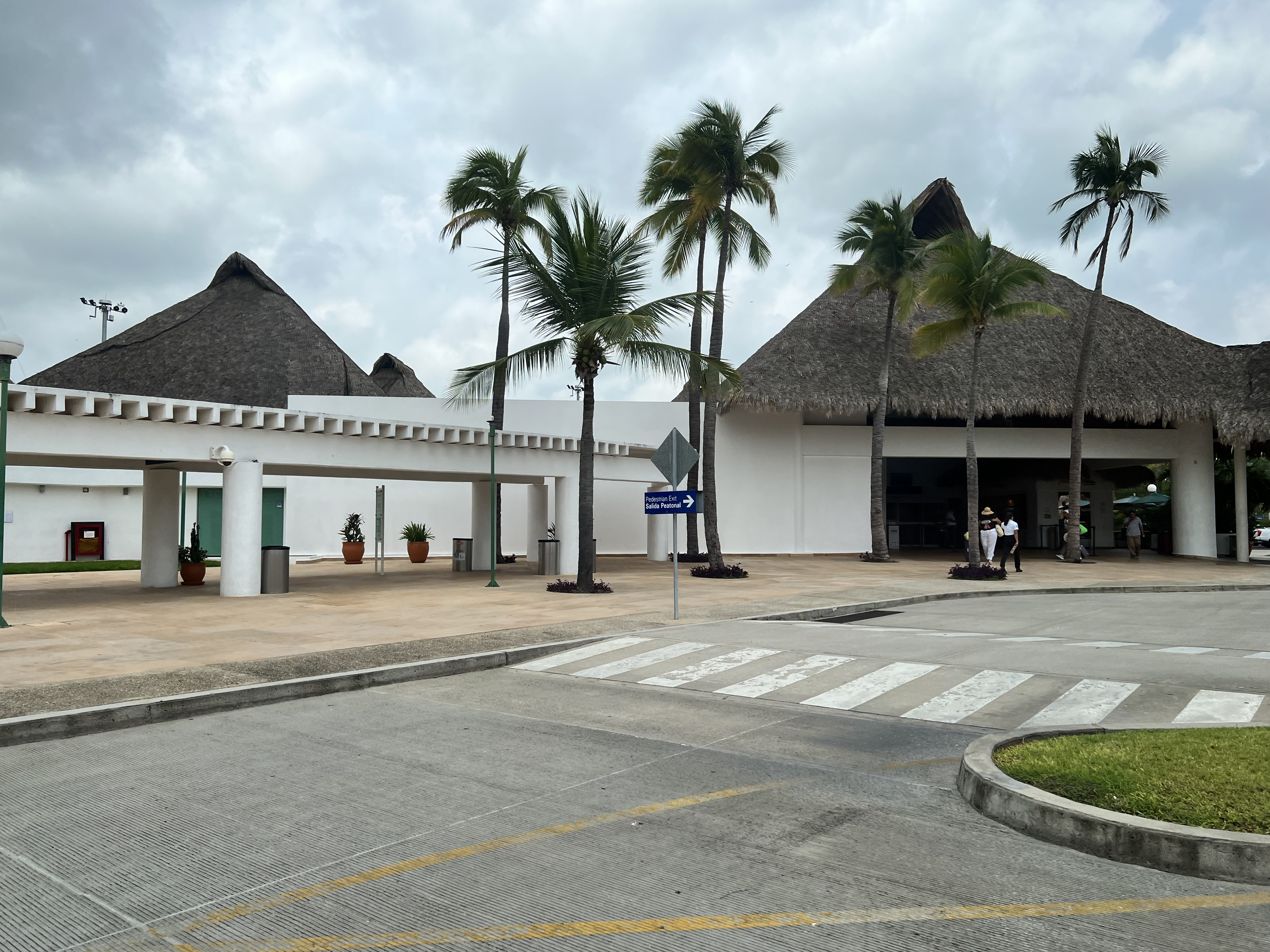
Terminal entrance

The airport is situated at an elevation of 141 metres (463 ft) above mean sea level. It has one runway designated as 07/25, featuring an asphalt surface measuring 3,000 by 45 metres (9,843 ft × 148 ft). It has the capacity to accommodate wide-body aircraft like the Boeing 747 aircraft and perform 20 operations per hour. The apron has 7 fixed aircraft parking positions, with 5 being of type C and 1 of type E.

The passenger terminal houses both arrival and departure facilities for domestic and international flights within a single-story building spanning 8,132 square metres (87,530 sq ft). The terminal's distinctive architecture features a series of thatched roof structures crafted from dried palm leaves, known as Palapas, a traditional construction technique frequently seen on Mexican beaches. The terminal has eight gates, a VIP lounge, dining options, duty-free shops, parking areas, car rental services, various retail stores, and a bus terminal for shuttle services and airport transfers to tourist resorts in the region.

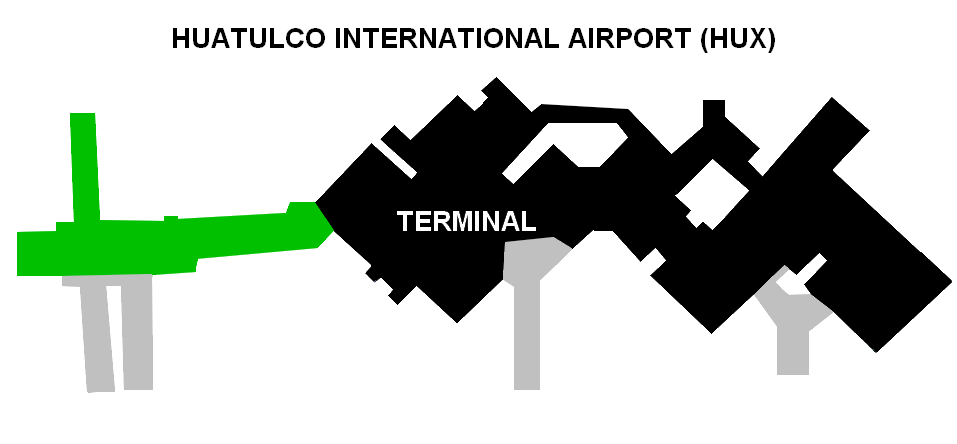
Terminal diagram

Furthermore, the airport accommodates logistics and courier companies and features a dedicated general aviation terminal that supports various activities such as tourism, flight training, executive aviation, and general aviation.

== Airlines and destinations ==
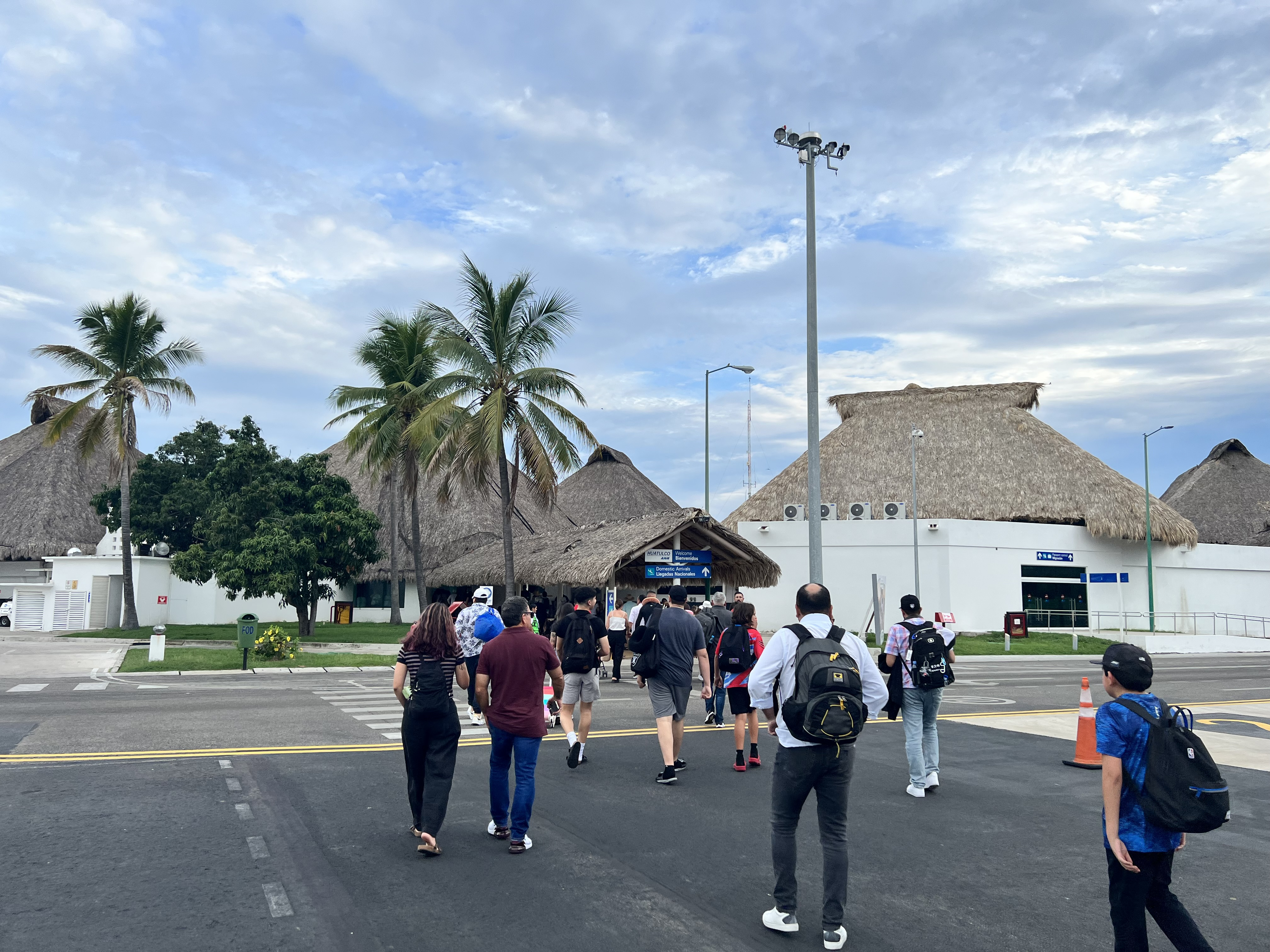
Airside of the airport

=== Passenger ===
Airlines	Destinations
Aeroméxico	Mexico City–Benito Juárez
Aeroméxico Connect	Mexico City–Benito Juárez
Aerotucán	Oaxaca
Aerovega	Oaxaca
Air Canada	Seasonal: Toronto–Pearson, Vancouver
American Eagle	Seasonal: Dallas/Fort Worth
TAG Airlines	Seasonal: Guatemala City
Viva	Mexico City–Benito Juárez, Mexico City–Felipe Ángeles, Monterrey
Volaris	Guadalajara, Mexico City–Benito Juárez, Puebla
WestJet	Seasonal: Calgary, Edmonton, Toronto–Pearson, Vancouver, Winnipeg

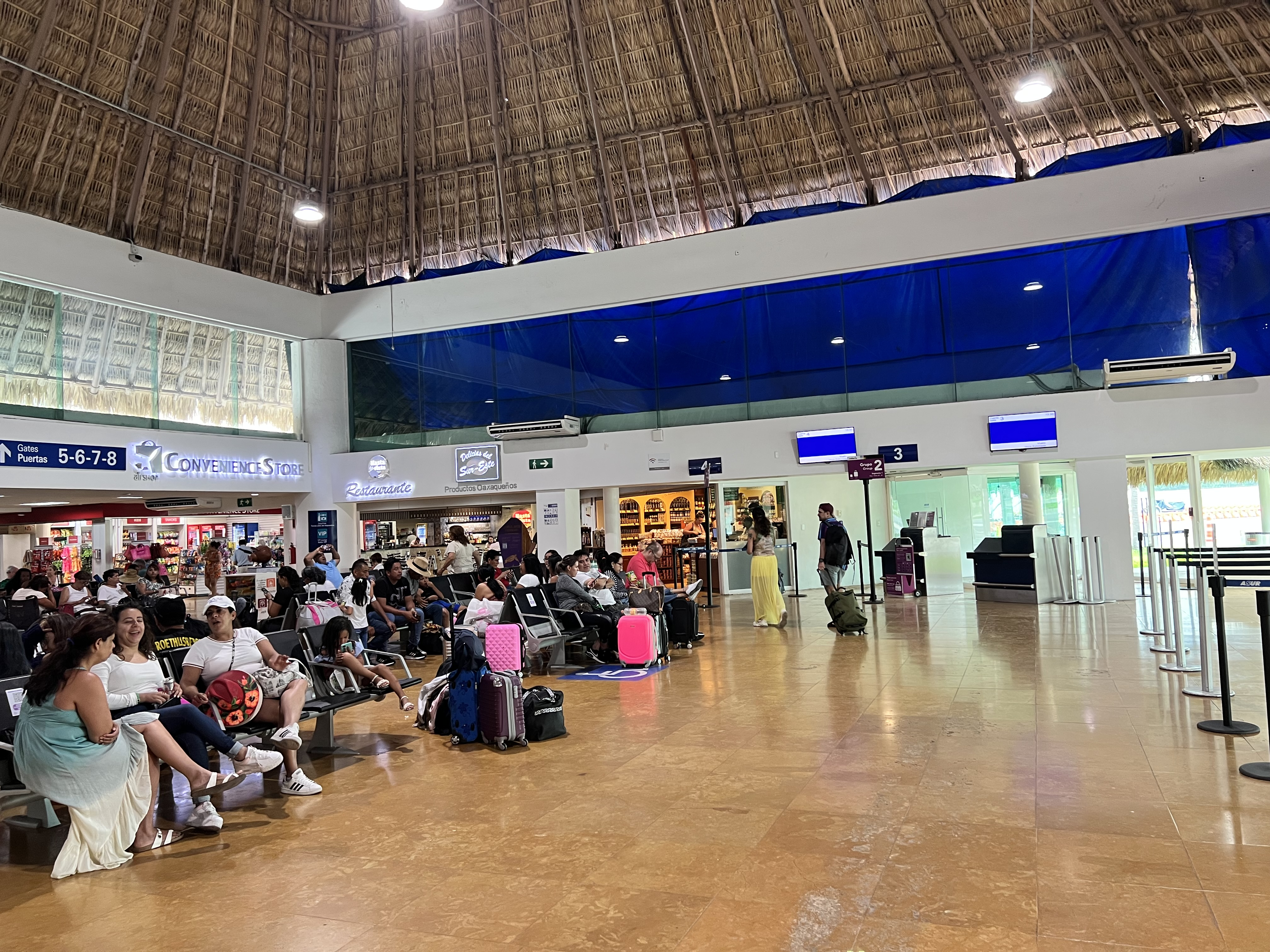
Departures concourse

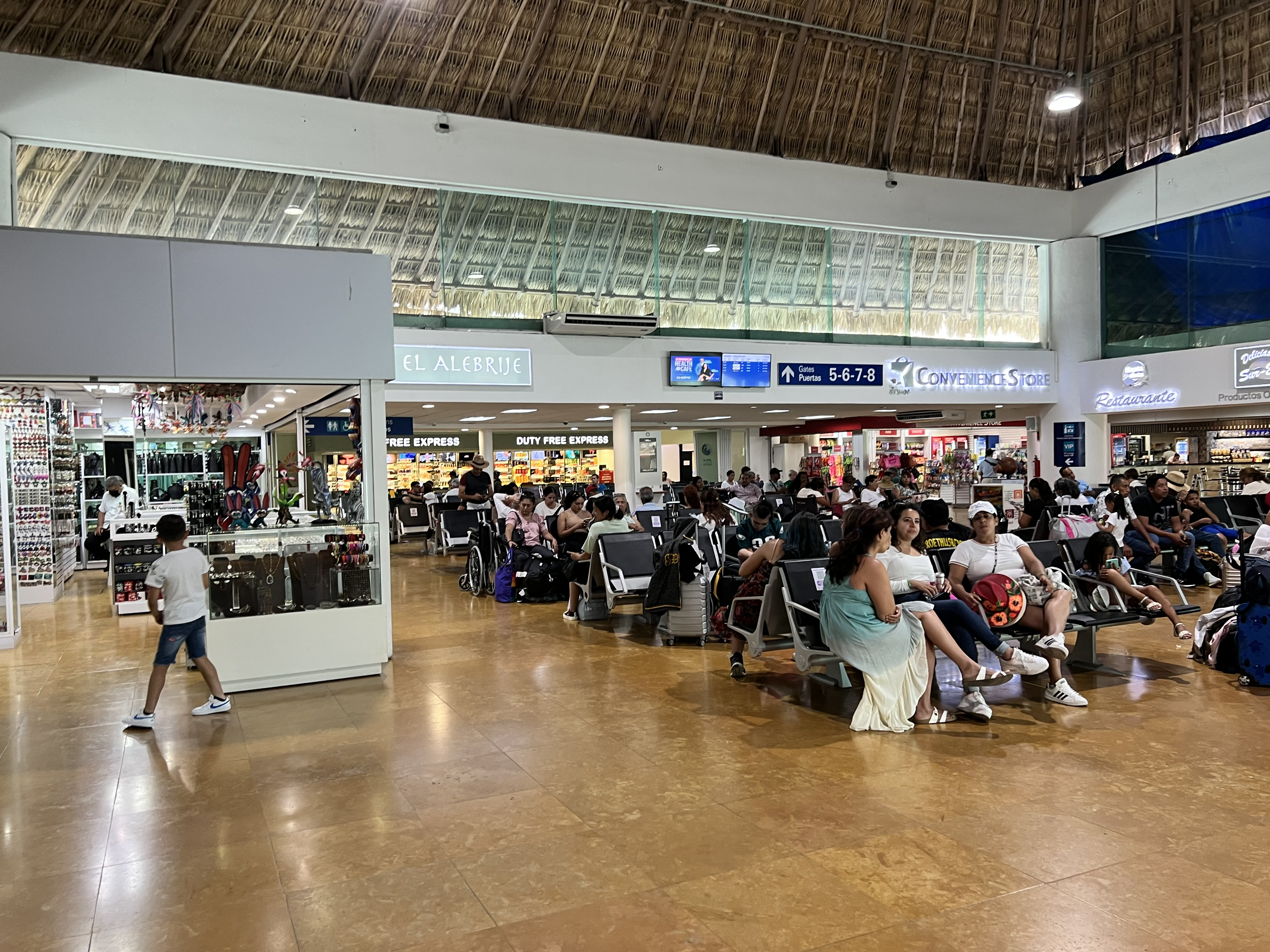
Departures concourse

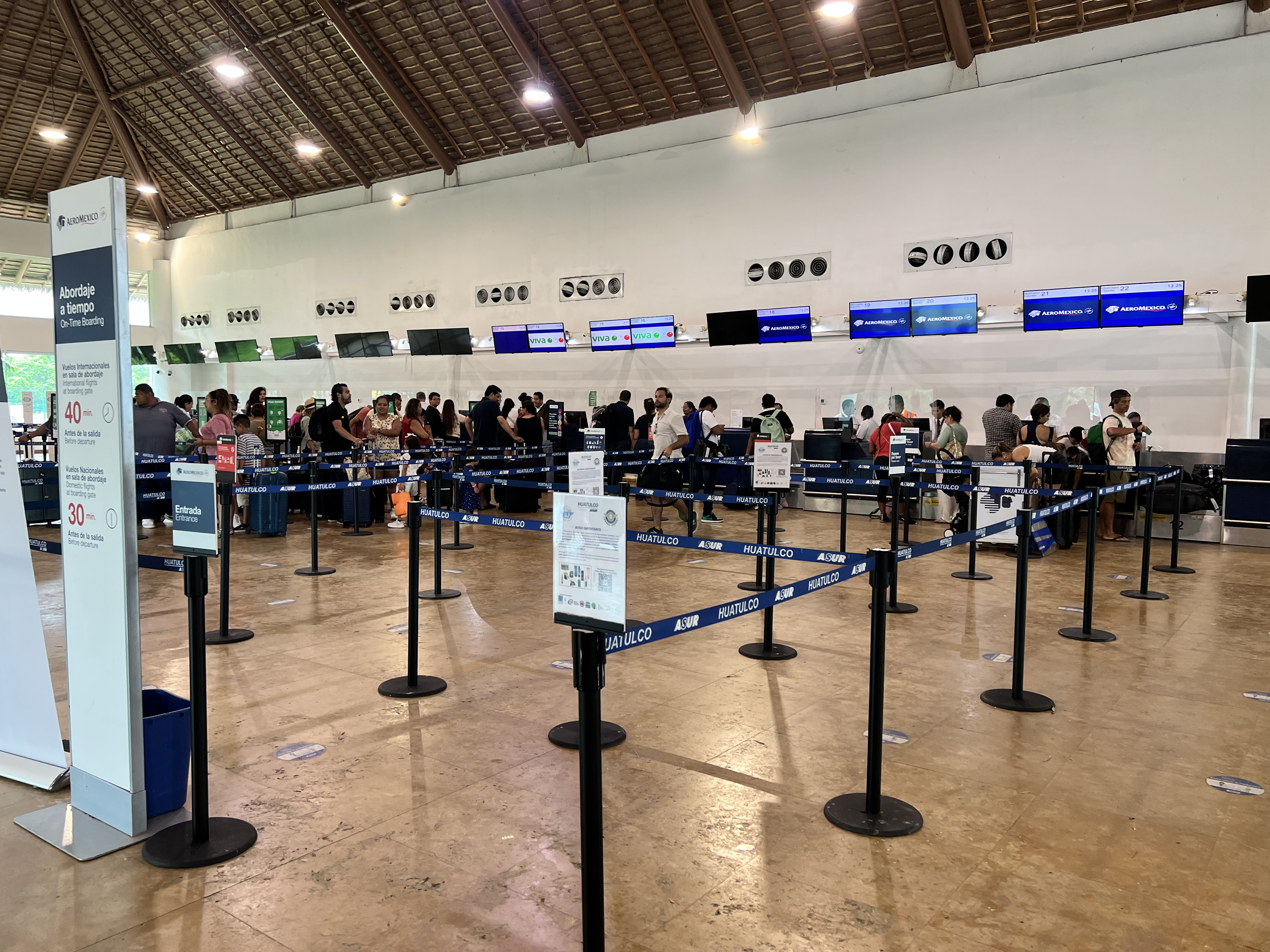
Check-in area

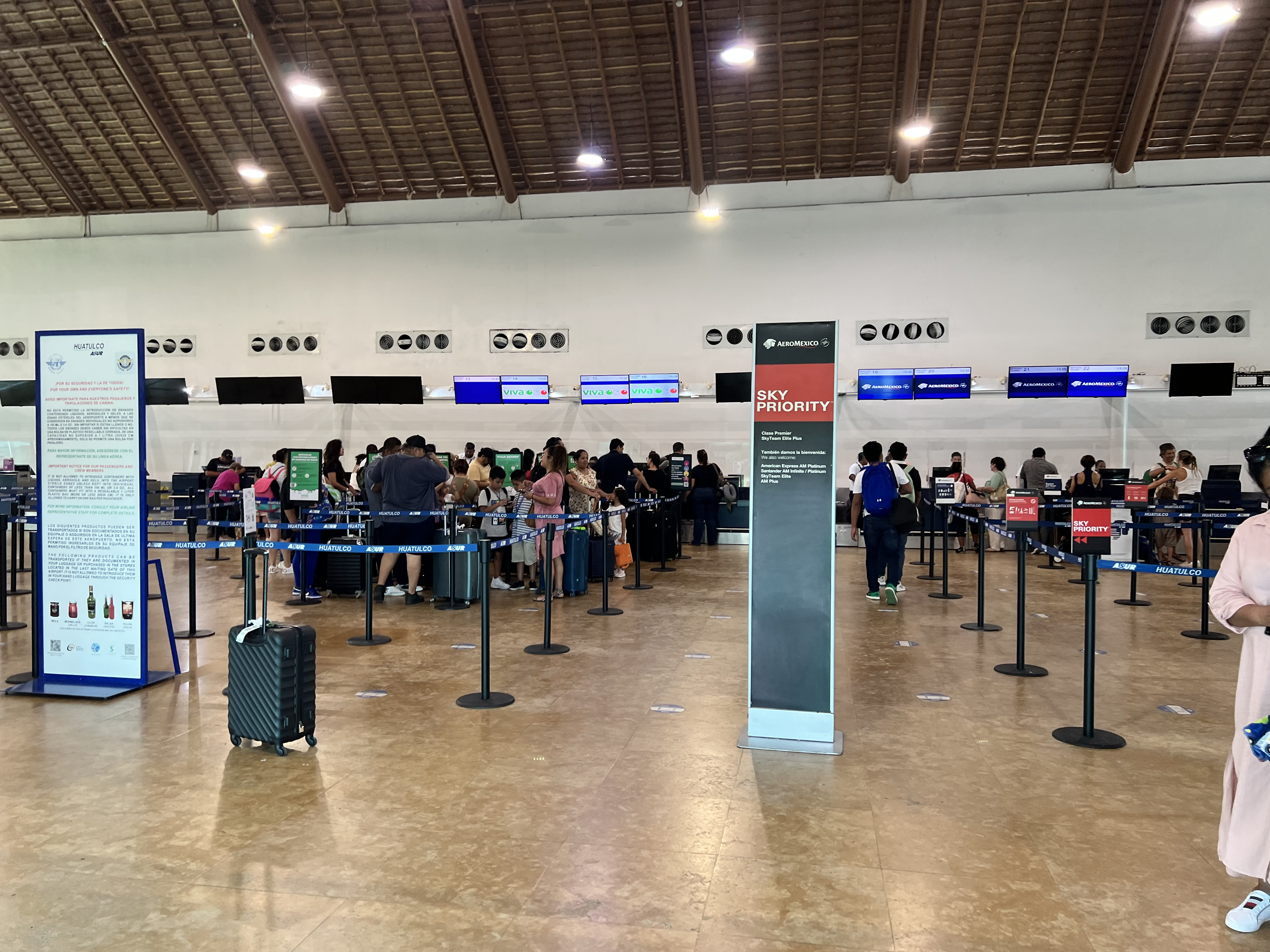
Check-in area

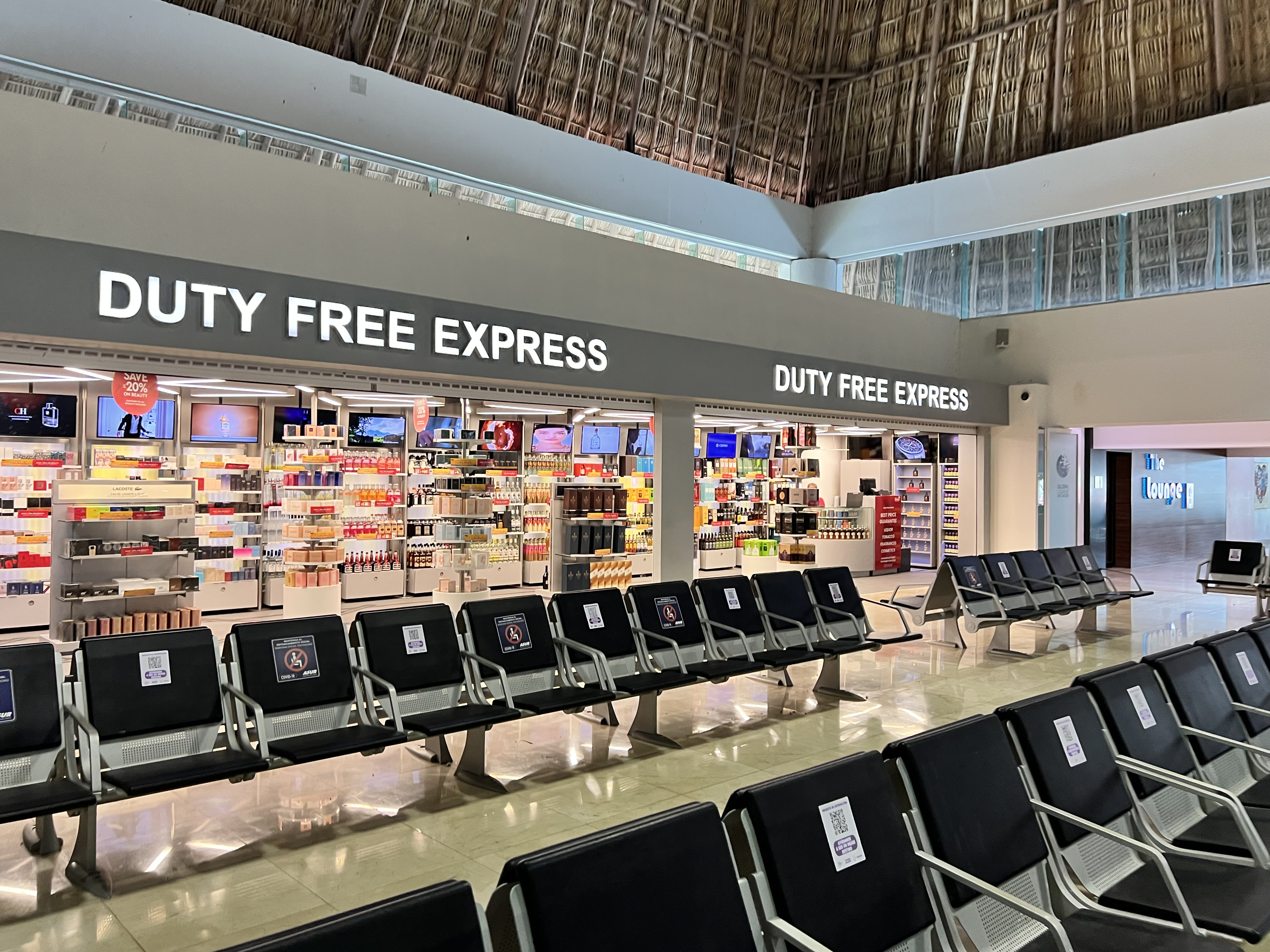
Duty-free shops

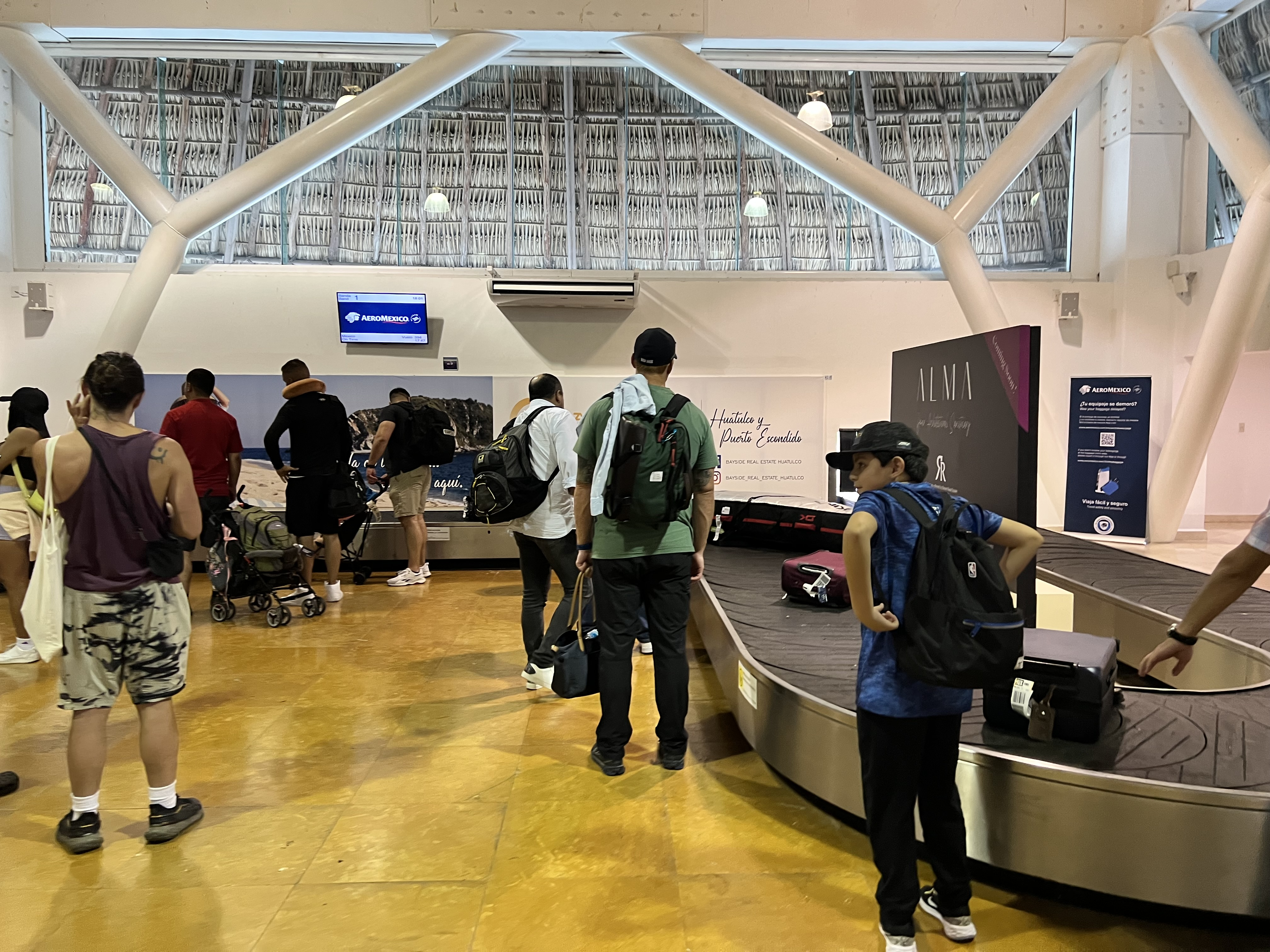
Baggage claim area

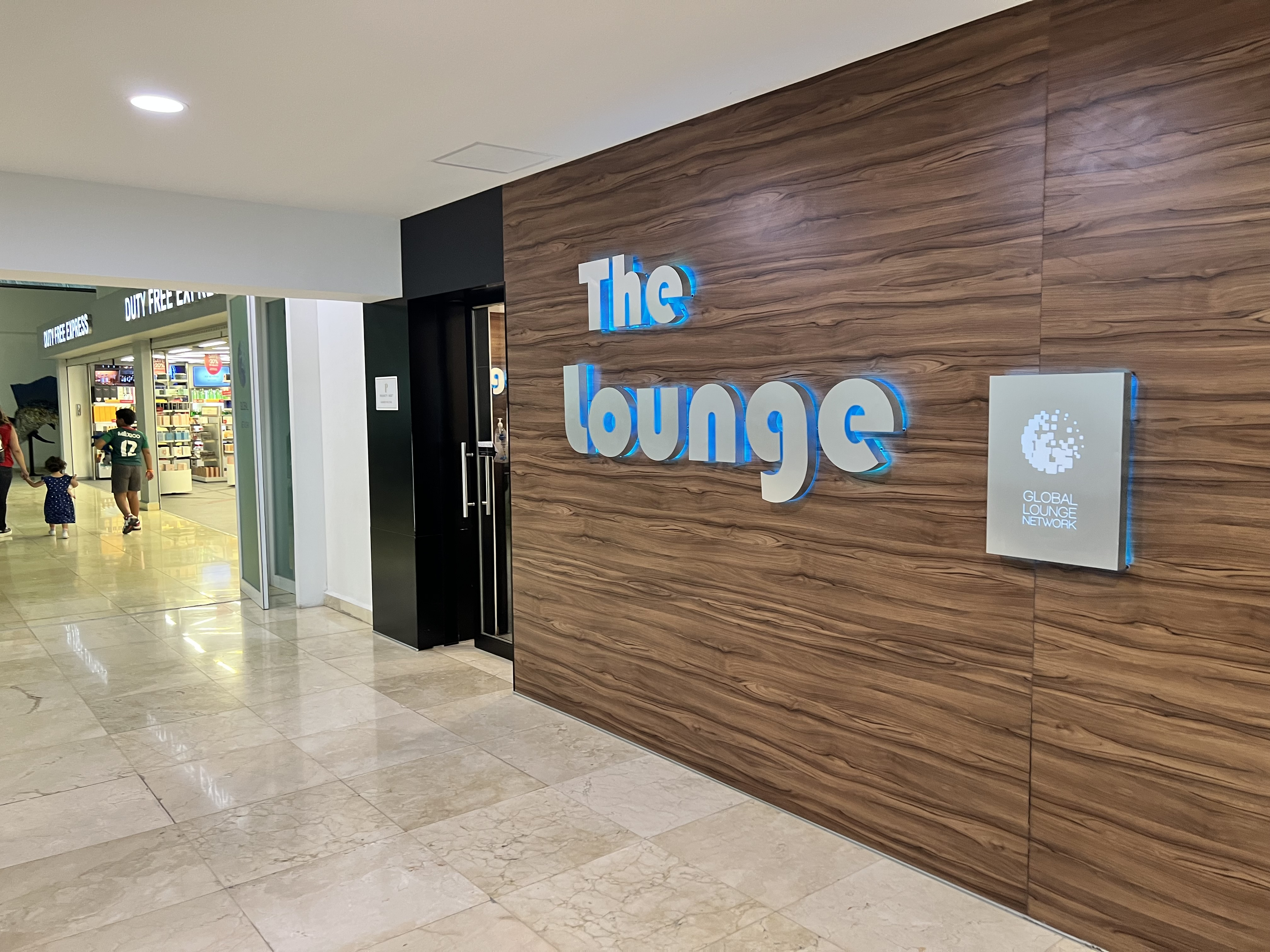
VIP lounge

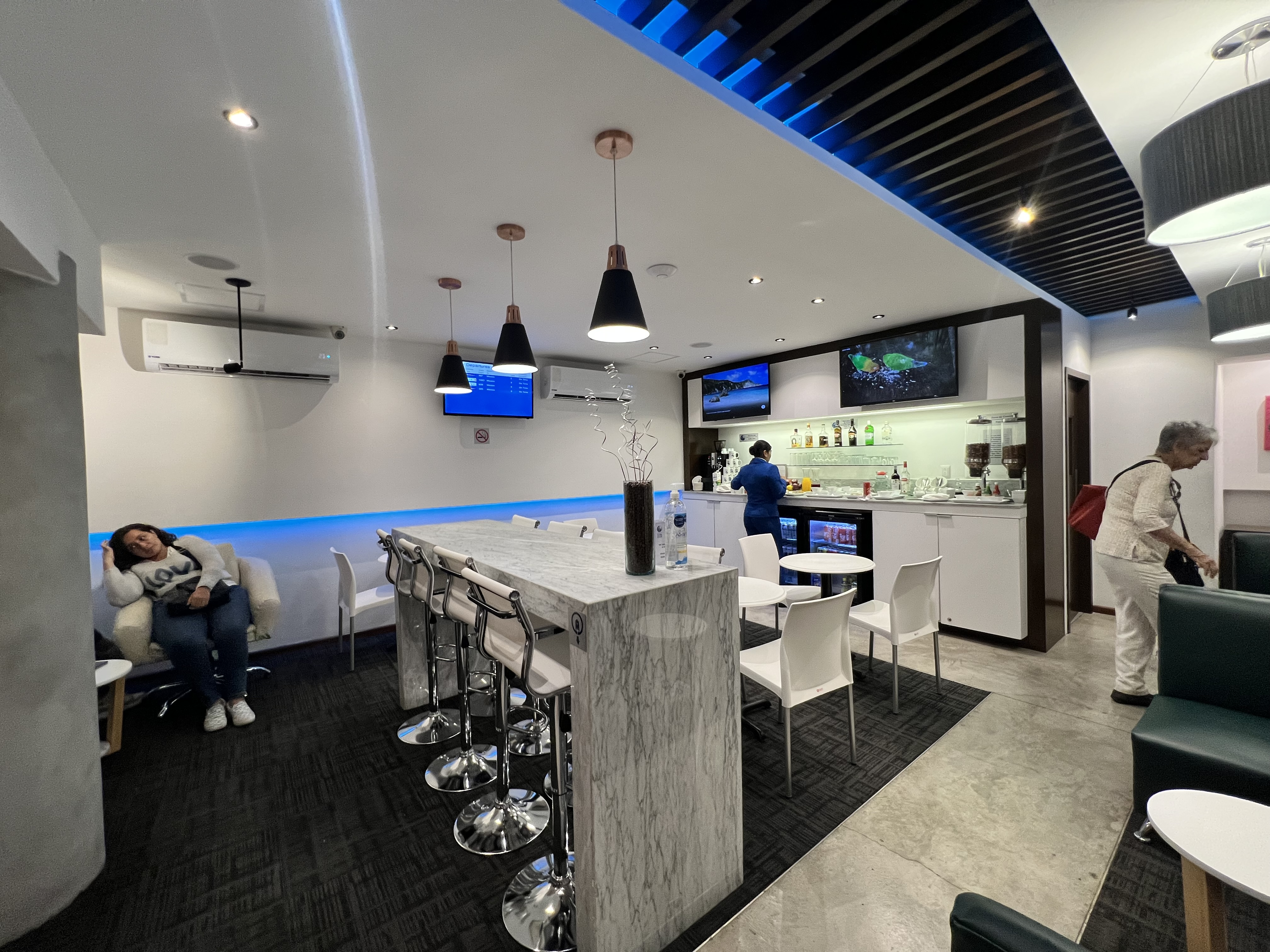
VIP lounge

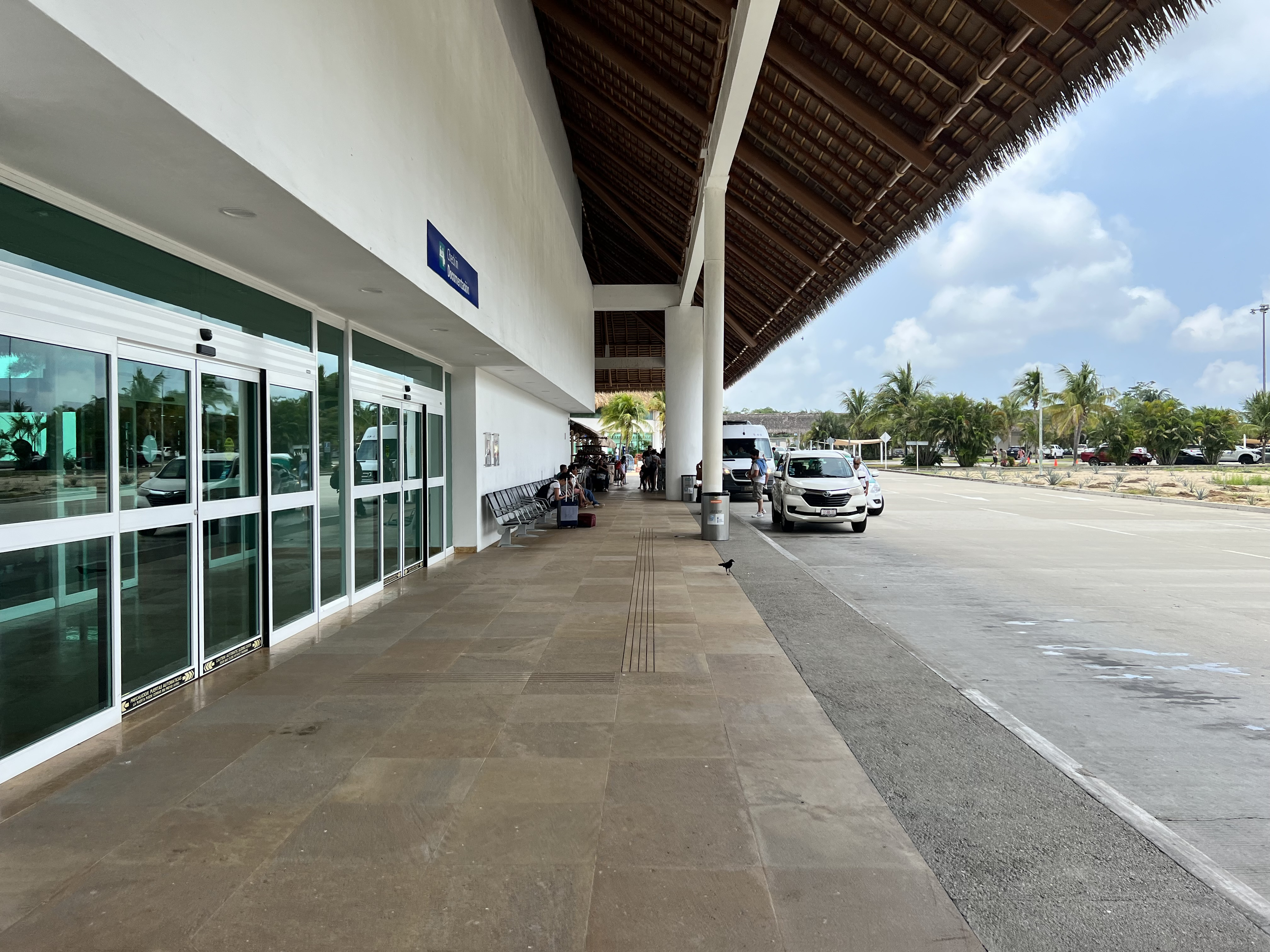
Terminal entrance

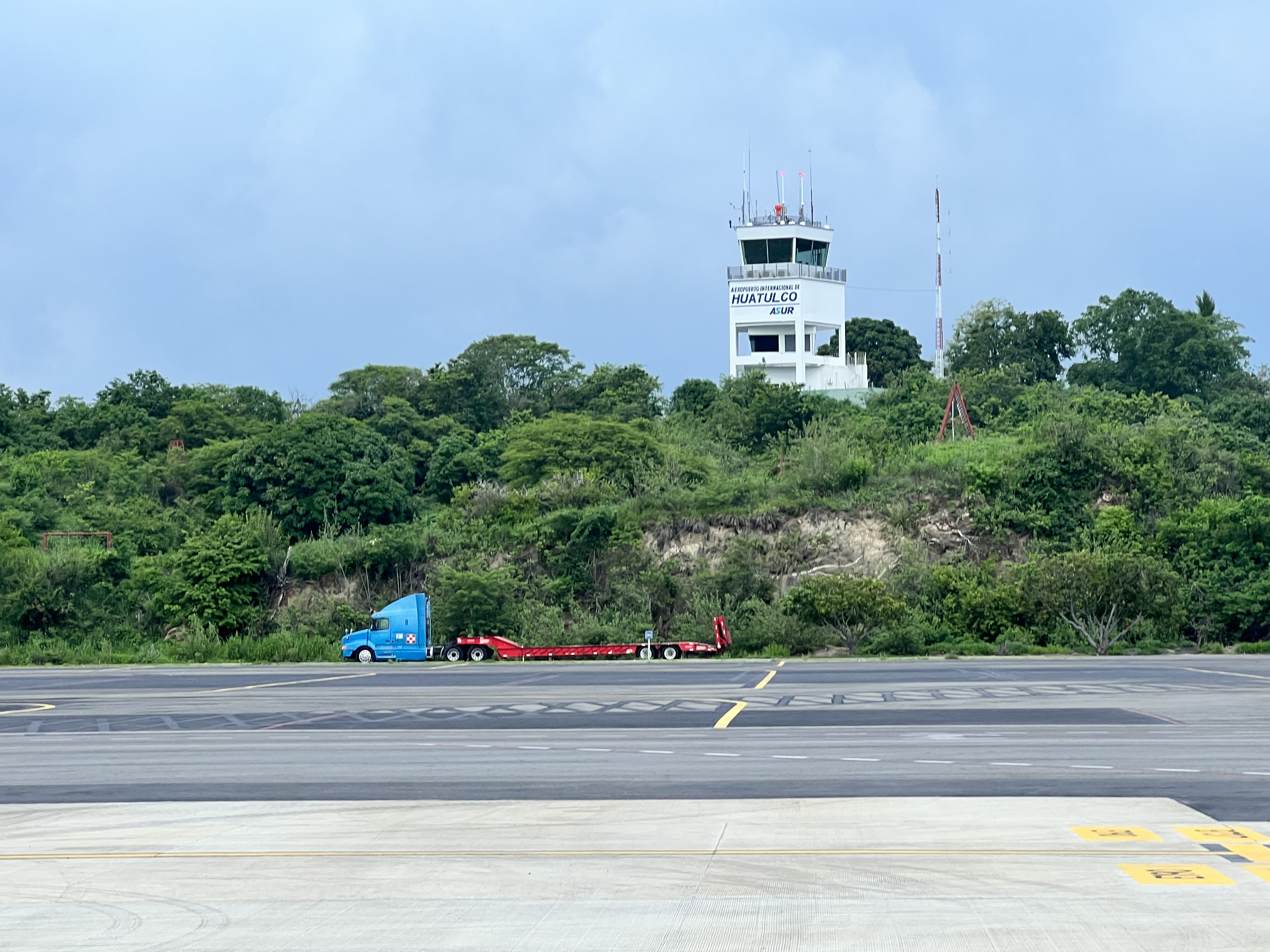
Control tower

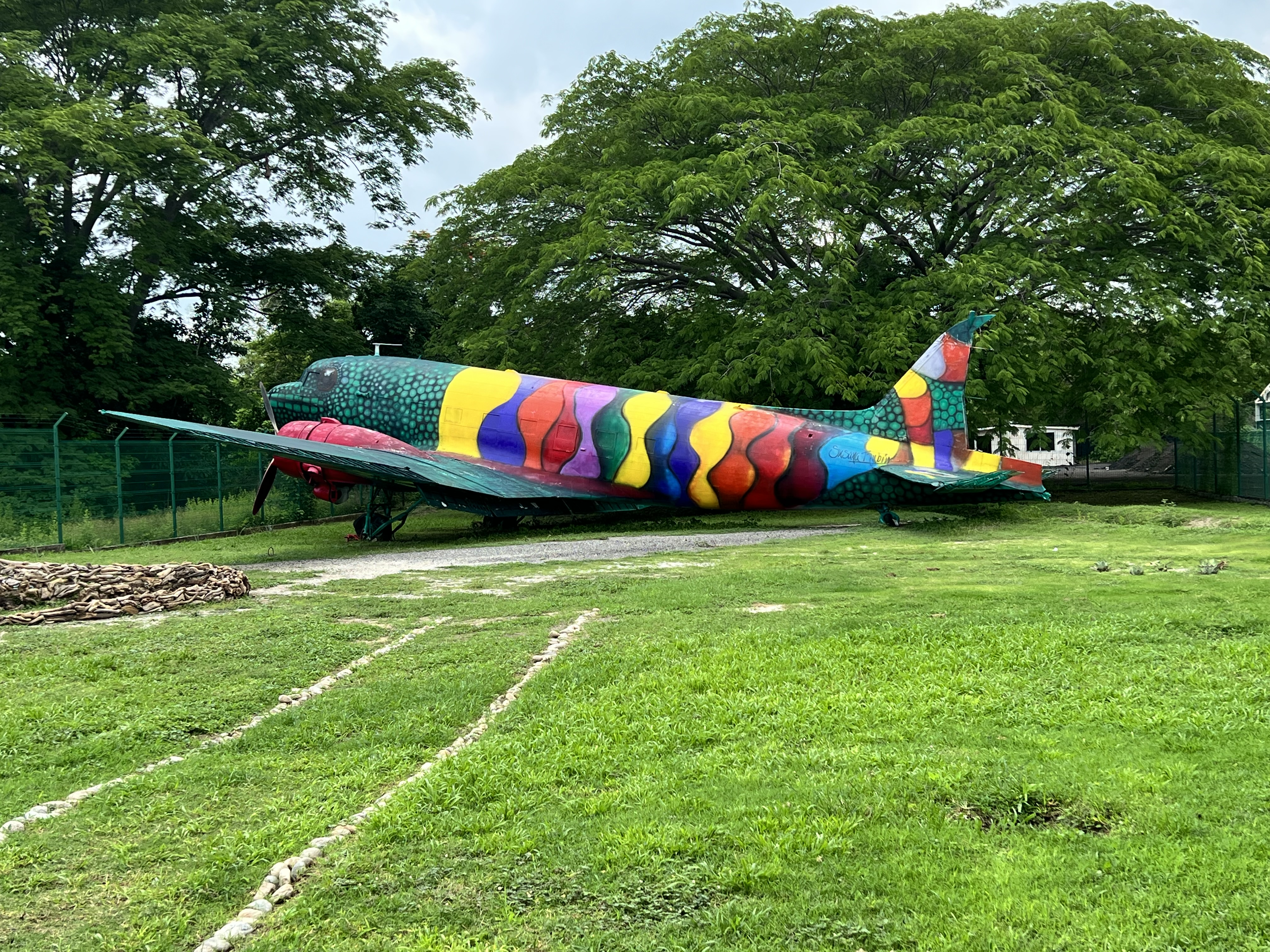
Preserved aircraft at HUX entrance

=== Destinations maps ===
Domestic destinations from Huatulco International Airport
Red = Year-round destination
Blue = Future destination
Green = Seasonal destination
International destinations from Huatulco International Airport
Red = Year-round destination
Blue = Future destination
Green = Seasonal destination

== Statistics ==
=== Annual Traffic ===
Passenger statistics at HUX
Year	Total Passengers	change %
2000	331,429	Steady
2001	317,304	▼4.26%
2002	268,354	▼15.42%
2003	259,386	▼3.34%
2004	270,757	▲4.38%
2005	312,055	▲15.25%
2006	375,276	▲20.25%
2007	375,930	▲0.17%
2008	365,952	▼2.65%
2009	388,068	▲6.04%
2010	385,593	▼0.63%
2011	459,640	▲19.20%
2012	473,262	▲2.96%
2013	484,604	▲2.39%
2014	519,619	▲7.22%
2015	618,767	▲19.08%
2016	662,780	▲7.11%
2017	776,632	▲17.2%
2018	819,305	▲5.49%
2019	892,287	▲8.9%
2020	402,728	▼54.9%
2021	692,150	▲71.9%
2022	971,035	▲40.3%
2023	914,714	▼5.8%
2024	847,178	▼7.4%
2025	801,803	▼5.4%

=== Busiest routes ===
Busiest routes from HUX (Jan–Dec 2025)
Rank	Airport	Passengers
1	Mexico City, Mexico City	232,919
2	Mexico City–AIFA, State of Mexico	61,711
3	Guadalajara, Jalisco	19,532
4	Calgary, Canada	18,680
5	Monterrey, Nuevo León	16,011
6	Vancouver, Canada	14,143
7	Dallas/Fort Worth, United States	11,418
8	Edmonton, Canada	4,168
9	Toronto–Pearson, Canada	7,956
10	Winnipeg, Canada	3,056

== See also ==
- List of the busiest airports in Mexico
- List of airports in Mexico
- List of airports by ICAO code: M
- List of busiest airports in North America
- List of the busiest airports in Latin America
- Transportation in Mexico
- Tourism in Mexico
- Grupo Aeroportuario del Sureste
- List of beaches in Mexico
- Costa Region
- Huatulco National Park
- Playa Zipolite
- Mazunte
- Playa de Escobilla Sanctuary
- Lagunas de Chacahua National Park
- Laguna de Manialtepec
