= Puerto Escondido International Airport =

International airport in Puerto Escondido, Oaxaca, Mexico

Puerto Escondido International Airport Aeropuerto Internacional de Puerto Escondido
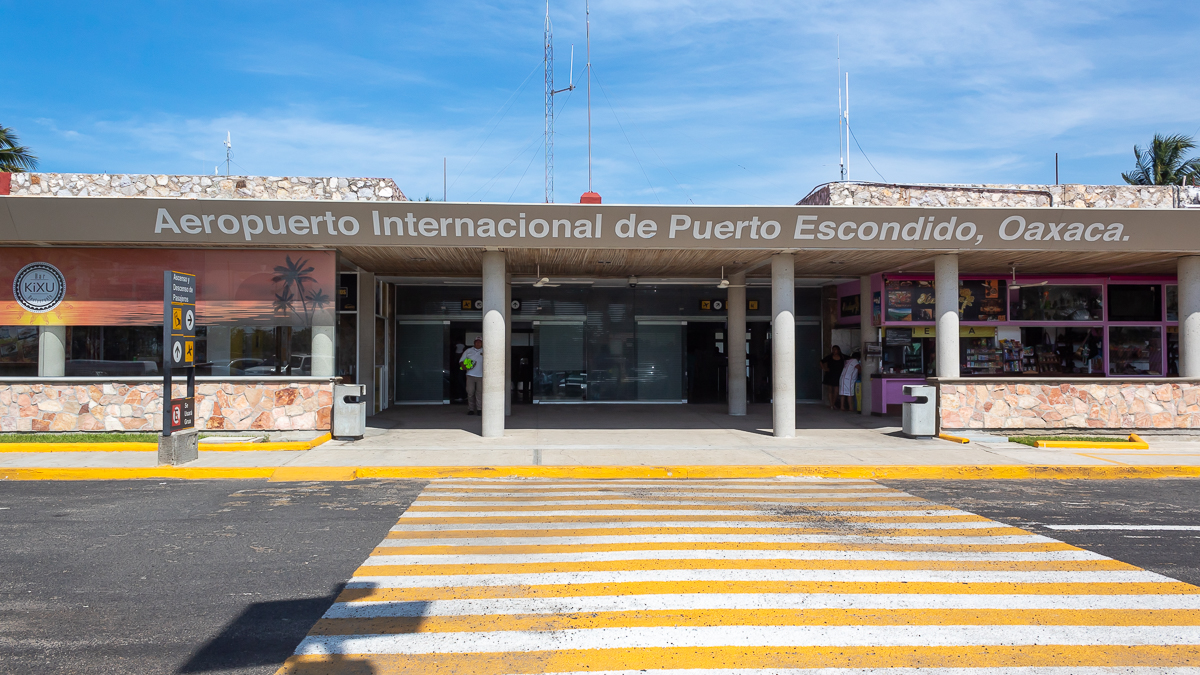
- IATA: PXM; ICAO: MMPS

Summary
- Airport type: Public
- Owner/Operator: Aeropuertos Mexicanos
- Serves: Puerto Escondido, Oaxaca, Mexico
- Time zone: CST (UTC−06:00)
- Elevation AMSL: 88 m (289 ft)
- Coordinates: 15°52′36″N 097°05′20″W
- Website: wwww./amemx.site/aipe

Map
- Location of the airport in Oaxaca PXM (Mexico)

Runways
Direction	Length		Surface
Direction	m	ft	Surface
09/27	2,300	7,546	Asphalt

Statistics (2025)
- Total passengers: 948,590
- Ranking in Mexico: 28th ▲1
- Source: Agencia Federal de Aviación Civil

Puerto Escondido International Airport (Spanish: Aeropuerto Internacional de Puerto Escondido) (IATA: PXM, ICAO: MMPS) is an airport located in Puerto Escondido, Oaxaca, Mexico. It handles national and international air traffic for the city of Puerto Escondido and the Costa Region of Oaxaca on the Mexican Pacific coast. The airport was originally operated by Aeropuertos y Servicios Auxiliares, a federal government-owned corporation; in 2023, management was handed to Aeropuertos Mexicanos, a partner of the private-public entity Grupo Aeroportuario Turístico Mexicano.

It offers passenger services to seven domestic destinations and also supports various tourism, flight training, executive, and general aviation activities. The airport is one of the fastest-growing airports in the country, primarily due to the high popularity of Puerto Escondido as a tourist destination. In 2025, the airport handled 948,590 passengers, doubling 2019's traffic.

== Facilities ==
The airport is located at an elevation of 88 m above mean sea level and covers an area of 125 hectares (309 acres). It features one runway designated 09/27 with an asphalt surface that measures 2,300 by 45 metres (7,546 ft × 148 ft). The airport has three aircraft positions suitable for receiving narrow-body aircraft like the Boeing 737 and the Airbus A320. The one-story passenger terminal has small areas for departures and arrivals, parking facilities, car rental services, and small shops. Its official operating hours are from 7:00 AM to 7:00 PM. A new terminal is currently under construction on the southwest side of the airport, adjacent to the airport's existing apron.

== Airlines and destinations ==
=== Passenger ===
Airlines	Destinations
Aeroméxico	Mexico City–Benito Juárez
Aeroméxico Connect	Mexico City–Benito Juárez
Aerotucán	Oaxaca
Aerovega	Oaxaca
Air Canada Rouge	Seasonal: Toronto–Pearson, Vancouver (begins December 8, 2026)
American Eagle	Dallas/Fort Worth
United Express	Houston–Intercontinental
Viva	Guadalajara, Mexico City–Benito Juárez, Mexico City–Felipe Ángeles; Seasonal: Monterrey
Volaris	Guadalajara, Mexico City–Benito Juárez, Puebla (begins December 1, 2026), Tijuana
WestJet	Seasonal: Calgary

=== Destinations maps ===
Domestic destinations from Puerto Escondido International Airport
Red = Year-round destination
Blue = Future destination
Green = Seasonal destination
International destinations from Puerto Escondido International Airport
Red = Year-round destination
Blue = Future destination
Green = Seasonal destination

== Statistics ==
=== Annual Traffic ===
Passenger statistics at PXM
Year	Total Passengers	change %	Cargo movements (t)	Air operations
2006	66,278	Steady	188	5,380
2007	67,550	▲1.92%	174	5,521
2008	69,410	▲2.75%	193	5,802
2009	72,117	▲3.90%	146	6,193
2010	66,205	▼8.20%	138	5,802
2011	47,249	▼28.63%	6	4,862
2012	78,092	▲65.28%	10	5,640
2013	121,703	▲55.85%	35	5,973
2014	161,299	▲32.53%	32	6,712
2015	185,330	▲14.90%	14	6,742
2016	225,917	▲21.90%	26	7,112
2017	255,831	▲13.24%	50	7,359
2018	302,478	▲18.23%	73	7,447
2019	407,651	▲34.77%	99	8,704
2020	267,826	▼33.30%	53	6,568
2021	526,423	▲96.55%	56	9,961
2022	729,004	▲38.48%	52	11,815
2023	917,400	▲25.84%	3	11,196
2024	850,142	▼7.33%	145	8,500
2025	948,590	▲11.58%		7,886

=== Busiest routes ===
Busiest routes at PXM (Jan–Dec 2025)
4	Monterrey, Nuevo León	17,845
5	Houston–Intercontinental, United States	3,764
6	Mérida, Yucatán	1,239
7	Tijuana, Baja California	449
8	Dallas/Fort Worth, United States	423
9	Calgary, Canada	181

== Incidents ==
On 11 February 2024, a Cessna 208B Grand Caravan (Blackhawk XP42 conversion) force landed on a beach immediately after taking off from the Puerto Escondido Airport runway. One person on the beach was killed on impact and several plane occupants were injured.

== See also ==
- List of the busiest airports in Mexico
- List of airports in Mexico
- List of airports by ICAO code: M
- List of busiest airports in North America
- List of the busiest airports in Latin America
- Transportation in Mexico
- Tourism in Mexico
- Aeropuertos y Servicios Auxiliares
- List of beaches in Mexico
- Costa Region
- Playa de Escobilla Sanctuary
- Lagunas de Chacahua National Park
- Laguna de Manialtepec
- Oaxaca
