= Aerotucán =

Mexican airline

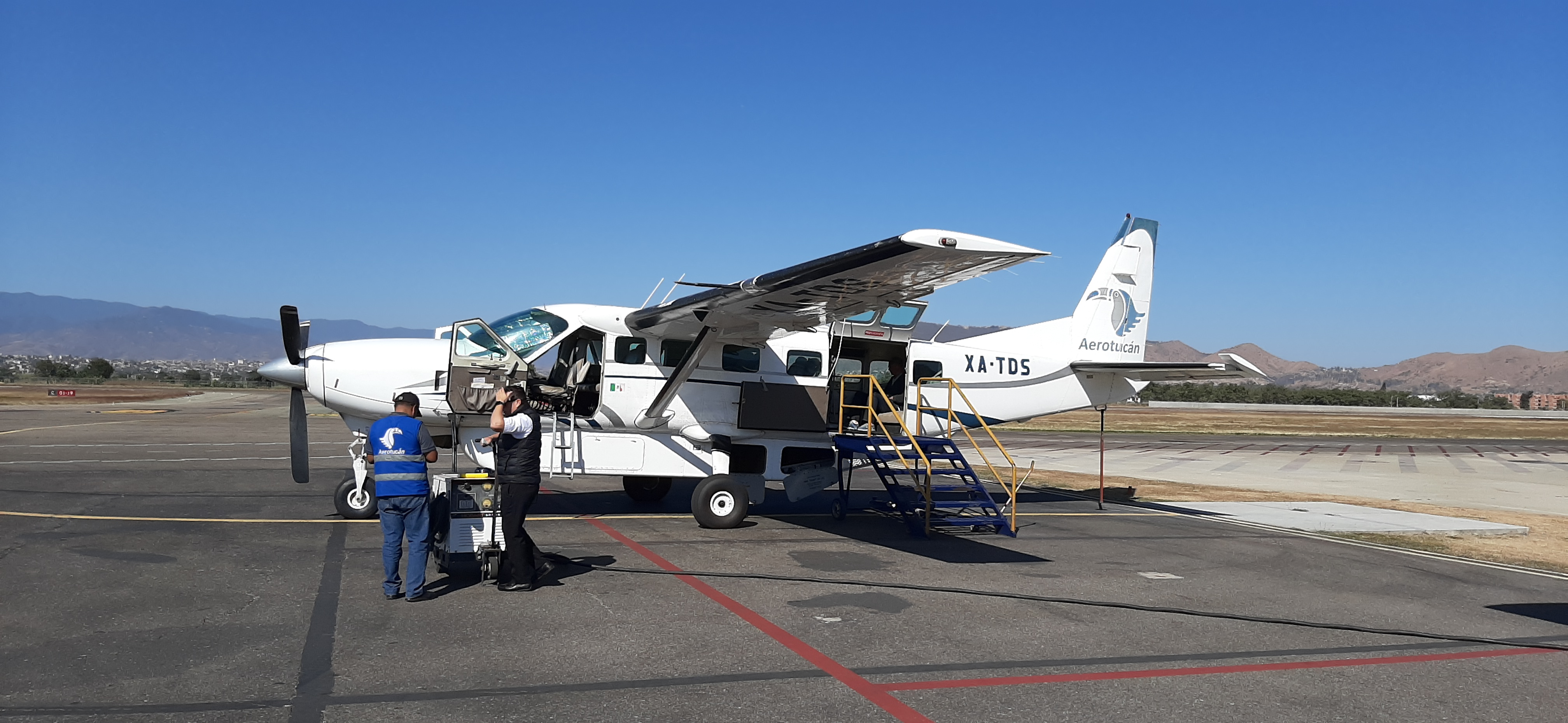
Aerotucan Cessna 208B Grand Caravan at Oaxaca's Xoxocotlan International Airport (2020)

Aerotucan is a Mexican airline based in Oaxaca, Oaxaca.

== History ==
The airline was founded in 2001 (25 years ago) and it began operations with a single Cessna Grand Caravan.

== Destinations ==
As of July 2023, Aerotucán serves the following domestic destinations:

- Huatulco
- Ixtepec
- Oaxaca
- Puerto Escondido

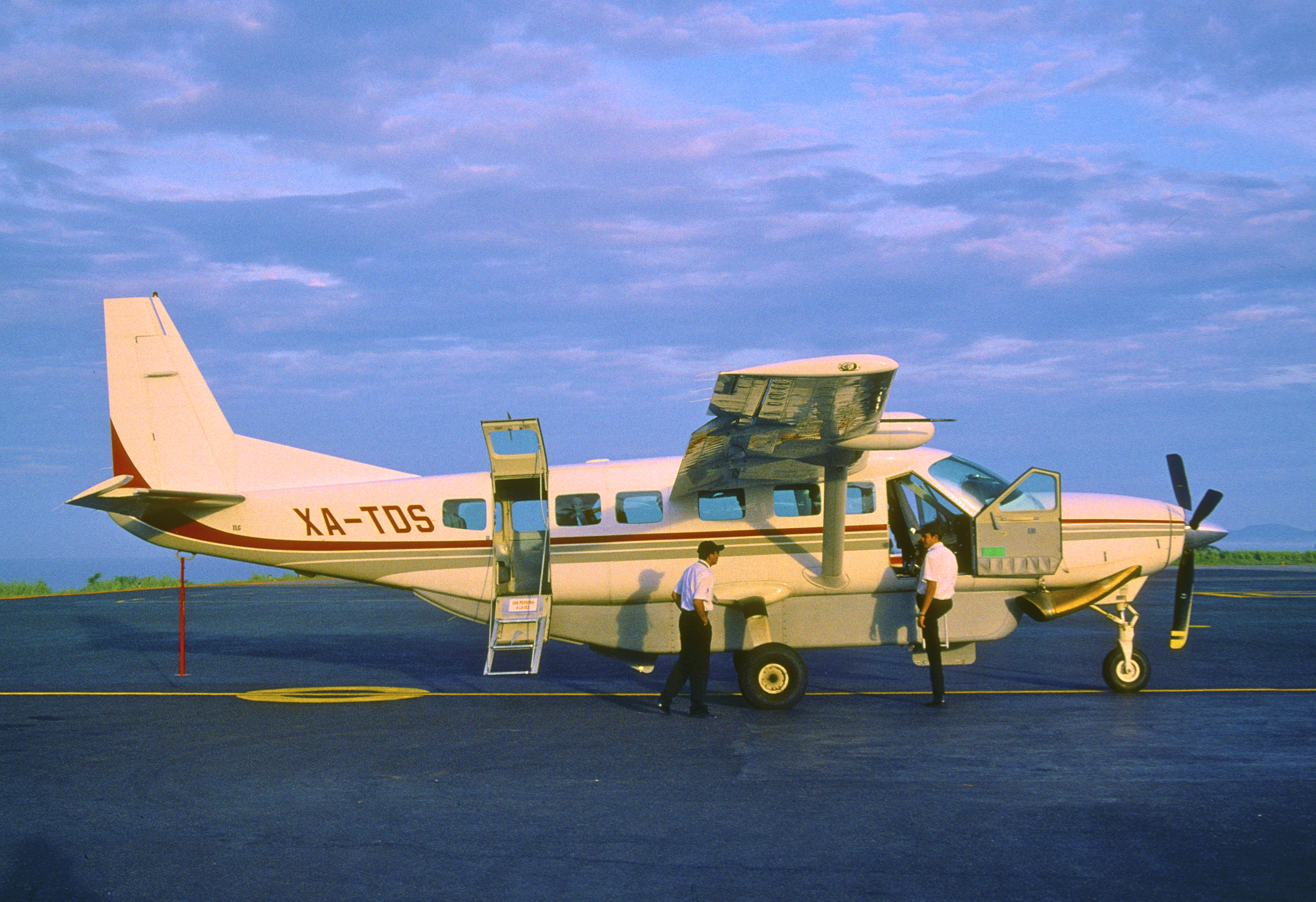
The same aircraft at Puerto Escondido International Airport (July 2003)

== See also ==
- List of active Mexican airlines
- Lists of airlines
