= List of Aeroméxico destinations =

Aeroméxico and Aeroméxico Connect, which are both commercialized as Aeroméxico, serve the following destinations, as of May 2026.

== Aeroméxico destinations ==
Country/Territory	City	Airport	Notes	Refs
Argentina	Buenos Aires	Ministro Pistarini International Airport		
Bahamas	Nassau	Lynden Pindling International Airport	Begins 19 March 2027	
Brazil	Rio de Janeiro	Rio de Janeiro/Galeão International Airport	Terminated	
Brazil	São Paulo	São Paulo/Guarulhos International Airport		
Canada	Calgary	Calgary International Airport	Terminated	
Canada	Montreal	Montréal–Trudeau International Airport		
Canada	Toronto	Toronto Pearson International Airport		
Canada	Vancouver	Vancouver International Airport		
Chile	Santiago	Arturo Merino Benítez International Airport		
China	Shanghai	Shanghai Pudong International Airport	Terminated	
Colombia	Bogotá	El Dorado International Airport		
Colombia	Cali	Alfonso Bonilla Aragón International Airport		
Colombia	Cartagena	Rafael Núñez International Airport		
Colombia	Medellín	José María Córdova International Airport		
Costa Rica	San José	Juan Santamaría International Airport		
Cuba	Havana	José Martí International Airport		
Dominican Republic	Punta Cana	Punta Cana International Airport		
Dominican Republic	Santo Domingo	Las Américas International Airport		
Ecuador	Quito	Mariscal Sucre International Airport		
Ecuador	Guayaquil	José Joaquín de Olmedo International Airport	Terminated	
El Salvador	San Salvador	El Salvador International Airport		
France	Paris	Charles de Gaulle Airport		
France	Paris	Orly Airport	Terminated	
Germany	Frankfurt	Frankfurt Airport	Terminated	
Guatemala	Guatemala City	La Aurora International Airport		
Italy	Rome	Leonardo da Vinci–Fiumicino Airport		
Italy	Milan	Milan Malpensa Airport	Begins 30 March 2027	
Jamaica	Montego Bay	Sangster International Airport	Begins 18 March 2027	
Japan	Tokyo	Narita International Airport		
Mexico	Acapulco	Acapulco International Airport		
Mexico	Aguascalientes	Aguascalientes International Airport		
Mexico	Cancún	Cancún International Airport		
Mexico	Chihuahua	Chihuahua International Airport		
Mexico	Ciudad del Carmen	Ciudad del Carmen International Airport		
Mexico	Ciudad Juárez	Ciudad Juárez International Airport		
Mexico	Cozumel	Cozumel International Airport		
Mexico	Culiacán	Culiacán International Airport		
Mexico	Guadalajara	Guadalajara International Airport	Hub	
Mexico	Hermosillo	Hermosillo International Airport		
Mexico	Huatulco	Bahías de Huatulco International Airport		
Mexico	León	Bajío International Airport		
Mexico	Mazatlán	Mazatlán International Airport		
Mexico	Mérida	Mérida International Airport		
Mexico	Mexicali	Mexicali International Airport		
Mexico	Mexico City	Mexico City International Airport	Hub	
Mexico	Monterrey	Monterrey International Airport		
Mexico	Oaxaca	Oaxaca International Airport		
Mexico	Puerto Vallarta	Licenciado Gustavo Díaz Ordaz International Airport		
Mexico	Reynosa	General Lucio Blanco International Airport		
Mexico	San José del Cabo	Los Cabos International Airport		
Mexico	Tapachula	Tapachula International Airport		
Mexico	Tijuana	Tijuana International Airport		
Mexico	Torreón	Torreón International Airport		
Mexico	Tulum	Tulum International Airport		
Mexico	Tuxtla Gutiérrez	Tuxtla Gutiérrez International Airport		
Mexico	Veracruz	Veracruz International Airport		
Mexico	Villahermosa	Villahermosa International Airport		
Netherlands	Amsterdam	Amsterdam Airport Schiphol		
Nicaragua	Managua	Augusto C. Sandino International Airport		
Panama	Panama City	Tocumen International Airport		
Peru	Lima	Jorge Chávez International Airport		
Puerto Rico	San Juan	Luis Muñoz Marín International Airport	Resumes 24 June 2027	
South Korea	Seoul	Incheon International Airport		
Spain	Barcelona	Josep Tarradellas Barcelona–El Prat Airport		
Spain	Madrid	Madrid–Barajas Airport		
United Kingdom	London	Heathrow Airport		
United States	Albuquerque	Albuquerque International Sunport	Terminated	
United States	Atlanta	Hartsfield–Jackson Atlanta International Airport	Terminated	
United States	Austin	Austin–Bergstrom International Airport		
United States	Boston	Logan International Airport		
United States	Brownsville	Brownsville/South Padre Island International Airport	Terminated	
United States	Chicago	O'Hare International Airport		
United States	Dallas	Dallas/Fort Worth International Airport		
United States	Denver	Denver International Airport		
United States	Detroit	Detroit Metropolitan Airport	Terminated	
United States	Fort Lauderdale	Fort Lauderdale–Hollywood International Airport	Begins 14 January 2027	
United States	Fresno	Fresno Yosemite International Airport		
United States	Houston	George Bush Intercontinental Airport		
United States	Laredo	Laredo International Airport	Terminated	
United States	Las Vegas	Harry Reid International Airport		
United States	Los Angeles	Los Angeles International Airport		
United States	Miami	Miami International Airport		
United States	Newark	Newark Liberty International Airport		
United States	New Orleans	Louis Armstrong New Orleans International Airport	Terminated	
United States	New York City	John F. Kennedy International Airport		
United States	Orange County	John Wayne Airport	Begins 11 January 2027	
United States	Orlando	Orlando International Airport		
United States	Philadelphia	Philadelphia International Airport		
United States	Phoenix	Phoenix Sky Harbor International Airport		
United States	Portland	Portland International Airport	Resumes 21 January 2027	
United States	Raleigh	Raleigh–Durham International Airport		
United States	Sacramento	Sacramento International Airport		
United States	Salt Lake City	Salt Lake City International Airport		
United States	San Antonio	San Antonio International Airport		
United States	San Diego	San Diego International Airport	Terminated	
United States	San Francisco	San Francisco International Airport		
United States	San Jose	San Jose International Airport	Terminated	
United States	Seattle	Seattle–Tacoma International Airport		
United States	Tucson	Tucson International Airport	Terminated	
United States	Washington, D.C.	Dulles International Airport		
Venezuela	Caracas	Simon Bolivar International Airport	Terminated	

== Aeroméxico Connect destinations ==
Aeroméxico Connect serves the following destinations (as of May 2026):

Country	City	Airport	Notes	Refs
Belize	Belize City	Philip S. W. Goldson International Airport	Terminated	
Colombia	Medellín	José María Córdova International Airport	Terminated	
Costa Rica	Liberia	Guanacaste Airport	Terminated	
Cuba	Havana	José Martí International Airport	Terminated	
Dominican Republic	Punta Cana	Punta Cana International Airport	Terminated	
Dominican Republic	Santo Domingo	Las Américas International Airport		
El Salvador	San Salvador	El Salvador International Airport		
Guatemala	Guatemala City	La Aurora International Airport		
Honduras	San Pedro Sula	Ramón Villeda Morales International Airport		
Honduras	Tegucigalpa	Comayagua International Airport		
Mexico	Acapulco	Acapulco International Airport		
Mexico	Aguascalientes	Aguascalientes International Airport		
Mexico	Campeche	Campeche International Airport		
Mexico	Cancún	Cancún International Airport		
Mexico	Chetumal	Chetumal International Airport		
Mexico	Chihuahua	Chihuahua International Airport		
Mexico	Ciudad Juárez	Ciudad Juárez International Airport		
Mexico	Ciudad del Carmen	Ciudad del Carmen International Airport		
Mexico	Ciudad Obregón	Ciudad Obregón International Airport		
Mexico	Ciudad Victoria	Ciudad Victoria International Airport	Terminated	
Mexico	Colima	Colima Airport		
Mexico	Cozumel	Cozumel International Airport		
Mexico	Culiacán	Culiacán International Airport		
Mexico	Durango	Durango International Airport		
Mexico	Guadalajara	Guadalajara International Airport		
Mexico	Hermosillo	Hermosillo International Airport		
Mexico	Huatulco	Bahías de Huatulco International Airport		
Mexico	Ixtapa	Ixtapa-Zihuatanejo International Airport		
Mexico	La Paz	La Paz International Airport		
Mexico	León/El Bajío	Bajío International Airport		
Mexico	Los Mochis	Los Mochis International Airport		
Mexico	Manzanillo	Playa de Oro International Airport		
Mexico	Matamoros	Matamoros International Airport		
Mexico	Mazatlán	Mazatlán International Airport		
Mexico	Mérida	Mérida International Airport		
Mexico	Mexicali	Mexicali International Airport		
Mexico	Mexico City	Mexico City International Airport	Hub	
Mexico	Mexico City	Felipe Ángeles International Airport		
Mexico	Minatitlán	Minatitlán International Airport		
Mexico	Monterrey	Monterrey International Airport		
Mexico	Morelia	General Francisco Mujica International Airport		
Mexico	Nuevo Laredo	Nuevo Laredo International Airport		
Mexico	Oaxaca	Oaxaca International Airport		
Mexico	Poza Rica	El Tajín National Airport	Terminated	
Mexico	Puebla	Puebla International Airport	Terminated	
Mexico	Puerto Escondido	Puerto Escondido International Airport		
Mexico	Puerto Vallarta	Licenciado Gustavo Díaz Ordaz International Airport		
Mexico	Querétaro	Querétaro Intercontinental Airport		
Mexico	Reynosa	General Lucio Blanco International Airport		
Mexico	Saltillo	Saltillo Airport	Resumes 18 March 2027	
Mexico	San José del Cabo	Los Cabos International Airport		
Mexico	San Luis Potosí	San Luis Potosí International Airport		
Mexico	Tampico	Tampico International Airport		
Mexico	Tapachula	Tapachula International Airport		
Mexico	Tepic	Tepic International Airport		
Mexico	Tijuana	Tijuana International Airport		
Mexico	Toluca	Toluca International Airport	Terminated	
Mexico	Torreón	Torreón International Airport		
Mexico	Tulum	Tulum International Airport	Terminated	
Mexico	Tuxtla Gutiérrez	Tuxtla Gutiérrez International Airport		
Mexico	Veracruz	Veracruz International Airport		
Mexico	Villahermosa	Villahermosa International Airport		
Mexico	Zacatecas	Zacatecas International Airport		
Nicaragua	Managua	Augusto C. Sandino International Airport		
Panama	Panama City	Tocumen International Airport		
United States	Atlanta	Hartsfield–Jackson Atlanta International Airport		
United States	Austin	Austin–Bergstrom International Airport		
United States	Chicago	O'Hare International Airport	Terminated	
United States	Dallas	Dallas/Fort Worth International Airport		
United States	Denver	Denver International Airport	Terminated	
United States	Detroit	Detroit Metropolitan Airport		
United States	Houston	George Bush Intercontinental Airport		
United States	Las Vegas	Harry Reid International Airport	Terminated	
United States	Los Angeles	Los Angeles International Airport		
United States	McAllen	McAllen Miller International Airport	Terminated	
United States	Nashville	Nashville International Airport	Begins 13 June 2027	
United States	New Orleans	Louis Armstrong New Orleans International Airport	Begins 17 June 2027	
United States	New York City	John F. Kennedy International Airport	Terminated	
United States	Orlando	Orlando International Airport	Terminated	
United States	Raleigh	Raleigh–Durham International Airport		
United States	Salt Lake City	Salt Lake City International Airport		
United States	San Antonio	San Antonio International Airport		
United States	Tampa	Tampa International Airport		
