= Aeropuertos y Servicios Auxiliares =

- Type: Government-owned company
- Industry: Air transport
- Founded: July 10, 1965
- Headquarters: Mexico City, Mexico
- Key people: Carlos Manuel Merino Campos (CEO)
- Products: Airport operations and services, aviation fuel
- Number of employees: 2500
- Website: www.gob.mx/asa

Aeropuertos y Servicios Auxiliares (ASA) is a Mexican Federal Government-owned company with its own equity capital and legal identity. It has its headquarters in Mexico City in Venustiano Carranza, Mexico City. It was set up in June 1965 to oversee management, operations and development of Mexico's airports. It operated 10 airports and part-operated another 4. It also provides aviation fuel at 63 locations.

== Airports ==
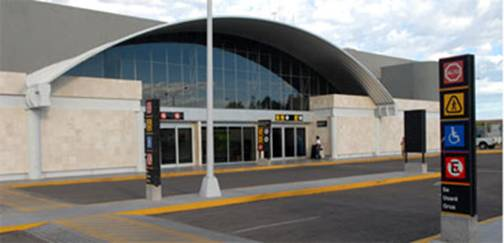
Ciudad Obregón Airport

Airport	City	State	ICAO	IATA
Ciudad del Carmen International Airport	Ciudad del Carmen	Campeche	MMCE	CME
Ciudad Obregón International Airport	Ciudad Obregón	Sonora	MMCN	CEN
Colima Airport	Colima	Colima	MMIA	CLQ
Guaymas International Airport	Guaymas	Sonora	MMGM	GYM
Loreto International Airport	Loreto	Baja California Sur	MMLT	LTO
Matamoros International Airport	Matamoros	Tamaulipas	MMMA	MAM
El Tajín National Airport	Poza Rica	Veracruz	MMPA	PAZ
Puerto Escondido International Airport	Puerto Escondido	Oaxaca	MMPS	PXM
Tehuacán Airport	Tehuacán	Puebla	MMHC	TCN
Tepic International Airport	Tepic	Nayarit	MMEP	TPQ

=== Map ===
Airports operated by ASA
Purple = Major airports (over 5 million passengers)
Red = International and domestic service
Green = Domestic service only
Grey = Unscheduled

== Passenger numbers ==
Number of passengers at each airport by 2023:

Rank	Airport	City	State	Passengers
1	Puebla International Airport	Puebla	Puebla	935,500
2	Puerto Escondido International Airport	Puerto Escondido	Oaxaca	917,400
3	Ciudad Obregón International Airport	Ciudad Obregón	Sonora	426,648
4	Ciudad del Carmen International Airport	Ciudad del Carmen	Campeche	342,737
5	Chetumal International Airport	Chetumal	Quintana Roo	335,088
6	Tepic International Airport	Tepic	Nayarit	244,531
7	Colima Airport	Colima	Colima	201,243
8	Nuevo Laredo International Airport	Nuevo Laredo	Tamaulipas	197,673
9	Uruapan International Airport	Uruapan	Michoacán	173,005
10	Loreto International Airport	Loreto	Baja California Sur	169,228
11	Campeche International Airport	Campeche	Campeche	107,892
12	Matamoros International Airport	Matamoros	Tamaulipas	60,559
13	Ciudad Victoria International Airport	Ciudad Victoria	Tamaulipas	29,327
14	Guaymas International Airport	Guaymas	Sonora	5,666
15	El Tajín National Airport	Poza Rica	Veracruz	3,050
16	Tehuacán Airport	Tehuacán	Puebla	2,017
17	Nogales International Airport	Nogales	Sonora	1,933
18	Tamuín National Airport	Tamuín	San Luis Potosí	1,630
19	Ixtepec Airport	Ixtepec	Oaxaca	1,366
Total				4,156,493

== See also ==
- List of airports in Mexico
- List of the busiest airports in Mexico
- Busiest airports in North America
- Busiest airports in Latin America
- Airfields in Baja California
- Airfields in Baja California Sur
- Small airstrips
- Military bases
- Air Force bases
- Naval air bases
- Lists of airports
- International airports
- Defunct airports
- Airports by ICAO code
- Airlines of Mexico
- Airline hubs
- Airline destinations
- Transportation in Mexico
- Tourism in Mexico
- Federal Civil Aviation Agency
- Grupo Aeroportuario del Sureste
- Grupo Aeroportuario del Pacífico
- Grupo Aeroportuario del Centro Norte
- Aeropuertos y Servicios Auxiliares
- List of busiest airports by passenger traffic
- Metropolitan areas of Mexico
