= Guaymas International Airport =

International airport in Guaymas, Sonora, Mexico

Guaymas International Airport Aeropuerto Internacional de Guaymas
- IATA: GYM; ICAO: MMGM

Summary
- Airport type: Public
- Operator: Aeropuertos y Servicios Auxiliares
- Serves: Guaymas, Sonora, Mexico
- Opened: 1972
- Time zone: MST (UTC−07:00)
- Elevation AMSL: 18 m (59 ft)
- Coordinates: 27°58′08″N 110°55′30″W
- Website: www.aeropuertosasa.mx/GYM

Map
- Location of the airport in Sonora GYM (Mexico)

Runways
Direction	Length		Surface
Direction	m	ft	Surface
02/20	2,350	7,710	Asphalt

Statistics (2025)
- Total passengers: 7,846
- Ranking in Mexico: 59th ▼1
- Source: Agencia Federal de Aviación Civil

Guaymas International Airport (Spanish: Aeropuerto Internacional de Guaymas), officially Aeropuerto Internacional General José María Yáñez (General José María Yáñez International Airport) (IATA: GYM, ICAO: MMGM), is an international airport located in Guaymas Municipality, Sonora, Mexico. It handles national and international air traffic for the city of Guaymas. Named after General José María Yáñez, a 19th-century military leader, the airport is operated by Aeropuertos y Servicios Auxiliares, a federal government-owned corporation. In 2024, it handled 7,846 passengers.

== History ==
Guaymas Airport was inaugurated in 1972, and its operations were integrated into the Aeropuertos y Servicios Auxiliares (ASA) holding company. In that same year, Hughes Airwest initiated a non-stop service to Tucson four days a week with a McDonnell Douglas DC-9-30 aircraft. The flight was part of the direct route Guaymas-Tucson-Phoenix-San José-San Francisco-Sacramento-Eugene-Portland-Seattle.

Aeromexico began flying daily to Guaymas in 1974 with McDonnell Douglas DC-9-15 and DC-9-30 aircraft on the route Mexico City-Guadalajara-Guaymas-Hermosillo-Tucson. In the mid-1980s, Aero California established flights between Guaymas and various cities in the Baja California peninsula using Douglas DC-3 aircraft. In the 1980s and 1990s, other cities with air connections to Guaymas included La Paz, Tijuana, Toluca, and Los Angeles.

US Airways used to fly to Phoenix, initially with Beechcraft 1900 and Bombardier Dash 8 aircraft, and later with Bombardier CRJ200 aircraft. The service was discontinued in 2012. In 2019, the regional airline Aeromar planned to open the route Guadalajara-Mazatlán-Guaymas-Tucson; however, this project never materialized, and the airline went bankrupt in the year 2023.

== Facilities ==
The airport is situated at an elevation of 18 metres (59 ft) above mean sea level, covering an area of 92 hectares (230 acres). It features a single asphalt runway, designated as 05/23, measuring 2,350 metres (7,710 ft). The commercial aviation apron spans 10,300 square metres (111,000 sq ft), featuring two parking positions for narrow-body aircraft and additional stands for general aviation. Official operating hours are from 7:00 to 19:00.

The passenger terminal caters to both domestic arrivals and departures in a single-story structure. It includes check-in areas, a security checkpoint, a baggage claim area, and an arrivals hall with car rental services, taxi stands, and several retail stores. The departures concourse includes two gates with direct access to the apron, allowing passengers to board their planes by walking to the aircraft. Adjacent facilities include parking areas, civil aviation hangars, administration offices, courier and logistic facilities, and facilities for general aviation.

Guaymas Airport also accommodates Guaymas Naval Air Base (Spanish: Base Aeronaval de Guaymas). This base includes hangars, aircraft stands, and military facilities owned by the Mexican Navy. Guaymas Naval Air Base hosts the 1st Interception and Reconnaissance Naval Air Squadron, operating L-90TP, MX-7-180A.

== Airlines and destinations ==
=== Passenger ===
Airlines	Destinations
Aéreo Servicio Guerrero	Guerrero Negro, Loreto

=== Destinations map ===
Destinations from Guaymas International Airport
Red = Year-round destination
Blue = Future destination
Green = Seasonal destination

== Statistics ==
=== Annual Traffic ===
Passenger statistics at Guaymas Airport
Year	Total Passengers	change %	Cargo movements (t)	Air operations
2006	38,899	Steady	-	8,224
2007	38,654	▼0.62%	-	8,344
2008	38,940	▲0.73%	1	8,812
2009	41,656	▲6.97%	0	8,703
2010	40,431	▼2.94%	-	7,664
2011	49,655	▲22.81%	2	8,898
2012	42,797	▼13.81%	-	7,164
2013	27,291	▼36.23%	-	6,009
2014	20,634	▼24.39%	-	5,367
2015	16,895	▼18.12%	-	4,685
2016	12,618	▼25.31%	-	4,347
2017	14,159	▲12.21%	-	5,233
2018	13,061	▼7.80%	-	4,831
2019	11,562	▼11.48%	-	4,066
2020	6,021	▼47.92%	-	2,749
2021	5,369	▼10.83%	-	2,289
2022	5,921	▲10.28%	-	2,421
2023	5,666	▼4.31%	-	2,415
2024	7,657	▲35.14%	-	2,809
2025	7,846	▲2.47%	27.83	2,913

== See also ==
- List of the busiest airports in Mexico
- List of airports in Mexico
- List of airports by ICAO code: M
- List of busiest airports in North America
- List of the busiest airports in Latin America
- Transportation in Mexico
- Tourism in Mexico
- Aeropuertos y Servicios Auxiliares
- Gulf of California
- List of Mexican military installations
- Mexican Air Force
- Mexican Naval Aviation
