= Ciudad del Carmen International Airport =

International airport in Ciudad del Carmen, Campeche, Mexico

Ciudad del Carmen International Airport Aeropuerto Internacional de Ciudad del Carmen
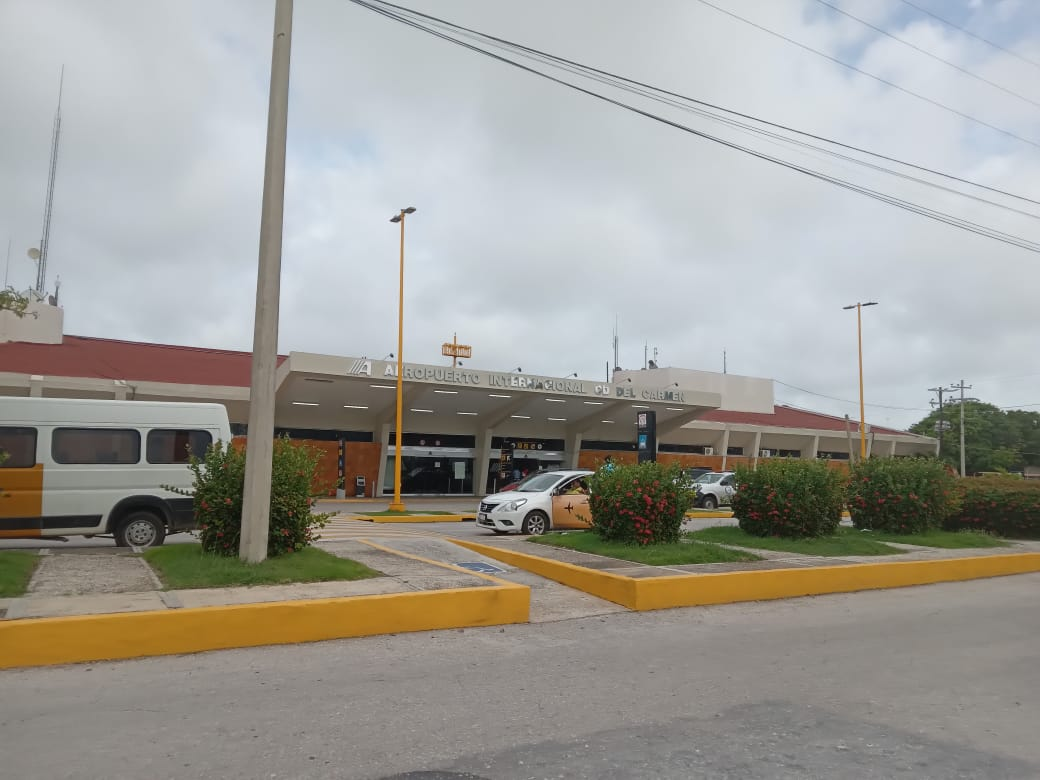
- IATA: CME; ICAO: MMCE

Summary
- Airport type: Public
- Operator: Grupo Aeroportuario Marina
- Serves: Ciudad del Carmen, Campeche, Mexico
- Opened: 1944
- Time zone: CST (UTC−06:00)
- Elevation AMSL: 3 m (9.8 ft)
- Coordinates: 18°39′13″N 091°47′56″W
- Website: www.aeropuertosasa.mx/CME

Map
- Location of airport in Campeche CME (Mexico)

Runways
Direction	Length		Surface
Direction	m	ft	Surface
13/31	2,200	7,218	Asphalt

Statistics (2025)
- Total passengers: 292,917
- Ranking in Mexico: 43rd
- Source: Agencia Federal de Aviación Civil

Ciudad del Carmen International Airport (Spanish: Aeropuerto Internacional de Ciudad del Carmen) (IATA: CME, ICAO: MMCE) is an international airport located in Ciudad del Carmen, Campeche, Mexico. It manages both national and international air traffic for the city of Ciudad del Carmen and western Campeche. The airport serves as a gateway for helicopter services within an industrial corridor connecting mainland Mexico to offshore oil fields in the Gulf of Mexico. It also supports cargo flights and various executive and general aviation activities. However, the recent contraction in oil industry activity in the area has had a negative impact on the airport's operations.

Operated by Grupo Aeroportuario Marina (GAM), a federal government-owned holding company, the airport handled 292,917 passengers in 2025, which was a 8% decrease from previous year.

== History ==
Before the construction of the current airport, Ciudad del Carmen operated Carranza Airport, which provided services for Mexicana de Aviación on the Veracruz-Villahermosa-Ciudad del Carmen-Mérida route since 1928.

The current airport was built in 1942, and it became operational on February 23, 1944, under an agreement with the United States to monitor the area during World War II. The construction cost of the airport was 9 million pesos. Its management became part of Aeropuertos y Servicios Auxiliares (ASA) in 1965.

The oil production boom and infrastructure development associated with the oil industry in the Gulf of Mexico significantly increased operations at the airport. For many decades, the airport offered services to other industrial cities in the Gulf region like Villahermosa, Poza Rica, and Reynosa, major cities like Monterrey, Guadalajara, and Cancun, and international flights to Houston by Continental Express, primarily serving the oil industry market.

Reaching a peak of 661,901 passengers in 2015, the airport has since experienced a decline with the downturn in oil and petrochemical activities in the region. In 2017, United Express canceled service to Houston. Despite a mild rebound in 2019, only 342,737 passengers passed through Ciudad del Carmen in 2023.

== Facilities ==
The airport is situated at an elevation of 3 metres (9.8 ft) above sea level, covering an area of 192 hectares (470 acres). It features a single asphalt runway, designated as 05/23, measuring 2,200 metres (7,200 ft) in length. The commercial aviation apron spans 10,484 square metres (112,850 sq ft), featuring three stands for narrow-body aircraft. Official business hours are from 7:00 to 19:00.

The passenger terminal, a single-story structure, caters to both domestic and international arrivals and departures. The departure facilities include check-in areas, a security checkpoint, and a departure concourse with two gates with direct access to the apron. The arrivals section features customs and immigration facilities, a baggage claim zone, and an arrivals hall with car rental services, taxi stands, and several retail stores. Adjacent facilities include parking areas, civil aviation hangars, cargo facilities, and spaces for general aviation.

Within the airport facilities, an independent terminal and a heliport with multiple helipads and hangars serve air connections catered for Pemex, connecting Ciudad del Carmen with offshore oil fields in the Gulf of Mexico. This heliport ranks as the number one in Mexico in terms of flight hours.

== Airlines and destinations ==
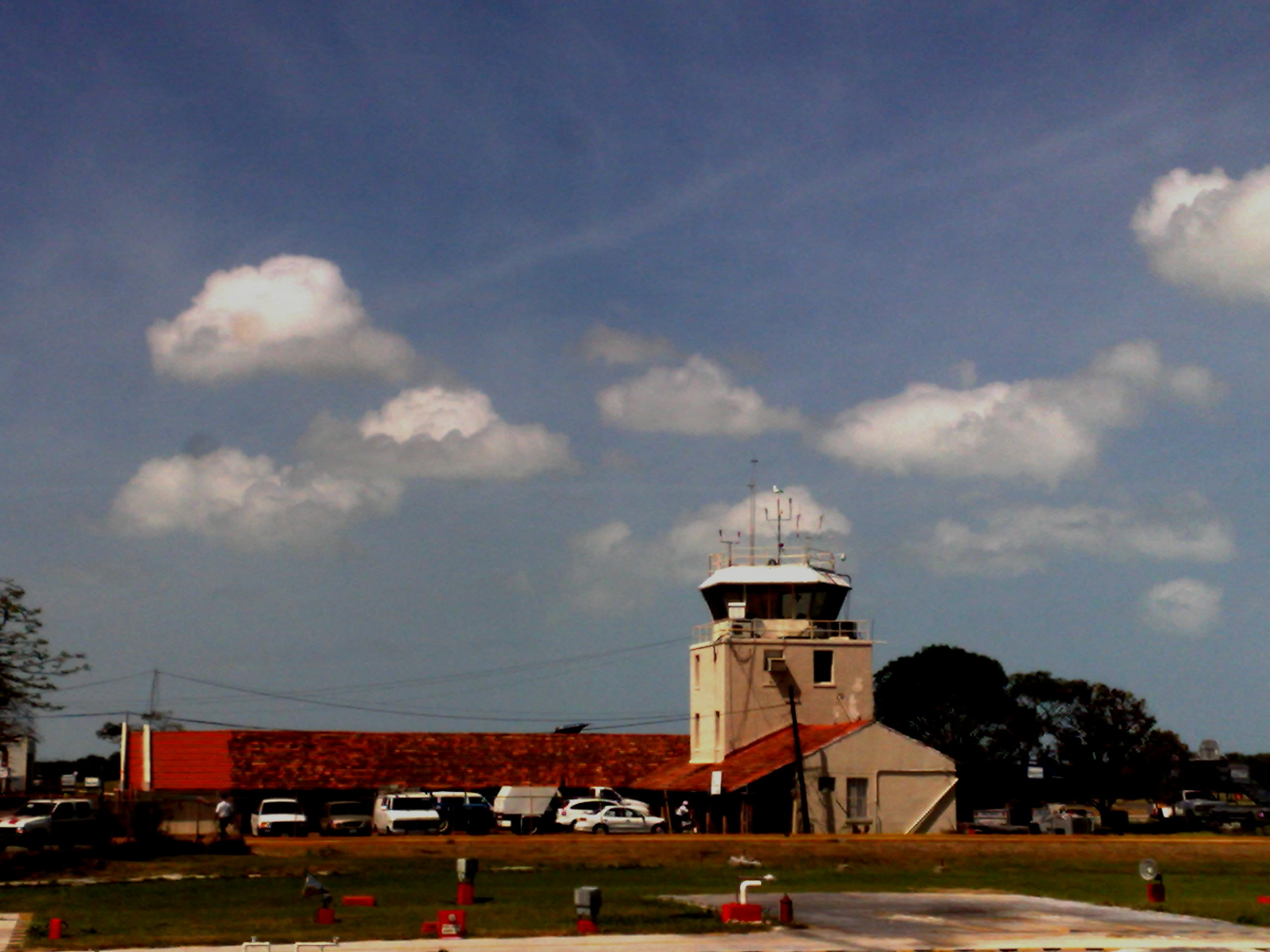
Control Tower

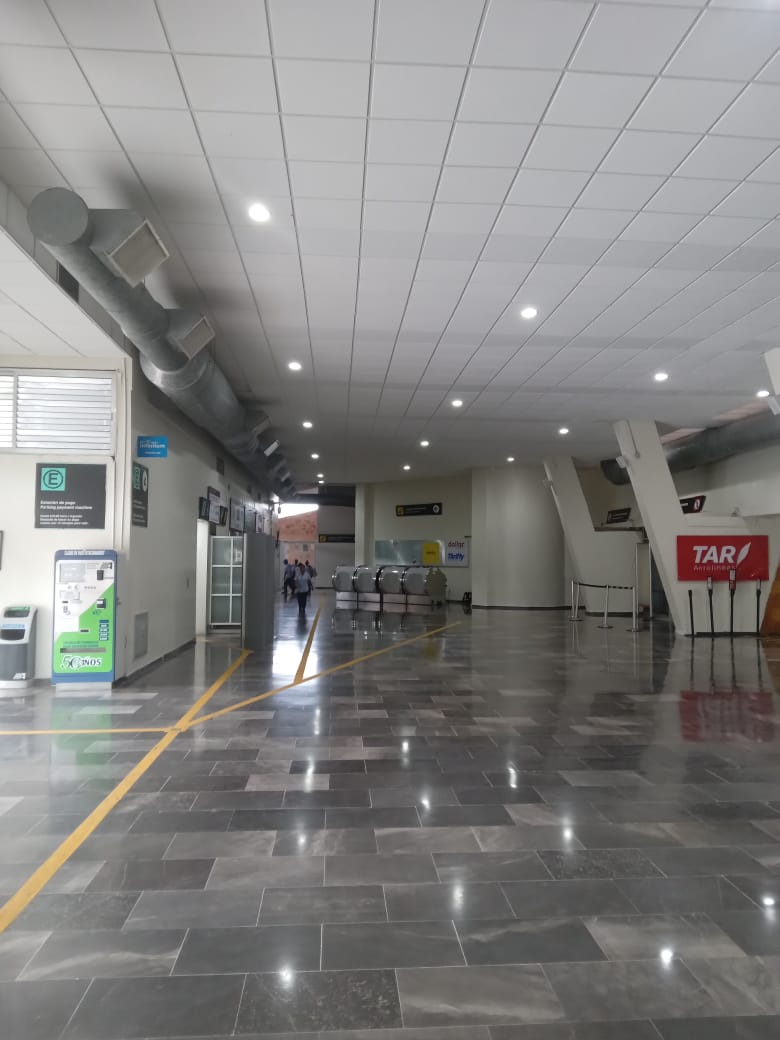
Arrivals hall

=== Passenger ===
Airlines	Destinations
Aeroméxico	Mexico City–Benito Juárez
Aeroméxico Connect	Mexico City–Benito Juárez

=== Destinations map ===
Destinations from Ciudad del Carmen International Airport
Red = Year-round destination
Blue = Future destination
Green = Seasonal destination

== Statistics ==
=== Annual Traffic ===
Passenger statistics at CME
Year	Total Passengers	change %	Cargo movements (t)	Air operations
2006	497,579	Steady	691	51,958
2007	566,500	▲13.85%	618	57,450
2008	586,950	▲3.60%	593	56,037
2009	558,642	▼4.82%	506	56,634
2010	507,386	▼9.17%	485	50,139
2011	516,205	▲1.73%	389	51,139
2012	587,339	▲13.78%	503	57,983
2013	548,941	▼6.53%	396	49,281
2014	661,901	▲20.57%	424	59,591
2015	623,154	▼5.85%	384	56,058
2016	459,497	▼26.26%	340	36,750
2017	362,795	▼21.04%	330	32,065
2018	362,663	▼0.04%	373	33,337
2019	401,316	▲10.66%	436	35,921
2020	260,074	▼35.19%	207	34,318
2021	322,401	▲23.96%	365	42,923
2022	339,294	▲5.24%	394	42,248
2023	342,737	▲1.01%	337	41,559
2024	318,782	▼6.99%	343	43,016
2025	292,917	▼8.11%	386	29,625

=== Busiest routes ===
Busiest routes from CME (Jan–Dec 2025)
Rank	Airport	Passengers
1	Mexico City, Mexico City	86,527
2	Minatitlán/Coatzacoalcos, Veracruz	384
3	Veracruz, Veracruz	32

== See also ==
- List of the busiest airports in Mexico
- List of airports in Mexico
- List of airports by ICAO code: M
- List of busiest airports in North America
- List of the busiest airports in Latin America
- Transportation in Mexico
- Tourism in Mexico
- Aeropuertos y Servicios Auxiliares
- Petroleum industry in Mexico
