= Tehuacán Airport =

Airport in Tehuacán, Puebla, Mexico

Tehuacán National Airport Aeropuerto Nacional de Tehuacán
- IATA: TCN; ICAO: MMHC

Summary
- Airport type: Public
- Operator: Aeropuertos y Servicios Auxiliares
- Serves: Tehuacán, Puebla, Mexico
- Time zone: CST (UTC-06:00)
- Elevation AMSL: 5,509 ft / 1,679 m
- Coordinates: 18°29′49″N 097°25′11″W
- Website: www.aeropuertosasa.mx/TCN

Map
- Location of airport in Puebla TCN (Mexico)

Runways
Direction	Length		Surface
Direction	m	ft	Surface
13/31	1,990	6,529	Asphalt

Statistics (2025)
- Total passengers: 1,872
- Source: Agencia Federal de Aeronáutica Civil

Tehuacán National Airport (Spanish: Aeropuerto Nacional de Tehuacán); officially Aeropuerto Nacional José Garci Crespo (José Garci Crespo National Airport) (IATA: TCN, ICAO: MMHC) is an airport in Tehuacán, Puebla, Mexico. It handles domestic air traffic and supports flight training and general aviation activities. The airfield does not provide scheduled passenger public services. The nearest airport that serves commercial flights is Puebla International Airport.

Operated by the state-owned Aeropuertos y Servicios Auxiliares, the airport was named after José Garci Crespo, a prominent entrepreneur from Tehuacán. In 2025, it handled 1,872 passengers, and in 2024, it served 2,005 passengers.

The airport is situated at an elevation of 1,679 metres (5,509 ft) above mean sea level, covering an area of 125 hectares (310 acres). It features a single asphalt runway, designated as 13/31, measuring 1,990 by 30 metres (6,529 by 98 ft). The commercial aviation apron spans 6,604 square metres (71,080 sq ft), featuring two parking positions for small aircraft and additional stands for general aviation.

The passenger terminal features arrival and departure facilities for domestic flights within a single-story building, with gates allowing passengers to walk to their aircraft. Adjacent facilities include small hangars and facilities for general aviation. Official operating hours are from 7:00 to 19:00.

== Statistics ==
=== Annual Traffic ===
Passenger statistics at Tehuacán Airport
Year	Total Passengers	change %	Cargo movements (t)	Air operations
2006	3,452	Steady	-	2,660
2007	4,040	▲17.03%	-	2,961
2008	3,355	▼16.96%	-	2,557
2009	2,926	▼12.79%	-	2,172
2010	3,106	▲6.15%	-	2,222
2011	3,977	▲28.04%	-	2,375
2012	3,232	▼18.73%	-	2,108
2013	3,248	▲0.50%	-	2,226
2014	3,101	▼4.53%	-	2,117
2015	2,812	▼9.32%	-	1,973
2016	3,487	▲24.0%	-	2,506
2017	3,877	▲11.18%	-	2,454
2018	2,844	▼26.60%	-	2,221
2019	2,825	▼0.67%	-	2,132
2020	1,749	▲38.09%	-	1,456
2021	2,176	▲24.41%	-	1,614
2022	2,156	▼0.92%	-	1,702
2023	2,017	▼6.45%	-	1,542
2024	2,005	▼0.59%	-	1,598
2025	1,872	▼6.63%	-	1,485

== See also ==
- List of the busiest airports in Mexico
- List of airports in Mexico
- List of airports by ICAO code: M
- List of busiest airports in North America
- List of the busiest airports in Latin America
- Transportation in Mexico
- Tourism in Mexico
- Puebla International Airport
