= Matamoros International Airport =

International airport in Matamoros, Tamaulipas, Mexico

Matamoros International Airport Aeropuerto Internacional de Matamoros
- IATA: MAM; ICAO: MMMA

Summary
- Airport type: Public
- Operator: Aeropuertos y Servicios Auxiliares
- Serves: Brownsville–Matamoros
- Location: Matamoros, Tamaulipas, Mexico
- Time zone: CST (UTC-06:00)
  - Summer (DST): CDT (UTC-05:00)
- Elevation AMSL: 8 m (26 ft)
- Coordinates: 25°46′12″N 097°31′31″W
- Website: www.aeropuertosasa.mx/MAM

Map
- Location of airport in Tamaulipas MAM (Mexico)

Runways
Direction	Length		Surface
Direction	m	ft	Surface
15/33	2,300	7,546	Asphalt

Statistics (2025)
- Total passengers: 107,489
- Ranking in Mexico: 52nd
- Source: Agencia Federal de Aviación Civil

Matamoros International Airport (Spanish: Aeropuerto Internacional de Matamoros); officially Aeropuerto Internacional General Servando Canales (General Servando Canales International Airport) (IATA: MAM, ICAO: MMMA) is an international airport located in Matamoros, Tamaulipas, Mexico, near the U.S.-Mexico border. It serves domestic flights within Mexico for the Brownsville-Matamoros binational metropolitan area, northern Tamaulipas and Southern Texas. It also supports various cargo operations, as well as executive and general aviation activities. Operated by Aeropuertos y Servicios Auxiliares, a state-owned holding company, Matamoros Airport was named after former Tamaulipas governor Servando Canales. The airport handled 65,306 passengers in 2024, increasing to 107,489 in 2025.

== Facilities ==
The airport is situated at an elevation of 8 metres (26 ft) above mean sea level, covering an area of 469 hectares (1,160 acres). It features a single asphalt runway, designated as 15/33, measuring 2,300 metres (7,500 ft). The commercial aviation apron spans 15,360 square metres (165,300 sq ft), featuring three parking positions for narrow-body aircraft and additional stands for general aviation. Official operating hours are from 8:00 to 20:00.

The passenger terminal caters to both domestic arrivals and departures in a single-story building. It includes check-in areas, a security checkpoint, a baggage claim area, and an arrivals hall with car rental services, taxi stands, and several retail stores. The departures concourse includes three gates with direct access to the apron, allowing passengers to board their planes by walking to the aircraft. Adjacent facilities include parking areas, civil aviation hangars, administration offices, cargo facilities, and facilities for general aviation.

The airport's proximity to the U.S. border makes it an attractive choice for cross-border travelers heading to Mexican cities. However, due to its close proximity to Brownsville and the high transportation taxes for international flights in Mexico, the airport only serves domestic destinations. Passengers traveling to destinations in the United States typically use Brownsville/South Padre Island International Airport.

== Airlines and destinations ==
=== Passenger ===
Airlines	Destinations
Aeroméxico Connect	Mexico City–Benito Juárez
Viva	Mexico City–Felipe Ángeles

=== Destinations map ===
Destinations from Matamoros International Airport
Red = Year-round destination
Blue = Future destination
Green = Seasonal destination

== Statistics ==
=== Annual Traffic ===
Passenger statistics at Matamoros Airport
Year	Total Passengers	change %	Cargo movements (t)	Air operations
2006	52,281	Steady	460	3,055
2007	52,281	Steady	323	3,566
2008	50,710	▼3.0%	235	3,731
2009	45,933	▼9.42%	190	3,089
2010	55,803	▲21.49%	172	4,973
2011	81,912	▲46.79%	206	5,874
2012	101,716	▲24.18%	210	6,885
2013	96,985	▼4.65%	290	6,680
2014	89,609	▼7.61%	260	6,297
2015	97,654	▲8.98%	266	7,480
2016	97,973	▲0.33%	278	6,386
2017	88,147	▼10.03%	312	4,787
2018	63,817	▼27.60%	280	3,607
2019	61,261	▼4.01%	516	3,230
2020	27,785	▼54.64%	142	1,810
2021	49,422	▲77.87%	0.3	2,194
2022	50,530	▲2.24%	3	1,960
2023	60,559	▲19.85%	2	2,531
2024	65,306	▲7.84%	0.5	2,976
2025	107,489	▲64.59%	0.7	2,138

== See also ==
- List of the busiest airports in Mexico
- List of airports in Mexico
- List of airports by ICAO code: M
- List of busiest airports in North America
- List of the busiest airports in Latin America
- Transportation in Mexico
- Tourism in Mexico
- Aeropuertos y Servicios Auxiliares
- Brownsville-Matamoros
- Mexico–United States border
- Brownsville/South Padre Island International Airport
