= Tamuín National Airport =

Airport in serving Ciudad Valles, San Luis Potosí, Mexico

Tamuín National Airport Aeropuerto Nacional de Tamuín
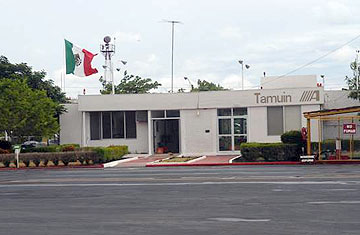
- IATA: TSL; ICAO: MMTN; LID: TMN

Summary
- Airport type: Public
- Operator: Grupo Olmeca-Maya-Mexica
- Serves: Tamuín and Ciudad Valles, San Luis Potosí, Mexico
- Location: Tamuín, San Luis Potosí, Mexico
- Time zone: CST (UTC-06:00)
- Elevation AMSL: 50 m / 164 ft
- Coordinates: 22°2′41.11″N 98°48′20.57″W
- Website: www.grupomundomaya.com/TSL

Map
- Location of airport in San Luis Potosí TSL (Mexico)

Runways
Direction	Length		Surface
Direction	m	ft	Surface
16/34	1,443	4,734	Asphalt

Statistics (2025)
- Total passengers: 1,361
- Ranking in Mexico: 61st
- Source: Agencia Federal de Aviación Civil

Tamuín National Airport (Spanish: Aeropuerto Nacional de Tamuín) (IATA: TSL, ICAO: MMTN) is a regional airport located in Tamuín, San Luis Potosí, Mexico. It facilitates national air traffic for the eastern San Luis Potosí region, including Ciudad Valles. Over the years, the airport has experienced intermittent service by regional airlines, providing seasonal flights within the region and to Mexico City. Aeromar initiated commercial operations at this airport from 2019 to 2020, resulting in an increased passenger count to 4,745. Currently, the airport does not have scheduled passenger public services. The nearest airport that serves commercial flights is Tampico International Airport.

Situated at an elevation of 50 metres (160 ft) above mean sea level, the airport covers an area of 130 hectares (320 acres). It features a single asphalt runway, designated as 16/34, measuring 1,443 metres (4,734 ft). The commercial aviation apron has one parking position for regional passenger aircraft and additional stands for general aviation. The terminal is small, serving arrivals and departures of regional flights. Adjacent facilities include parking areas, civil aviation hangars, administration offices, courier and logistic facilities, and areas for general aviation. Operating hours are from 7:00 to 19:00.

Previously under the management of Aeropuertos y Servicios Auxiliares (ASA), the airport has been operated by Grupo Olmeca-Maya-Mexica (OMM) since 2023, a holding company owned by the Mexican military.

In terms of passenger traffic, the airport handled 1,361 passengers in 2025 and 1,594 passengers in 2024.

== Statistics ==
=== Annual Traffic ===
Passenger statistics at Tamuín Airport
Year	Total Passengers	change %	Cargo movements (t)	Air operations
2006	2,549	Steady	-	1,359
2007	2,622	▲2.86%	-	1,577
2008	3,443	▲31.31%	-	1,841
2009	2,186	▼36.51%	-	1,528
2010	1,091	▼50.09%	-	946
2011	1,995	▲82.86%	-	1,251
2012	2,129	▲6.72%	-	1,642
2013	1,842	▼13.48%	-	1,538
2014	1,467	▼20.36%	-	1,186
2015	1,597	▲8.86%	-	1,279
2016	1,961	▲22.79%	-	1,310
2017	1,783	▼9.08%	-	1,370
2018	1,338	▼25.00%	-	1,682
2019	4,745	▲254.63%	-	992
2020	2,135	▼55.01%	-	1,276
2021	1,545	▼27.63%	-	1,710
2022	1,701	▲10.10%	-	2,006
2023	1,630	▲4.36%	-	884
2024	1,594	▼2.21%	-	695
2025	1,361	▼14.62%	-	652

== See also ==
- List of the busiest airports in Mexico
- List of airports in Mexico
- List of airports by ICAO code: M
- List of busiest airports in North America
- List of the busiest airports in Latin America
- Transportation in Mexico
- Tourism in Mexico
- Tampico International Airport
