= MMIA =

MMIA may refer to:

- Murtala Muhammed International Airport, in Ikeja, Lagos State, Nigeria
- Colima Airport, in Mexico, ICAO airport code MMIA
