= El Lencero Airport =

Airport serving Xalapa, Veracruz, Mexico

Xalapa National Airport Aeropuerto Nacional de Xalapa
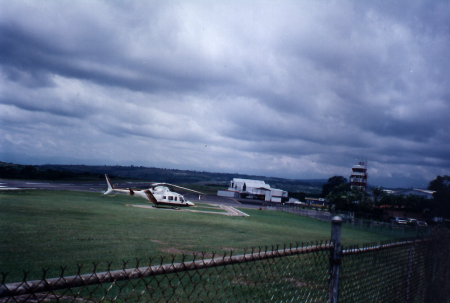
- IATA: JAL; ICAO: MMJA

Summary
- Airport type: Public
- Operator: Servicios Aeroportuarios de Veracruz
- Serves: Xalapa, Veracruz, Mexico
- Location: Emiliano Zapata, Veracruz, Mexico
- Time zone: CST (UTC-06:00)
- Elevation AMSL: 955 m / 3,133 ft
- Coordinates: 19°28′30″N 96°47′51″W

Map
- Location of airport in Veracruz JAL (Mexico)

Runways
Direction	Length		Surface
Direction	m	ft	Surface
08/26	1,700	5,577	Asphalt

Statistics (2023)
- Total passengers: N/A
- Source: Agencia Federal de Aviación Civil

Xalapa National Airport (Spanish: Aeropuerto Nacional de Xalapa); officially Aeropuerto El Lencero-Antonio Chedraui Caram (El Lencero-Antonio Chedraui Caram Airport) (IATA: JAL, ICAO: MMJA) is an airport located in Emiliano Zapata, Veracruz, Mexico. It serves national air traffic for the city of Xalapa. Operated by the state-owned Servicios Aeroportuarios de Veracruz, it is named after El Lencero, the small town outside of Xalapa where it is situated, and Antonio Chedraui, a notable entrepreneur from Xalapa. In terms of passenger statistics, Xalapa received 3,708 passengers in 2016 and 760 passengers in 2017, as reported by the Mexican Federal Aviation Administration.

Between 1998 and 2017, the airport operated daily flights to Mexico City, operated by Aeromar. However, since 2017, its services have been limited to handling flight training, executive, and general aviation activities. The airport does not offer scheduled passenger public flights. The closest airport providing commercial flights is Veracruz International Airport.

== Facilities ==
The airport is situated at an elevation of 955 metres (3,133 ft) above mean sea level, located 13 kilometres (8.1 mi) southeast of Xalapa. It features a single asphalt runway, designated as 08/26, measuring 1,700 by 30 metres (5,577 by 98 ft). Landing on Runway 08 requires executing a glide slope slightly steeper than normal, as the land rises to the west. Adjacent facilities include a small passenger terminal, several hangars, and an apron with helipads and parking positions for small aircraft. The airport has the capacity to handle up to 100,000 passengers annually.

Four miles south of the airport is the hill Chavarrillo, with an elevation of 1,165 metres (3,822 ft). Prevailing winds are consistently from the east-southeast throughout the year. During the polar front season (October to May), strong winds are typically from the north. The region often experiences fog and low ceilings. The AFIS UNICOM frequency is 123.3 MHz, operational from dawn to dusk. In 2013, plans were initiated for airport renovation and expansion, including the construction of a new runway; however, these plans were not implemented.

== Accidents and incidents ==
- On 21 February 2021, a Learjet 45XR operated by the Mexican Air Force crashed while taking off from El Lencero Airport, killing all six people on board.

== See also ==
- List of the busiest airports in Mexico
- List of airports in Mexico
- List of airports by ICAO code: M
- List of busiest airports in North America
- List of the busiest airports in Latin America
- Transportation in Mexico
- Tourism in Mexico
- Veracruz International Airport
