= Tepic International Airport =

International airport in Tepic, Nayarit, Mexico

Tepic International Airport Aeropuerto Internacional de Tepic-Riviera Nayarit
- IATA: TPQ; ICAO: MMEP

Summary
- Airport type: Public
- Operator: Aeropuertos Mexicanos
- Serves: Tepic, Nayarit, Mexico
- Time zone: MST (UTC-07:00)
- Elevation AMSL: 920 m (3,020 ft)
- Coordinates: 21°25′10.03″N 104°50′33.29″W
- Website: amemx.site/index.php/airn/

Map
- Location of airport in Nayarit TPQ (Mexico)

Runways
| Direction | Length | | Surface |
| Direction | m | ft | Surface |
|---|---|---|---|
| 02/20 | 3,100 | 10,171 | Asphalt |

Statistics (2025)
- Total passengers: 239,420
- Ranking in Mexico: 45th ▲1
- Source: Agencia Federal de Aviación Civil

Tepic International Airport (Spanish: Aeropuerto Internacional de Tepic-Riviera Nayarit); officially Aeropuerto Internacional Amado Nervo (Amado Nervo International Airport) (IATA: TPQ, ICAO: MMEP) is an international airport located in Tepic, Nayarit, Mexico. It serves the metropolitan area of Tepic and the entire state of Nayarit. It was the base for the regional airline Transportes Aereos de Nayarit before it ceased operations in 1999.

Previously managed by Aeropuertos y Servicios Auxiliares (ASA), a federal government-owned corporation, administration was handed over in 2024 to Aeropuertos Mexicanos, a partner of the private-public entity Grupo Aeroportuario Turístico MexicanoNamed after the locally-born poet Amado Nervo, the airport handled 211,447 passengers in 2024 and 239,420 passengers in 2025.

== Facilities ==
The airport covers an area of approximately 414 hectares (1,020 acres), with a commercial aviation apron of 16,200 square metres (174,000 sq ft). It features three parking positions and a 3,106 metres (10,190 ft) runway, suitable for accommodating narrow-body aircraft such as the Boeing 737 and Airbus A320. The official operating hours are from 6:00 to 21:00. The airport became part of the Aeropuertos y Servicios Auxiliares (ASA) network in 1991 and was officially designated as an international airport in 2009.

The terminal provides essential services, including check-in areas, arrivals facilities, car rental services, a restaurant, taxi stands, and a departure concourse with five gates. Adjacent to the terminal are parking areas, civil aviation hangars, and designated spaces for general aviation.

== Airlines and destinations ==
=== Passenger ===
| Airlines | Destinations |
|---|---|
| Aeroméxico Connect | Mexico City–Benito Juárez |
| Aéreo Servicio Guerrero | Seasonal: Puerto Balleto |
| United Express | Houston–Intercontinental |
| Viva | Mexico City–Felipe Ángeles |
| Volaris | Los Angeles, Tijuana |
| WestJet | Seasonal: Calgary |

=== Destinations map ===
Domestic destinations from Tepic International Airport
Red = Year-round destination
Blue = Future destination
Green = Seasonal destination
International destinations from Tepic International Airport
Red = Year-round destination
Blue = Future destination
Green = Seasonal destination

== Statistics ==
=== Annual Traffic ===
Passenger statistics at TPQ
| Year | Total Passengers | change % |
|---|---|---|
| 2006 | 96,588 | Steady |
| 2007 | 122,751 | ▲27.09% |
| 2008 | 91,810 | ▼25.21% |
| 2009 | 44,966 | ▼51.02% |
| 2010 | 37,503 | ▼16.60% |
| 2011 | 41,889 | ▲11.70% |
| 2012 | 50,742 | ▲21.13% |
| 2013 | 88,417 | ▲74.25% |
| 2014 | 111,253 | ▲25.83% |
| 2015 | 113,043 | ▲1.61% |
| 2016 | 148,367 | ▲31.25% |
| 2017 | 142,051 | ▼4.26% |
| 2018 | 163,183 | ▲14.8% |
| 2019 | 210,545 | ▲29.02% |
| 2020 | 132,588 | ▼37.03% |
| 2021 | 171,998 | ▲29.72% |
| 2022 | 205,617 | ▲19.55% |
| 2023 | 244,531 | ▲18.93% |
| 2024 | 211,447 | ▼13.53% |
| 2025 | 239,420 | ▲13.23% |

=== Busiest routes ===
Busiest routes from TPQ (Jan–Dec 2025)
| Rank | Airport | Passengers |
|---|---|---|
| 1 | Tijuana, Baja California | 67,863 |
| 2 | Mexico City, Mexico City | 27,048 |
| 3 | Mexico City–AIFA, State of Mexico | 13,091 |
| 4 | Los Angeles, United States | 8,504 |
| 5 | Calgary, Canada | 184 |
| 6 | Houston–Intercontinental, United States | 34 |

== See also ==
- List of the busiest airports in Mexico
- List of airports in Mexico
- List of airports by ICAO code: M
- List of busiest airports in North America
- List of the busiest airports in Latin America
- Transportation in Mexico
- Tourism in Mexico
- Aeropuertos y Servicios Auxiliares
