= Colima Airport =

International airport in Mexico

Colima International Airport Aeropuerto Internacional de Colima
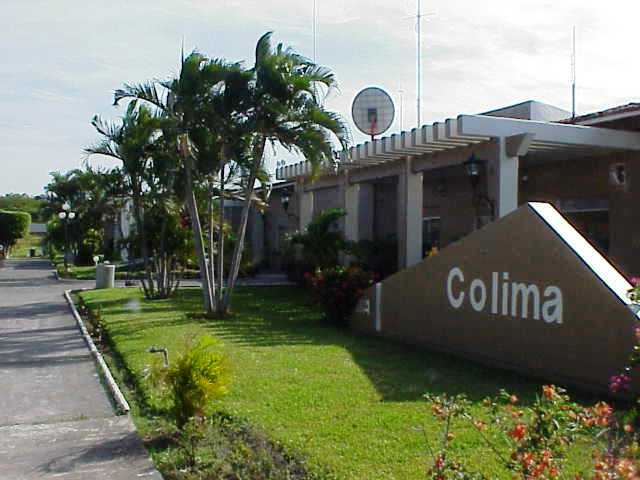
- IATA: CLQ; ICAO: MMIA

Summary
- Airport type: Public
- Operator: Grupo Aeroportuario de la Marina (SEMAR)
- Serves: Colima, Colima, Mexico
- Location: Cuauhtémoc, Colima, Mexico
- Opened: 17 September 1987; 38 years ago
- Time zone: CST (UTC−06:00)
- Elevation AMSL: 752 m (2,467 ft)
- Coordinates: 19°16′37″N 103°34′38″W
- Website: www.gob.mx/semar

Map
- Location of airport in Colima CLQ (Mexico)

Runways
Direction	Length		Surface
Direction	m	ft	Surface
07/25	2,300	7,546	Asphalt

Statistics (2025)
- Total passengers: 250,146
- Ranking in Mexico: 44th ▲1
- Source: Agencia Federal de Aviación Civil

Colima Airport (Spanish: Aeropuerto Internacional de Colima), officially Aeropuerto Internacional Licenciado Miguel de la Madrid (Licenciado Miguel de la Madrid International Airport) (IATA: CLQ, ICAO: MMIA), is an international airport in Colima, Mexico. It handles scheduled passenger flights and general aviation operations. The airport is named after former President of Mexico Miguel de la Madrid and was designated as an international airport in September 2025. It is operated by Grupo Aeroportuario de la Marina under the Secretaría de Marina (SEMAR).

== History ==
=== Construction and opening (1983-1988) ===
Construction of the airport began in 1983. The airport's first flight occurred on September 17, 1987, when an Aeroméxico DC-9 transported special guests for Governor Elías Zamora Verduzco's state address. On October 8, 1987, the Secretaría de Comunicaciones y Transportes (SCT) transferred the airport to Aeropuertos y Servicios Auxiliares (ASA) for operational management.

Scheduled commercial service began on 12 February 1988, and the airport was formally inaugurated by President Miguel de la Madrid on 11 March 1988.

=== Early operations and route development (1988-2008) ===
By 1989, Aero California had expanded service to include nonstop flights to Mexico City and Tijuana. On November 24, 1992, regional carrier Aeromar began daily service to Mexico City. By July 1999, Aeroméxico also operated four weekly flights to Mexico City and Tijuana, with Aeromar providing additional daily service as an Aeroméxico Connect partner.

On April 3, 2006, all Aero California operations were suspended by the Secretaría de Comunicaciones y Transportes for administrative and operational deficiencies. The airline resumed service on August 11, 2006, with Colima among the first destinations restored.

On July 23, 2008, Aero California was suspended again due to unpaid debts totaling 259.5 million pesos and never resumed operations. The airport handled 102,896 passengers in 2008, which dropped to 43,610 passengers in 2009, a 57% decline.

=== Recovery and expansion (2009-2023) ===
Following Aero California's closure, Aeromar became the primary carrier with service to Mexico City. Volaris entered the market on May 31, 2012, with service to Tijuana. Passenger traffic gradually recovered, reaching 138,962 by 2016.

Aeroméxico launched daily service on September 18, 2017, but discontinued it on June 30, 2018. Volaris added Mexico City service on November 15, 2018, operating three weekly flights. Passenger numbers reached 194,471 in 2019, the highest level prior to the COVID-19 pandemic.

The pandemic reduced passenger traffic to 105,671 in 2020. On February 15, 2023, Aeromar ceased operations after 35 years of service. Aeroméxico resumed service on March 16, 2023, and transferred its service to Felipe Ángeles International Airport on October 5, 2023. The airport handled 201,243 passengers in 2023 and reached a record 212,435 passengers in 2024.

=== International designation (2025) ===
On September 18, 2025, the airport was officially designated as international, with management transferred from ASA to Grupo Aeroportuario de la Marina under the Secretaría de Marina (SEMAR). A modernization project valued at 327 million pesos (US$17.5 million) commenced to expand capacity and improve facilities in preparation for international operations.

== Facilities ==
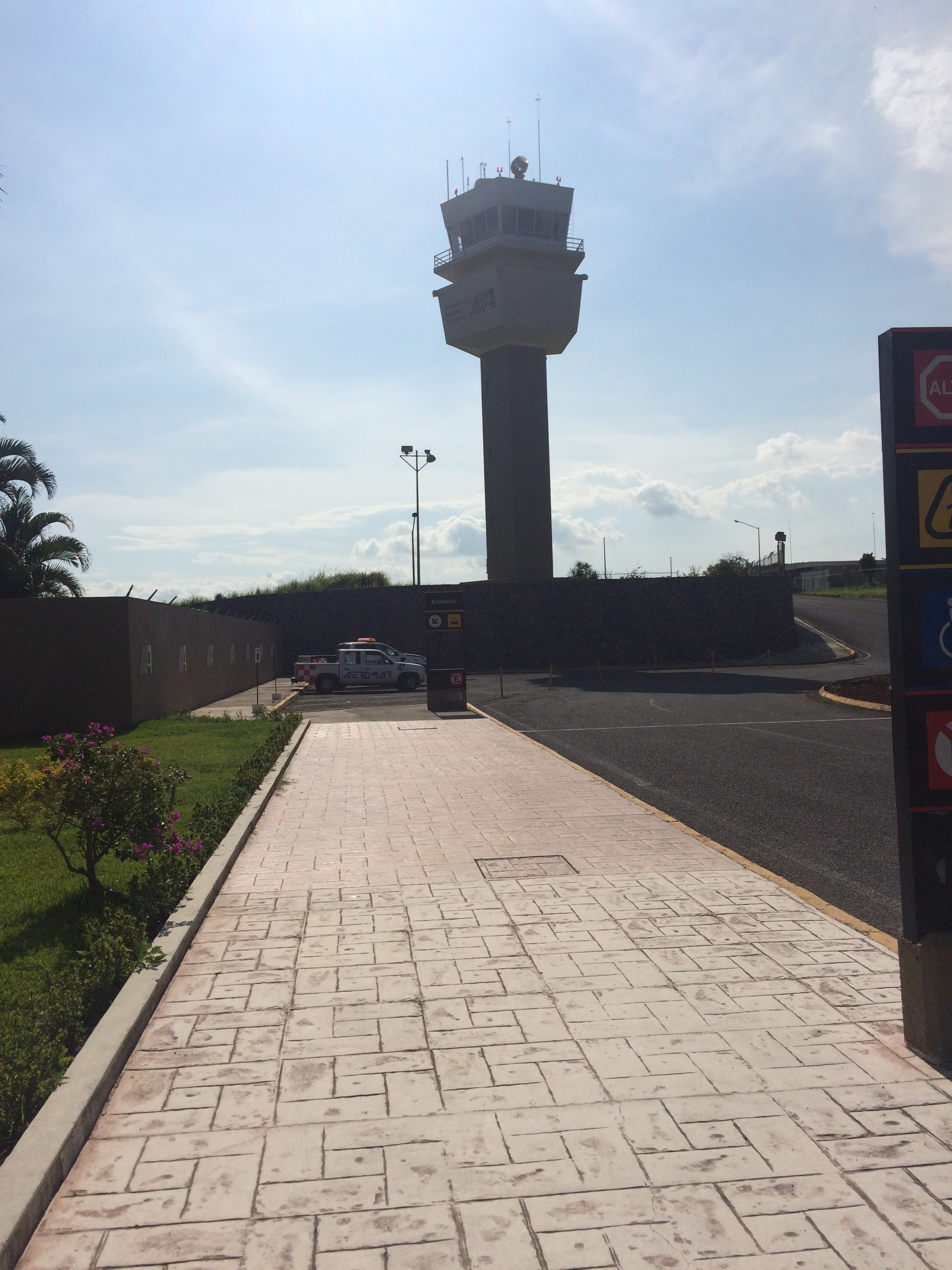
The control tower at CLQ

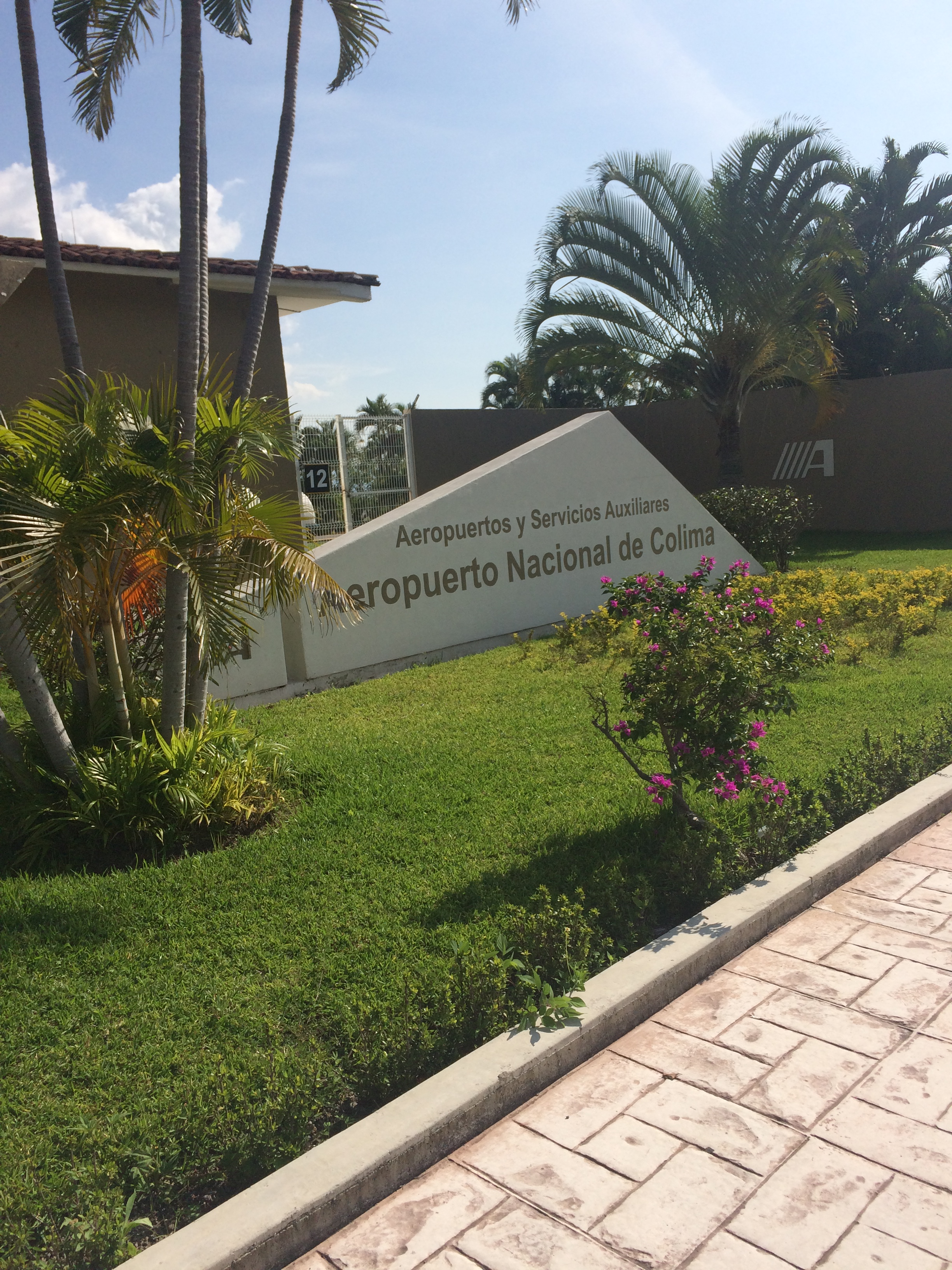
Passenger terminal landside

The airport is located at an elevation of 752 metres (2,467 ft) and covers an area of 386 hectares (950 acres). It has a single 2,300 metres (7,500 ft) asphalt runway designated 07/25. The apron measures 16,200 square metres (174,000 sq ft) and includes three parking positions for narrow-body aircraft, as well as spaces for smaller aircraft and helicopters.

The passenger terminal is a single-story facility handling both arrivals and departures. The terminal includes parking facilities, a check-in area with ticketing counters, security screening, a baggage claim area, and an arrivals hall with car rental services and taxi stands. The departure concourse has two gates with direct apron access, allowing passengers to board aircraft via walking.

In addition to commercial operations, the airport includes a cargo handling facility, a dedicated general aviation terminal for private and charter flights, and administrative offices.

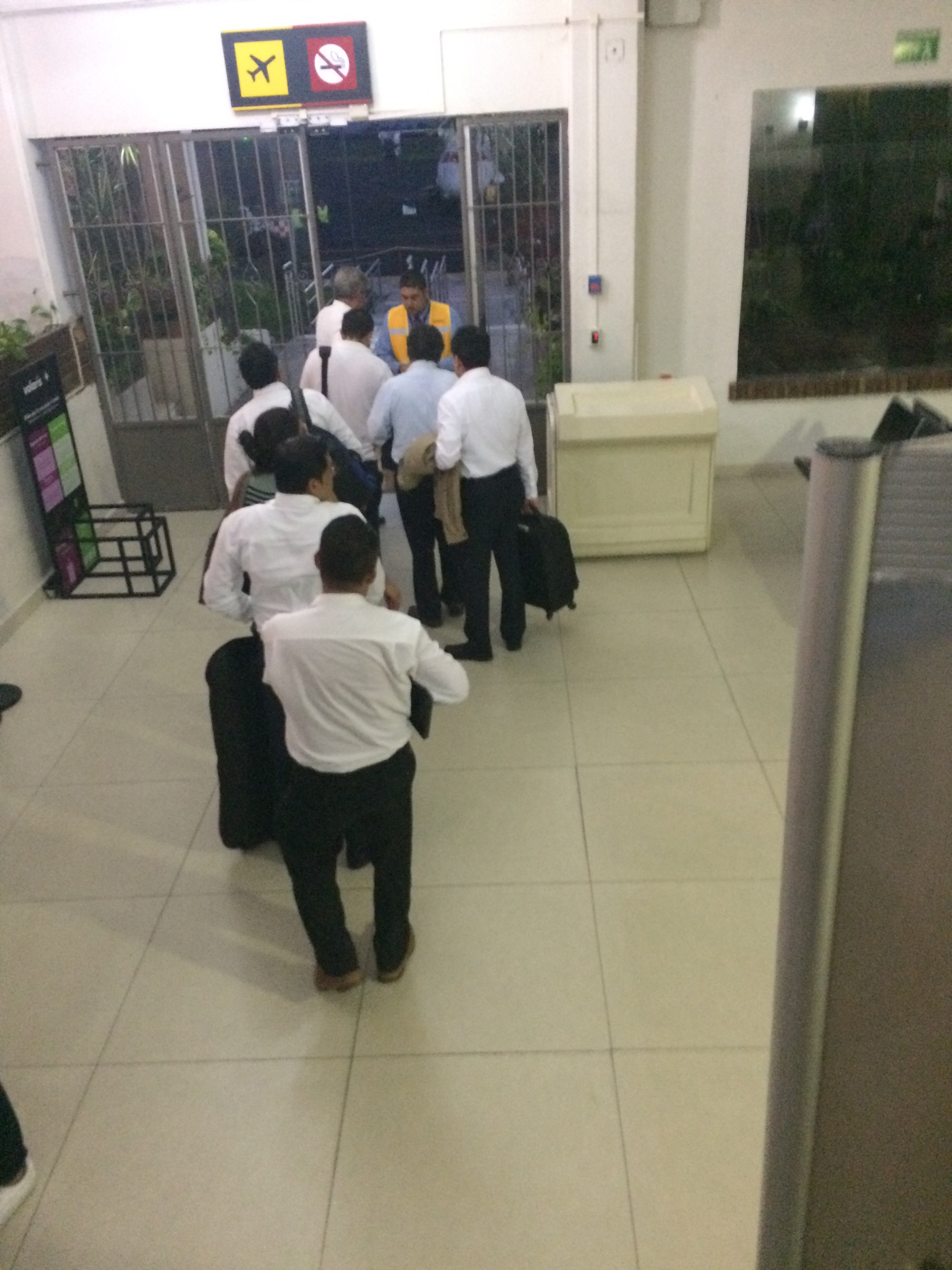
Departures concourse

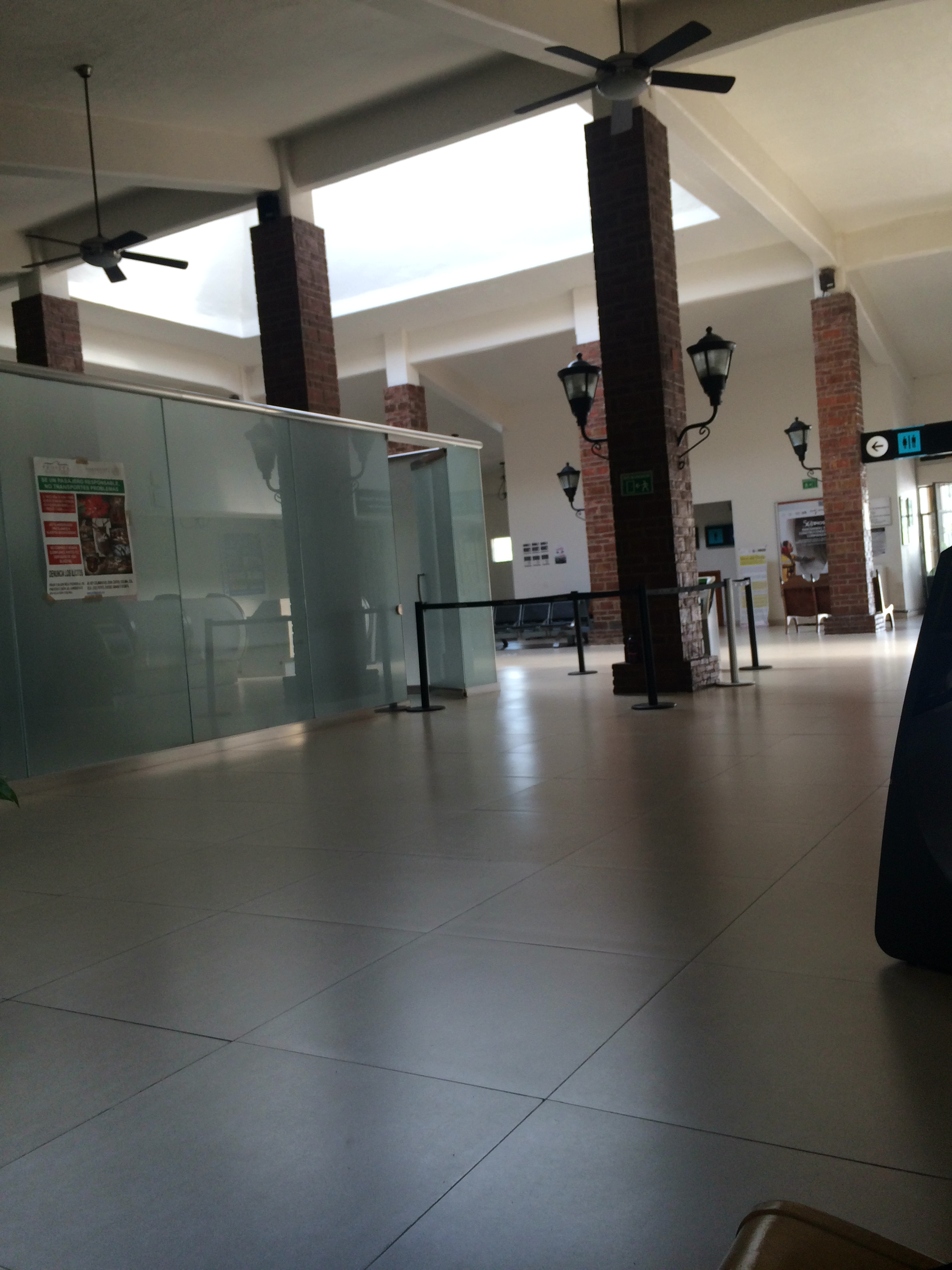
Passenger terminal main hall

== Airlines and destinations ==
=== Passenger ===
Airlines	Destinations
Aeroméxico Connect	Mexico City–Benito Juárez
Volaris	Tijuana

Destinations map
Domestic destinations from Colima International Airport
Red = Year-round destination
Blue = Future destination
Green = Seasonal destination

== Statistics ==
=== Annual Traffic ===
Passenger statistics at CLQ
Year	Total Passengers	change %	Cargo movements (t)	Air operations
2006	101,634	Steady	75	5,207
2007	142,272	▲39.98%	230	7,432
2008	102,896	▼27.68%	92	7,311
2009	43,610	▼57.62%	93	5,233
2010	42,979	▼1.45%	242	4,418
2011	61,929	▲44.09%	89	5,365
2012	106,313	▲71.67%	100	6,810
2013	108,265	▲1.84%	80	6,169
2014	114,457	▲5.72%	105	6,338
2015	113,583	▼0.76%	118	6,115
2016	138,962	▲22.34%	117	5,999
2017	138,441	▼0.37%	107	6,132
2018	155,966	▲12.66%	96	5,999
2019	194,471	▲24.69%	128	6,311
2020	105,671	▼45.66%	36	3,594
2021	143,774	▲36.05%	47	3,549
2022	169,516	▲17.90%	48	3,726
2023	201,243	▲18.72%	0.45	3,422
2024	212,435	▲5.56%	3	3,937
2025	250,146	▲17.75%	3	4,070

=== Busiest routes ===
Busiest routes from CLQ (Jan–Dec 2025)
Rank	Airport	Passengers
1	Tijuana, Baja California	93,018
2	Mexico City–AIFA, State of Mexico	25,300

== See also ==
- List of the busiest airports in Mexico
- List of airports in Mexico
- List of airports by ICAO code: M
- List of busiest airports in North America
- List of the busiest airports in Latin America
- Transportation in Mexico
- Tourism in Mexico
- Aeropuertos y Servicios Auxiliares
