= Loreto International Airport =

International airport in Loreto, Baja California Sur, Mexico

Loreto International Airport Aeropuerto Internacional de Loreto
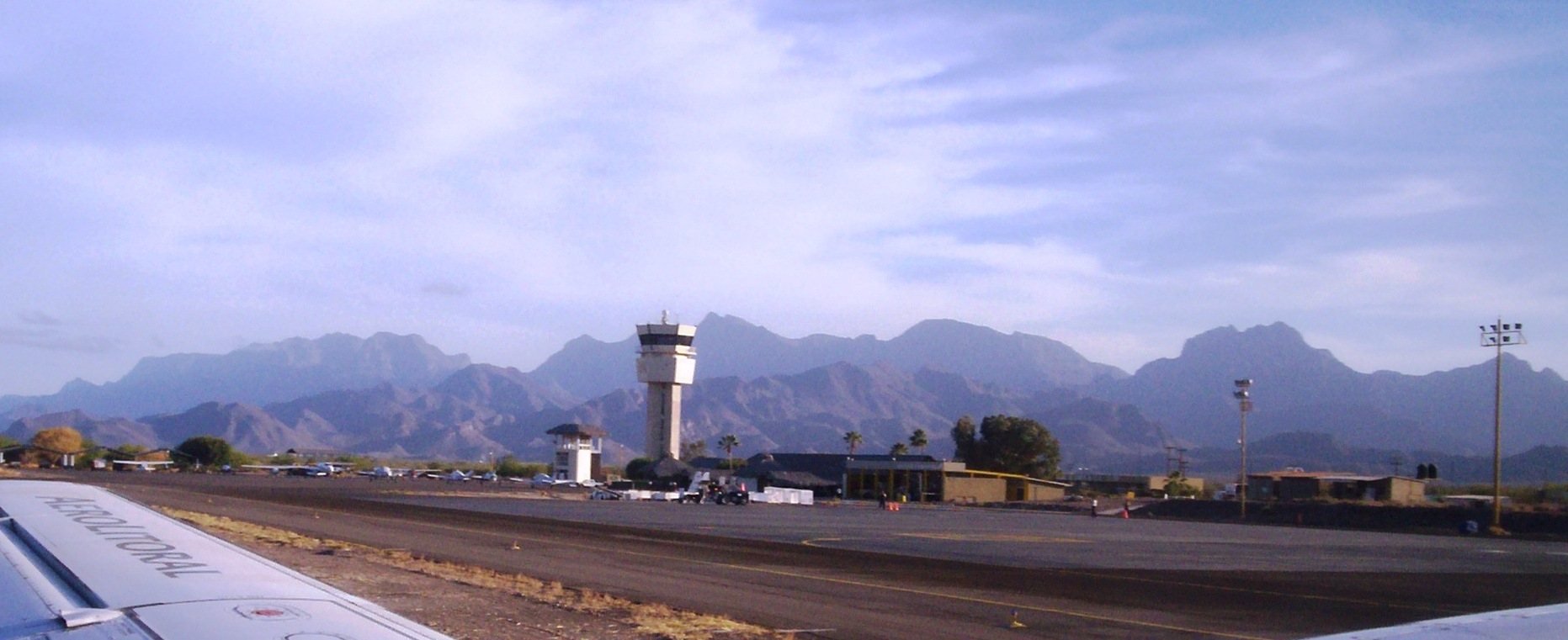
- IATA: LTO; ICAO: MMLT

Summary
- Airport type: Public
- Operator: Grupo Aeroportuario Marina
- Serves: Loreto, Baja California Sur, Mexico
- Time zone: MST (UTC-07:00)
- Elevation AMSL: 10 m (33 ft)
- Coordinates: 25°59′21″N 111°20′54″W
- Website: www.aeropuertosasa.mx/LTO

Map
- Location of the airport in Baja California Sur LTO (Mexico)

Runways
Direction	Length		Surface
Direction	m	ft	Surface
16/34	2,200	7,218	Asphalt

Statistics (2025)
- Total passengers: 183,381
- Ranking in Mexico: 47th
- Source: Agencial Federal de Aviación Civil

Loreto International Airport (Spanish: Aeropuerto Internacional de Loreto) (IATA: LTO, ICAO: MMLT) is an international airport located in Loreto, Baja California Sur, Mexico. Serving as the principal gateway for both domestic and international air travel to Loreto, a popular tourist destination situated on the Baja California Peninsula, the airport facilitates nonstop flights to western Mexico, the United States, and Canada. In addition, it supports various activities in general and executive aviation, as well as flight training. Operated by Grupo Aeroportuario Marina, Loreto Airport reported handling 173,927 passengers in 2024, increasing to 183,381 in 2025.

== Facilities ==
Loreto Airport is situated at an elevation of 10 metres (33 ft) above mean sea level, with its grounds adjacent to the coast. The airport's infrastructure consists of one passenger terminal and a single runway designated as 16/34, measuring 2,200 metres (7,200 ft) in length. The apron is equipped with 3 aircraft stands designated for the disembarkation of narrow-body aircraft, with capabilities to handle aircraft the size of Boeing 737s and Airbus A320s. However, the airport primarily receives Embraer ERJ 145s, Bombardier CRJs, and Boeing 737s. Flights operate daily from 7:00 AM to 7:00 PM.

The passenger terminal at Loreto Airport features a compact design with six gates and various passenger amenities, including snack bars, a wine/liquor shop, and a tourist spot offering handicrafts. The airport also caters to charter flights, as well as executive and general aviation operations.

Aeromexico previously served several domestic and international destinations, but the service was discontinued in 2014. In late 2023, Mexicana de Aviación announced its intention to add a route between Loreto International Airport and its Felipe Ángeles International Airport hub in Mexico City. Currently, the airport offers regular international flights to Los Angeles and seasonal services to Calgary, Dallas/Fort Worth, Phoenix and San Francisco.

== Airlines and destinations ==
=== Passenger ===
Airlines	Destinations
Aéreo Servicio Guerrero	Guaymas, Los Mochis
Alaska Airlines	Los Angeles; Seasonal: San Diego (begins December 19, 2026)
American Eagle	Seasonal: Dallas/Fort Worth, Phoenix–Sky Harbor
Volaris	Tijuana
WestJet	Seasonal: Calgary

=== Destination maps ===
Domestic destinations from Loreto International Airport
Red = Year-round destination
Blue = Future destination
Green = Seasonal destination
International destinations from Loreto International Airport
Red = Year-round destination
Blue = Future destination
Green = Seasonal destination

== Statistics ==
=== Annual Traffic ===
Passenger statistics at LTO
Year	Total Passengers	change %	Air operations
2006	70,853	Steady	7,629
2007	77,898	▲9.94%	8,175
2008	66,179	▼15.04%	7,301
2009	41,062	▼37.95%	4,566
2010	37,330	▼9.09%	4,786
2011	43,756	▲17.21%	4,323
2012	40,125	▼8.30%	4,335
2013	53,474	▲33.27%	4,542
2014	55,576	▲3.93%	4,403
2015	57,907	▲4.19%	3,784
2016	72,412	▲25.05%	3,913
2017	85,063	▲17.47%	4,394
2018	89,079	▲6.70%	4,341
2019	116,827	▲31.15%	4,447
2020	66,105	▼43.42%	3,769
2021	101,692	▲53.83%	4,706
2022	131,933	▲29.74%	5,060
2023	169,228	▲28.27%	4,912
2024	173,927	▲2.78%	4,824
2025	183,381	▲5.44%	5,367

=== Busiest routes ===
Busiest routes at LTO (Jan–Dec 2025)
Rank	Airport	Passengers
1	Tijuana, Baja California	35,832
2	Los Angeles, United States	28,317
3	Phoenix–Sky Harbor, United States	15,822
4	Calgary, Canada	3,340
5	Dallas/Fort Worth, United States	2,373
6	San Francisco, United States	1,637

== Accidents and incidents ==
- Aeroméxico Flight 498, also known as the 1986 Cerritos mid-air collision: On August 31, 1986, an Aeroméxico DC-9 that originated from Mexico City and stopped at Loreto and other Mexican destinations collided with a private aircraft while descending into Los Angeles International Airport, killing all 67 passengers on both aircraft and an additional 15 people on the ground.

== See also ==
- List of the busiest airports in Mexico
- List of airports in Mexico
- Airports in Baja California Sur
- List of airports by ICAO code: M
- Transportation in Mexico
- Tourism in Mexico
- List of beaches in Mexico
- Gulf of California
