= List of the busiest airports in Mexico =

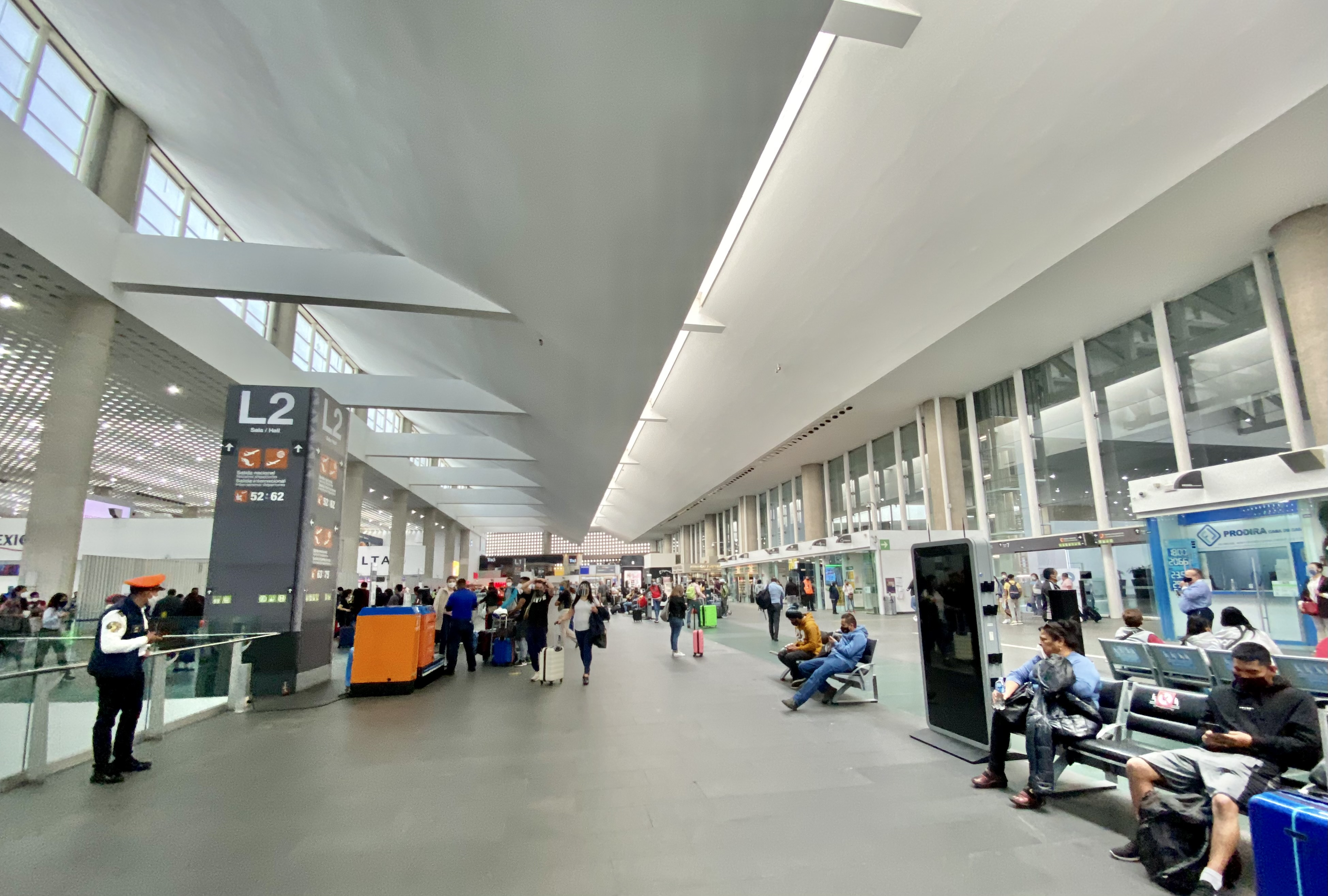
Interior view of Terminal 2 at Mexico City International Airport, the busiest airport in Mexico.

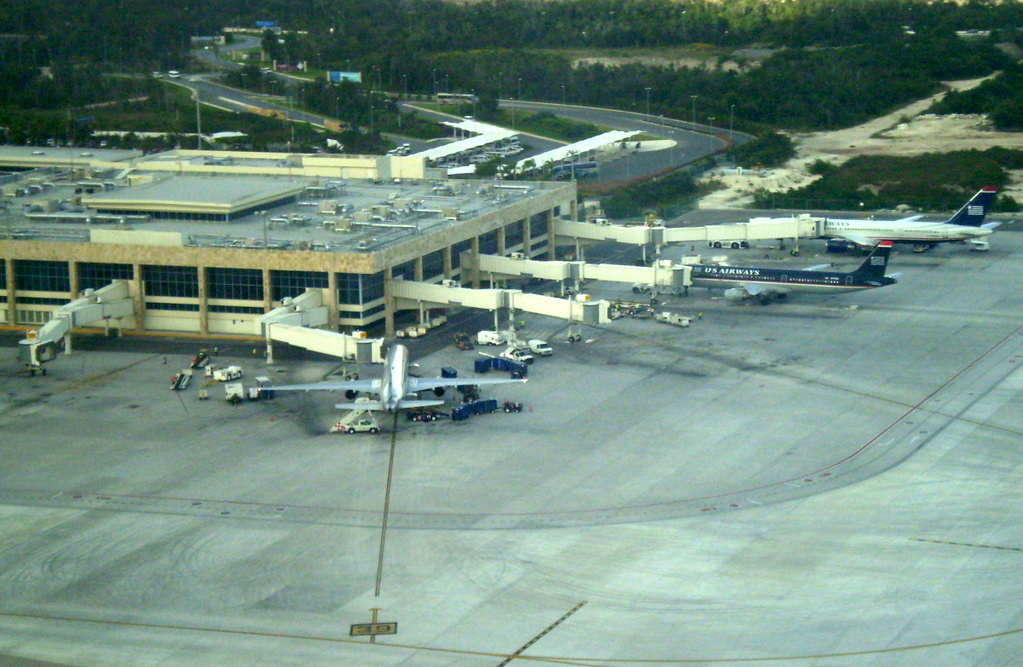
Aerial view of Terminal 3 at Cancún International Airport, the busiest airport in Mexico and Latin America by international passenger traffic

This page lists the busiest airports in Mexico, ranked by passenger traffic, international passenger traffic, aircraft operations, and cargo traffic, according to the Federal Civil Aviation Agency (AFAC). The data covers 2010 onward and includes ICAO and IATA codes, along with growth rates. A separate list includes all airports in Mexico.

Mexico has an extensive and well-developed aviation network, with 1,527 registered airfields and 80 airports, ranking fourth globally in total airfields. The country's airports handle over 180 million passengers annually.

Mexico City International Airport (MEX) remains the country's busiest airport and one of the largest in Latin America. It serves as the primary hub for Mexico's flagship carrier, Aeroméxico. The broader Mexico City Airport System, which includes Felipe Ángeles International Airport (NLU) and Toluca International Airport (TLC), is one of the busiest city airport systems in Latin America.

Cancún International Airport (CUN) is the busiest airport in Mexico and Latin America by international passenger traffic, offering flights to numerous destinations across the Americas and Europe. Felipe Ángeles International Airport (NLU) leads in cargo operations, with the most operational runways (3) and the longest runway in Mexico.

Other major airports include Guadalajara (GDL), Monterrey (MTY), Tijuana (TIJ), Los Cabos (SJD), and Puerto Vallarta (PVR). Every Mexican metropolitan area with over 300,000 inhabitants has an airport, with Cuernavaca (CVJ) and Xalapa (JAL) being the largest cities whose airports lack scheduled passenger service.

== Map ==
Airports in Mexico with current and recent scheduled passenger service (2025)
Purple = Major airports (over 5 million passengers)
Red = International and domestic service
Green = Domestic service only

== Mexico's 50 busiest airports by passenger traffic (2020-2025) ==
#	Airport	IATA	ICAO	2020	2021	2022	2023	2024	2025	% (24/25)
1	Mexico City International Airport	MEX	MMMX	21,977,268	36,028,389	46,200,529	48,377,435	45,359,485	44,605,800	▼1.66%
2	Cancún International Airport	CUN	MMUN	12,259,148	22,318,467	30,342,961	32,750,411	30,563,739	29,478,653	▼3.55%
3	Guadalajara International Airport	GDL	MMGL	8,094,115	12,208,828	15,574,002	17,678,839	17,877,142	18,773,673	▲5.11%
4	Monterrey International Airport	MTY	MMMY	4,994,170	8,269,834	10,943,186	13,326,936	13,650,872	15,777,052	▲15.58%
5	Tijuana International Airport	TIJ	MMTJ	6,310,798	9,665,844	12,308,370	13,180,604	12,577,865	12,765,761	▲1.49%
6	Los Cabos International Airport	SJD	MMSD	2,927,987	5,465,624	6,843,094	7,459,841	7,508,982	7,553,028	▲0.59%
7	Felipe Ángeles International Airport	NLU	MMSM			912,415	2,630,437	6,348,091	7,079,040	▲11.52%
8	Puerto Vallarta International Airport	PVR	MMPR	2,489,825	4,053,893	6,122,904	6,726,336	6,811,013	6,957,392	▲2.15%
9	Mérida International Airport	MID	MMMD	1,297,308	2,079,503	3,079,618	3,674,103	3,716,588	3,951,827	▲6.33%
10	Bajío International Airport	BJX	MMLO	1,377,573	2,101,433	2,581,976	3,195,946	3,179,905	3,317,172	▲4.32%
11	Querétaro Intercontinental Airport	QRO	MMQT	506,140	817,791	1,151,602	1,767,376	2,074,950	2,409,429	▲16.12%
12	Culiacán International Airport	CUL	MMCL	1,373,102	1,970,211	2,426,003	2,612,249	2,275,370	2,227,343	▼2.11%
13	Hermosillo International Airport	HMO	MMHO	961,485	1,515,700	1,908,813	2,155,149	2,174,841	2,223,260	▲2.23%
14	Ciudad Juárez International Airport	CJS	MMCS	790,009	1,499,841	2,004,524	2,275,153	2,142,511	2,130,551	▼0.56%
15	Chihuahua International Airport	CUU	MMCU	818,151	1,363,937	1,727,006	1,905,714	1,850,383	1,956,431	▲5.73%
16	Toluca International Airport	TLC	MMTO	215,701	134,305	585,036	1,520,255	1,704,011	1,927,498	▲13.12%
17	Veracruz International Airport	VER	MMVR	721,159	1,103,460	1,333,578	1,665,694	1,726,200	1,884,796	▲9.19%
18	Oaxaca International Airport	OAX	MMOX	590,778	913,937	1,304,034	1,693,042	1,793,259	1,870,913	▲4.33%
19	Mazatlán International Airport	MZT	MMMZ	740,306	1,106,071	1,450,944	1,621,740	1,877,553	1,749,103	▼6.84%
20	Tuxtla Gutiérrez International Airport	TGZ	MMTG	756,786	1,186,528	1,590,178	1,784,010	1,681,980	1,708,535	▲1.58%
21	Morelia International Airport	MLM	MMMM	623,016	947,100	1,167,879	1,378,199	1,314,330	1,518,006	▲15.50%
22	Villahermosa International Airport	VSA	MMVA	638,477	976,456	1,214,190	1,396,653	1,488,164	1,453,605	▼2.32%
23	La Paz International Airport	LAP	MMLP	563,691	902,708	1,062,529	1,095,343	1,209,210	1,347,389	▲11.43%
24	Mexicali International Airport	MXL	MMML	688,023	1,086,926	1,289,102	1,593,760	1,037,038	1,277,953	▲23.23%
25	Puebla International Airport	PBC	MMPB	383,496	565,612	790,931	935,500	1,076,484	1,255,041	▲16.59%
26	Tulum International Airport	TQO	MMTL				39,768	1,237,248	1,248,645	▲0.92%
27	Aguascalientes International Airport	AGU	MMAS	469,039	785,335	918,095	914,879	963,040	985,253	▲2.31%
28	Puerto Escondido International Airport	PXM	MMPS	267,817	526,231	729,002	917,400	850,142	948,590	▲11.58%
29	Torreón International Airport	TRC	MMTC	320,820	537,161	670,245	776,462	816,429	846,540	▲3.69%
30	San Luis Potosí International Airport	SLP	MMSP	309,311	528,625	633,364	718,639	738,476	836,895	▲13.33%
31	Bahías de Huatulco International Airport	HUX	MMBT	402,728	692,150	971,035	914,714	850,877	804,891	▼5.40%
32	Ixtapa-Zihuatanejo International Airport	ZIH	MMZH	317,395	434,176	593,354	654,392	674,497	733,132	▲8.69%
33	Los Mochis International Airport	LMM	MMLM	204,291	362,389	419,652	464,226	587,165	716,648	▲22.05%
34	Acapulco International Airport	ACA	MMAA	395,948	670,239	838,991	894,012	604,464	692,210	▲14.52%
35	Cozumel International Airport	CZM	MMCZ	268,290	531,675	663,270	677,503	722,370	655,038	▼9.32%
36	Tampico International Airport	TAM	MMTM	270,835	397,191	495,602	563,204	561,065	611,494	▲8.99%
37	Durango International Airport	DGO	MMDO	271,231	446,030	485,524	513,246	533,501	569,178	▲6.69%
38	Ciudad Obregón International Airport	CEN	MMCN	215,147	354,868	432,080	426,648	438,717	531,343	▲21.11%
39	Tapachula International Airport	TAP	MMTP	280,475	424,249	503,254	553,744	620,026	526,287	▼15.12%
40	Reynosa International Airport	REX	MMRX	229,058	425,918	518,051	540,122	531,558	442,464	▼16.76%
41	Zacatecas International Airport	ZCL	MMZC	232,352	375,930	433,952	443,582	375,020	427,259	▲13.93%
42	Chetumal International Airport	CTM	MMCM	152,670	279,424	374,152	335,088	433,527	423,144	▼2.40%
43	Ciudad del Carmen International Airport	CME	MMCE	259,729	322,399	339,294	342,737	318,782	292,917	▼8.11%
44	Colima Airport	CLQ	MMIA	105,667	143,774	169,516	201,243	212,435	250,146	▲17.75%
45	Tepic International Airport	TPQ	MMEP	132,580	171,989	205,595	244,531	211,447	239,420	▲13.23%
46	Playa de Oro International Airport	ZLO	MMZO	79,798	126,175	158,133	172,212	216,515	228,999	▲5.77%
47	Loreto International Airport	LTO	MMLT	66,043	101,688	131,714	169,228	173,927	183,381	▲5.44%
48	Uruapan International Airport	UPN	MMPN	129,019	167,112	151,151	173,005	172,193	175,010	▲1.64%
49	Nuevo Laredo International Airport	NLD	MMNL	28,891	53,906	107,368	197,673	151,764	167,165	▲10.15%
50	Minatitlán International Airport	MTT	MMMT	70,295	98,544	112,018	142,118	153,659	159,315	▲3.68%

== Mexico's 50 busiest airports by passenger traffic (2010-2019) ==
#	Airport	IATA	ICAO	2010	2011	2012	2013	2014	2015	2016	2017	2018	2019	% (18/19)
1	Mexico City International Airport	MEX	MMMX	24,130,535	26,368,861	29,491,553	31,532,331	34,252,381	38,430,494	41,710,254	44,732,418	47,700,547	50,304,011	▲5.45%
2	Cancún International Airport	CUN	MMUN	12,439,266	13,022,481	14,463,435	15,962,162	17,455,353	19,596,485	21,415,795	23,601,509	25,202,016	25,481,989	▲1.11%
3	Guadalajara International Airport	GDL	MMGL	6,953,900	7,201,700	7,436,400	8,148,762	8,695,183	9,758,516	11,362,552	12,779,874	14,340,152	14,823,592	▲3.37%
4	Monterrey International Airport	MTY	MMMY	5,380,412	5,582,794	6,105,910	6,417,755	7,128,531	8,461,917	9,178,533	9,683,140	10,733,186	11,176,555	▲4.13%
5	Tijuana International Airport	TIJ	MMTJ	3,649,500	3,500,800	3,759,700	4,269,235	4,372,865	4,853,797	6,318,826	7,089,219	7,823,744	8,917,160	▲13.97%
6	Los Cabos International Airport	SJD	MMSD	2,745,500	2,807,000	3,018,500	3,234,287	3,130,986	3,523,010	4,089,000	4,701,580	5,065,152	5,339,316	▲5.41%
7	Puerto Vallarta International Airport	PVR	MMPR	2,735,300	2,535,900	2,597,700	2,671,035	3,039,126	3,517,801	3,990,483	4,433,173	4,627,800	4,931,026	▲6.55%
8	Mérida International Airport	MID	MMMD	1,135,657	1,225,593	1,233,738	1,316,242	1,436,959	1,663,616	1,944,782	2,148,484	2,451,616	2,790,649	▲13.82%
9	Bajío International Airport	BJX	MMLO	853,800	854,200	950,300	975,873	1,203,680	1,472,811	1,692,864	1,940,411	2,323,772	2,746,824	▲18.20%
10	Culiacán International Airport	CUL	MMCL	1,059,904	1,070,706	1,168,380	1,252,235	1,307,717	1,432,315	1,726,654	1,857,340	2,270,834	2,458,863	▲8.28%
11	Hermosillo International Airport	HMO	MMHO	1,138,300	1,200,900	1,288,700	1,276,201	1,277,897	1,309,763	1,525,884	1,593,214	1,708,963	1,840,477	▲7.69%
12	Chihuahua International Airport	CUU	MMCU	828,123	782,133	855,129	885,659	961,538	1,110,513	1,305,961	1,385,471	1,556,770	1,699,816	▲9.18%
13	Ciudad Juárez International Airport	CJS	MMCS	633,919	673,364	699,394	702,904	769,029	863,760	1,102,855	1,216,709	1,364,028	1,597,471	▲17.11%
14	Tuxtla Gutiérrez International Airport	TGZ	MMTG	650,053	803,611	786,829	855,073	928,243	1,121,332	1,272,689	1,342,345	1,388,706	1,496,152	▲7.73%
15	Veracruz International Airport	VER	MMVR	834,199	867,438	894,552	1,010,814	1,157,522	1,249,914	1,315,867	1,367,972	1,488,569	1,475,581	▼0.87%
16	Villahermosa International Airport	VSA	MMVA	728,781	851,264	960,094	1,014,445	1,121,365	1,273,140	1,240,795	1,260,277	1,227,648	1,245,026	▲1.41%
17	Oaxaca International Airport	OAX	MMOX	446,676	401,320	473,133	510,345	542,271	663,187	746,910	862,286	951,037	1,196,245	▲25.78%
18	Mexicali International Airport	MXL	MMML	461,400	493,000	521,900	496,000	498,928	586,396	708,551	794,152	1,130,541	1,191,920	▲5.42%
19	Querétaro Intercontinental Airport	QRO	MMQT	115,622	152,568	226,908	292,152	415,391	503,276	637,752	807,228	1,024,023	1,175,000	▲14.74%
20	Mazatlán International Airport	MZT	MMMZ	756,122	722,492	669,407	731,297	789,234	853,409	973,440	983,327	1,038,555	1,161,155	▲11.80%
21	La Paz International Airport	LAP	MMLP	558,800	546,500	553,100	531,140	583,529	623,475	837,072	837,162	916,599	998,024	▲8.88%
22	Bahías de Huatulco International Airport	HUX	MMBT	385,593	459,640	473,262	484,604	519,619	618,767	662,780	776,632	819,305	892,287	▲8.90%
23	Morelia International Airport	MLM	MMMM	429,700	376,200	409,300	425,200	456,368	467,297	524,944	609,138	721,802	890,358	▲23.35%
24	Acapulco International Airport	ACA	MMAA	736,878	596,326	546,951	617,079	631,570	730,382	718,493	673,809	739,120	875,315	▲18.42%
25	Aguascalientes International Airport	AGU	MMAS	294,100	328,500	400,100	456,600	527,033	621,008	681,436	740,558	855,669	847,975	▼0.89%
26	Puebla International Airport	PBC	MMPB	318,037	218,401	264,211	292,152	285,041	327,811	383,361	511,233	685,583	761,575	▲11.08%
27	Tampico International Airport	TAM	MMTM	451,005	548,083	594,797	608,813	688,893	763,744	717,599	711,016	736,627	739,143	▲0.34%
28	Torreón International Airport	TRC	MMTC	338,003	375,669	415,244	467,398	523,783	556,449	646,898	610,493	681,551	708,563	▲3.96%
29	Toluca International Airport	TLC	MMTO	2,270,767	1,579,115	972,414	1,161,064	867,096	865,037	771,152	789,081	691,712	689,001	▼0.39%
30	San Luis Potosí International Airport	SLP	MMSP	222,854	248,645	271,107	261,699	373,986	444,469	504,313	546,488	626,512	643,224	▲2.66%
31	Ixtapa-Zihuatanejo International Airport	ZIH	MMZH	496,523	480,613	457,906	459,799	508,065	562,099	557,389	591,415	566,497	625,186	▲10.35%
32	Cozumel International Airport	CZM	MMCZ	438,832	441,692	457,269	449,871	514,528	553,776	538,092	541,598	579,719	546,423	▼5.74%
33	Durango International Airport	DGO	MMDO	217,230	227,131	241,946	235,952	255,937	315,835	424,415	393,599	418,914	527,004	▲25.80%
34	Reynosa International Airport	REX	MMRX	198,138	216,599	302,934	392,206	472,027	507,186	563,952	482,661	466,934	480,524	▲2.91%
35	Zacatecas International Airport	ZCL	MMZC	268,577	248,029	265,264	259,677	284,625	320,065	343,136	348,714	366,871	475,241	▲29.53%
36	Puerto Escondido International Airport	PXM	MMPS	66,205	47,249	78,092	121,703	161,299	185,330	225,917	255,831	302,478	407,651	▲34.77%
37	Ciudad del Carmen International Airport	CME	MMCE	505,256	516,205	566,333	602,305	661,901	623,154	459,497	362,795	362,663	401,316	▲10.65%
38	Tapachula International Airport	TAP	MMTP	185,159	161,892	157,926	156,288	175,194	265,670	308,788	292,592	330,619	385,483	▲16.59%
39	Ciudad Obregón International Airport	CEN	MMCN	217,761	211,472	181,806	191,242	214,992	245,492	256,573	303,405	338,316	373,337	▲10.35%
40	Chetumal International Airport	CTM	MMCM	95,687	129,615	156,838	151,087	155,799	179,377	209,972	275,610	321,785	368,332	▲14.46%
41	Los Mochis International Airport	LMM	MMLM	243,300	205,800	183,500	161,057	189,273	235,323	285,011	280,166	273,068	319,236	▲16.90%
42	Tepic International Airport	TPQ	MMEP	37,503	41,899	50,742	88,417	111,253	113,043	148,367	142,051	163,183	210,545	▲29.02%
43	Colima Airport	CLQ	MMIA	43,006	61,929	103,739	108,275	114,457	113,583	138,962	138,441	155,966	194,471	▲24.68%
44	Playa de Oro International Airport	ZLO	MMZO	159,700	157,200	168,000	193,300	196,084	169,485	174,394	176,263	166,053	169,064	▲1.81%
45	Uruapan International Airport	UPN	MMPN	107,379	109,455	112,275	113,101	106,949	110,067	128,578	150,192	160,045	167,796	▲4.84%
46	Campeche International Airport	CPE	MMCP	103,514	113,169	148,447	166,271	190,535	181,751	183,369	178,675	165,185	164,919	▼0.16%
47	Minatitlán International Airport	MTT	MMMT	120,975	108,521	133,235	174,855	234,749	256,431	233,242	201,219	196,786	148,159	▼24.71%
48	Loreto International Airport	LTO	MMLT	37,330	43,756	40,125	53,474	55,576	57,907	72,412	85,063	89,079	116,827	▲31.14%
49	Nuevo Laredo International Airport	NLD	MMNL	97,344	82,584	84,443	70,191	66,846	72,978	84,064	78,338	63,576	65,471	▲2.98%
50	Matamoros International Airport	MAM	MMMA	55,803	81,912	101,716	96,985	89,609	97,654	97,973	88,147	63,817	61,261	▼4.00%

== Mexico's 10 busiest airports by international passenger traffic (2010-2025) ==
Rank	Airport	2010	2011	2012	2013	2014	2015	2016	2017	2018	2019	2020	2021	2022	2023	2024	2025
1	Cancún International Airport	9,067,009	9,338,385	9,848,665	10,890,500	11,971,884	13,569,063	14,571,637	15,793,141	16,424,506	16,501,593	6,804,153	13,237,113	19,637,065	20,908,194	20,294,735	19,564,409
2	Mexico City International Airport	8,532,638	8,904,004	9,803,301	10,632,324	11,499,031	12,755,938	14,053,352	15,750,053	17,201,961	17,643,753	5,790,457	10,144,928	14,506,234	16,294,664	17,116,325	17,482,146
3	Guadalajara International Airport	2,176,939	2,480,530	2,440,846	2,600,886	2,878,691	3,250,069	3,669,204	3,758,248	4,036,592	4,347,331	2,345,667	3,692,744	4,444,914	5,201,275	5,910,406	5,970,468
4	Los Cabos International Airport	1,968,499	1,970,944	1,987,172	2,336,779	2,269,989	2,510,045	2,824,766	3,240,027	3,400,127	3,436,196	1,723,041	3,460,392	4,280,347	4,510,004	4,658,059	4,688,307
5	Puerto Vallarta International Airport	1,995,820	1,799,452	1,714,271	1,766,477	2,142,738	2,431,312	2,722,896	3,043,563	3,061,865	3,127,870	1,572,707	2,244,590	3,507,564	3,902,963	3,962,318	3,824,488
6	Monterrey International Airport	803,071	830,911	942,757	958,837	1,035,516	1,317,061	1,260,905	1,262,775	1,331,794	1,419,989	505,998	1,294,525	1,397,955	1,849,658	2,276,529	2,639,348
7	Bajío International Airport	341,739	377,288	395,597	376,607	478,366	552,322	595,965	645,174	681,703	697,306	334,262	627,774	770,796	871,355	1,052,493	1,059,928
8	Morelia International Airport	186,512	144,273	189,732	190,920	228,272	248,855	267,518	295,724	359,900	418,557	241,077	403,441	499,176	587,798	658,793	730,719
9	Querétaro Intercontinental Airport	45,064	82,741	127,633	155,469	175,568	194,821	196,827	235,384	304,212	349,382	129,512	249,365	345,974	419,428	686,912	719,990
10	Tulum International Airport	-	-	-	-	-	-	-	-	-	-	-	-	-	-	631,626	660,179

== Mexico's 10 busiest airports by aircraft operations (2010-2025) ==
Rank	Airport	2010	2011	2012	2013	2014	2015	2016	2017	2018	2019	2020	2021	2022	2023	2024	2025
1	Mexico City International Airport	339,898	350,032	377,743	389,226	406,340	426,761	448,142	448,020	459,235	459,987	239,306	327,812	385,313	363,271	323,025	302,539
2	Cancún International Airport	119,010	120,338	127,335	135,800	146,238	161,929	171,979	181,105	190,187	183,838	106,678	176,549	214,340	223,284	205,555	198,342
3	Guadalajara International Airport	133,323	129,977	126,991	132,333	140,021	145,102	158,950	167,231	180,317	179,652	123,633	149,436	175,669	173,229	154,862	155,614
4	Monterrey International Airport	90,216	86,071	88,604	90,234	102,462	114,428	115,593	110,938	114,564	112,188	58,265	77,860	90,950	107,525	112,584	132,899
5	Tijuana International Airport	46,283	42,393	42,959	48,335	48,234	52,912	61,762	63,292	66,661	69,624	60,242	78,397	93,035	95,743	85,564	86,750
6	Toluca International Airport	74,114	79,332	87,630	91,945	95,423	95,063	101,695	101,186	96,725	84,723	60,917	70,387	74,710	78,816	79,576	81,748
7	Los Cabos International Airport	36,177	33,399	30,564	31,034	29,412	33,322	36,554	42,184	42,815	42,371	29,290	49,147	52,706	56,217	67,404	69,458
8	Felipe Ángeles International Airport	-	-	-	-	-	-	-	-	-	-	-	-	8,996	23,202	67,730	67,617
9	Puerto Vallarta International Airport	42,705	39,306	37,198	37,513	41,911	44,786	47,606	51,035	53,204	53,046	37,509	54,064	64,373	62,303	67,113	67,213
10	Mérida International Airport	30,837	28,545	27,623	27,842	31,731	33,484	37,050	43,362	50,091	52,341	33,662	39,273	51,589	57,212	55,703	58,517

== Mexico's 10 busiest airports by cargo traffic (2010-2025) ==
Rank	Airport	2010	2011	2012	2013	2014	2015	2016	2017	2018	2019	2020	2021	2022	2023	2024	2025
1	Felipe Ángeles International Airport	-	-	-	-	-	-	-	-	-	-	-	-	5.18	185,733	447,341	406,193
2	Mexico City International Airport	393,076	411,456	397,018	376,350	396,732	446,915	483,434	535,622	581,675	556,142	469,725	567,779	570,808	447,887	240,035	252,556
3	Guadalajara International Airport	130,685	125,201	127,733	130,297	142,580	136,418	151,268	159,220	164,242	161,108	161,593	197,219	176,779	165,006	173,711	183,410
4	Monterrey International Airport	48,637	46,666	46,649	46,068	43,545	48,502	47,898	52,867	56,282	51,983	49,038	67,627	77,764	74,970	79,425	76,282
5	Querétaro Intercontinental Airport	8,384	14,858	16,527	17,924	19,779	22,355	24,739	35,767	53,289	50,813	45,144	64,888	72,847	79,824	77,391	76,025
6	Tijuana International Airport	14,382	15,256	15,820	16,920	16,880	18,278	21,316	22,679	27,171	30,707	28,332	35,449	37,427	35,265	38,570	37,894
7	Cancún International Airport	26,543	25,671	27,332	27,072	22,638	25,000	25,152	29,714	32,858	31,476	17,715	30,867	45,868	38,822	36,166	36,207
8	Toluca International Airport	25,714	30,393	26,758	26,516	26,696	25,437	21,827	31,159	36,491	35,779	44,833	54,943	43,205	37,694	39,109	30,398
9	San Luis Potosí International Airport	26,754	27,339	28,111	24,672	28,531	27,114	25,801	26,550	24,760	24,169	22,004	26,717	28,790	28,737	27,500	26,620
10	Mérida International Airport	18,467	17,732	17,713	17,867	17,954	18,991	19,127	20,264	20,648	22,444	20,074	22,458	22,646	26,027	26,201	25,439

== See also ==
- List of airports in Mexico
- Busiest airports in North America
- Busiest airports in Latin America
- Airfields in Baja California
- Airfields in Baja California Sur
- Small airstrips
- Military bases
- Air Force bases
- Naval air bases
- Lists of airports
- International airports
- Defunct airports
- Airports by ICAO code
- Airlines of Mexico
- Airline hubs
- Airline destinations
- Transportation in Mexico
- Tourism in Mexico
- Federal Civil Aviation Agency
- Grupo Aeroportuario del Sureste
- Grupo Aeroportuario del Pacífico
- Grupo Aeroportuario del Centro Norte
- Aeropuertos y Servicios Auxiliares
- Busiest airports by passenger traffic
- Metropolitan areas of Mexico
