= Federal Civil Aviation Agency =

Civil aviation regulatory body of Mexico

The Federal Civil Aviation Agency (Spanish: Agencia Federal de Aviación Civil, AFAC) is a division of the Secretariat of Communications and Transportation of Mexico. It replaced the former Directorate General of Civil Aeronautics (Dirección General de Aeronáutica Civil or DGAC) on October 16, 2019. It is an agency of the Subsecretaría de Transporte of the Secretariat of Infrastructure, Communications and Transportation of Mexico. Its main responsibilities is to act as civil aviation authority (CAA) and to investigate aviation accidents and incidents in Mexico.

== History ==
The agency was originally established as the Dirección General de Aeronáutica Civil. Since December 2018, the DGAC's Director General is Lic. Rodrigo Vásquez-Colmenares Guzmán. He is the former CEO of TAR Aerolíneas.

On October 16, 2019, a decree in the Diario Oficial de la Federación created a new autonomous agency within the SCT, the Agencia Federal de Aviación Civil, to replace the DGAC. The new agency absorbs the old DGAC's assets, responsibilities and employees. The upgraded agency was designed in the wake of recommendations from the American International Aviation Safety Assessment Program, which suggested the creation of a new body with operational, technical and administrative autonomy.

== Accident investigations ==
- Western Airlines Flight 2605
- 2008 Mexico City plane crash
- 2012 Mexico Learjet 25 crash
- AeroUnion Flight 302
