= Aeroméxico Connect =

Regional airline of Mexico

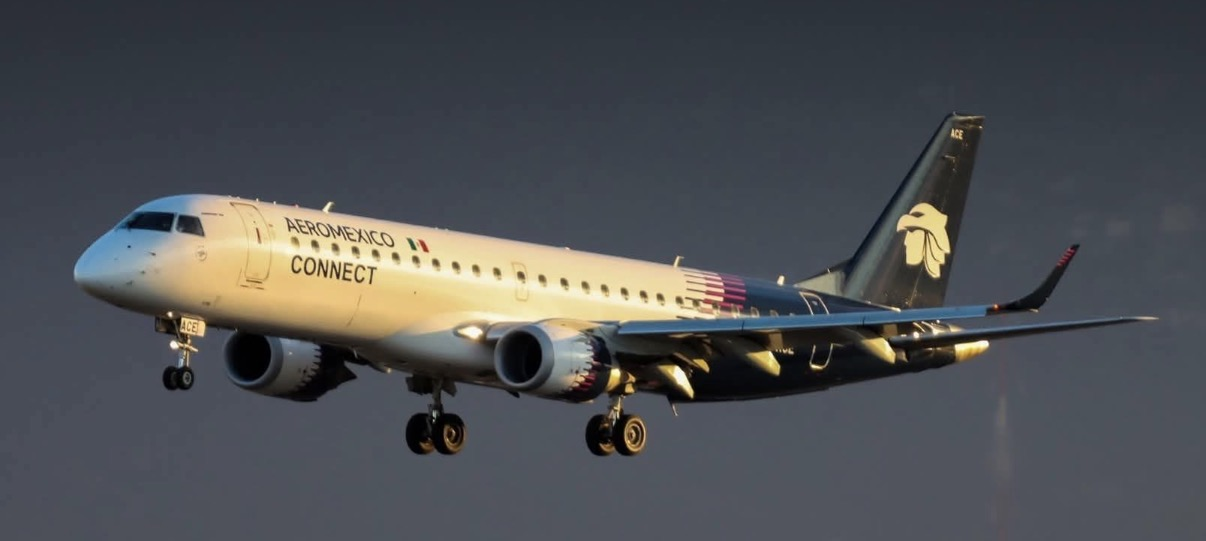
- Aeroméxico Connect Embraer 190
IATA	ICAO	Call sign
5D	SLI	COSTERA
- Founded: 1988; 38 years ago (as Aerolitoral)
- AOC #: LVQF318F
- Hubs: Mexico City; Monterrey
- Frequent-flyer program: Club Premier
- Alliance: SkyTeam (affiliate)
- Fleet size: 34
- Destinations: 60
- Parent company: Aeroméxico
- Headquarters: Mexico City, Mexico
- Website: www.aeromexico.com

Aerolitoral, S.A. de C.V., DBA Aeroméxico Connect, and formerly known as Aerolitoral, is the subsidiary airline of Aeroméxico operating Embraer 190 aircraft, with crew bases in Mexico City and Monterrey. It is headquartered in Monterrey. It operates feeder services to Aeroméxico's hub airports. It is considered the biggest and most important regional airline in Mexico, offering more than 300 scheduled flights daily to 42 destinations in Mexico, eleven in the United States, five in Central America, and two in the Caribbean. Its main bases are Guadalajara, Mexico City, and Monterrey. Aeroméxico Connect flights are marketed as Aeroméxico.

== History ==
=== 1988 to early 1990s ===
The airline was established in 1988 as Servicios Aéreos Litoral, to later become a subsidiary of Aeroméxico on December 1, 1990. It started with a fleet of 4 NAMC YS-11 aircraft in 1988 (XA-ROL, XA-ROV, XA-RPU, and XA-RRG) and was originally based in Veracruz. In February 1992, Aeroméxico started another regional feeder airline, Aerovías de Poniente, S.A. de C.V. based in Guadalajara using Fairchild Metroliners. The fleet was replaced and expanded quite fast between 1991 and 1995 and grew to a total of 29 Fairchild Metro III and Fairchild Metro 23 aircraft between the two feeders.

=== Mid 1990s ===
In 1991, the main base was moved to Monterrey and in 1992, Aeroponiente started operations from Guadalajara. The pilot seniority list was merged, and a common paint scheme was adopted using the Aeroméxico logo. Since 1992, Aerolitoral has been the only source of pilots for Aeroméxico with more than 400 pilots transferred until today. In 1993, a small base was opened in Culiacán and after 3 months was moved to Chihuahua. By 1995, the commuter airline had three bases with 29 airplanes.

The route network expanded all across the north of Mexico, and some routes to the United States were operated for a brief period, such as: Harlingen, McAllen, Corpus Christi, and Austin in Texas as well as to Albuquerque, New Mexico. The main U.S. routes operated in this period were San Antonio, Tucson, El Paso, and Phoenix.

In 1996, the two airlines were merged into Aerolitoral S.A de C.V., causing some labor problems to continue during 1997, and a pilot strike in the same year. There was a high demand for a bigger airplane in the route network and the Fairchild Metroliner 19 seater was not enough. After a long selection, Saab 340s were introduced in late 1997. In 1998 new services to the United States were added from Piedras Negras. and from Chihuahua to Dallas.

In early 1999, Aerolitoral was operating 29 Fairchild Metroliners and 6 Saab 340s. One Fairchild Metroliner had been converted to freighter and operations to Mexico City were resumed on behalf of Aeromexpress. In August 1999, a new CEO was appointed and Raúl Sáenz Campos replaced Carlos Treviño after a long time being at the airline. On December of the same year, the directive board decided to start a fleet renewal process, by replacing the first 3 Metroliners.

=== Early 2000s ===
In the period between the years 2000 and 2002, 13 more Saab 340Bs were added to replace Metros, with a peak fleet of 22 Saab 340Bs. On the third quarter of 2001, services to San Diego via Mexicali, to Zacatecas via Puerto Vallarta, and Monterrey were launched. Nevertheless, these services were discontinued shortly after 9/11 Attacks. On September 6, 2001, there was an accident without any fatalities, it was a Saab 340 with registration XA-ACK which crash-landed 15 miles southeast of Tijuana. The airplane suffered fuel starvation, due to a false indication in the flight deck fuel gauges, caused by a defective element on the system, reflecting more fuel than the aircraft actually had.

After the September 11, 2001 attacks, Aerolitoral experienced a drop in air traffic and downsized the fleet in order to survive. Services to San Diego, El Paso, and Laredo were canceled. San Antonio, Phoenix, and Tucson were reduced, moreover with the growth of Aviacsa on the domestic market with its Boeing 737-200 fleet invading the most profitable routes from Monterrey to León, Ciudad Juárez, Culiacán, and Guadalajara. The small commuter experienced severe financial troubles, and in 2002, many employees were laid off, among them 50 pilots. In 2002, services to Los Angeles and Ontario, California were introduced on behalf of Aeroméxico, while services to Phoenix and Laredo were cancelled.

In early 2003, with a fleet of 3 Fairchild Metroliners and 22 Saab 340s, the load factors were recovering as with many other airlines around the globe. That same year, Aerolitoral announced the acquisition of the first 5 Embraer ERJ 145, with deliveries starting in mid 2004. In December 2003, after operating a peak fleet for 13 years with 28 planes, the last Metroliners were retired. Early the next year, the first 3 ERJ 145's arrived from Brazil to Monterrey and started to replace the Saabs on the routes from Monterrey lasting over 1 hour, 50 minutes. The first flights were mainly to Chihuahua, Guadalajara, and Ciudad Juárez, and two of the same aircraft were added later that year. In this same year, a wet lease contract from was signed between Aerocaribe and AeroLitoral. The agreement stated that Aerolitoral would provide service in the routes on the South East of the country on behalf of Aerocaribe. The contract covered the wet lease of 3 Saab 340s operating the routes to Mérida, Tuxla Gutierrez, and the shuttle between Cancún and Cozumel. The agreement lasted a year and ended in late May 2005.

=== Mid 2000s ===
In 2005, the first scheduled services in and out of Mexico City on behalf of Aeroméxico were introduced to Ciudad Obregón and Los Mochis, using ERJ 145 aircraft. During this year, five more ERJ 145s were introduced to the fleet, introducing new routes to central Mexico and the southeast of the country, as well as increasing the size of the fleet to 10 aircraft.

In 2006, Aerolitoral took over services from Mexico City to Campeche and Durango, previously operated by Aeromar on behalf of Aeroméxico, and resumed operations to Reynosa, Oaxaca, and other Aeroméxico non-revenue city pairs. By the end of 2006, an ERJ crew base in Mexico City was established, 13 more ERJs were introduced to the fleet, most of them in addition, bringing the number of 23 by the end of the year.

In 2007, Aerolitoral returned to Austin on behalf of Aeroméxico from Mexico City, reopened the hub in Guadalajara with an ERJ fleet, which grew to 32 frames. In November 2007, Aeroméxico announced that Aerolitoral was going to become Aeroméxico Connect once the Embraer 190s arrived, and so it did. The airline changed its corporate name, image, and introduced a new philosophy of complementing Aeroméxico on some domestic and international flights, instead of only feeding the airline's hubs. The first four brand-new Embraer 190 arrived in October 2007 and early 2008, and the airline announced an order for 12 more frames that started arriving in early 2009. On November, SkyTeam painted Aeroméxico Connect's ERJ 145 in SkyTeam livery.

=== Bankruptcy ===
The COVID-19 pandemic deeply affected the global aviation industry, including Aeroméxico. Aeroméxico's stock dropped during first half of 2020 and rumors about bankruptcy. On June 30, Aeroméxico voluntarily filed for Chapter 11 bankruptcy in the United States. However, day-to-day operations continued as the company restructured. Existing tickets were honored and employees continued to be paid as usual.

== Destinations ==
Aeroméxico Connect has grown over the past few years in the Mexican domestic market. It has come from being a feeder airline to a key on Aeroméxico's strategy to remain in the industry. As new aircraft have been added since 2004, Aeroméxico has been shifting many of its domestic and short-haul international routes to Aeroméxico Connect. The intended plan of the holding consortium of the two airlines is to keep developing Aeroméxico Connect in those markets where mainline Aeroméxico would not profit, moreover after the addition of the Embraer 190 that is capable of operating on some longer routes that were formerly served by mainline Aeroméxico with McDonnell Douglas DC-9 and MD-87 aircraft. Also of interest is the airline´s choice to replace its ERJ 145 fleet with newer Embraer 170 and 190 jets, currently under manufacture for Aeroméxico. Three new Embraer 170s arrived in the summer of 2012. They fully replaced the ERJ 145 in 2017. The airline serves international destinations in Dominican Republic, El Salvador, Guatemala, Honduras, Nicaragua, and the United States, while offering serving regional routes throughout Mexico.

== Fleet ==
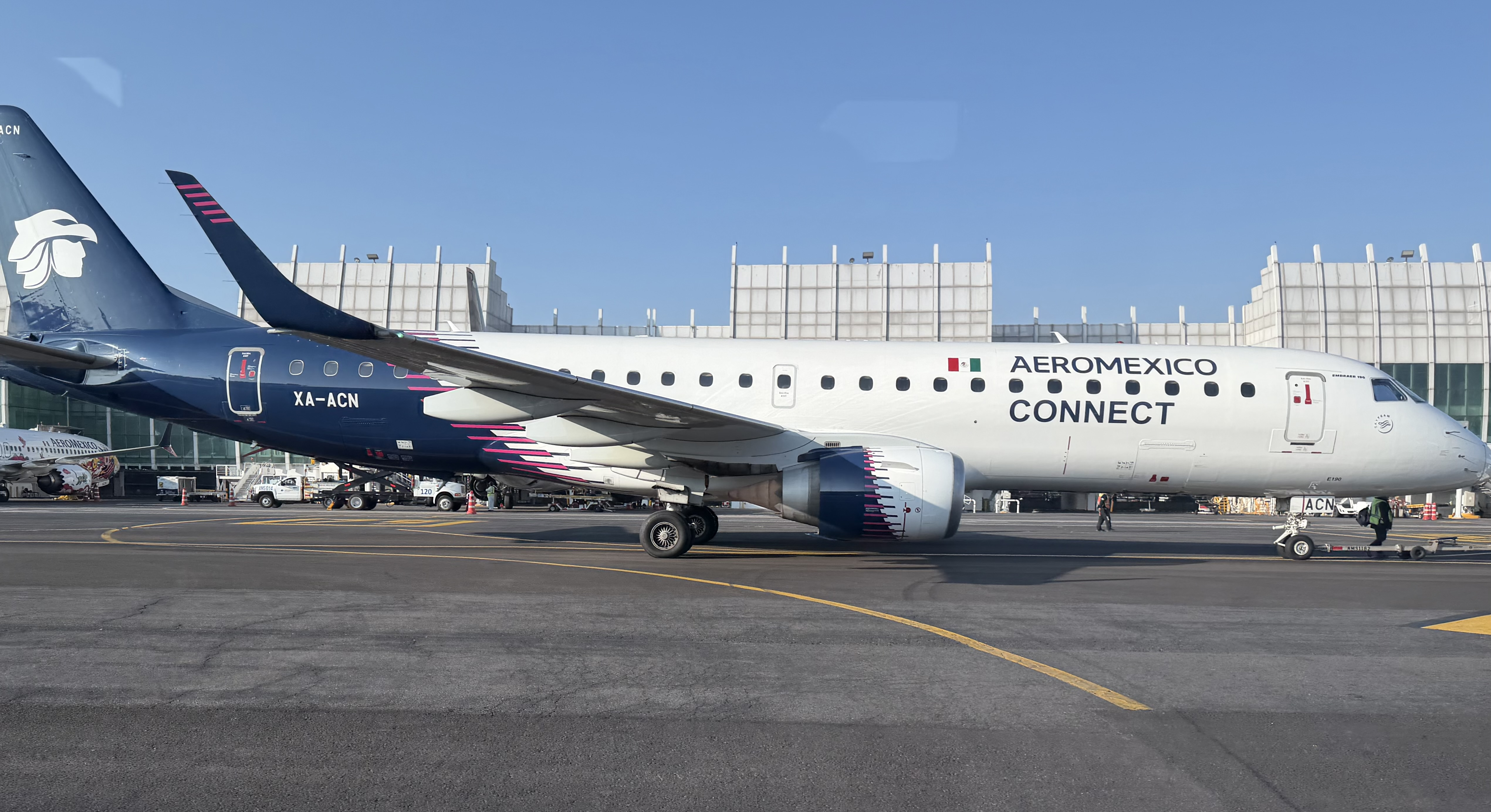
Aeroméxico Connect Embraer 190

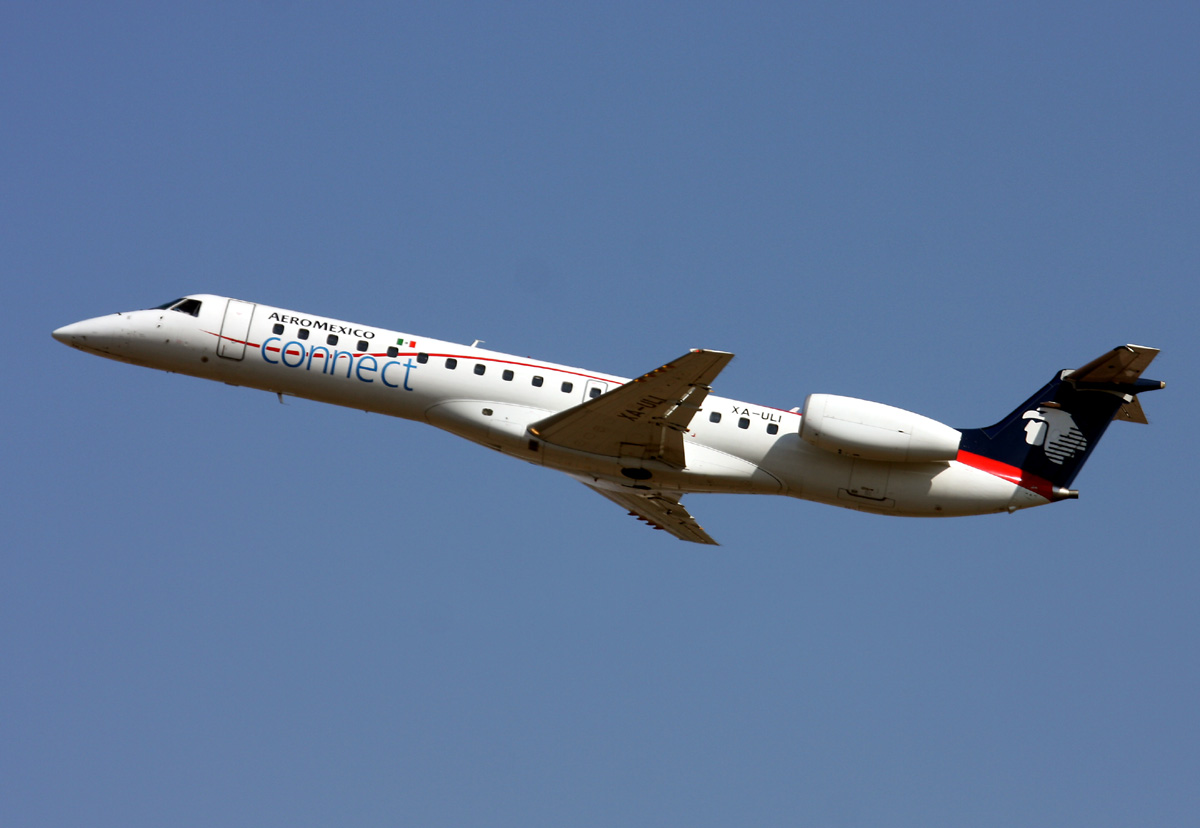
Former Aeroméxico Connect ERJ 145 in 2011

=== Current fleet ===
As of July 2025, Aeroméxico Connect operates the following aircraft:

Aircraft	In service	Orders	Passengers			Notes
Aircraft	In service	Orders	J	Y	Total	Notes
Embraer 190	34	—	11	88	99	
Total	34	—				

=== Historic fleet ===
Aeroméxico Connect also previously operated the following aircraft types:

Aircraft	Total	Introduced	Retired
Embraer 145	40	2007	2017
Embraer 170	13	2012	2020
Embraer 175	3	2013	2017
Fairchild Metroliner	23	1991	1999
Saab 340	9	1999	2010

== Accidents and incidents ==
Aeroméxico Connect and its predecessor, Aerolitoral, have never had an accident with loss of life, although it has had 6 accidents, with 2 hull losses.

- On 6 September 2001 at 12:35 local time, an Aerolitoral Saab 340 (registered XA-ACK) encountered a failure of its second engine, forcing the pilots to perform an emergency landing on a field in Valle de Las Palmas. The aircraft had been operating Flight 2130 from Ciudad Juárez to Tijuana with 29 passengers and three crew members on board, none of whom were seriously injured even though the airplane was damaged beyond repair.
- On 21 January 2010 at 12:24 local time, Aeroméxico Connect Flight 2051 from Hermosillo to Los Angeles veered off the runway upon diverting at Tijuana International Airport in bad weather conditions which included gusty winds. There were no injuries among the 39 people on board the Embraer ERJ 145 involved (registered XA-WAC), which was repaired and returned to service.
- On 10 May 2010, an Embraer ERJ 145 operating as Aeroméxico Connect Flight 921 reported an unsafe gear indication upon approach. Onboard the flight, with service to Mexico City from Monterrey, were 27 passengers. The crew aborted the approach and entered a holding for troubleshooting, the unsafe indication continued. After a subsequent low approach, the tower reported all gear appeared to be properly down. The airplane landed safely about 30 minutes after aborting the first approach.
- On 23 June 2011, Aeroméxico Connect Flight 2471 with service to Mexico City from Nuevo Laredo, was hit by two bolts of lightning. The Embraer ERJ 145, registered XA-SLI with 43 people on board, suffered system damage. Smells of smoke in the cockpit caused the pilots to divert to Monterrey for a safe landing. No injuries were reported, and the plane sustained minor damage.
- On 17 March 2012, an Embraer ERJ 145 registered XA-TAC encountered a loss of cabin pressure. Flight 2469 was en route to Monterrey from Veracruz with 48 passengers and three crew. At FL320 near Tampico, Tamaulipas, the crew initiated an emergency descent and a diversion to Tampico International Airport. The aircraft landed safely with no injuries reported.
- On 31 July 2018, Aeroméxico Connect Flight 2431, operated by an Embraer 190 registered XA-GAL, crashed while attempting to take off from Durango Airport. Although no one died in the accident, the resulting fire consumed the aircraft.

== See also ==
- List of active mexican airlines
- Lists of airlines
