= Baggage reclaim =

Airport area where passengers claim baggage

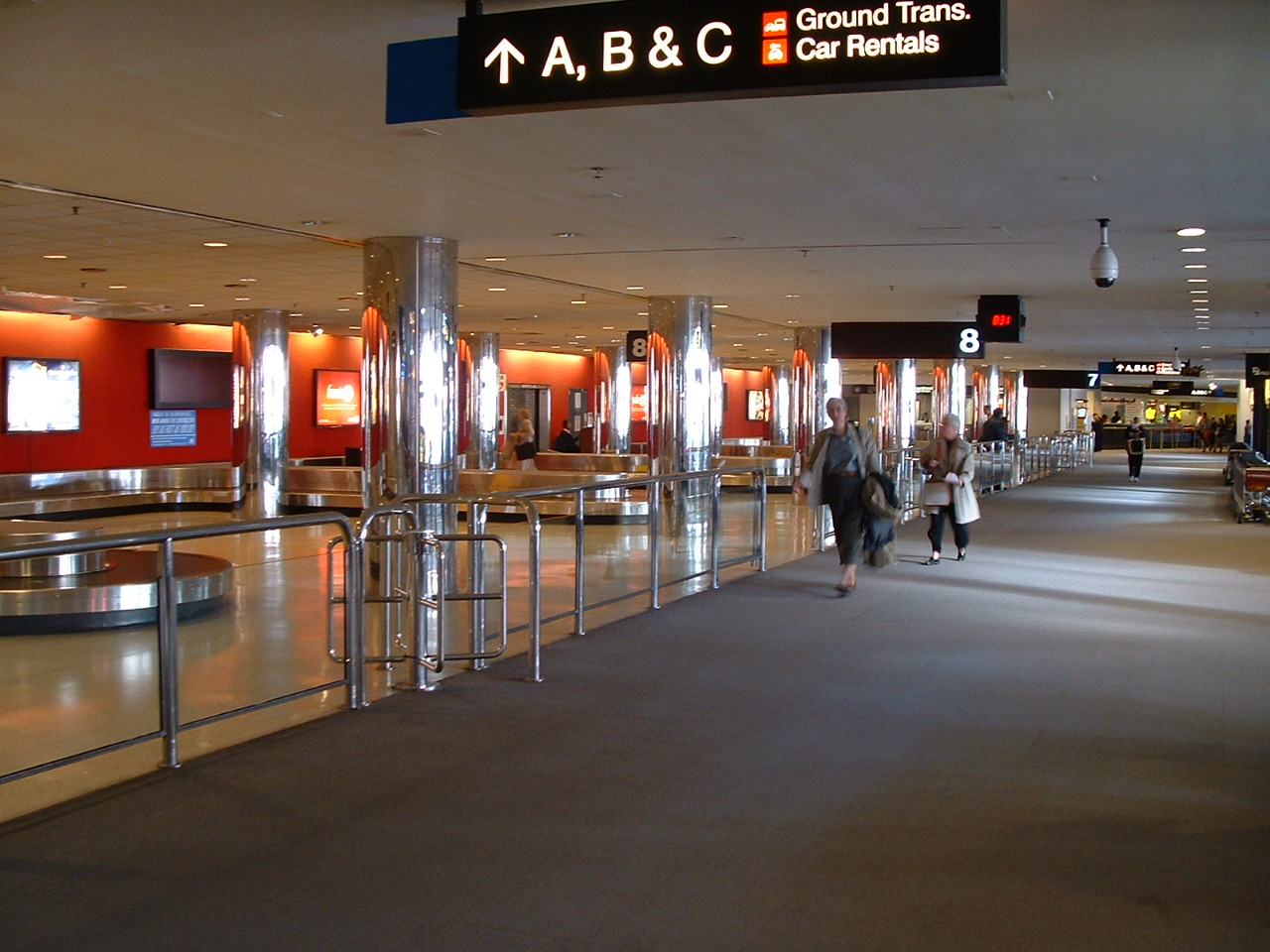
Baggage claim area at the Baltimore-Washington International Thurgood Marshall Airport in 2002. The baggage carousels shown have since been replaced with more modern two-level units.

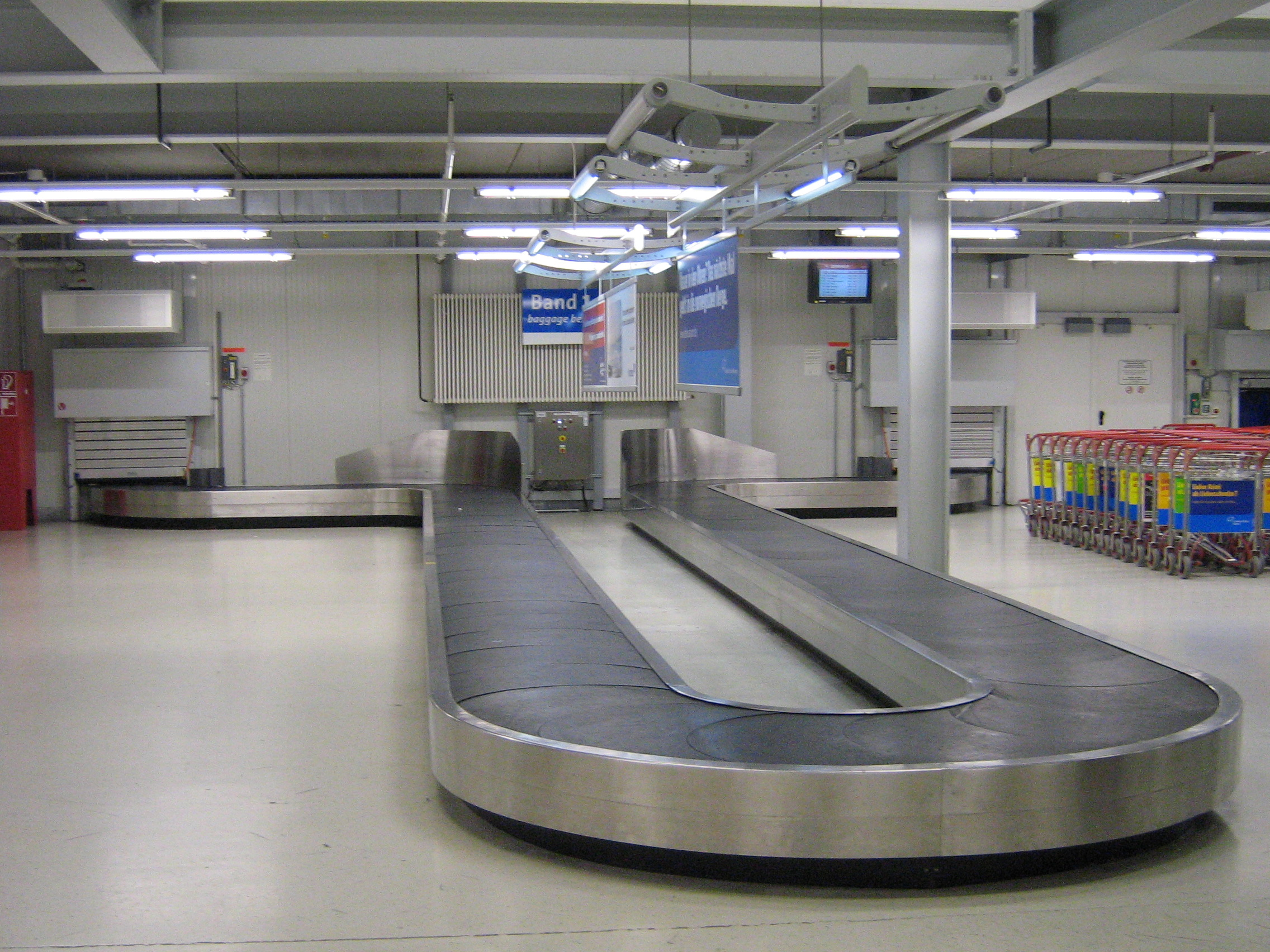
Baggage carousel

In airport terminals, a baggage reclaim area is an area where arriving passengers claim checked-in baggage after disembarking from an airline flight. The alternative term baggage claim is used at airports in the US and some other airports internationally. Similar systems are also used at train stations served by companies that offer checked bags, such as Amtrak in the United States.

== Overview ==
A typical baggage claim area contains baggage carousels or conveyor systems that deliver checked baggage to the passenger. The baggage claim area generally contains the airline's customer service counter for claiming oversized baggage or reporting missing or damaged baggage.

Some airports require that passengers display their baggage receipt obtained at check-in so that it can be positively matched against the bag they are trying to remove from baggage reclaim. Many airports still recommend the baggage receipt is checked against the bag tag of the bag reclaimed. This serves two purposes: first, it reduces baggage theft, and second, it helps to prevent passengers from accidentally leaving the airport with another passenger's bag that bears resemblance to their own.

For international arrivals, the baggage reclaim area is a restricted area, after passport and visa control and before clearing customs, so that all baggage can be inspected by customs agents, but the passenger does not have to handle heavy baggage while moving through the passport booth. In the United States and Canada, and also in some airports in Asia, all arriving international passengers' baggage is reclaimed here and can be re-checked by the airline for connecting flights on the other side of customs (for connection from international to domestic flights in most countries, all passengers must reclaim their baggage). In most other countries passengers transferring to an onward flight do not need to collect their bags unless their airline does not offer to through-check their bags to their final destination. This is required in American and some Canadian airports because international terminals are not enclosed (the only exit is through customs) and often serve domestic flights. The same rule applies in the case of airports that have U.S. border preclearance facilities. This means that passengers continuing onto the U.S. from other cities must retrieve their checked baggage first, then re-check them in after clearing U.S. Customs.

Depending on the airport, the domestic baggage reclaims area may be located next to or shared with the international reclaim area, or sometimes located in the public part of the airport alongside car rental desks and airport exits, and only passengers at their final destination claim their bags here. A shared domestic and international baggage claim is especially common in jurisdictions that employ a red and green channel system for customs, where passengers with goods to declare (carrying goods above the permitted customs limits and/or carrying prohibited items) leave baggage claim through the red channel, which houses the full-scale customs facilities, while passengers with nothing to declare (carrying goods within the permitted customs limits and not carrying prohibited items) go through the green channel, which only houses a one-way gate; in this case, domestic passengers would exit the shared baggage claim through the green channel as they do not have goods which require a customs declaration by definition.

In most large airports in the United States and in some small ones as well, the domestic baggage reclaims are located on a different floor than the ticket counter, usually lower.

== Efficiency of baggage reclaim units ==
The efficiency of baggage reclaim units can be measured in a number of ways including the amount of time a unit is in use for a given flight or the amount of baggage a unit can hold. A number of factors can independently affect the efficiency of a particular unit:

- Aircraft seating capacity
- Proportion of passengers with checked luggage
- Proportion of passengers who are terminating at a given destination
- Average number of luggage pieces per passenger
- Average traveling party size
- Average number of people at baggage reclaim
- Average rate at which luggage are unloaded from the flight (this also depends on the physical properties of checked luggage)
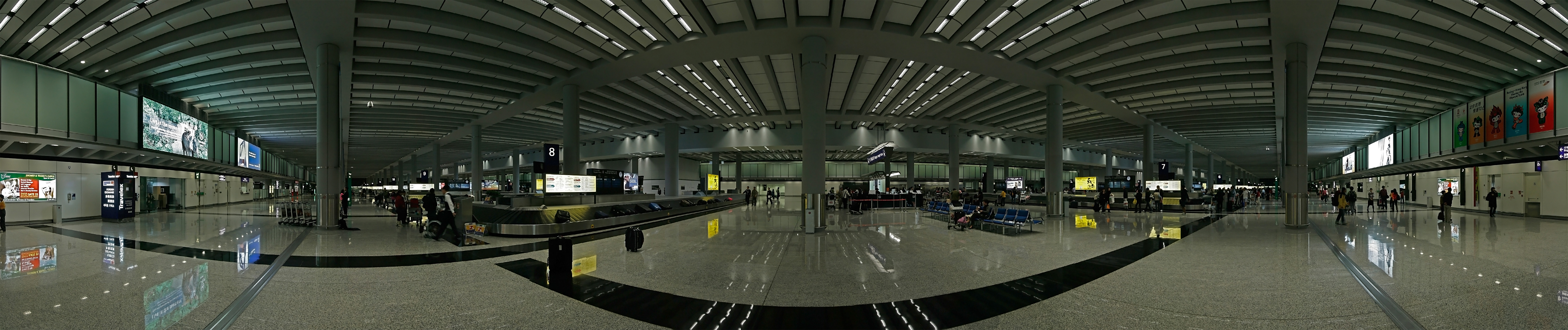
A panoramic view of the baggage reclaim area in Hong Kong International Airport

== See also ==
- Duty-free shop
