= List of airports in Mexico =

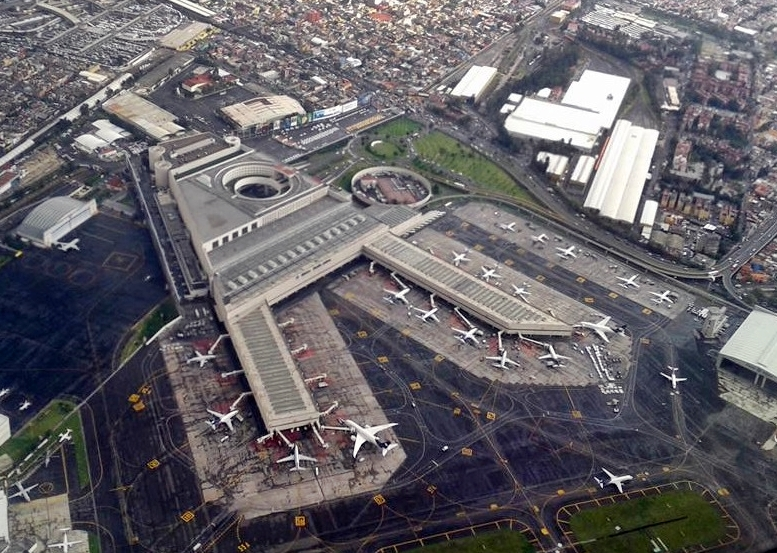
Aerial view of Mexico City International Airport

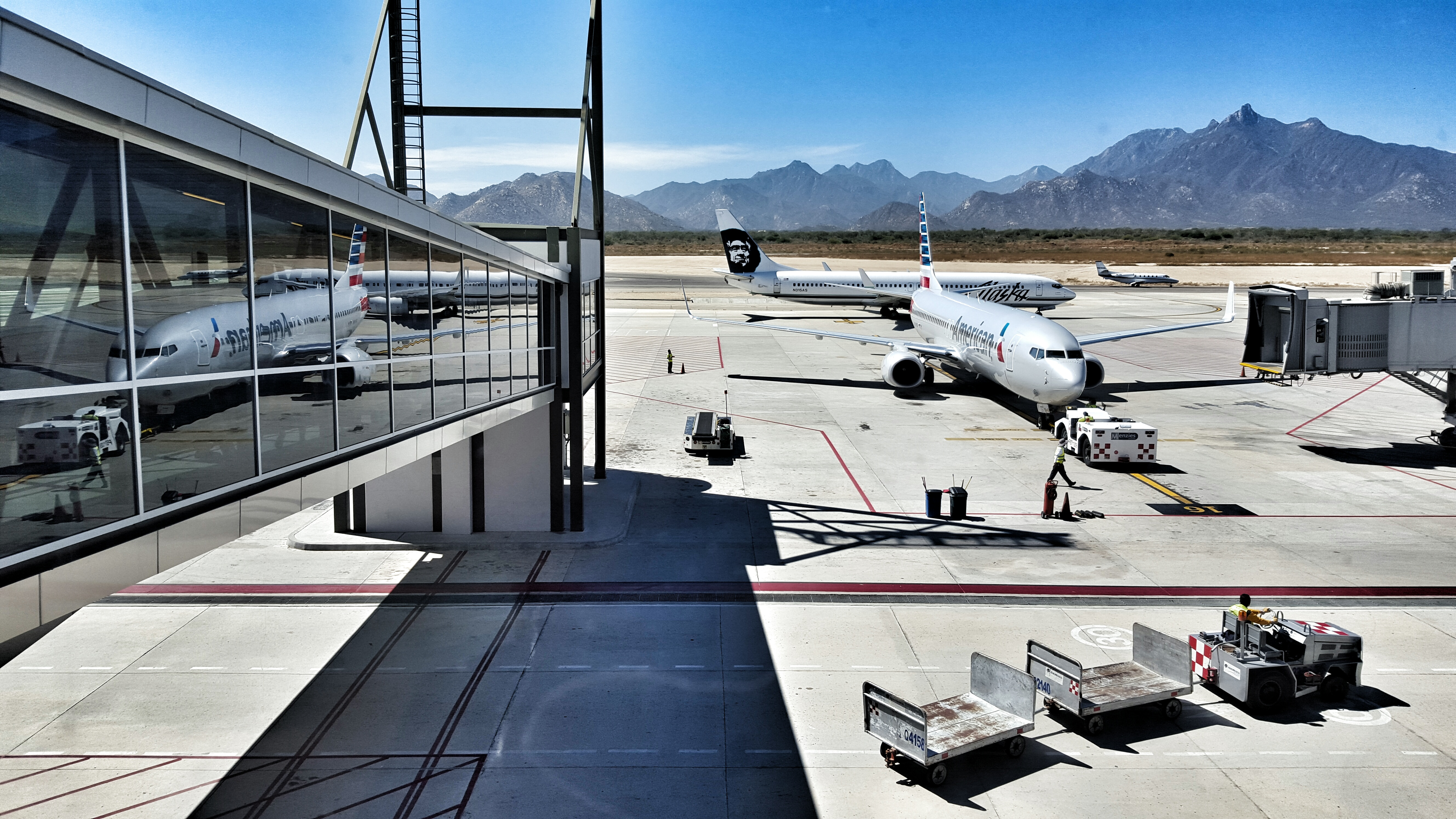
Apron view from Terminal 2 at Los Cabos International Airport

This article lists airports in Mexico, categorized by the largest city served, state, ICAO and IATA codes, and airport name. It includes both public and military airports. Separate Wikipedia lists cover the busiest airports in Mexico, as well as the airports in Baja California, and Baja California Sur. Airports with scheduled passenger flights on commercial airlines are in bold. Airports with international service additionally list the city name in bold, with data as of 2025.

Mexico has a vast aviation network, with 1,527 registered airfields and 80 officially recognized airports as of 2025, ranking 4th globally after the U.S., Brazil, and Australia. Among these, 64 airports have scheduled commercial flights, with 37 handling both domestic and international passenger services, while 27 serve only domestic destinations. The country also has 20 Air Force bases, 10 Air Force stations, 13 Naval Air Bases, and 5 Naval Air Stations, most of which share facilities with civil aviation rather than operating independently. Additionally, hundreds of airfields and airstrips remain scattered across the country, many dating back to a time when limited road infrastructure made air travel crucial for connecting remote areas and supporting military logistics.

Mexico’s airport system is managed by both public and private operators, with the Federal Civil Aviation Agency (AFAC) overseeing regulations and safety. In 1995, the government launched a major airport privatization effort through the 'Ley de Aeropuertos' (Airports Law), transferring most state-owned airports to private operators: Grupo Aeroportuario del Sureste (ASUR), Grupo Aeroportuario del Pacífico (GAP), and Grupo Aeroportuario del Centro Norte (OMA). In 2023, the government expanded military involvement in infrastructure, creating the military-owned Grupo Olmeca-Maya-Mexica (OMM), which took over several previously government-operated airports. A small number of airports remain under state control, managed by Aeropuertos y Servicios Auxiliares (ASA) and other public entities.

== Airports ==
City served	State	ICAO	IATA	Airport name
Civil airports and airfields
**Acapulco**	Guerrero	MMAA	ACA	**Acapulco International Airport**
**Aguascalientes**	Aguascalientes	MMAS	AGU	**Aguascalientes International Airport**
Álamos	Sonora		XAL	Álamos National Airport
Apatzingán	Michoacán	MMAG	AZG	Pablo L Sidar National Airport
Campeche	Campeche	MMCP	CPE	**Ing. Alberto Acuña Ongay International Airport**
Cananea	Sonora	MMCA	CNA	Cananea National Airport
**Cancún**	Quintana Roo	MMUN	CUN	**Cancún International Airport**
Cedros Island	Baja California	MMCD		**Isla de Cedros Airport**
Celaya	Guanajuato	MMCY	CYW	Captain Rogelio Castillo National Airport
Chetumal	Quintana Roo	MMCM	CTM	**Chetumal International Airport**
Chichen Itza	Yucatán	MMCT	CZA	Chichen Itza International Airport
**Chihuahua**	Chihuahua	MMCU	CUU	**General Roberto Fierro Villalobos International Airport**
Chilpancingo	Guerrero	MMCH		Chilpancingo National Airport
Ciudad Acuña	Coahuila	MMCC	ACN	Ciudad Acuña International Airport
Ciudad Altamirano	Guerrero			Santa Barbara Regional Airport
Ciudad Constitución	Baja California Sur	MMDA	CUA	**Ciudad Constitución Airport**
Ciudad del Carmen	Campeche	MMCE	CME	**Ciudad del Carmen International Airport**
Ciudad Juárez	Chihuahua	MMCS	CJS	**Abraham González International Airport**
Ciudad Mante	Tamaulipas	MMDM	MMC	Ciudad Mante National Airport
Ciudad Obregón	Sonora	MMCN	CEN	**Ciudad Obregón International Airport**
Ciudad Victoria	Tamaulipas	MMCV	CVM	**General Pedro J. Méndez International Airport**
Coahuayana	Michoacán			Coahuayana Airfield
Coalcomán	Michoacán			Coalcomán Airfield
Colima	Colima	MMIA	CLQ	**Lic. Miguel de la Madrid Airport**
Córdoba/Orizaba	Veracruz	MM20		Córdoba Airfield
**Cozumel**	Quintana Roo	MMCZ	CZM	**Cozumel International Airport**
Creel	Chihuahua	MMGA		**Barrancas del Cobre Regional Airport**
Cuajinicuilapa	Guerrero			Aeropuerto Nacional Ta Lo De Soto
Cuatro Ciénegas	Coahuila			Cuatro Ciénegas Airfield
Cuernavaca	Morelos	MMCB	CVJ	General Mariano Matamoros Airport
**Culiacán**	Sinaloa	MMCL	CUL	**Culiacán International Airport**
**Durango**	Durango	MMDO	DGO	**Durango International Airport**
El Fuerte	Sinaloa			El Fuerte Airfield
Ensenada	Baja California	MMES	ESE	**Ensenada Airport**
Felipe Carrillo Puerto	Quintana Roo	MM55		Felipe Carrillo Puerto Airfield
**Guadalajara**	Jalisco	MMGL	GDL	**Guadalajara International Airport**
Guasave	Sinaloa			Campo Cuatro Milpas Airport
Guaymas	Sonora	MMGM	GYM	**General José María Yáñez International Airport**
Guerrero Negro	Baja California Sur	MMGR	GUB	**Guerrero Negro Airport** (Baja California)
**Hermosillo**	Sonora	MMHO	HMO	**Hermosillo International Airport**
Holbox	Quintana Roo			Holbox Airfield
**Huatulco**	Oaxaca	MMBT	HUX	**Bahías de Huatulco International Airport**
Huetamo	Michoacán			Huetamo Airstrip
**Ixtapa-Zihuatanejo**	Guerrero	MMZH	ZIH	**Ixtapa-Zihuatanejo International Airport**
Ixtepec	Oaxaca	MMIT	IZT	**Ixtepec Airport**
**La Paz**	Baja California Sur	MMLP	LAP	**Manuel Márquez de León International Airport**
La Piedad	Michoacán			La Piedad Airstrip
Lagos de Moreno	Jalisco		LOM	Francisco Primo de Verdad National Airport
Lázaro Cárdenas	Michoacán	MMLC	LZC	**Lázaro Cárdenas Airport**
**León****/Bajío**	Guanajuato	MMLO	BJX	**Del Bajío International Airport**
**Loreto**	Baja California Sur	MMLT	LTO	**Loreto International Airport**
**Los Cabos**	Baja California Sur	MMSL	CSW	**Cabo San Lucas International Airport**
**Los Cabos**	Baja California Sur	MMSD	SJD	**Los Cabos International Airport**
Los Mochis	Sinaloa	MMLM	LMM	**Federal del Valle del Fuerte International Airport**
**Manzanillo**	Colima	MMZO	ZLO	**Playa de Oro International Airport**
Matamoros	Tamaulipas	MMMA	MAM	**General Servando Canales International Airport**
Matehuala	San Luis Potosí			Engineer Manuel Moreno Torres National Airport
**Mazatlán**	Sinaloa	MMMZ	MZT	**Mazatlán International Airport**
**Mérida**	Yucatán	MMMD	MID	**Mérida International Airport**
Mexicali	Baja California	MMML	MXL	**Mexicali International Airport**
**Mexico City**	Mexico City	MMMX	MEX	**Mexico City International Airport**
**Mexico City**	Mexico City	MMSM	NLU	**Felipe Ángeles International Airport**
Mexico City	Mexico City	MMJC	AZP	Atizapán National Airport
Minatitlán	Veracruz	MMMT	MTT	**Minatitlán National Airport**
Monclova	Coahuila	MMMV	LOV	Venustiano Carranza International Airport
**Monterrey**	Nuevo León	MMMY	MTY	**Monterrey International Airport**
Monterrey	Nuevo León	MMAN	NTR	Del Norte International Airport
**Morelia**	Michoacán	MMMM	MLM	**Morelia International Airport**
Muzquiz	Coahuila			Muzquiz Airfield
Navojoa	Sonora	MMNV	NVJ	Navojoa Airport
Nogales	Sonora	MMNG	NOG	Nogales International Airport
Nueva Rosita	Coahuila			Nueva Rosita Airfield
Nuevo Casas Grandes	Chihuahua	MMCG	NCG	Nuevo Casas Grandes Municipal Airport
Nuevo Laredo	Tamaulipas	MMNL	NLD	**Quetzalcóatl International Airport**
**Oaxaca**	Oaxaca	MMOX	OAX	**Oaxaca International Airport**
Pachuca	Hidalgo	MMPC		Ingeniero Juan Guillermo Villasana National Airport
Pajacuarán	Michoacán			Pajacuarán Airfield
Palenque	Chiapas	MMPQ	PQM	**Palenque International Airport**
Pátzcuaro	Michoacán			Pátzcuaro Airfield
Piedras Negras	Coahuila	MMPG	PDS	**Piedras Negras International Airport**
Playa del Carmen	Quintana Roo		PCM	Playa del Carmen Airport
Poza Rica	Veracruz	MMPA	PAZ	El Tajín National Airport
**Puebla**	Puebla	MMPB	PBC	**Hermanos Serdán International Airport**
Puerto Balleto	Nayarit			**Maria Madre Island Naval Air Station**
**Puerto Escondido**	Oaxaca	MMPS	PXM	**Puerto Escondido International Airport**
Puerto Peñasco	Sonora	MMPE	PPE	Puerto Peñasco International Airport
**Puerto Vallarta**	Jalisco	MMPR	PVR	**Puerto Vallarta International Airport**
**Querétaro**	Querétaro	MMQT	QRO	**Querétaro International Airport**
Reynosa	Tamaulipas	MMRX	REX	**General Lucio Blanco International Airport**
Rio Verde	San Luis Potosí			Rio Verde Airfield
Saltillo	Coahuila	MMIO	SLW	Plan de Guadalupe International Airport
San Felipe	Baja California	MMSF	SFH	San Felipe International Airport
**San Luis Potosí**	San Luis Potosí	MMSP	SLP	**Ponciano Arriaga International Airport**
Santa Rosalía	Baja California Sur			Palo Verde Airport
Santiago Ixcuintla	Nayarit			Santiago Ixcuintla Airfield
**Tampico**	Tamaulipas	MMTM	TAM	**General Francisco Javier Mina International Airport**
Tamuín	San Luis Potosí	MMTN	TSL	Tamuín National Airport
Tapachula	Chiapas	MMTP	TAP	**Tapachula International Airport**
Tehuacán	Puebla	MMHC	TCN	Tehuacán National Airport
Temoris	Chihuahua			Temoris Airstrip
**Tepic**	Nayarit	MMEP	TPQ	**Amado Nervo National Airport**
**Tijuana**	Baja California	MMTJ	TIJ	**Tijuana International Airport**
Toluca/Mexico City	Mexico	MMTO	TLC	**Lic. Adolfo López Mateos International Airport**
**Torreón**	Coahuila	MMTC	TRC	**Francisco Sarabia International Airport**
**Tulum**	Quintana Roo	MMTL	TQO	**Tulum International Airport**
Zapotiltic	Jalisco	MMTX		Zapotiltic National Airport
Tuxtla Gutiérrez	Chiapas	MMTG	TGZ	**Angel Albino Corzo International Airport**
**Uruapan**	Michoacán	MMPN	UPN	**Uruapan International Airport**
Valle de Bravo	Mexico			Valle de Bravo Airfield
**Veracruz**	Veracruz	MMVR	VER	**Veracruz International Airport**
Villahermosa	Tabasco	MMVA	VSA	**Villahermosa International Airport**
Xalapa	Veracruz	MMJA	JAL	El Lencero Airport
**Zacatecas**	Zacatecas	MMZC	ZCL	**General Leobardo C. Ruiz International Airport**
Zamora	Michoacán	MMZM	ZMM	Zamora National Airport
Military only airports
Acapulco	Guerrero	MMPD		Pie de la Cuesta Air Force Base
Agualeguas	Nuevo León			Agualeguas National Airport
Atlangatepec	Tlaxcala	MMTA		Atlangatepec Air Force Station
Ciudad Pemex	Tabasco	MM48		Ciudad Pemex Air Force Base
Comitán	Chiapas	MMCO	CJT	Comitan/Copalar Air Force Base
Irapuato	Guanajuato			Irapuato Air Force Station
Isla Mujeres	Quintana Roo	MMIM	ISJ	Isla Mujeres National Airport
La Pesca	Tamaulipas	MM22		La Pesca Naval Air Base
Loma Bonita	Oaxaca	MX67		Loma Bonita Air Force Station
Puerto Cortés	Baja California Sur			San Lucas Military Airstrip
San Quintín	Baja California			San Quintín Military Airstrip
Santa Gertrudis	Chihuahua	MMSG		Santa Gertrudis Air Force Base
Socorro Island	Colima			Isla Socorro Naval Air Station
Teacapan	Sinaloa			Teacapan Naval Air Station
Tenosique	Tabasco			Tenosique Air Force Station
Tuxpan	Veracruz			Tuxpan Naval Air Base
Tuxtla Gutiérrez	Chiapas	MMTB	TGM	Terán Air Force Base
Zapopan	Jalisco	MMZP		Zapopan Air Force Base
Defunct airports
Querétaro	Querétaro	~~MMQT~~	~~QRO~~	Ing. Fernando Espinoza Gutiérrez International Airport
Salina Cruz	Oaxaca	~~MMSZ~~	~~SCX~~	Salina Cruz Naval Air Base
San Cristóbal de las Casas	Chiapas	~~MMSC~~	~~SZT~~	San Cristóbal de las Casas National Airport
San Luis Río Colorado	Sonora		~~UAC~~	San Luis Río Colorado Airport
Tecate	Baja California			Tecate Airport
Tizimín	Yucatán		~~TZM~~	Cupul National Airport
Tulum	Quintana Roo	~~MMTU~~	~~TUY~~	Tulum Naval Air Base
Zacapu	Michoacán	~~MM47~~		Zacapú Airfield
Zapotiltic	Jalisco	~~MMTX~~		Zapotiltic Airfield
Zitácuaro	Michoacán	~~MMHZ~~		Miguel Carrillo Ayala Aerodome

== See also ==
- Busiest airports in North America
- Busiest airports in Latin America
- Airfields in Baja California
- Airfields in Baja California Sur
- Small airstrips
- Military bases
- Air Force bases
- Naval air bases
- Lists of airports
- International airports
- Defunct airports
- Airports by ICAO code
- Airlines of Mexico
- Airline hubs
- Airline destinations
- Transportation in Mexico
- Tourism in Mexico
- Federal Civil Aviation Agency
- Grupo Aeroportuario del Sureste
- Grupo Aeroportuario del Pacífico
- Grupo Aeroportuario del Centro Norte
- Aeropuertos y Servicios Auxiliares
- List of busiest airports by passenger traffic
- Metropolitan areas of Mexico
