= List of Mexican military installations =

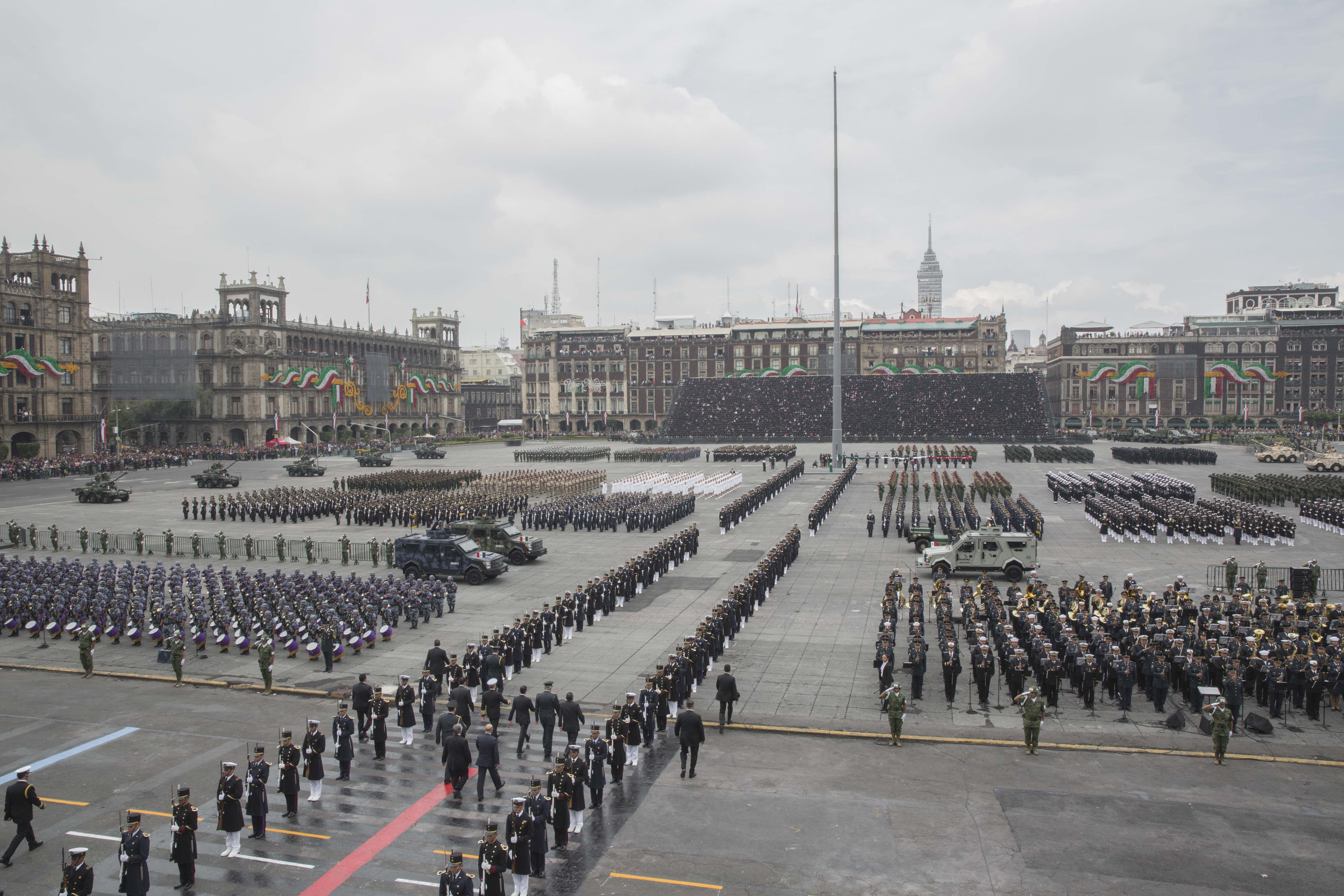
Military Parade Commemorating the 205th Anniversary of the Beginning of Mexico's Independence

This is a list of military installations in Mexico, categorized by location, organizational structure, and type of facility. Mexican military installations are operated by the country's two primary defense institutions, the Department of Defense (Secretaría de la Defensa Nacional) (SEDENA), which oversees the Mexican Army (Ejército Mexicano) and the Mexican Air Force (Fuerza Aérea Mexicana), and the Department of the Navy (Secretaría de Marina) (SEMAR), which commands the Mexican Navy (Armada de México). Additionally, the National Guard (Guardia Nacional), created in recent years, operates under civilian control but relies heavily on SEDENA, SEMAR, and the Secretariat of Security and Civilian Protection for personnel, infrastructure, and logistical support.

== Mexican Army (Ejército Mexicano) ==
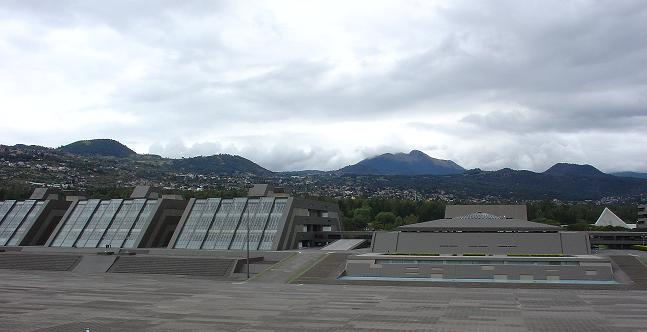
The Heroic Military College is the largest military educational institution in Mexico

=== Military Regions ===
Military Region	Headquarters	States
I	Mexico City	Mexico City, Hidalgo, State of Mexico, Morelos
II	Mexicali	Baja California, Baja California Sur, Sonora
III	Mazatlán	Sinaloa, Durango
IV	Monterrey	Nuevo León, San Luis Potosí, Tamaulipas
V	Zapopan	Aguascalientes, Colima, Jalisco, Nayarit, Zacatecas
VI	Veracruz	Puebla, Tlaxcala, Veracruz
VII	Tuxtla Gutiérrez	Chiapas, Tabasco
VIII	Oaxaca	Oaxaca
IX	Chilpancingo	Guerrero
X	Mérida	Campeche, Quintana Roo, Yucatán
XI	Torreón	Chihuahua, Coahuila
XII	Irapuato	Guanajuato, Michoacán, Querétaro

=== Military Zones ===
Military Zone	Location	State	Military Region
1st	Tacubaya	Mexico City	I
2nd	Tijuana	Baja California	II
3rd	La Paz	Baja California Sur	II
4th	Hermosillo	Sonora	II
5th	Chihuahua	Chihuahua	XI
6th	Saltillo	Coahuila	XI
7th	Apodaca	Nuevo León	IV
8th	Reynosa	Tamaulipas	IV
9th	Culiacán	Sinaloa	III
10th	Durango	Durango	III
11th	Guadalupe	Zacatecas	V
12th	San Luis Potosí	San Luis Potosí	IV
13th	Tepic	Nayarit	V
14th	Aguascalientes	Aguascalientes	V
15th	Zapopan	Jalisco	V
16th	Sarabia	Guanajuato	XII
17th	Querétaro	Querétaro	XII
18th	Pachuca	Hidalgo	I
19th	Tuxpan	Veracruz	VI
20th	Colima	Colima	V
21st	Morelia	Michoacán	XII
22nd	Santa María Rayón	State of Mexico	I
23rd	Panotla	Tlaxcala	VI
24th	Cuernavaca	Morelos	I
25th	Puebla	Puebla	VI
26th	El Lencero	Veracruz	VI
27th	Pie de la Cuesta	Guerrero	IX
28th	Oaxaca	Oaxaca	VIII
29th	Minatitlán	Veracruz	VII
30th	Villahermosa	Tabasco	VII
31st	Rancho Nuevo	Chiapas	VII
32nd	Valladolid	Yucatán	X
33rd	Campeche	Campeche	X
34th	Chetumal	Quintana Roo	X
35th	Chilpancingo	Guerrero	IX
36th	Tapachula	Chiapas	VII
37th	Santa Lucía	State of Mexico	I
38th	Tenosique	Tabasco	VII
39th	Ocosingo	Chiapas	VII
40th	Guerrero Negro	Baja California Sur	II
41st	Puerto Vallarta	Jalisco	V
42nd	Hidalgo del Parral	Chihuahua	XI
43rd	Apatzingán	Michoacán	XII
44th	Miahuatlán	Oaxaca	VIII
45th	Nogales	Sonora	II
46th	Ixtepec	Oaxaca	VIII
47th	Piedras Negras	Coahuila	XI
48th	Ciudad Victoria	Tamaulipas	IV

=== Military Police Brigades ===
Brigade	Location	State	Military Region	References
1st	Tacubaya	Mexico City	I	
2nd	Santa Lucía	State of Mexico	I	
3rd	El Sauz	Sinaloa	III	
4th	General Escobedo	Nuevo León	IV	
5th	San Miguel de los Jagüeyes	State of Mexico	I	
6th	Puebla	Puebla	VI	
7th	Tuxtla Gutiérrez	Chiapas	VII	
10th	Isla Mujeres	Quintana Roo	X	
11th	San Pedro de las Colonias	Coahuila	XI	
12th	Irapuato	Guanajuato	XII	

== Mexican Air Force (Fuerza Aérea Mexicana) ==
=== Mexican Air Force Facilities ===
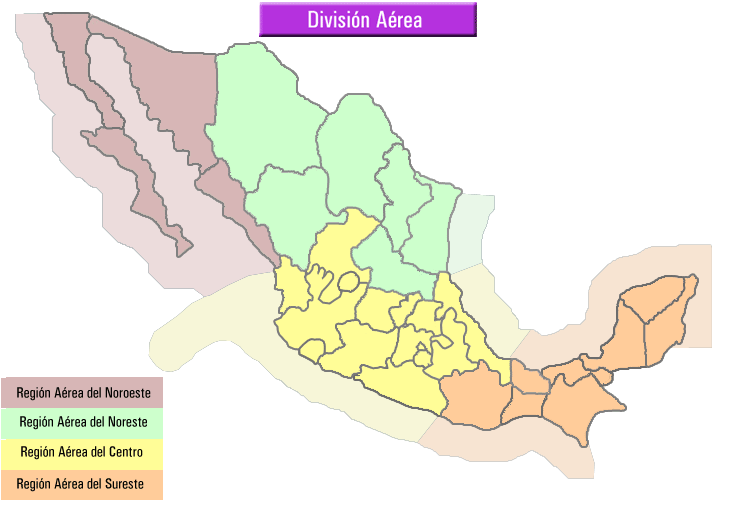
Mexican Air Force Regions

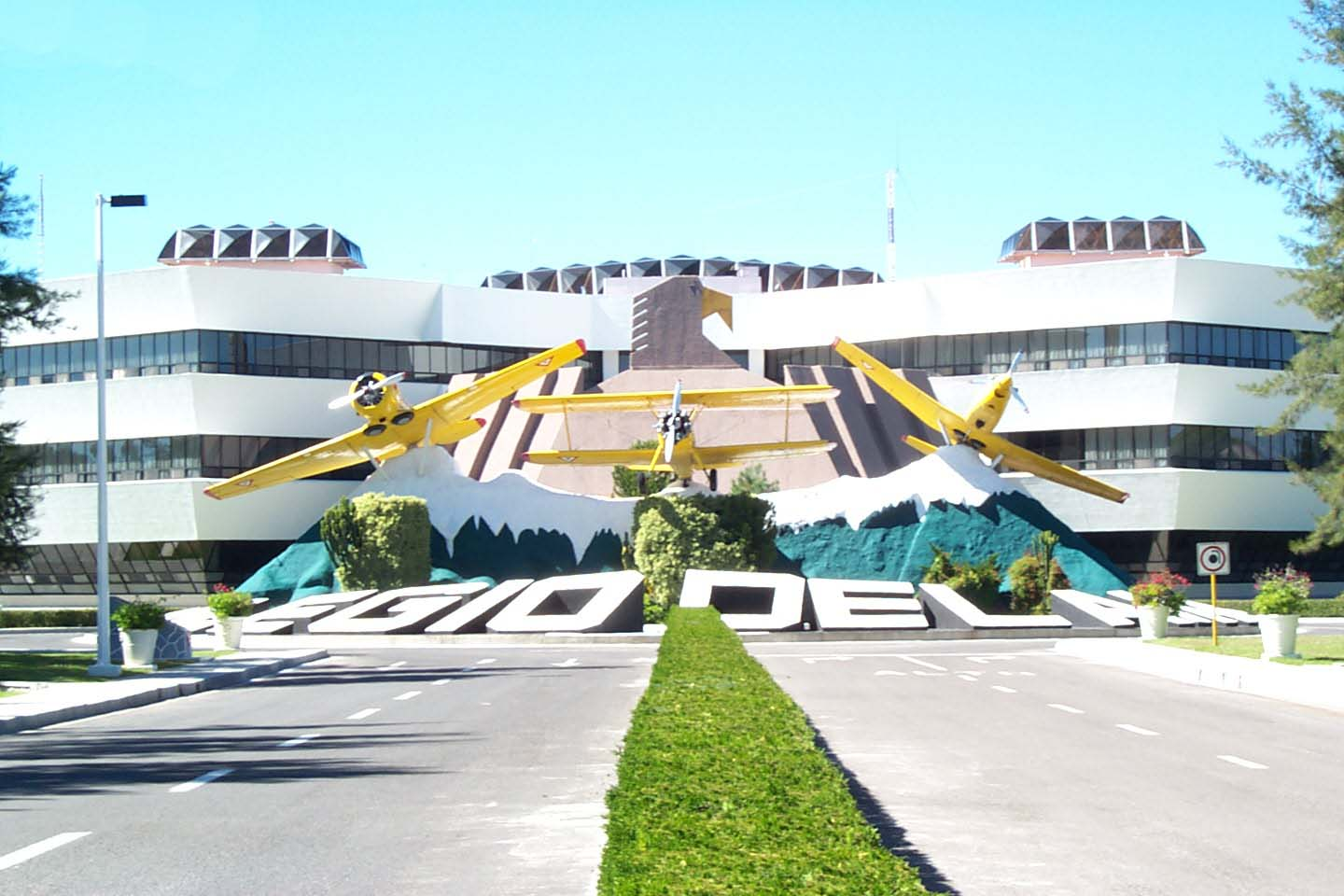
Air Force Academy building in Zapopan

Facility	Totals
Command	1
Air Regions	4
Military Air Bases	20
Military Air Stations	10
Aerial Supply Depots	19
Maintenance Units	8
Electronic Maintenance Units	7
Education Centers	4
Training Centers	3
Radar Stations	3
Military Meteorological Stations	33

=== Air Force Bases (Base Aérea Militar-BAM) ===
Air Force Base	Location	State	Official name	Adjacent Civil Airport
AFB No. 1	Santa Lucía	State of Mexico	BAM N.º 1 Gral. Div. P.A. Alfredo Lezama Álvarez	Mexico City Felipe Ángeles International Airport
AFB No. 2	Ixtepec	Oaxaca	BAM N.º 2 General Div. P.A. Antonio Cárdenas Rodríguez	Ixtepec Airport
AFB No. 3	Ensenada	Baja California	BAM N.º 3 General Div. P.A. Alberto Leopoldo Salinas Carranza	Ensenada Airport
AFB No. 4	Cozumel	Quintana Roo	BAM N.º 4 General Brig. P.A. Eduardo Aldasoro Suárez	Cozumel International Airport
AFB No. 5	Zapopan	Jalisco	BAM N.º 5 Captain P.A. Emilio Carranza Rodríguez	-
AFB No. 6	Tuxtla Gutiérrez	Chiapas	BAM N.º 6 General Ala P.A. Ángel Hipólito Corzo Molina	Francisco Sarabia Airport. Civil until 2006
AFB No. 7	Acapulco	Guerrero	BAM N.º 7 General Div. P.A. Gustavo León González	Pie de la Cuesta Airport. Civil until 1947
AFB No. 8	Mérida	Yucatán	BAM N.º 8 General Div. P.A. Roberto Fierro Villalobos	Mérida International Airport
AFB No. 9	La Paz	Baja California Sur	BAM N.º 9 General Div. P.A. Gustavo Adolfo Salinas Camiña	La Paz International Airport
AFB No. 10	Culiacán	Sinaloa	BAM N.º 10 General Brig. P.A. Radamés Gaxiola Andrade	Culiacán International Airport
AFB No. 11	Santa Gertrudis	Chihuahua	BAM N.º 11 Lieutenant Colonel P.A. Juan Pablo Aldasoro Suárez	-
AFB No. 12	Tijuana	Baja California	BAM N.º 12 Lieutenant Colonel P.A. Horacio Ruiz Gaviño	Tijuana International Airport
AFB No. 13	Chihuahua	Chihuahua	BAM N.º 13 Colonel P.A. Pablo L. Sidar	Chihuahua International Airport
AFB No. 14	Apodaca	Nuevo León	BAM N.º 14 General Div. Ing. Artca. Juan Francisco Azcárate Pino	Del Norte International Airport
AFB No. 15	Oaxaca	Oaxaca	BAM N.º 15 General Div. P.A. Alfonso Cruz Rivera	Oaxaca International Airport
AFB No. 16	Ciudad Pemex	Tabasco	BAM N.º 16 General Div. P.A. Alberto Hipólito Vieytes y Vieytes	-
AFB No. 17	Comitán	Chiapas	BAM N.º 17 General Div. P.A. Luís Farell Cubillas	-
AFB No. 18	Hermosillo	Sonora	BAM N.º 18 General Div. P.A. D.E.M.A. Roberto Salido Beltrán	Hermosillo International Airport
AFB No.19	Mexico City	Mexico City	BAM N.º 19 General Ala P.A. D.E.M.A. Fernando Hernández Vega	Mexico City International Airport
AFB No.20	Tulum	Quintana Roo	BAM N.º 20 General Brig. P.A. Samuel Carlos Rojas Rasso	Tulum International Airport

=== Air Force Stations (Estación Aérea Militar-EAM) ===
Air Force Station	Location	State	Official name	Adjacent Civil Airport
Air Force Station No. 1	Guadalajara	Jalisco	Estación Aérea Militar N.º 1	Guadalajara International Airport
Air Force Station No. 2	Guerrero Negro (San Quintín Municipality)	Baja California	Estación Aérea Militar N.º 2	Guerrero Negro Airport
Air Force Station No. 3	Torreón	Coahuila	Estación Aérea Militar N.º 3	Torreón International Airport
Air Force Station No. 4	Tampico	Tamaulipas	Estación Aérea Militar N.º 4	Tampico International Airport
Air Force Station No. 5	Puerto Vallarta	Jalisco	Estación Aérea Militar N.º 5	Puerto Vallarta International Airport
Air Force Station No. 6	Irapuato	Guanajuato	Estación Aérea Militar N.º 6	-
Air Force Station No. 7	Minatitlán	Veracruz	Estación Aérea Militar N.º 7	Minatitlán International Airport
Air Force Station No. 8	Loma Bonita	Oaxaca	Estación Aérea Militar N.º 8	-
Air Force Station No. 9	Atlangatepec	Tlaxcala	Estación Aérea Militar N.º 9	-
Air Force Station No. 10	Agualeguas	Nuevo León	Estación Aérea Militar N.º 10	-

==== Map of Air Force Facilities ====
Mexican Air Force Facilities
Red = Air Force Base
Green = Air Force Station

== Mexican Navy (Armada de México) ==
=== Mexican Navy Facilities ===
The Naval Force is divided into 8 Naval Regions (Región Naval), 14 Naval Zones (Zona Naval) and 14 Naval Sectors (Sector Naval):

Naval Region	Location	Naval Zone	Location	Naval Sector
Gulf and Caribbean Naval Force
RN-1 Northern Gulf	Tuxpan, Veracruz	ZN-1	Ciudad Madero, Tamaulipas	Matamoros, Tamaulipas
RN-1 Northern Gulf	Tuxpan, Veracruz	ZN-1	Ciudad Madero, Tamaulipas	La Pesca, Tamaulipas
RN-1 Northern Gulf	Tuxpan, Veracruz	ZN-3	Veracruz, Veracruz	Coatzacoalcos, Veracruz
RN-3 Campeche	Ciudad del Carmen, Campeche	ZN-5	Frontera, Tabasco	-
RN-3 Campeche	Ciudad del Carmen, Campeche	ZN-7	Lerma, Campeche	Champotón, Campeche
RN-5 Caribbean	Isla Mujeres, Quintana Roo	ZN-9	Progreso, Yucatán	-
RN-5 Caribbean	Isla Mujeres, Quintana Roo	ZN-11	Chetumal, Quintana Roo	Cozumel, Quintana Roo
Pacific Naval Force
RN-2 Northern Pacific	Ensenada, Baja California	-	Puerto Cortés, Baja California Sur	Puerto Cortés, Baja California Sur
RN-4 Gulf of California	Guaymas, Sonora	ZN-2	La Paz, Baja California Sur	Santa Rosalía, Baja California Sur
RN-4 Gulf of California	Guaymas, Sonora	ZN-2	La Paz, Baja California Sur	Cabo San Lucas, Baja California Sur
RN-4 Gulf of California	Guaymas, Sonora	ZN-4	Mazatlán, Sinaloa	Puerto Peñasco, Sonora
RN-4 Gulf of California	Guaymas, Sonora	ZN-4	Mazatlán, Sinaloa	San Felipe, Baja California
RN-4 Gulf of California	Guaymas, Sonora	ZN-4	Mazatlán, Sinaloa	Topolobampo, Sinaloa
RN-6 Center Pacific	Manzanillo, Colima	ZN-6	San Blas, Nayarit	Isla Socorro, Nayarit
RN-6 Center Pacific	Manzanillo, Colima	ZN-8	Puerto Vallarta, Jalisco	-
RN-6 Center Pacific	Manzanillo, Colima	ZN-10	Lázaro Cárdenas, Michoacán	-
RN-8 South Pacific	Acapulco, Guerrero		-	Ixtapa/Zihuatanejo, Guerrero
RN-8 South Pacific	Acapulco, Guerrero	ZN-12	Salina Cruz, Oaxaca	Huatulco, Oaxaca
RN-8 South Pacific	Acapulco, Guerrero	ZN-14	Puerto Chiapas, Chiapas	

=== Shipyards and Repair Centers ===
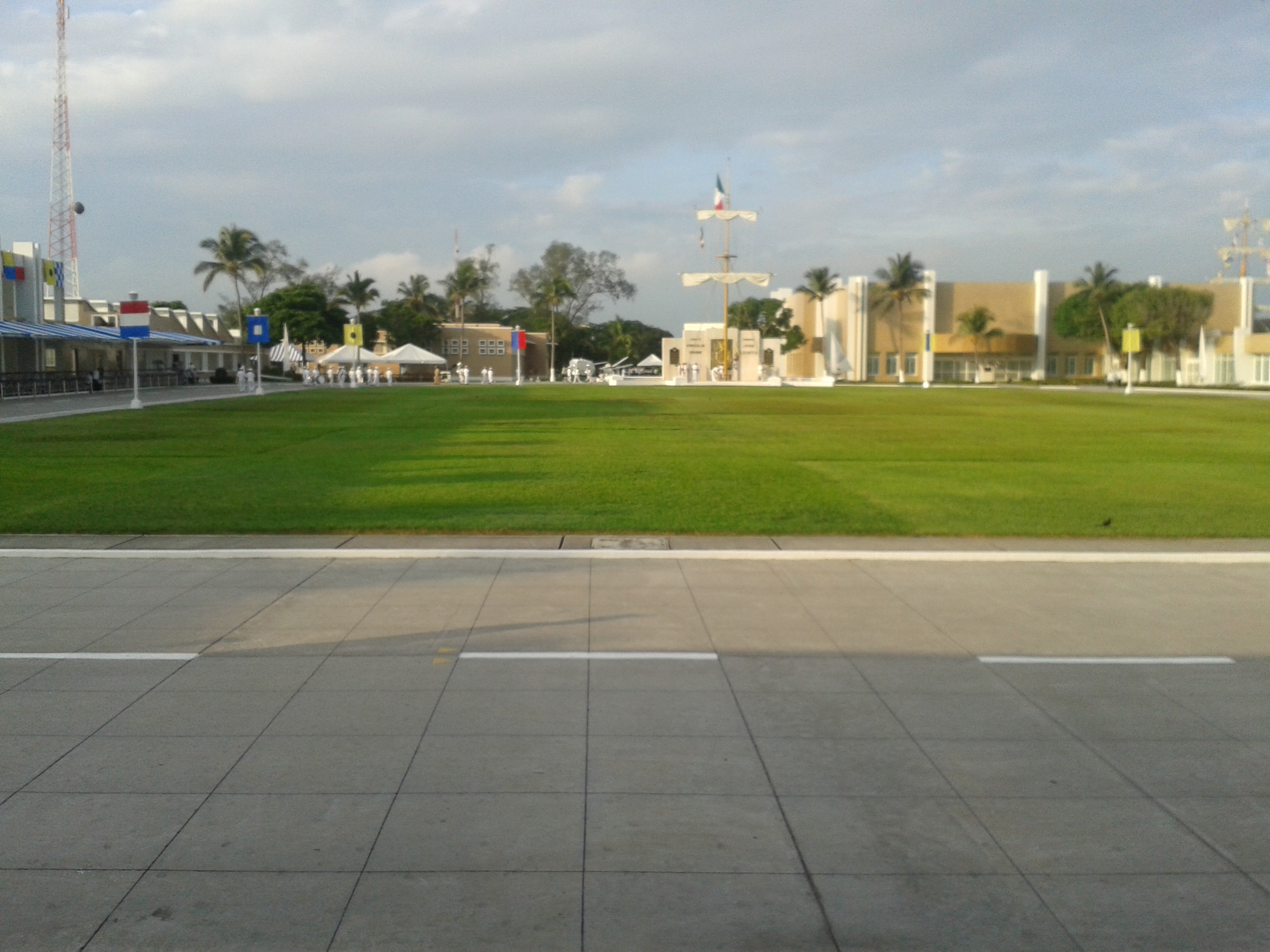
The Heroic Naval Military Academy is the Mexican Navy's officer training academy

Facility	Official name	Location
Naval Shipyard 1	Astillero de Marina (ASTIMAR) 1	Tampico, Tamaulipas
Naval Shipyard 3	Astillero de Marina (ASTIMAR) 3	Coatzacoalcos, Veracruz
Naval Shipyard 6	Astillero de Marina (ASTIMAR) 6	Guaymas, Sonora
Naval Shipyard 18	Astillero de Marina (ASTIMAR) 18	Acapulco, Guerrero
Naval Shipyard 20	Astillero de Marina (ASTIMAR) 20	Salina Cruz, Oaxaca
Naval Repair Center 5	Centro de Reparaciones Navales 5	Frontera, Tabasco
Naval Repair Center 7	Centro de Reparaciones Navales 7	Ciudad del Carmen, Campeche
Naval Repair Center 11	Centro de Reparaciones Navales 11	Chetumal, Quintana Roo
Naval Repair Center 14	Centro de Reparaciones Navales 14	Manzanillo, Colima
National Arsenal 3	Arsenal Nacional Número 3	San Juan de Ulúa, Veracruz

=== Naval Educational Institutions ===
Institution	Official name	Location	Description
The Heroic Naval Military Academy	Heroica Escuela Naval Militar	Antón Lizardo, Veracruz	Future officers are trained for the General Corps of the Navy.
Naval Medical School	Escuela Médico Naval	Mexico City	Provides training in medicine, focusing on naval personnel health.
Naval Engineering School	Escuela de Ingeniería Naval	Antón Lizardo, Veracruz	Offers careers in Electronic Engineering and Naval Communications.
Naval Nursing School	Escuela de Enfermería Naval	Mexico City	Trains officers to assist in medical care across naval and medical facilities.
Naval Aviation School	Escuela de Aviación Naval	La Paz, Baja California Sur	Trains pilots for the Mexican Naval Aviation and other agencies.
Search, Rescue, and Diving School	Escuela de Búsqueda, Rescate y Buceo	Acapulco, Guerrero	Trains Navy personnel and state officers in search and rescue operations.
Naval University	Universidad Naval	N/A	Offers a wide range of naval education and training.
Naval Systems Engineering School	Escuela de Ingeniería en Sistemas Navales	N/A	Offers engineering degrees focused on naval systems.
Aeronaval Systems Engineering School	Escuela de Ingeniería en Sistemas Aeronavales	N/A	Specializes in aeronautical and naval systems engineering.
Hydrography Engineering School	Escuela de Ingeniería en Hidrografía	N/A	Focuses on hydrography, mapping, and oceanography.
Naval Logistics School	Escuela de Intendencia Naval	N/A	Trains officers in naval logistics and resource management.
Naval Machinery School	Escuela de Maquinaria Naval	N/A	Focuses on naval machinery and maintenance training.
Naval Electronics School	Escuela de Electrónica Naval	N/A	Trains officers in naval electronics and communications.
Naval Health Sciences Study Center	Centro de Estudios Navales en Ciencias de la Salud	N/A	Offers medical and health sciences education for the Navy.
Naval Aviation Study Center	Centro de Estudios Aeronavales	N/A	Offers education in aeronaval sciences.
Naval Aviation Mechanics School	Escuela de Mecánica de Aviación Naval	N/A	Focuses on the mechanics and maintenance of naval aircraft.
Naval Flight Crew Training Center	Centro de Capacitación y Entrenamiento para Tripulaciones de Vuelo	N/A	Flight crew training center
Maritime Survival Training Center	Centro de Capacitación Integral para Supervivencia en la Mar	N/A	Provides survival training for naval personnel at sea
Mexican Navy Training and Development Center	Centro de Formación y Capacitación de la Armada de México	N/A	Comprehensive training for Mexican Navy personnel
Strategic Research Institute	Instituto de Investigaciones Estratégicas de la Armada de México	N/A	Focuses on strategic military research for the Navy
Naval Health Sciences Research Institute	Instituto de Investigaciones en Ciencias de la Salud de la SEMAR	N/A	Research in health sciences for naval personnel
Gulf and Caribbean Oceanographic Institute	Instituto Oceanográfico del Golfo y el Mar Caribe	N/A	Research center for Gulf and Caribbean oceanography
Pacific Oceanographic Institute	Instituto Oceanográfico del Pacífico	N/A	Research center for Pacific oceanography
Marine Infantry Training Center	Centro de Capacitación y Adiestramiento Especializado de la Infantería de Marina	N/A	Specialized training for marine infantry
Command and Control Training Center	Centro de Capacitación para el Sistema de Mando y Control	N/A	Provides training in naval command and control systems
Sailing Training Center	Centro de Capacitación y Adiestramiento de Vela	N/A	Sail training for naval personnel
Marine Infantry Training Center (CAIMSMN 1)	Centro de Adiestramiento de Infantería de Marina del Servicio Militar Nacional (CAIMSMN) 1	Ciudad Madero, Tamaulipas	Training center for Marine Infantry
Marine Infantry Training Center (CAIMSMN 2)	CAIMSMN 2	Ensenada, Baja California	Training center for Marine Infantry
Marine Infantry Training Center (CAIMSMN 3)	CAIMSMN 3	Veracruz, Veracruz	Training center for Marine Infantry
Marine Infantry Training Center (CAIMSMN 4)	CAIMSMN 4	Guaymas, Sonora	Training center for Marine Infantry
Marine Infantry Training Center (CAIMSMN 5)	CAIMSMN 5	Ciudad del Carmen, Campeche	Training center for Marine Infantry
Marine Infantry Training Center (CAIMSMN 6)	CAIMSMN 6	Lázaro Cárdenas, Michoacán	Training center for Marine Infantry
Marine Infantry Training Center (CAIMSMN 7)	CAIMSMN 7	Isla Mujeres, Quintana Roo	Training center for Marine Infantry
Marine Infantry Training Center (CAIMSMN 8)	CAIMSMN 8	Acapulco, Guerrero	Training center for Marine Infantry
Marine Infantry Training Center (CAIMSMN 9)	CAIMSMN 9	Tuxpan, Veracruz	Training center for Marine Infantry
Marine Infantry Training Center (CAIMSMN 10)	CAIMSMN 10	Salina Cruz, Oaxaca	Training center for Marine Infantry
Marine Infantry Training Center (CAIMSMN 11)	CAIMSMN 11	Coatzacoalcos, Veracruz	Training center for Marine Infantry
Marine Infantry Training Center (CAIMSMN 12)	CAIMSMN 12	Mazatlán, Sinaloa	Training center for Marine Infantry
Marine Infantry Training Center (CAIMSMN 14)	CAIMSMN 14	Puerto Vallarta, Jalisco	Training center for Marine Infantry
Marine Infantry Training Center (CAIMSMN 15)	CAIMSMN 15	Lerma, Campeche	Training center for Marine Infantry
Marine Infantry Training Center (CAIMSMN 16)	CAIMSMN 16	Manzanillo, Colima	Training center for Marine Infantry
Marine Infantry Training Center (CAIMSMN 17)	CAIMSMN 17	Yukalpetén, Yucatán	Training center for Marine Infantry
Marine Infantry Training Center (CAIMSMN 18)	CAIMSMN 18	Puerto Chiapas, Chiapas	Training center for Marine Infantry
Marine Infantry Training Center (CAIMSMN 19)	CAIMSMN 19	Chetumal, Quintana Roo	Training center for Marine Infantry
Marine Infantry Training Center (CAIMSMN 20)	CAIMSMN 20	Puerto Peñasco, Sonora	Training center for Marine Infantry
Marine Infantry Training Center (CAIMSMN 21)	CAIMSMN 21	Matamoros, Tamaulipas	Training center for Marine Infantry
Marine Infantry Training Center (CAIMSMN 22)	CAIMSMN 22	La Paz, Baja California Sur	Training center for Marine Infantry

=== Naval Air Force Facilities ===
Naval Air Force Base	Location	State	Adjacent Civil Airport
Gulf of Mexico Naval Air Force
Tuxpan Naval Air Base	Tuxpan	Veracruz	-
Tampico Naval Air Base	Tampico	Tamaulipas	Tampico International Airport
La Pesca Naval Air Base	La Pesca	Tamaulipas	-
Las Bajadas Naval Air Base	Veracruz	Veracruz	Veracruz International Airport
Campeche Naval Air Base	Campeche	Campeche	Campeche International Airport
Chetumal Naval Air Base	Chetumal	Quintana Roo	Chetumal International Airport
Isla Mujeres Naval Air Station	Isla Mujeres	Quintana Roo	Isla Mujeres Airport
Pacific Naval Air Force
Manzanillo Naval Air Base	Manzanillo	Colima	-
Guaymas Naval Air Base	Guaymas	Sonora	Guaymas International Airport
La Paz Naval Air Base	La Paz	Baja California Sur	La Paz International Airport
Lázaro Cárdenas Naval Air Base	Lázaro Cárdenas	Michoacán	Lázaro Cárdenas Airport
Acapulco Naval Air Base	Acapulco	Guerrero	Acapulco International Airport
Salina Cruz Naval Air Base	Salina Cruz	Oaxaca	~~Salina Cruz Airport~~ (Defunct)
Tapachula Naval Air Base	Tapachula	Chiapas	Tapachula International Airport
Teacapán Naval Air Station	Teacapán	Sinaloa	-
Isla Socorro Naval Air Station	Isla Socorro	Colima	-
Isla María Madre Naval Air Station	Puerto Balleto	Nayarit	Puerto Balleto Airfield
Mexico City Naval Air Station	Mexico City	Mexico City	Mexico City International Airport

==== Map of Naval Air Force Facilities ====
Mexican Naval Air Force Facilities
Red = Naval Air Force Base
Green = Naval Air Force Station

== See also ==
- Mexican Armed Forces
- Mexican Department of Defense
- Mexican Army
- Mexican Air Force
- Mexican Department of the Navy
- Mexican Navy
- Mexican Naval Aviation
- Mexican National Guard
- List of airports in Mexico
