= Socorro Island Naval Air Station =

Socorro Island Naval Air Station Estación Aeronaval de Isla Socorro
- IATA: none; ICAO: MM81; LID: ISC

Summary
- Airport type: Military
- Operator: Secretariat of the Navy
- Serves: Socorro Island
- Location: Socorro Island
- Commander: Vice Admiral Francisco Ortiz Gómez
- Elevation AMSL: 1,086 ft (331 m)
- Coordinates: 18°46′27″N 110°55′48″W
- Website: www.gob.mx/semar/documentos/directorio-de-mandos-navales%20www.gob.mx/semar/directorio-de-mandos-navales

Map
- Location of the airport in Mexico

Runways
Direction	Length		Surface
Direction	ft	m	Surface
07/25	5,250	1,600	Asphalt
- SEMAR

The Socorro Island Naval Air Station (Spanish: Estación Aeronaval de Isla Socorro) is a military airfield operated by the Mexican Navy on Socorro Island, Colima, Mexico. It is operated by Mexican Navy for its Mexican Naval Aviation. The station provides air transport for naval personnel stationed on the island and their families.

== Background ==
It is located 5 kilometers northwest of the housing complex used by the families of sailors and previously had a runway 1245 meters long and 30 meters wide. Starting in 2008, through a concession granted to Asfaltos Guadalajara S.A.P.I. de C.V., the runway was extended to 1600 meters, adding 90 meters to the north side and 260 meters to the south side. The runway currently has a concrete surface and a width of 50 meters; the airfield includes an apron and a hangar.
