= Mexican Naval Aviation =

Naval Aviation branch of the Mexican Navy

- Fuerza AeroNaval
- Active: 1918-Present
- Country: Mexico
- Branch: Mexican Navy
- Type: Naval aviation
- Role: Aerial Surveillance, Troop Transport, Search and Rescue

Insignia
- Roundel

Mexican Naval Aviation (FAN; Spanish: Fuerza AeroNaval, lit. 'Naval Air Force') is the naval air unit of the Mexican Navy. The Mexican Navy is divided into two naval fleets: Pacific Ocean and Gulf of Mexico.

== History ==
Naval aviation in Mexico dates back to 1918, when a Mexican-made float biplane was successfully tested by Carlos Santa Ana at the Port of Veracruz, In 1926 a squadron of floatplanes were designed and made for the Mexican Navy, but without personnel. Carlos Castillo Breton became the first Mexican naval pilot in 1927 after training in the U.S. and Mexico.

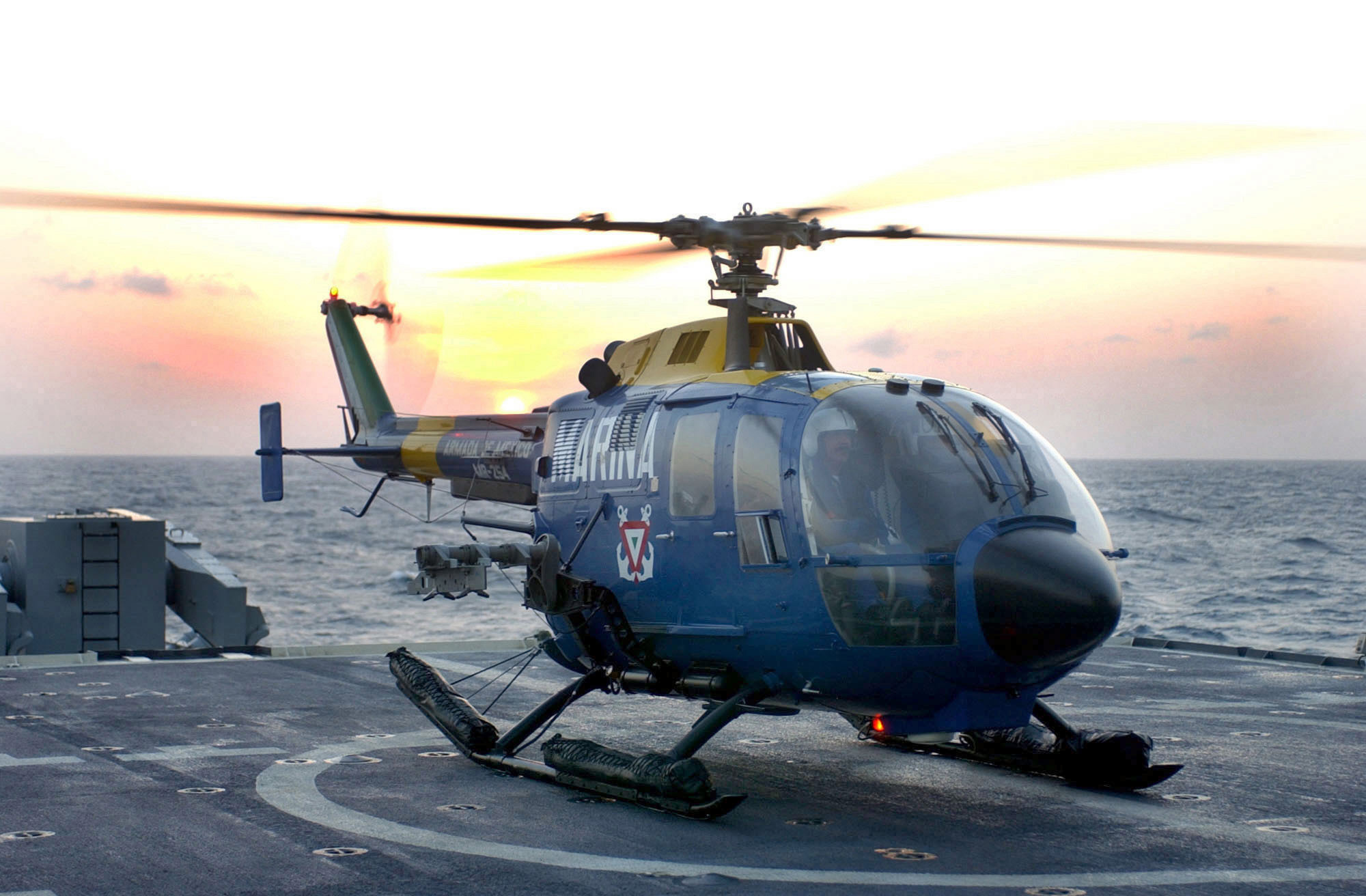

Between 1927 and 1943, more aircraft were acquired, and seven naval officers qualified as pilots, some of whom joined the Mexican Air Force. World War II saw the creation of the Naval Aviation school in 1943 at Las Bajadas, Veracruz. These were also ex-FAM aircraft, used to patrol the Gulf of Mexico for German submarines, and were later used for training at the Naval Aviation School.

Years after the war, Mexican Naval Aviation was assigned to support the ground and sea naval units in search and rescue, coastal patrol, and assistance to the general population in case of emergencies or disasters.

=== 1990s ===
In the 1990s, the Mexican navy started to acquire Russian-built aircraft and helicopters, including the Mil Mi-2, Mil Mi-8 and Antonov An-32B. They also purchased French, U.S. and German-made helicopters and the Finnish-built L-90 Redigo. In 1999 the Mexican navy started a program to build kit planes and light helicopters at Las Bajadas, Veracruz.

=== 2023 ===
In 2023 the Mexican naval aviation reported it had 120 aircraft, of which 68 were fixed-wing in 9 squadrons, and 54 helicopters in 9 squadrons, either land-based or aboard ocean patrol boats and frigates.

Later purchases were three ex-IDF/AF E-2C Hawkeyes, the first arriving in early July 2004. At the end of the same month, the first two EADS upgraded C212-200 Aviocars flew back to Mexico, with the remaining six being upgraded at BAN Las Bajadas, Mexico. Two AS565 Panther helicopters were purchased for shipborne duties, and delivered in 2005.

== Naval Air Bases (Base Aeronaval) ==
=== Facilities ===
Naval Air Force Base	Adjacent Civil Airport	Location	State	Unit	Aircraft
Gulf of Mexico Naval Air Force – HQ in Tuxpan, Veracruz
Tuxpan Naval Air Base	Tuxpan Naval Air Base	Tuxpan	Veracruz		
Tampico Naval Air Base	Tampico International Airport	Tampico	Tamaulipas	1st Air Mobility, Observation and Transport Naval Air Squadron	Mil Mi-17, Lancair IV-P
Tampico Naval Air Base	Tampico International Airport	Tampico	Tamaulipas	1st Shipborne Patrol Naval Air Squadron	AS565 MB, Bo 105CBS-5, MD902
La Pesca Naval Air Base	La Pesca Naval Air Base	La Pesca	Tamaulipas		
Las Bajadas Naval Air Base	Veracruz International Airport	Veracruz	Veracruz	1st Maritime Patrol Naval Air Squadron	CASA C-212PM
Las Bajadas Naval Air Base	Veracruz International Airport	Veracruz	Veracruz	1st Early Warning and Reconnaissance Naval Air Squadron	E-2C Hawkeye 2000
Las Bajadas Naval Air Base	Veracruz International Airport	Veracruz	Veracruz	Naval Aviation School	MD 500, Robinson R22, Schweizer 300, Zlín Z 42
Campeche Naval Air Base	Campeche International Airport	Campeche	Campeche	5th Air Mobility, Observation and Transport Naval Air Squadron	Mi-8
Campeche Naval Air Base	Campeche International Airport	Campeche	Campeche	1st Interception and Reconnaissance Naval Air Squadron	L-90TP, Sabre 60
Chetumal Naval Air Base	Chetumal International Airport	Chetumal	Quintana Roo	1st Patrol Naval Air Squadron	Lancair Super ES, MX-7-180A, RC695
Chetumal Naval Air Base	Chetumal International Airport	Chetumal	Quintana Roo	3rd Air Mobility, Observation and Transport Naval Air Squadron	Mi-8
Isla Mujeres Naval Air Station	Isla Mujeres Airport	Isla Mujeres	Quintana Roo		
Pacific Naval Air Force – HQ in Manzanillo, Colima
Manzanillo Naval Air Base	-	Manzanillo	Colima		
Guaymas Naval Air Base	Guaymas International Airport	Guaymas	Sonora	1st Interception and Reconnaissance Naval Air Squadron	L-90TP, MX-7-180A
La Paz Naval Air Base	La Paz International Airport	La Paz	Baja California Sur	2nd Patrol Naval Air Squadron	RC695, Lancair IV-P
La Paz Naval Air Base	La Paz International Airport	La Paz	Baja California Sur	2nd Air Mobility, Observation and Transport Naval Air Squadron	Mi-8
La Paz Naval Air Base	La Paz International Airport	La Paz	Baja California Sur	2nd Shipborne Patrol Naval Air Squadron	Bo 105CBS-5
La Paz Naval Air Base	La Paz International Airport	La Paz	Baja California Sur	2nd Transport Naval Air Squadron	An-32B
Lázaro Cárdenas Naval Air Base	Lázaro Cárdenas Airport	Lázaro Cárdenas	Michoacán	2nd Search and Rescue Naval Air Squadron	AS555 AF, Mi-2
Acapulco Naval Air Base	Acapulco International Airport	Acapulco	Guerrero	2nd Search and Rescue Naval Air Squadron	AS555 AF, Mi-2
Salina Cruz Naval Air Base	~~Salina Cruz Airport~~ (Defunct)	Salina Cruz	Oaxaca	1st Search and Rescue Naval Air Squadron	AS555 AF, Mi-2
Tapachula Naval Air Base	Tapachula International Airport	Tapachula	Chiapas	4th Patrol Naval Air Squadron	Mi-8
Tapachula Naval Air Base	Tapachula International Airport	Tapachula	Chiapas	4th Air Mobility, Observation and Transport Naval Air Squadron	MX-7-180A, Super Lancair ES
Teacapán Naval Air Station	-	Teacapán	Sinaloa		
Isla Socorro Naval Air Station	-	Isla Socorro	Colima		
Isla María Madre Naval Air Station	Puerto Balleto Airfield	Puerto Balleto	Nayarit		
Mexico City Naval Air Station	Mexico City International Airport	Mexico City	Mexico City	1st Transport Naval Air Squadron	Gulfstream G450, Learjet 25, Learjet 31, Learjet 60, DHC-8-Q202

=== Map of Naval Air Force Facilities ===
Mexican Naval Air Force Facilities
Red = Naval Air Force Base
Green = Naval Air Force Station

== Aircraft ==
=== Current inventory ===
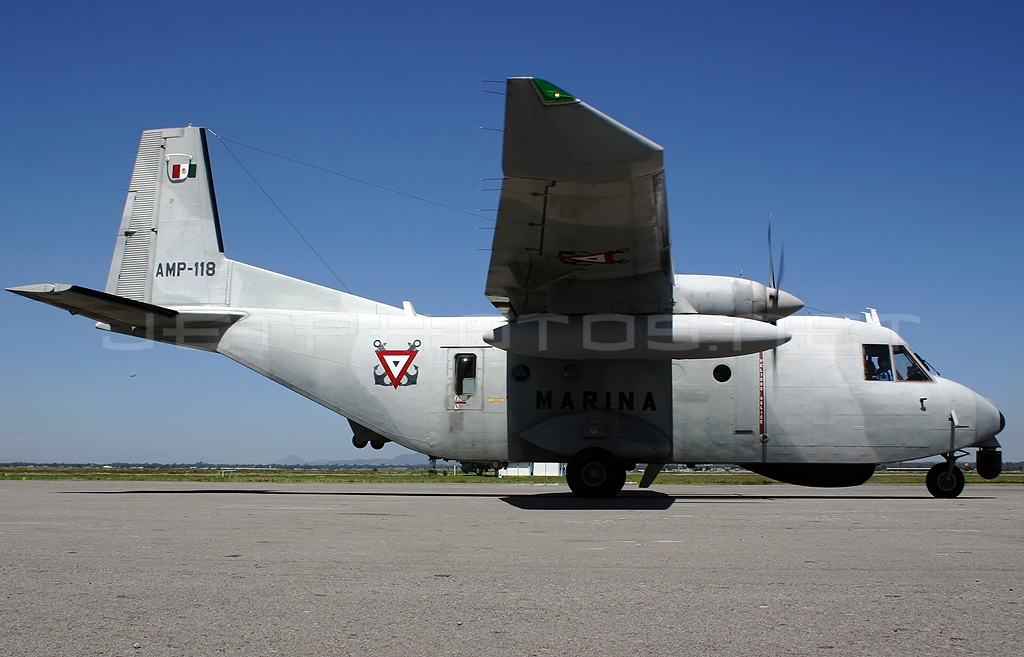
A Mexican Naval Air Force CASA C-212-400E Aviocar cargo plane in 2007

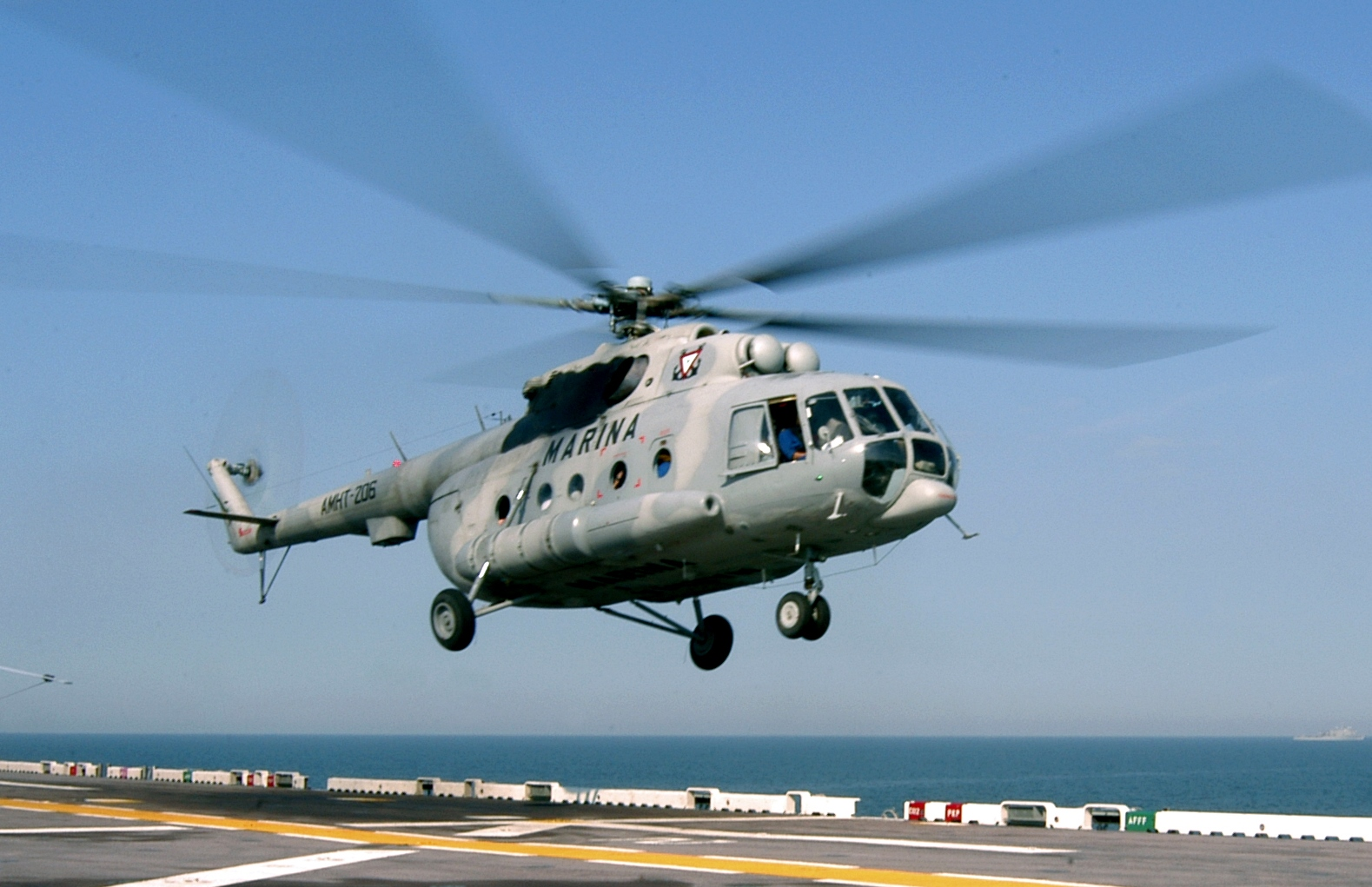
A Mexican Navy Mi-8 takes off from the flight deck of USS Bataan

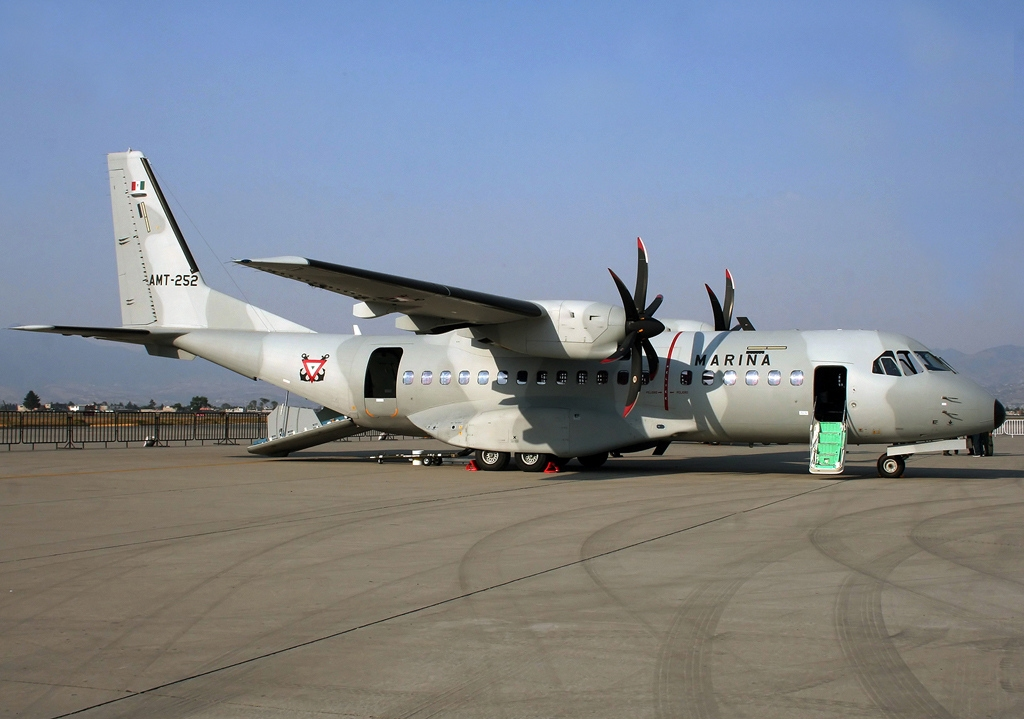
A CASA C-295M on the tarmac

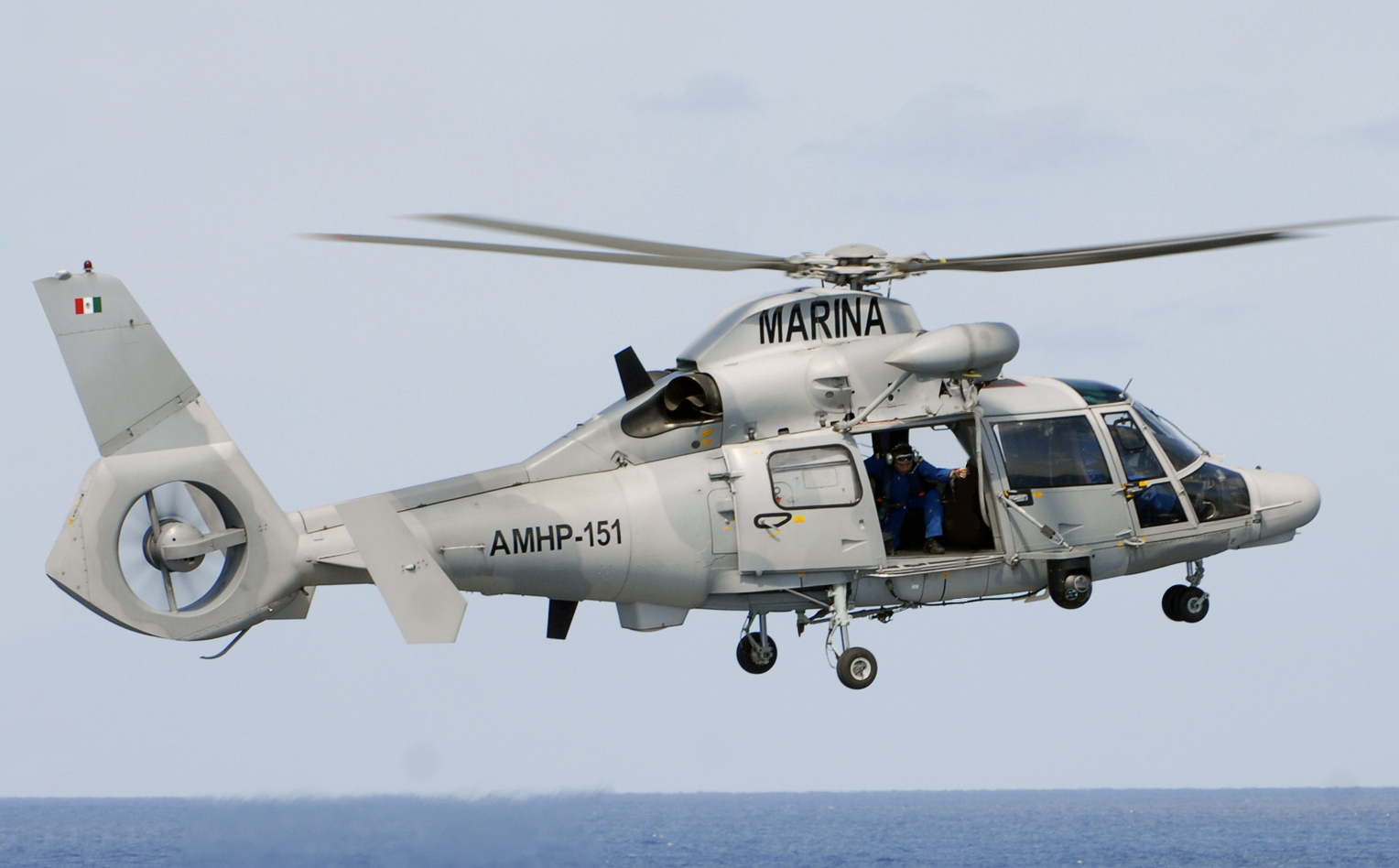
An AS565 Panther of the Mexican Navy

Aircraft	Origin	Type	Variant	In service
Maritime patrol
King Air	United States	surveillance	350	5
CASA C-212	Spain	maritime patrol		7
CASA CN-235	Spain / Indonesia	maritime patrol / SAR		6
Transport
Cessna 208	United States	utility / transport		2
Super King Air	United States	utility / transport	350	4
CASA CN-235	Spain / Indonesia	maritime patrol / SAR		6
Bombardier Dash 8	Canada	maritime patrol / SAR		2
Turbo Commander	United States	transport		4
Learjet 45	United States	utility / transport		2
Helicopters
Mil Mi-17	Russia	utility		22
MD Explorer	United States	utility		6
Sikorsky UH-60	United States	utility	UH-60M	9
Eurocopter EC725	France	SAR / transport		3
Eurocopter AS565	France	SAR / utility		14
Eurocopter AS555	France	utility		1
Trainer aircraft
Zlín Z 42	Czech Republic	trainer	242	26
Zlín Z 43	Czech Republic	trainer	143	2
T-6 Texan II	United States	trainer	T-6C+	13
Schweizer S333	United States	rotorcraft trainer		10
Unmanned aerial vehicle
SPARTAAM	Mexico	surveillance		3
SPARTAAM SANT-DAV	Mexico	surveillance / reconnaissance		Unkown quantity but ready for production.
SPARTAAM Quetzal	Mexico	surveillance / reconnaissance		Unkown quantity but in preparation for production.

== See also ==
- Mexican Armed Forces
- Mexican Department of Defense
- Mexican Army
- Mexican Air Force
- Mexican Department of the Navy
- Mexican Navy
- Mexican Naval Aviation
- Mexican National Guard
- List of airports in Mexico
- List of Mexican military installations
- List of airports in Mexico
- List of airports by ICAO code: M
