= Santa Gertrudis Air Force Base =

Mexican Air Force Base in Saucillo, Chihuahua, Mexico

Santa Gertrudis Air Force Base Base Aérea Militar No. 11 Santa Gertrudis
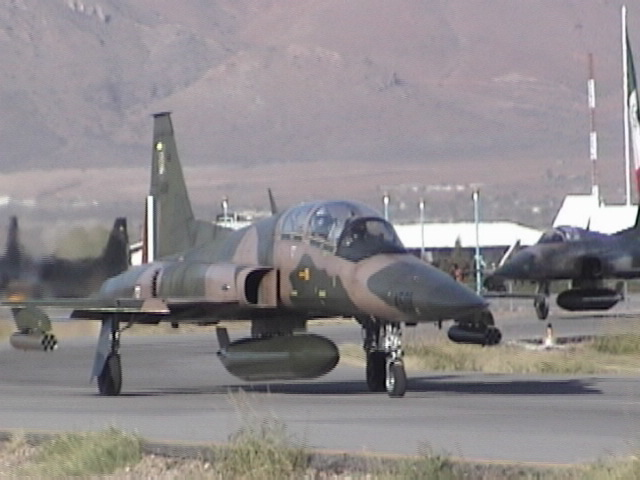
- IATA: none; ICAO: MMSG

Summary
- Airport type: Military
- Owner/Operator: Mexican Air Force
- Location: Saucillo, Chihuahua, Mexico
- Commander: General de Grupo Piloto Aviador Diplomado de Estado Mayor Aéreo Noé Cristóbal Ramírez Rodríguez
- Time zone: MST (UTC-07:00)
- Elevation AMSL: 1,420 m / 4,659 ft
- Coordinates: 27°47′11″N 105°42′00″W
- Website: www.gob.mx/sedena

Map
- Location of the Air Force Base in Chihuahua MMSG (Mexico)

Runways
Direction	Length		Surface
Direction	m	ft	Surface
06-24	2,651	8,698	Asphalt
- SEDENA

Santa Gertrudis Air Force Base (Spanish: Base Aérea Militar Santa Gertrudis) (B.A.M. 11); officially Base Aérea Militar No. 11 Teniente Coronel Juan Pablo Aldasoro Suárez (11th Air Force Base Lieutenant Colonel Juan Pablo Aldasoro Suárez) (ICAO: MMSG) is a military airport located in the municipality of Saucillo, Chihuahua, in Mexico. It belongs to the Northeast Region of the Mexican Air Force.

The airport is situated at an elevation of 1,420 metres (4,660 ft) above mean sea level and features a 2,651 metres (8,698 ft) long runway, an apron with several parking positions and helipads, and other facilities to accommodate Air Force personnel.

== Functions ==
The Air Force Military School for AeroTactical Applications (Spanish: Escuela Militar de Aplicación AeroTáctica de la Fuerza Aérea) (E.M.A.A.T.F.A. or EMAATFA) is permanently stationed at this air force base. Utilizing T-6C Texan II aircraft, the school focuses on training and updating the personnel and aviator pilot officers of the Mexican Air Force. The primary objective is to prepare them to function as auxiliaries or advisors within corporation-type organizations.

EMAATFA is responsible for instructing pilots in various operational aspects, including activities such as training, night flights, reconnaissance of the area, and air-to-ground firing practices involving machine guns, bombs, and rockets. Plans are underway to relocate EMAATFA to the Zapopan Air Force Base. Additionally, an air squadron based in Santa Gertrudis will be established to handle support activities in the region.

== Accidents and incidents ==
- On November 25, 1983, a Mexican Air Force aircraft, a Northrop F-5E Tiger II with registration 4002, crashed during a bombing and attack on land-targets training exercise at the Santa Gertrudis Air Base, killing its pilot and causing irreparable damage to the aircraft.

== See also ==
- List of airports in Mexico
- List of airports by ICAO code: M
- List of Mexican military installations
- Mexican Air Force
- Chihuahua International Airport
