= Pátzcuaro Airfield =

Airfield in Pátzcuaro, Michoacán, Mexico

Pátzcuaro Airfield Aeródromo de Pátzcuaro
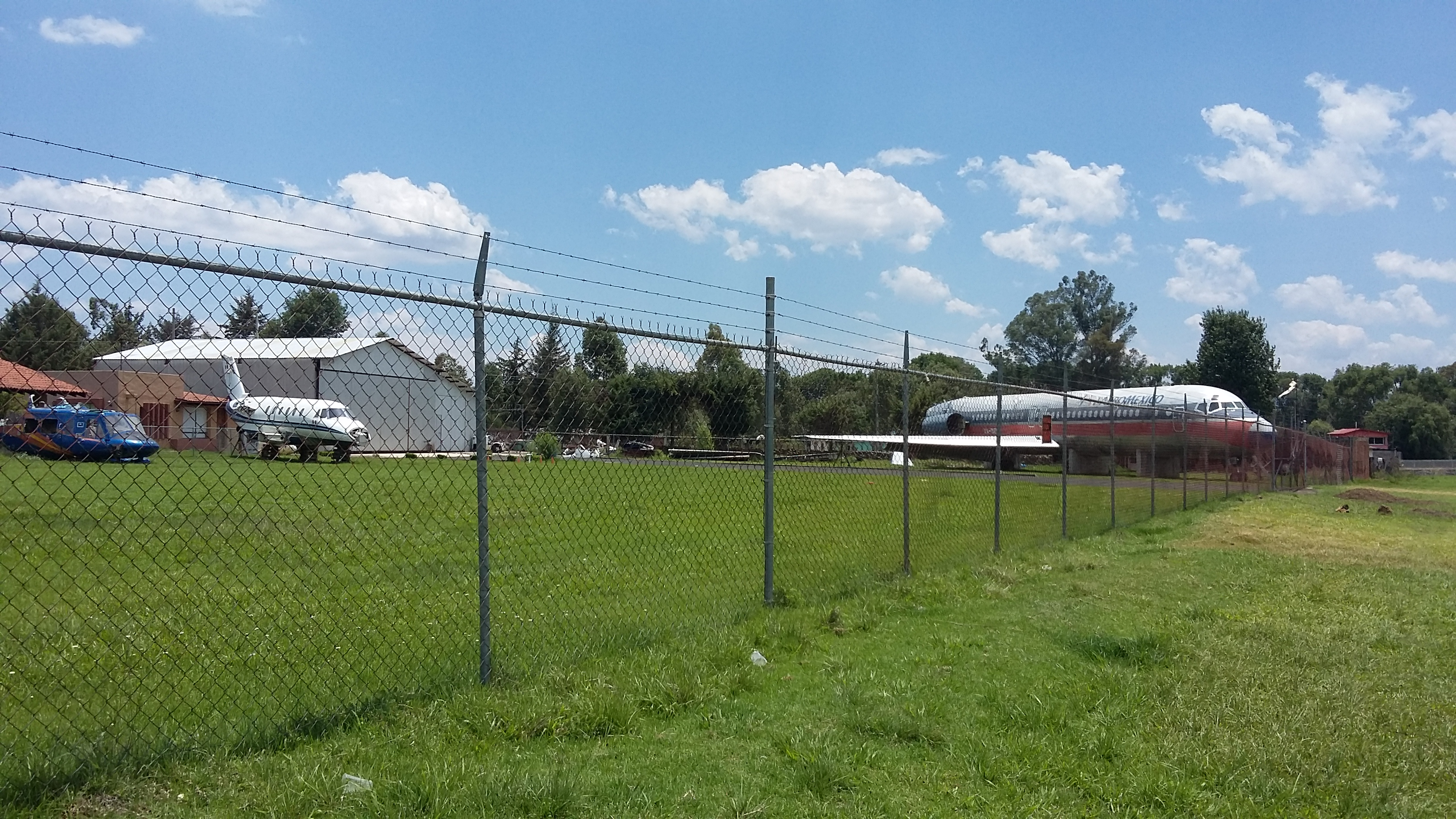
- IATA: none; ICAO: MX84; LID: PUR

Summary
- Airport type: Private
- Owner: Óscar Eslava
- Operator: Compañía Ecológica de Aviación S.A. de C.V.
- Serves: Pátzcuaro, Michoacán, Mexico
- Time zone: CST (UTC-06:00)
- Elevation AMSL: 2,055 m (6,742 ft)
- Coordinates: 19°32′53″N 101°34′43″W

Map
- Location of the airfield in Mexico PUR (Mexico)

Runways
Direction	Length		Surface
Direction	m	ft	Surface
12L/30R	1,250	4,101	Soil
12R/30L	370	1,214	Grass
- Source: Agencia Federal de Aviación Civil

Pátzcuaro Airfield, (Spanish: Aeródromo de Pátzcuaro), also known as Aeródromo Purépecha (Purépecha Airfield) (ICAO: MX84, AFAC: PUR), is a small airfield located in Tzurumútaro, Michoacán, Mexico. It handles the air traffic for Pátzcuaro, supporting flight training and general aviation activities. The airport does not offer scheduled passenger public flights. The closest airport providing commercial flights is Morelia International Airport.

This is the first airfield in Michoacán designed for Light-sport aircraft. The airfield remained inactive from 1987 until 2011. before that time, it was used by former President Lázaro Cárdenas del Río to visit Pátzcuaro. The modernization of the main runway is currently being considered, in order to be an alternative for Morelia Airport and Uruapan Airport, in addition to promoting tourism in the area of Lake Pátzcuaro. The radio frequency used for communications is 123,450.

== See also ==
- List of the busiest airports in Mexico
- List of airports in Mexico
- List of airports by ICAO code: M
- List of busiest airports in North America
- List of the busiest airports in Latin America
- Transportation in Mexico
- Tourism in Mexico
