= Salina Cruz Naval Air Base =

Mexican Naval Air Base in Salina Cruz, Oaxaca, Mexico

Salina Cruz Naval Air Base Estación Aeronaval de Salina Cruz
- IATA: ~~SCX~~; ICAO: ~~MMSZ~~

Summary
- Airport type: Military
- Owner/Operator: Mexican Navy
- Location: Salina Cruz, Oaxaca, Mexico
- Time zone: CST (UTC-06:00)
- Elevation AMSL: 23 m (75 ft)
- Coordinates: 16°12′45″N 095°12′05″W
- Website: www.gob.mx/semar

Map
- Location of the Naval Air Base in Oaxaca SCX (Mexico)

Runways
Direction	Length		Surface
Direction	m	ft	Surface
~~18/36~~	~~1,716~~	~~5,630~~	~~Asphalt~~
- Source: DAFIF

Salina Cruz Naval Air Base (Spanish: Estación Aeronaval de Salina Cruz), formerly known as Salina Cruz Airport ~~(IATA: SCX, ICAO: MMSZ)~~ is a Naval Air Base located in Salina Cruz, Oaxaca, Mexico. It previously served as Salina Cruz Airport, catering to commercial flights to Mexico City, primarily served by Aeromar, and supporting military and general aviation activities. However, the runway is no longer operational, and the base is currently utilized exclusively for helicopter operations. The nearest airport providing commercial flights is Ixtepec Airport.

The airport is situated at an elevation of 23 metres (75 ft) above mean sea level. It formerly had one runway, designated 18/36, with an asphalt surface measuring 1,716 by 21 metres (5,630 ft × 69 ft), along with an apron and a small passenger terminal.

== See also ==
- List of airports in Mexico
- List of airports by ICAO code: M
- List of Mexican military installations
- Mexican Navy
- Mexican Naval Aviation
- Ixtepec Airport
