= Ingeniero Juan Guillermo Villasana National Airport =

Airport in Pachuca, Hidalgo, Mexico

Pachuca National Airport Aeropuerto Nacional de Pachuca
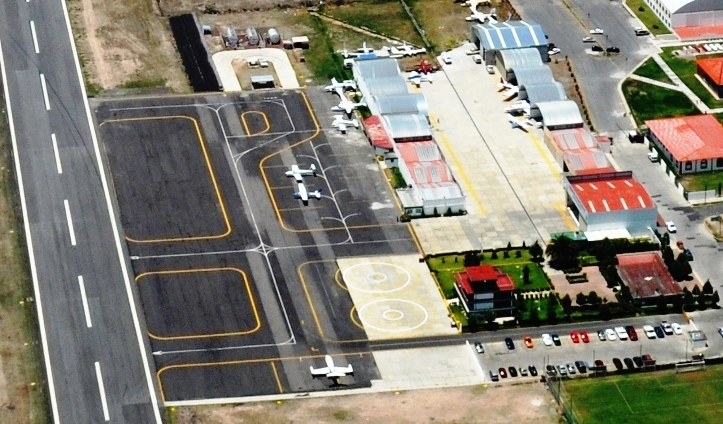
- IATA: none; ICAO: MMPC

Summary
- Airport type: Public
- Operator: Municipality of Pachuca
- Serves: Pachuca, Hidalgo, Mexico
- Time zone: CST (UTC−06:00)
- Elevation AMSL: 2,316 m / 7,598 ft
- Coordinates: 20°04′38″N 98°46′58″W

Map
- Location of airport in Hidalgo MMPC (Mexico)

Runways
Direction	Length		Surface
Direction	m	ft	Surface
03/21	2,200	7,218	Asphalt

Statistics (2023)
- Total Passengers: N/A
- Source: Aeropuertos y Servicios Auxiliares

Pachuca National Airport (Spanish: Aeropuerto Nacional de Pachuca); officially Aeropuerto Nacional Ingeniero Juan Guillermo Villasana (Juan Guillermo Villasana National Airport) (ICAO: MMPC) is a small airport located in Pachuca, Hidalgo, Mexico. It handles domestic air traffic and supports flight training, air taxi services, and general aviation activities. The airport does not provide scheduled passenger public services. The nearest airport that serves commercial flights is Mexico City's Felipe Ángeles International Airport. Operated by the municipality of Pachuca, it is named in honor of the engineer and aviator Juan Guillermo Villasana.

Pachuca Airport is situated at an elevation of 2,316 metres (7,598 ft) above mean sea level, covering an area of 36 hectares (89 acres). It features a single asphalt runway, designated as 03/21, measuring 2,200 by 25 metres (7,218 by 82 ft). The commercial aviation apron offers parking positions for small aircraft and general aviation. Adjacent facilities include civil aviation hangars, an apron with parking positions for aircraft, and a small terminal building.

Over time, the airport has experienced sporadic service from charter and regional airlines, providing flights within Mexico. However, its proximity to Mexico City has made it challenging to attract commercial services. Between 1998 and 2009, Click, the low-cost subsidiary of Mexicana de Aviación, served the Pachuca - Mérida route using a Fokker 100 aircraft.

== See also ==
- List of the busiest airports in Mexico
- List of airports in Mexico
- List of airports by ICAO code: M
- List of busiest airports in North America
- List of the busiest airports in Latin America
- Transportation in Mexico
- Tourism in Mexico
- Felipe Ángeles International Airport
- Mexico City International Airport
