= Engineer Manuel Moreno Torres National Airport =

Airport in Matehuala, San Luis Potosí, Mexico

Matehuala Airfield Aeropuerto de Matehuala
- IATA: none; ICAO: MM67; LID: MTH

Summary
- Airport type: Public
- Operator: Patronato de la Aeropista Municipal de Matehuala
- Serves: Matehuala, San Luis Potosí, Mexico
- Time zone: CST (UTC-06:00)
- Elevation AMSL: 1,550 m / 5,085 ft
- Coordinates: 23°40′38″N 100°37′21″W

Map

Runways
Direction	Length		Surface
Direction	m	ft	Surface
03/21	2,000	6,562	Asphalt

Statistics (2023)
- Total Passengers: N/A
- Source: Agencia Federal de Aviación Civil

Matehuala Airfield (Spanish: Aeropuerto de Matehuala), officially Aeropuerto Nacional Ingeniero Manuel Moreno Torres (Engineer Manuel Moreno Torres National Airport) (IATA: MTH, ICAO: MM67) is an airfield located in Matehuala, San Luis Potosí, Mexico. It handles domestic air traffic for the city of Matehuala, serving flight training and general aviation activities. It is operated by Patronato de la Aeropista Municipal de Matehuala. The airport does not provide scheduled passenger public services. The nearest airport serving commercial flights is San Luis Potosí International Airport.

The airport is situated at an elevation of 1,550 metres (5,090 ft) above mean sea level, located within the Matehuala urban area. It features a single asphalt runway, designated as 03/21, measuring 2,000 by 30 metres (6,562 by 98 ft). Adjacent facilities include a small apron and several hangars.

== See also ==
- List of the busiest airports in Mexico
- List of airports in Mexico
- List of airports by ICAO code: M
- List of busiest airports in North America
- List of the busiest airports in Latin America
- Transportation in Mexico
- Tourism in Mexico
- San Luis Potosí International Airport
