= Tuxpan Naval Air Base =

Tuxpan Naval Air Base Base Aeronaval de Tuxpán
- IATA: none; ICAO: MM31; LID: FVS

Summary
- Airport type: Military
- Operator: Secretariat of the Navy
- Serves: Tuxpan, Veracruz
- Location: Tuxpan Municipality
- Commander: Contralmirante José Hermilo Cuervo Salas
- Elevation AMSL: 9 ft / 3 m
- Coordinates: 20°56′43″N 097°22′35″W
- Website: https://www.gob.mx/semar/documentos/directorio-de-mandos-navales

Map
- Location of the airport in Veracruz FVS (Mexico)

Runways
Direction	Length		Surface
Direction	ft	m	Surface
07/25	4,430	1,350	Asphalt
- SEMAR

Fausto Vega Santander National Airport or Tuxpan Naval Air Base (ICAO: MM31, AFAC: FVS) is a military airport located in Tuxpan, Veracruz, Mexico.

== History and facilities ==
Tuxpan Airport was a stopover on Mexicana de Aviación's first commercial route (Mexico-Tuxpan-Tampico), which was also the first commercial aviation flight in all of North America, as it was on this route that the airline made its first commercial flight using Lincoln Standard L.S.5 "Tourabout" aircraft. Tuxpan Airport was also a stopover on the airline's first international flight, which departed from Mexico City to Brownsville, Texas, with stops in Tuxpan and Tampico respectively, using Ford Trimotor aircraft.

During the postwar period, the airfield was named after Fausto Vega Santander, a World War II belligerent pilot born in Tuxpan. It is currently the main operations center for the Gulf Wing of the Mexican Naval Aviation and has an unlit paved runway oriented 07/25, 1,360 meters long and 28 meters wide, as well as concrete turn ramps at both ends and a 13,500-square-meter apron with up to 20 spaces for small aircraft. The airport is exclusively for military use.
