= Veracruz International Airport =

International airport in Veracruz, Mexico

Veracruz International Airport Aeropuerto Internacional de Veracruz
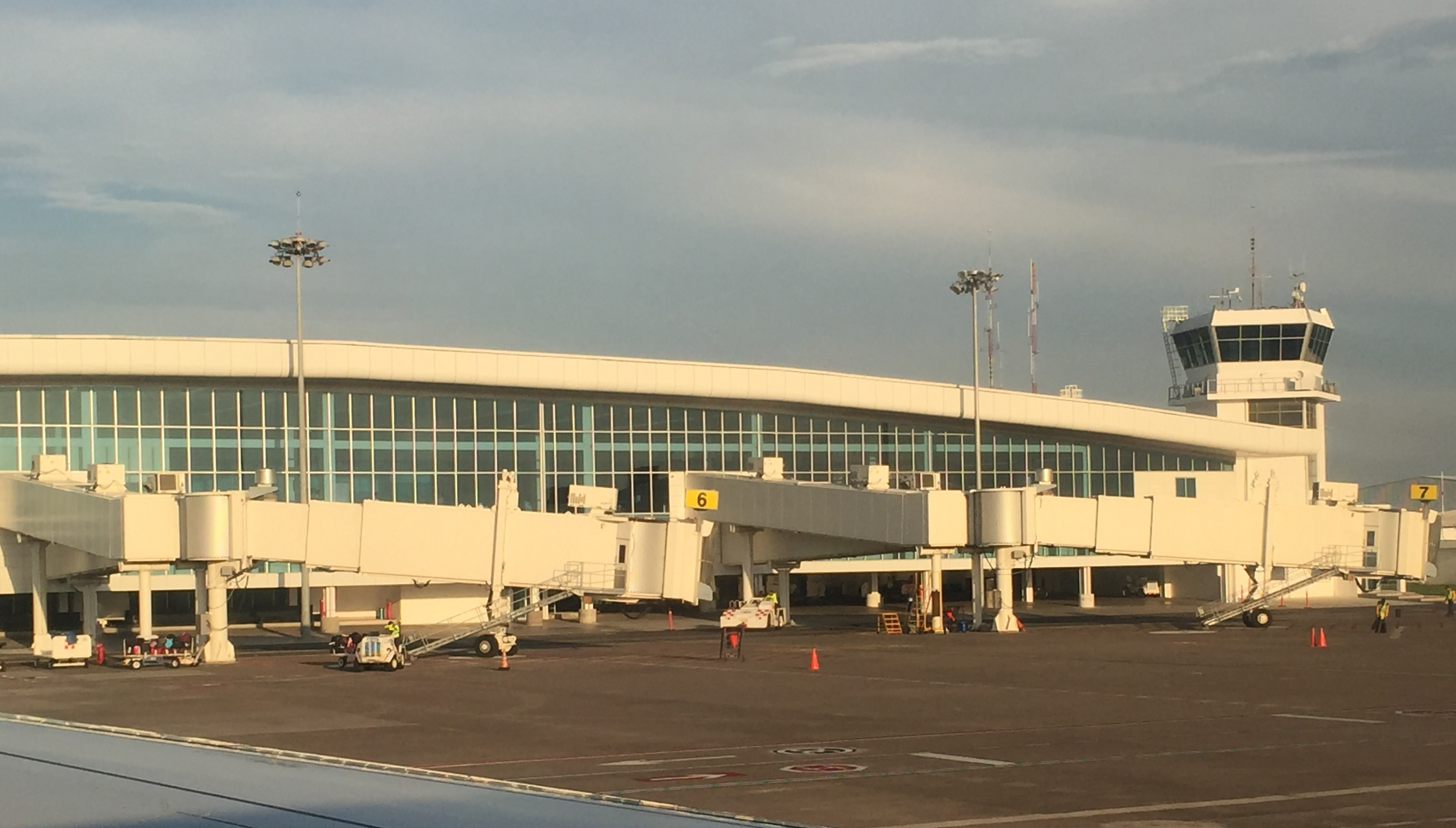
- IATA: VER; ICAO: MMVR

Summary
- Airport type: Military/Public
- Owner/Operator: Grupo Aeroportuario del Sureste
- Serves: Veracruz, Mexico
- Opened: 1942
- Time zone: CST (UTC-06:00)
- Elevation AMSL: 27 m (89 ft)
- Coordinates: 19°08′45″N 96°11′14″W
- Website: www.asur.com.mx/Contenido/Veracruz/shopping

Map
- Location of the airport in Veracruz VER (Mexico)

Runways
Direction	Length		Surface
Direction	m	ft	Surface
01/19	2,400	7,874	Asphalt
~~09/27~~ (closed)	~~1,523~~	~~5,000~~	~~Asphalt~~

Statistics (2025)
- Total passengers: 1,872,697
- Ranking in Mexico: 17th ▲1
- Source: Grupo Aeroportuario del Sureste

Veracruz International Airport (Spanish: Aeropuerto Internacional de Veracruz Heriberto Jara); officially Aeropuerto Internacional Heriberto Jara (General Heriberto Jara International Airport) (IATA: VER, ICAO: MMVR) is an international airport located in Veracruz, Mexico. It handles national and international air traffic for the Metropolitan Area of Veracruz and a significant portion of the State of Veracruz, including the metropolitan areas of Córdoba, Orizaba, and Xalapa. The airport is named in honor of General Heriberto Jara, a Constituent Deputy and former Governor of Veracruz. It is operated by the Grupo Aeroportuario del Sureste (ASUR).

The airport provides flight services to numerous cities within Mexico and to the United States. Additionally, it accommodates military facilities for the Mexican Navy and supports various tourism, flight training, and general aviation activities. According to ASUR's data, in 2024, it served 1,712,821 passengers, and in 2025, this number increased to 1,872,697 passengers. It ranked as the third-busiest airport in southern Mexico and the 17th-busiest in the country.

== History ==
Veracruz Airport was constructed in 1942 in an area known as "Las Bajadas." The construction was carried out by Compañía Mexicana de Aviación. However, the financial resources for this project were provided by the United States government through Pan American Airlines, with funding authorized by special allocations from the U.S. Congress. During World War II, the Naval Aviation School was established in 1943 at Las Bajadas, using aircraft that had previously belonged to the Mexican Air Force. Subsequent improvements were made in 1956, which included the construction of fuel storage facilities at the airport.

In 1964, on the brink of bankruptcy, Mexicana de Aviación sold the airport to the Mexican government. Between 1965 and 1970, the airport was completely reconstructed on the site of the previous one. Adjacent lands were acquired to meet the requirements of a new airport project, which included runways, taxiways, commercial and general aviation platforms, a control tower, a passenger terminal, parking lots, an access road, a machinery room, and a fuel station. Additionally, air conditioning equipment, high-intensity lights, and visual aids were installed. For the pavement of both runways, a mixed-type experiment was conducted, using hydraulic concrete in the longitudinal center section and flexible pavement in the immediate lateral areas. In 1974 the Naval Air Station of Veracruz was established, taking over the old airport facilities.

During the 1990s, the airport became a part of Grupo Aeroportuario del Sureste, which marked the first instance of a concession to private initiative within this group. This consortium includes airports in Cancún, Cozumel, Huatulco, Mérida, Minatitlán, Oaxaca, Tapachula, Villahermosa, and Veracruz. In 1999 the Mexican Navy started a program to build kit planes and light helicopters at the Naval Air Base. Between 2014 and 2016 the passenger terminal underwent a complete modernization and expansion. Gates in Concourse A were equipped with jetbridges and Concourse B was built to accommodate more passengers.

== Facilities ==
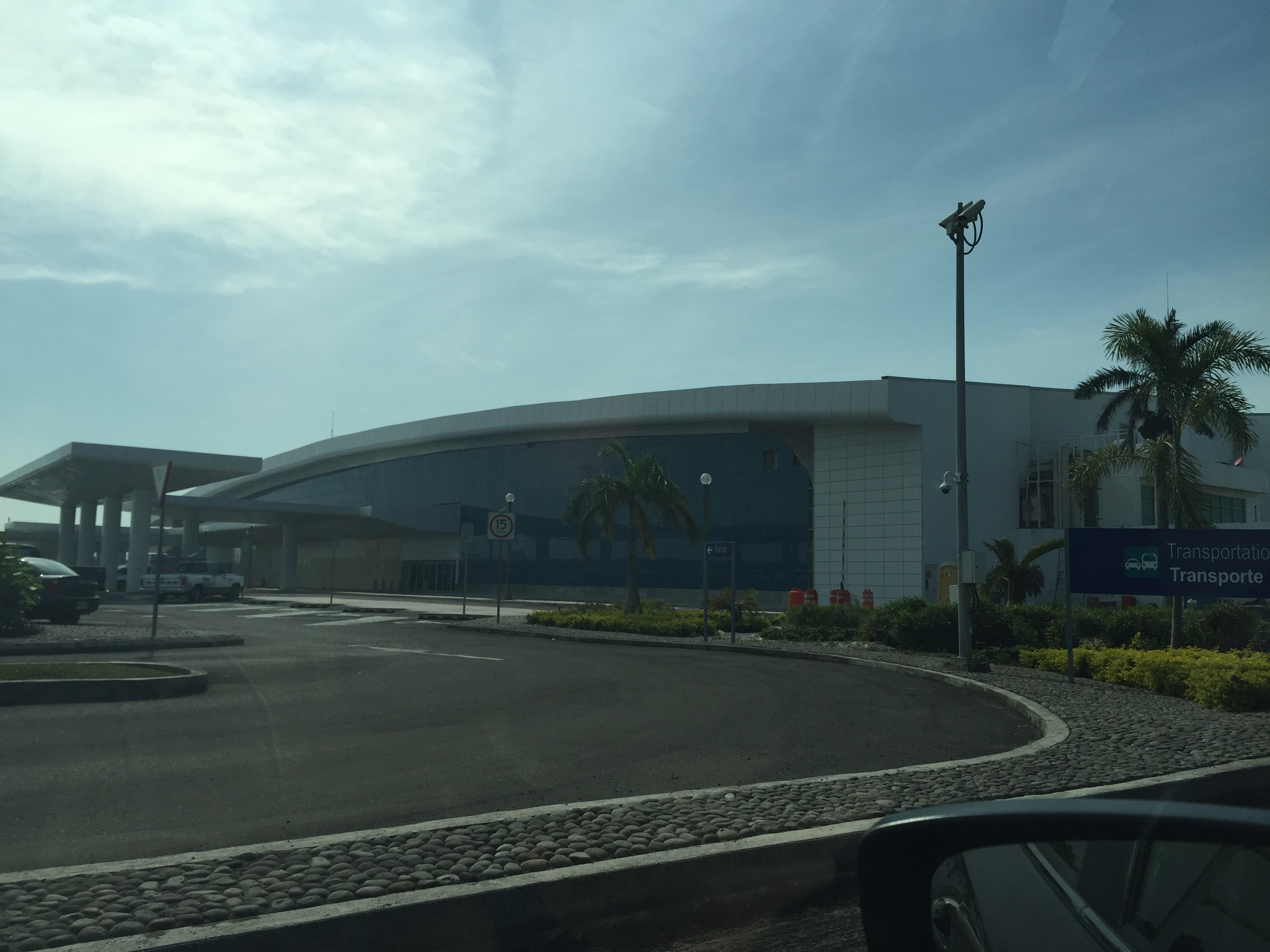
Passenger terminal

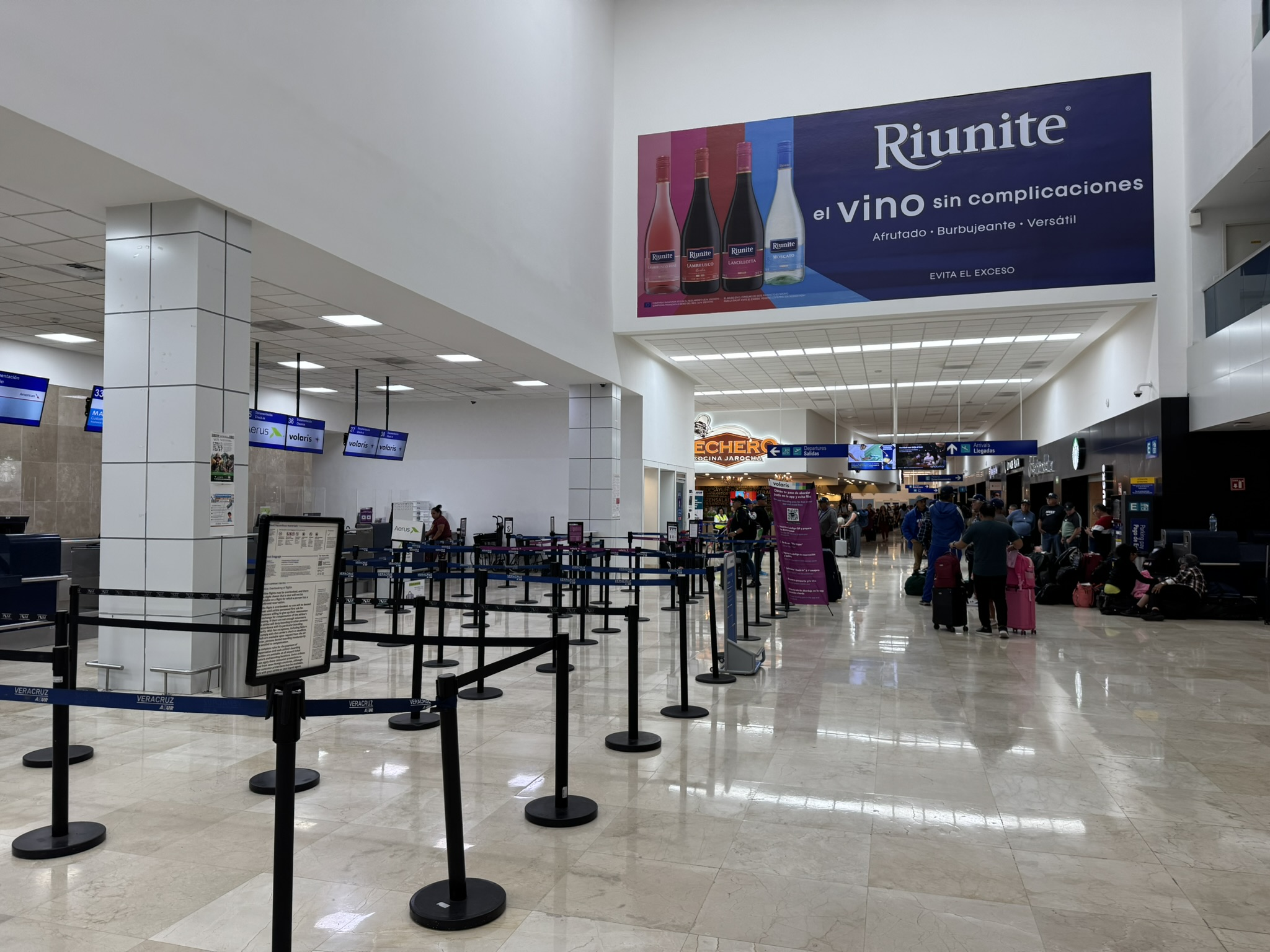
Check-in area

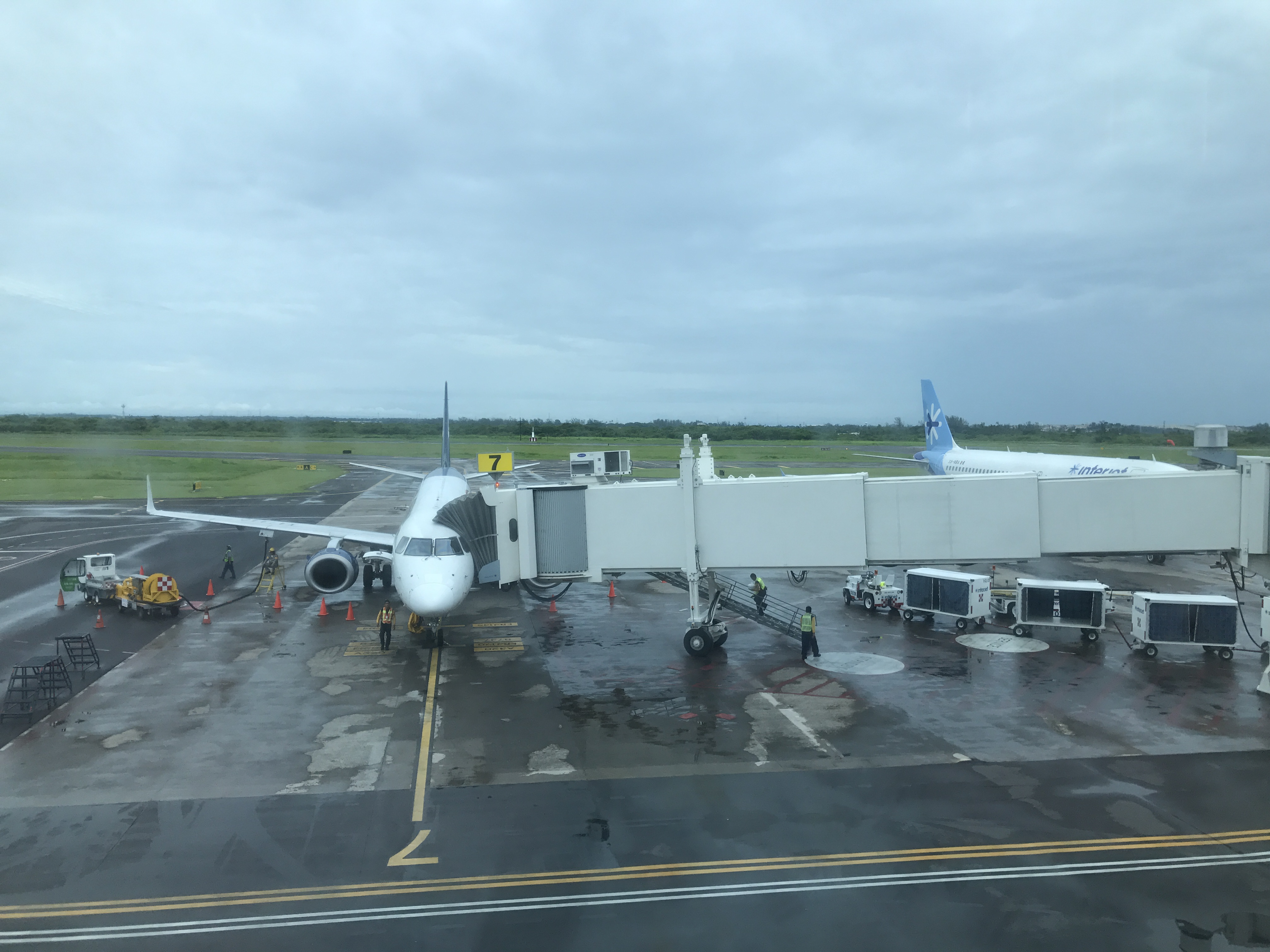
Platform of the airport

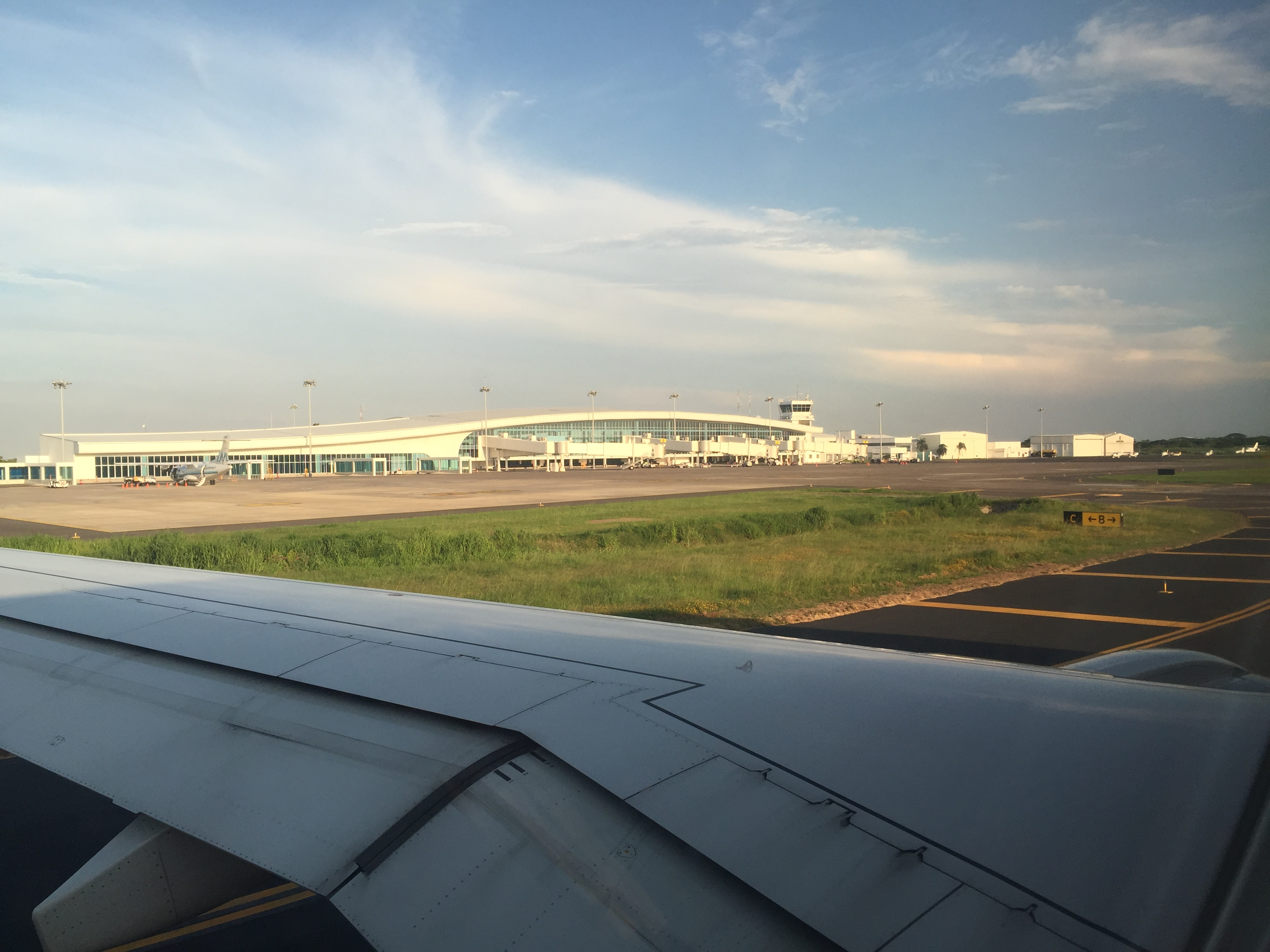
Passenger terminal airside

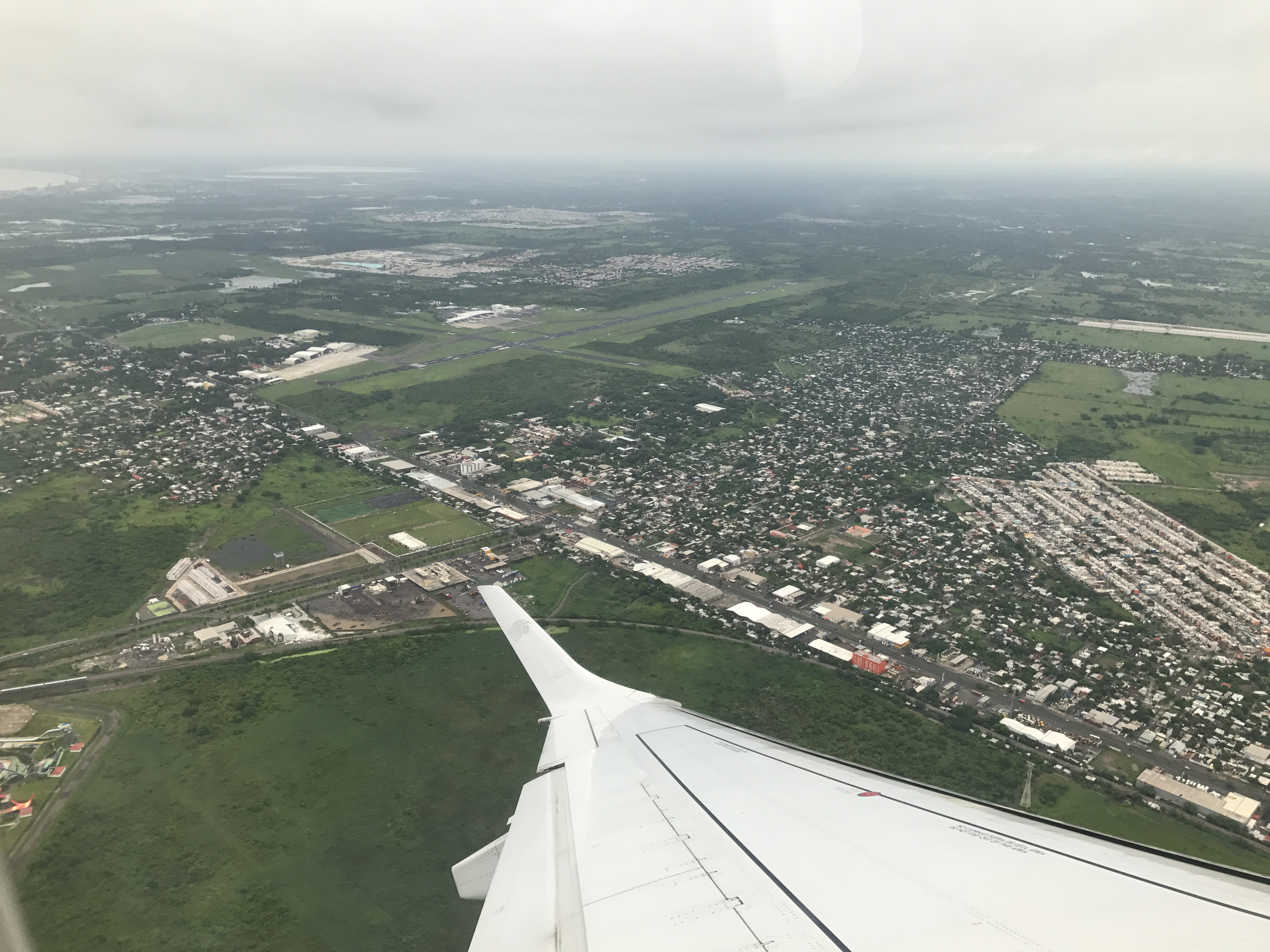
Aerial view of VER

The airport is located on the outskirts of the city of Veracruz. It has an elevation of 14 metres (46 ft) above sea level and features a single runway designated as 01/19, measuring 2,400 metres (7,900 ft) in length with an asphalt surface. A former runway, designated as Runway 09/27, is no longer in operation. The commercial aviation apron provides nine stands mainly designed for narrow-body aircraft. The general aviation apron offers parking for fixed-wing aircraft and heliports for private aviation. The airport has the capacity to handle up to 20 operations per hour.

The passenger terminal is a two-story building. The ground floor houses the main entrance, a check-in area, and the arrivals section, which includes customs and immigration facilities along with four baggage claim carousels. Additionally, it offers car rental services, taxi stands, snack bars, and souvenir shops. The upper floor of the terminal contains the security checkpoint and departure area equipped with a food court, a duty-free shop, a VIP lounge, and Concourse A, featuring four gates equipped with jet bridges. This concourse is primarily utilized by Aeromexico, Viva, and United Airlines. Concourse B (Gates B1-8) is situated on the ground floor's northern end of the terminal and is primarily used by Aerus, TAR, Viva Aerobus, and Volaris.

Adjacent to the terminal, other facilities include civil aviation hangars, cargo and logistics and courier companies, and designated spaces for general aviation. The terminal does not have public transportation service to the city of Veracruz; however, it does offer ADO bus services to nearby cities like Xalapa. The parking facility provides both short-term and long-term parking spaces.

Veracruz Airport hosts the following facilities:

- Number of gates: 11
- Contact positions: 11
- Number of jetways: 4
- Number of baggage-claiming carousels: 6 (4 domestic, 2 international)
- Customs (Arrivals area)
- Taxi & car rentals (Arrivals area)
- Duty-Free
- Caral VIP Lounge
- Parking area

Veracruz Airport also accommodates the Las Bajadas Naval Air Base, also known as the Naval Air Base of Veracruz (Spanish: Base Aeronaval de Veracruz) (BASANVER). It is the largest and oldest Naval Air Base in Mexico. This base includes hangars, aircraft stands, and military facilities owned by the Mexican Navy. It controls operations on the Gulf Coast of Mexico. These facilities are also home to a Flight Crew Training Center.

Las Bajadas Air Base hosts the following units:

- 1st Maritime Patrol Naval Air Squad – operating CASA C-212PM
- 1st Early Warning and Reconnaissance Naval Air Squad – operating E-2C Hawkeye 2000
- Naval Aviation School – operating MD 500, Robinson R22, Schweizer 300, Zlín Z 42

== Airlines and destinations ==
=== Passenger ===
Airlines	Destinations
Aeroméxico	Mexico City–Benito Juárez
Aeroméxico Connect	Mexico City–Benito Juárez, Mexico City–Felipe Ángeles
Aerus	Tampico, Villahermosa
American Eagle	Dallas/Fort Worth
United Airlines	Houston–Intercontinental
Viva	Cancún, Guadalajara, Mérida, Mexico City–Benito Juárez, Mexico City–Felipe Ángeles, Monterrey, Reynosa, Tijuana
Volaris	Guadalajara, Querétaro, Tijuana

=== Destinations map ===
Domestic destinations from Veracruz International Airport
Red = Year-round destination
Blue = Future destination
Green = Seasonal destination
International destinations from Veracruz International Airport
Red = Year-round destination
Blue = Future destination
Green = Seasonal destination

== Statistics ==
=== Annual Traffic ===
Passenger statistics at VER
Year	Total Passengers	change %
2000	494,068	Steady
2001	503,432	▲1.89%
2002	479,574	▼4.73%
2003	514,630	▲7.30%
2004	563,468	▲9.48%
2005	579,449	▲2.83%
2006	717,960	▲23.90%
2007	976,606	▲36.02%
2008	981,083	▲0.45%
2009	852,608	▼13.09%
2010	834,199	▼2.15%
2011	867,438	▲3.98%
2012	894,552	▲3.12%
2013	1,010,814	▲12.99%
2014	1,157,522	▲14.51%
2015	1,249,914	▲7.98%
2016	1,315,867	▲5.27%
2017	1,367,972	▲4.00%
2018	1,488,569	▲8.82%
2019	1,475,581	▼0.9%
2020	721,159	▼51.1%
2021	1,103,460	▲53.0%
2022	1,333,578	▲20.9%
2023	1,665,694	▲24.9%
2024	1,712,821	▲2.8%
2025	1,872,697	▲9.3%

=== Busiest routes ===
Busiest routes from VER (Jan–Dec 2025)
Rank	City	Passengers
1	Mexico City, Mexico City	295,836
2	Guadalajara, Jalisco	151,759
3	Monterrey, Nuevo León	128,445
4	Cancún, Quintana Roo	124,352
5	Tijuana, Baja California	57,744
6	Mérida, Yucatán	56,452
7	Houston–Intercontinental, United States	33,338
8	Mexico City/AIFA, State of Mexico	26,446
9	Reynosa, Tamaulipas	23,528
10	Dallas/Fort Worth, United States	20,547

== Accidents and incidents ==
On 2 April 1981, Douglas C-47A N258M of Sky Train Air was written off in an accident while taxiing.

== See also ==
- List of the busiest airports in Mexico
- List of airports in Mexico
- List of airports by ICAO code: M
- List of busiest airports in North America
- List of the busiest airports in Latin America
- Transportation in Mexico
- Tourism in Mexico
- List of beaches in Mexico
- Grupo Aeroportuario del Sureste
- Mexican Naval Aviation
- Tlacotalpan
