= Ciudad Pemex Air Force Base =

Ciudad Pemex Air Force Base Base Aérea Militar N° 16 de Ciudad Pemex
- IATA: none; ICAO: MM48; LID: CPX

Summary
- Airport type: Military
- Operator: Secretariat of National Defense
- Serves: Ciudad Pemex, Tabasco
- Location: Macuspana Municipality
- Commander: General de Ala Piloto Aviador de Estado Mayor Luis Uriel Guerrero Olvera
- Elevation AMSL: 33 ft / 10 m
- Coordinates: 17°52′50″N 092°28′30″W
- Website: https://www.gob.mx/defensa/acciones-y-programas/bases-aereas

Map
- Location of the airport in Tabasco CPX (Mexico)

Runways
Direction	Length		Surface
Direction	ft	m	Surface
05/23	5,413	1,650	Asphalt
- SEDENA

Ciudad Pemex Air Force Base (ICAO: MM48, AFAC: CPX) is a military airport located in Ciudad Pemex, Macuspana, Tabasco, Mexico. It is located southeast of Ciudad Pemex and has one unlit runway, oriented 05/23, measuring 1,650 meters long and 30 meters wide, with turn ramps at both ends, it has also a 10,000-square-meter apron and a hangar.

The Ciudad Pemex Air Base began operating as such on December 1, 1995, the date on which Tenosique Airfield ceased to function as an air base and became Military Air Station No. 10. It is currently staffed by a general, a chief, 16 officers, and 70 troops responsible for providing flight equipment, air traffic control, aviation weapons, meteorology, and aerology. BAM-16 is the permanent headquarters of the 109th Air Squadron, which operates Cessna 182 aircraft.

== Accidents and incidents ==
- On October 21, 1974, a Sud Aviation SE 316B Alouette III aircraft registered XC-TAM, operated by Petróleos Mexicanos and destined for the Pozo Unión platform, crashed while taking off from the base, killing its pilot, its mechanic and 5 Pemex officials.
