= Lázaro Cárdenas Airport =

Airport in Lázaro Cárdenas, Michoacán, Mexico

Lázaro Cárdenas del Río National Airport Aeropuerto Nacional de Lázaro Cárdenas del Río
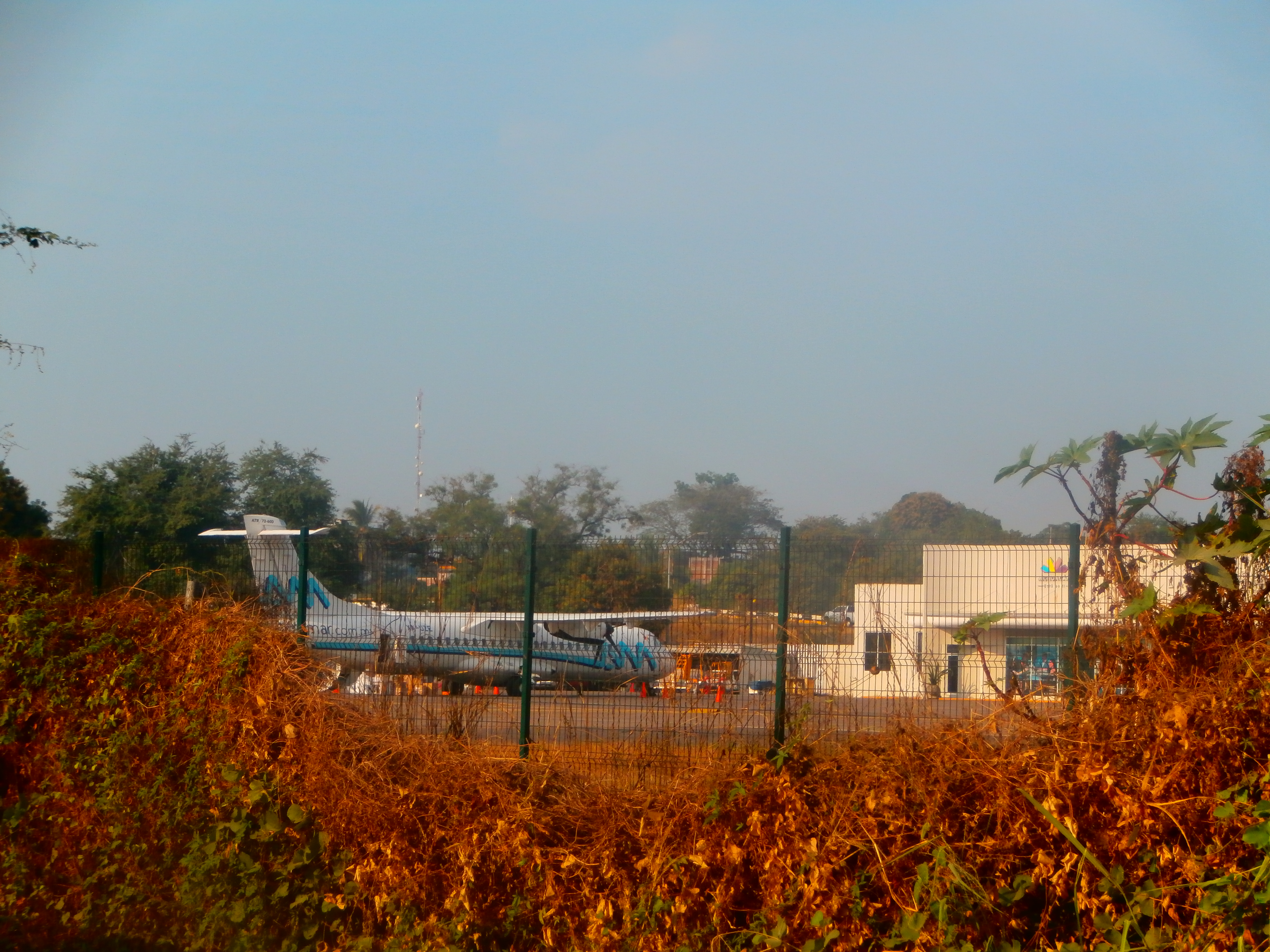
- IATA: LZC; ICAO: MMLC; LID: LZC

Summary
- Airport type: Public
- Operator: Administración del Sistema Portuario Nacional (ASIPONA) Lázaro Cárdenas S.A. de C.V.
- Serves: Lázaro Cárdenas, Michoacán, Mexico
- Time zone: CST (UTC-06:00)
- Elevation AMSL: 12 m / 39 ft
- Coordinates: 18°00′06″N 102°13′13″W

Map
- Location of airport in Michoacán LZC (Mexico)

Runways
Direction	Length		Surface
Direction	m	ft	Surface
01/19	1,494	4,902	Asphalt

Statistics (2021)
- Total passengers: 1,945
- Ranking in Mexico: 55th
- Source: Agencia Federal de Aviación Civil

Lázaro Cárdenas del Río National Airport (Spanish: Aeropuerto Nacional de Lázaro Cárdenas); officially Aeropuerto Nacional Gral. Lázaro Cárdenas del Río (General Lázaro Cárdenas del Río National Airport) (Spanish: [ˈlasaɾo ˈkaɾdenas]) (IATA: LZC, ICAO: MMLC) is an airport located in Lázaro Cárdenas, Michoacán, Mexico. It serves national air traffic for the city of Lázaro Cárdenas, offering flight training, executive, and general aviation activities. Operated by the state-owned Administración del Sistema Portuario Nacional (ASIPONA), it is named in honor of Mexican president Lázaro Cárdenas. It handled 5,447 passengers in 2020 and 1,945 passengers in 2021.

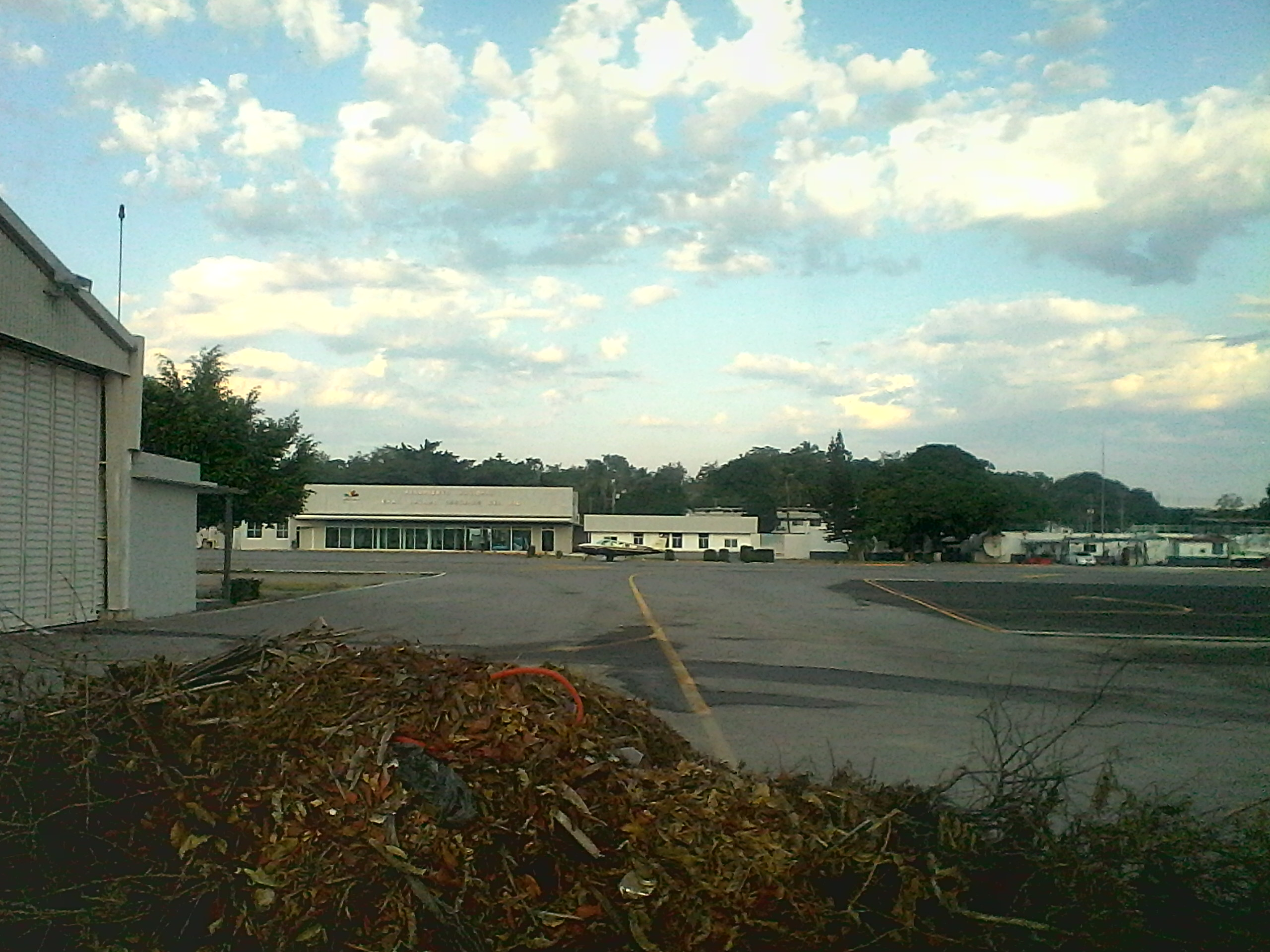
Passenger terminal airside

Over the years, it has experienced intermittent service by regional airlines, offering domestic flights. Until 2021, Aeromar operated daily flights to Mexico City. The airport does not provide scheduled passenger public services. The closest airport that serves commercial flights is Ixtapa-Zihuatanejo International Airport.

== Facilities ==
The airport is situated at an elevation of 12 metres (39 ft) above mean sea level. It features a single asphalt runway, designated as 08/26, measuring 1,500 by 28 metres (4,921 by 92 ft). Adjacent facilities include a small passenger terminal, several hangars, and an apron with helipads and parking positions for small aircraft. The airport also accommodates the Lázaro Cárdenas Naval Air Base (Spanish: Base Aeronaval de Lázaro Cárdenas).

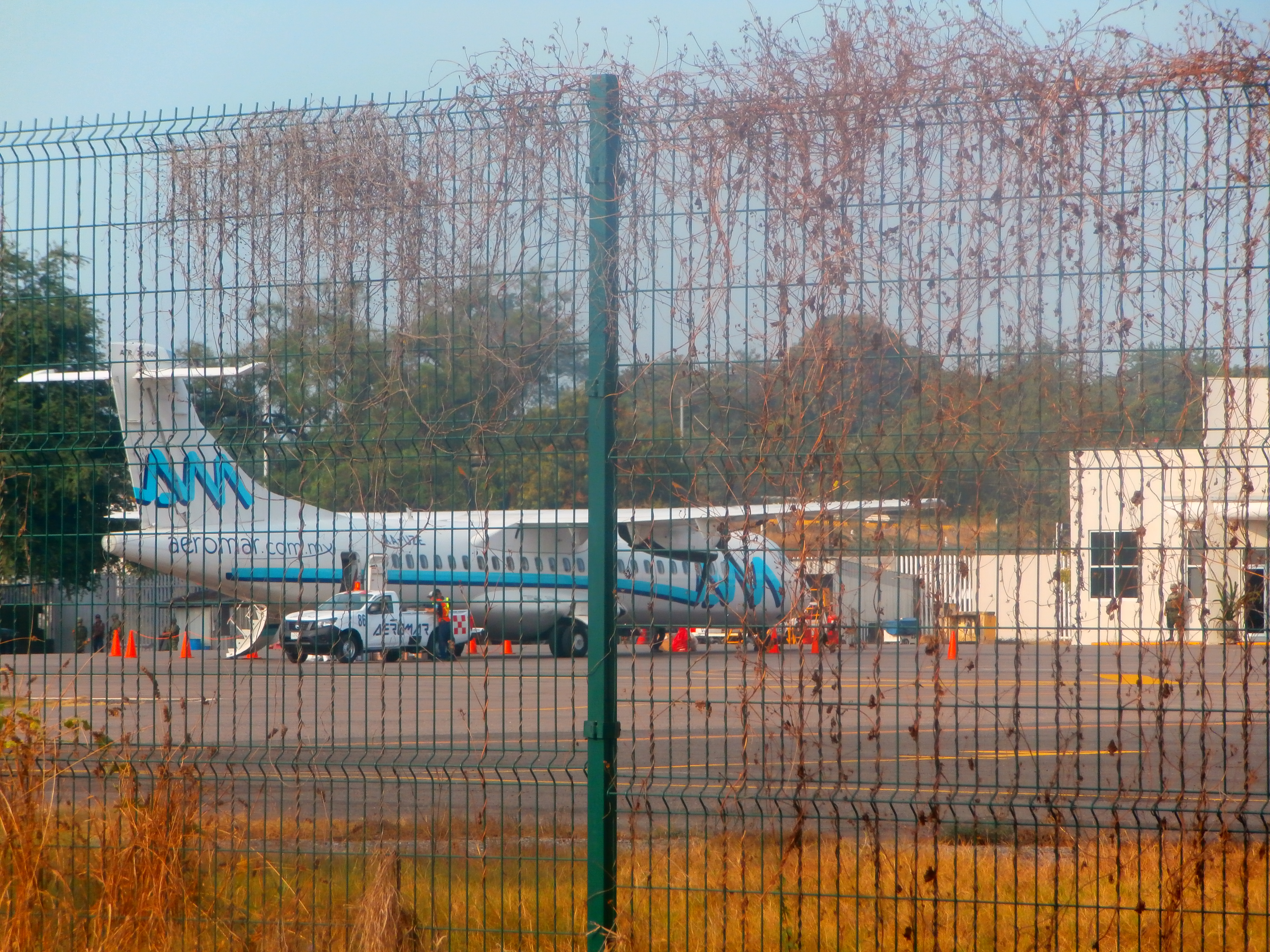
Aeromar ATR-72-600 XA-UZE at LZC

== See also ==
- List of airports in Mexico
- List of the busiest airports in Mexico
- List of busiest airports in North America
- List of the busiest airports in Latin America
- Naval air bases
- List of airports by ICAO code: M
- Airline destinations
- Transportation in Mexico
- Tourism in Mexico
- Ixtapa-Zihuatanejo International Airport
