= Comitan/Copalar Air Force Base =

Comitan-Copalar Air Force Base Base Aérea Militar N.º 17 "General de División Piloto Aviador Luis Farell Cubillas"
- IATA: CJT; ICAO: MMCO; LID: COP

Summary
- Airport type: Public
- Owner/Operator: SEDENA
- Serves: Comitán de Domínguez
- Location: Comitán Municipality
- Commander: General de Grupo Piloto Aviador Sergio Montaño Méndez
- Elevation AMSL: 3,806 ft / 1,160 m
- Coordinates: 16°10′30″N 092°02′54″W
- Website: www.sedena.gob/bases-aereas

Map
- Location of the airport in Chiapas CJT (Mexico)

Runways
| Direction | Length | | Surface |
| Direction | ft | m | Surface |
|---|---|---|---|
| 09/27 | 5,905 | 1,800 | Asphalt |
| ~~06/24~~ (closed) | ~~2,625~~ | ~~800~~ | ~~Asphalt~~ |
- SEDENA

Copalar 17th Air Force Base (IATA: CJT, ICAO: MMCO, AFAC: COP) formerly known as Comitan National Airport is a military airport located to the south of San Antonio Copalar and 7 miles southeast from Comitán de Domínguez, Chiapas, Mexico. It was formerly the civil airport for the city of Comitán, but was closed to civil aviation due to low user demand, with its last commercial flight in August 2003.

It is built on a 4.91 square kilometer site which is shared with 39th Military Zone and the 91st Infantry Battalion. It has a main runway measuring 1,800 meters long and 30 meters wide with turn drops at both ends. It also has a main aviation apron measuring 7,644 square meters, a secondary aviation apron measuring 7,056 square meters, and a tertiary aviation apron measuring 4,950 square meters. It used to have a second runway measuring 800 meters long and 23 meters wide, which currently functions as a taxiway connecting the runway to the second and third aviation aprons.

== Statistics ==
Comitan National Airport operated only commercial flights between February 2000 and August 2003, and subsequently operated only charter flights. The following table does not show general aviation or military flights.

Statistical Evolution Comitan National Airport 2000-2005
| Year | Flights | Passengers | Cargo (kg) |
| 2000 | 648 | 12,349 | 21,481 |
| 2001 | 852 | 10,301 | 35,050 |
| 2002 | 1,349 | 8,308 | 48,866 |
| 2003 | 779 | 3961 | 36,421 |
| 2004 | 4 | 154 | 0 |
| 2005 | 2 | 81 | 0 |
