= La Pesca Naval Air Base =

La Pesca Naval Air Base Base Aeronaval de La Pesca
- IATA: none; ICAO: MM22; LID: LPE

Summary
- Airport type: Military
- Operator: Secretariat of the Navy
- Serves: La Pesca
- Location: Soto la Marina Municipality
- Commander: Contralmirante Álvaro Alejandro Alfaro Flores
- Elevation AMSL: 16 ft / 5 m
- Coordinates: 23°47′39″N 097°46′20″W
- Website: https://www.gob.mx/semar/documentos/directorio-de-mandos-navales

Map
- Location of the airport in Tamaulipas LPE (Mexico)

Runways
Direction	Length		Surface
Direction	ft	m	Surface
16/34	6,795	2,071	Asphalt
- SEMAR; PilotNav

La Pesca Naval Air Base (ICAO: MM22, AFAC: LPE) is a military airfield operated by the Mexican Navy located in the town of La Pesca in the municipality of Soto la Marina, Tamaulipas.

== Facilities ==
The airport has a 2,071 meters-length and 24 meters-width runway, it has an aviation platform of 9,000 square meters and radio communication facilities through its control tower, which allows the operation of medium and small aircraft, however, this airfield does not have any service for civil aircraft.

== Relocation plans ==
In 2010, the Secretariat of Public Works and Urban Development of the Government of Tamaulipas proposed the creation of a new commercial airport approximately 10 miles northwest of the current naval air base and 3 km south of the community of Benito Juárez in the municipality of Soto la Marina. The airport would be built on a 434-hectare site and would have a 2,500-meter-long and 45-meter-wide runway, a 10,489-square-meter commercial aviation apron, and a 4,833-square-meter general aviation apron. It would also have a terminal building, a control tower, a building for a rescue and firefighting unit, parking, fuel storage and distribution facilities, and a wastewater treatment plant. The runway would have PAPI lights at runways 16 and 34, a VHF/DME omnidirectional radio beacon, and illuminated wind cones at both runways.

By 2011, the new airport project had been canceled, along with the Costa Lora project, due to a lack of funding. However, in 2014, Aeropuertos y Servicios Auxiliares proposed rehabilitating and modernizing La Pesca Air Base.
