= La Pesca =

Town in Tamaulipas, Mexico

Coordinates: 23°46′N 97°47′W

La Pesca, Tamaulipas, Mexico.

La Pesca is a small town in the Mexican state of Tamaulipas. It is located on the Gulf of Mexico, at the mouth of the Río Soto La Marina, between the Laguna Madre to the north and the Laguna Morales to the south. It stands due east of state capital Ciudad Victoria, in the municipality of Soto la Marina.

The local economy is mainly based on fishing, tourism, and maritime recreational activities. La Pesca is also frequently used as a reference point ("breakpoint") in government-issued weather advisories.

As of 2020, the location had a population of 1,742 people.
