= List of Viva destinations =

Viva serves the following destinations, as of June 2026:

== List ==
Country (State/Region)	City	Airport	Notes	Refs
Colombia	Bogotá	El Dorado International Airport		
Colombia	Cartagena	Rafael Núñez International Airport		
Colombia	Medellín	José María Córdova International Airport		
Costa Rica	San José	Juan Santamaría International Airport		
Cuba	Camagüey	Ignacio Agramonte International Airport		
Cuba	Havana	José Martí International Airport		
Cuba	Holguín	Frank País Airport		
Cuba	Santiago de Cuba	Antonio Maceo Airport		
Cuba	Santa Clara	Abel Santamaría Airport		
Ecuador	Quito	Mariscal Sucre International Airport	Terminated	
Mexico (Aguascalientes)	Aguascalientes	Aguascalientes International Airport	Resumes June 15, 2026	
Mexico (Baja California)	Mexicali	Mexicali International Airport		
Mexico (Baja California)	Tijuana	Tijuana International Airport		
Mexico (Baja California Sur)	La Paz	La Paz International Airport		
Mexico (Campeche)	Campeche	Campeche International Airport	Terminated	
Mexico (Campeche)	Ciudad del Carmen	Ciudad del Carmen International Airport	Terminated	
Mexico (Chiapas)	Tuxtla Gutiérrez	Tuxtla Gutiérrez International Airport		
Mexico (Chiapas)	Tapachula	Tapachula International Airport		
Mexico (Chihuahua)	Chihuahua	Chihuahua International Airport		
Mexico (Chihuahua)	Ciudad Juárez	Ciudad Juárez International Airport		
Mexico (Coahuila)	Saltillo	Saltillo Airport		
Mexico (Coahuila)	Torreón	Torreón International Airport		
Mexico (Colima)	Manzanillo	Playa de Oro International Airport	Begins July 2, 2026	
Mexico (Durango)	Durango	Durango International Airport		
Mexico (Guanajuato)	León/El Bajío	Bajío International Airport		
Mexico (Guerrero)	Acapulco	Acapulco International Airport		
Mexico (Guerrero)	Ixtapa/Zihuatanejo	Ixtapa-Zihuatanejo International Airport		
Mexico (Jalisco)	Guadalajara	Guadalajara International Airport	Hub	
Mexico (Jalisco)	Puerto Vallarta	Licenciado Gustavo Díaz Ordaz International Airport		
Mexico (Mexico City)	Mexico City	Mexico City International Airport	Hub	
Mexico (Mexico City)	Mexico City	Felipe Ángeles International Airport	Hub	
Mexico (Michoacán)	Morelia	General Francisco Mujica International Airport		
Mexico (Nayarit)	Tepic	Tepic International Airport		
Mexico (Nuevo León)	Monterrey	Monterrey International Airport	Hub	
Mexico (Oaxaca)	Huatulco	Bahías de Huatulco International Airport		
Mexico (Oaxaca)	Oaxaca	Oaxaca International Airport		
Mexico (Oaxaca)	Puerto Escondido	Puerto Escondido International Airport		
Mexico (Puebla)	Puebla	Puebla International Airport		
Mexico (Querétaro)	Querétaro	Querétaro Intercontinental Airport		
Mexico (Quintana Roo)	Cancún	Cancún International Airport	Hub	
Mexico (Quintana Roo)	Chetumal	Chetumal International Airport		
Mexico (Quintana Roo)	Cozumel	Cozumel International Airport		
Mexico (Quintana Roo)	Tulum	Tulum International Airport		
Mexico (San Luis Potosí)	San Luis Potosí	San Luis Potosí International Airport		
Mexico (Sinaloa)	Culiacán	Culiacán International Airport		
Mexico (Sinaloa)	Los Mochis	Los Mochis International Airport		
Mexico (Sinaloa)	Mazatlán	Mazatlán International Airport		
Mexico (Sonora)	Ciudad Obregón	Ciudad Obregón International Airport		
Mexico (Sonora)	Hermosillo	Hermosillo International Airport		
Mexico (State of Mexico)	Toluca/Mexico City	Toluca International Airport		
Mexico (Tabasco)	Villahermosa	Villahermosa International Airport		
Mexico (Tamaulipas)	Matamoros	Matamoros International Airport		
Mexico (Tamaulipas)	Nuevo Laredo	Nuevo Laredo International Airport		
Mexico (Tamaulipas)	Tampico	Tampico International Airport		
Mexico (Tamaulipas)	Reynosa	General Lucio Blanco International Airport		
Mexico (Veracruz)	Veracruz	Veracruz International Airport		
Mexico (Yucatán)	Mérida	Mérida International Airport	Hub	
Mexico (Zacatecas)	Zacatecas	Zacatecas International Airport	Seasonal	
United States (California)	Los Angeles	Los Angeles International Airport		
United States (California)	Oakland	Oakland San Francisco Bay Airport		
United States (Colorado)	Denver	Denver International Airport		
United States (Florida)	Miami	Miami International Airport		
United States (Florida)	Orlando	Orlando International Airport		
United States (Illinois)	Chicago	Midway International Airport	Terminated	
United States (Illinois)	Chicago	O'Hare International Airport		
United States (Ohio)	Cincinnati	Cincinnati/Northern Kentucky International Airport	Seasonal	
United States (Ohio)	Columbus	John Glenn Columbus International Airport	Seasonal	
United States (Nevada)	Las Vegas	Harry Reid International Airport		
United States (New Jersey)	Newark	Newark Liberty International Airport	Seasonal	
United States (New York)	New York	John F. Kennedy International Airport		
United States (Tennessee)	Memphis	Memphis International Airport	Seasonal	
United States (Texas)	Austin	Austin–Bergstrom International Airport		
United States (Texas)	Dallas	Dallas Fort Worth International Airport		
United States (Texas)	Harlingen	Valley International Airport	Terminated	
United States (Texas)	Houston	George Bush Intercontinental Airport		
United States (Texas)	San Antonio	San Antonio International Airport		
