= Grupo Aeroportuario del Pacífico =

Airport operator in Mexico

Grupo Aeroportuario del Pacífico, S.A.B. de C.V.
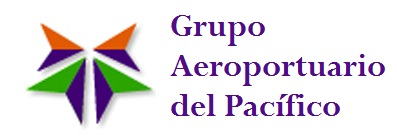
- Type: Sociedad Anónima Bursátil de Capital Variable
- Traded as: BMV: GAP; NYSE: PAC
- Industry: Airport Services
- Founded: November 1, 1998
- Headquarters: Guadalajara, Mexico
- Number of locations: 14 airports
- Area served: West of Mexico and Jamaica
- Key people: Laura Diez Barroso Azcarraga (Chairman); Fernando Bosque Mohíno (CEO)
- Revenue: ▼US$ 1,804.3 million (2024)
- Net income: ▼US$ 476.4 million (2024)
- Total assets: ▲US$ 4,382,880.9 million (2024)
- Number of employees: 3,275
- Website: www.aeropuertosgap.com.mx/en/
- Footnotes; Source: Annual Report

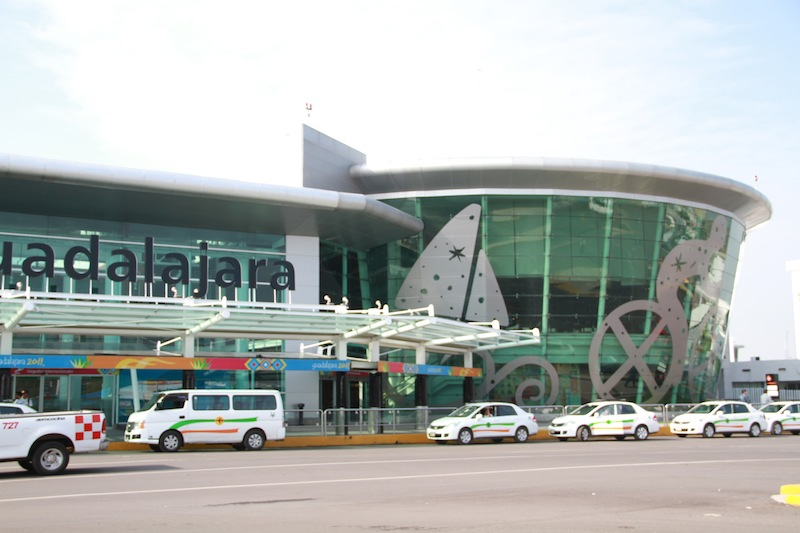
Guadalajara International Airport

Grupo Aeroportuario del Pacífico ("Pacific Airports Group"), also known as GAP, is a Mexican airport operator headquartered in Guadalajara, Mexico. It operates 12 airports in central and northwestern Mexico and two in Jamaica.

GAP's airports include major urban areas, including Guadalajara, Tijuana, and León, as well as major tourist destinations, including Los Cabos, Puerto Vallarta, and Montego Bay. It is the largest airport operator in Mexico based on passenger traffic, with over 56 million passengers traveling through its 12 terminals in Mexico, and an additional 7 million passengers travelling through Jamaica.

GAP is listed on the Mexican Stock Exchange and in the NYSE through ADRs since 2006. It is a constituent of the IPC, the main benchmark index of the Mexican Stock Exchange.

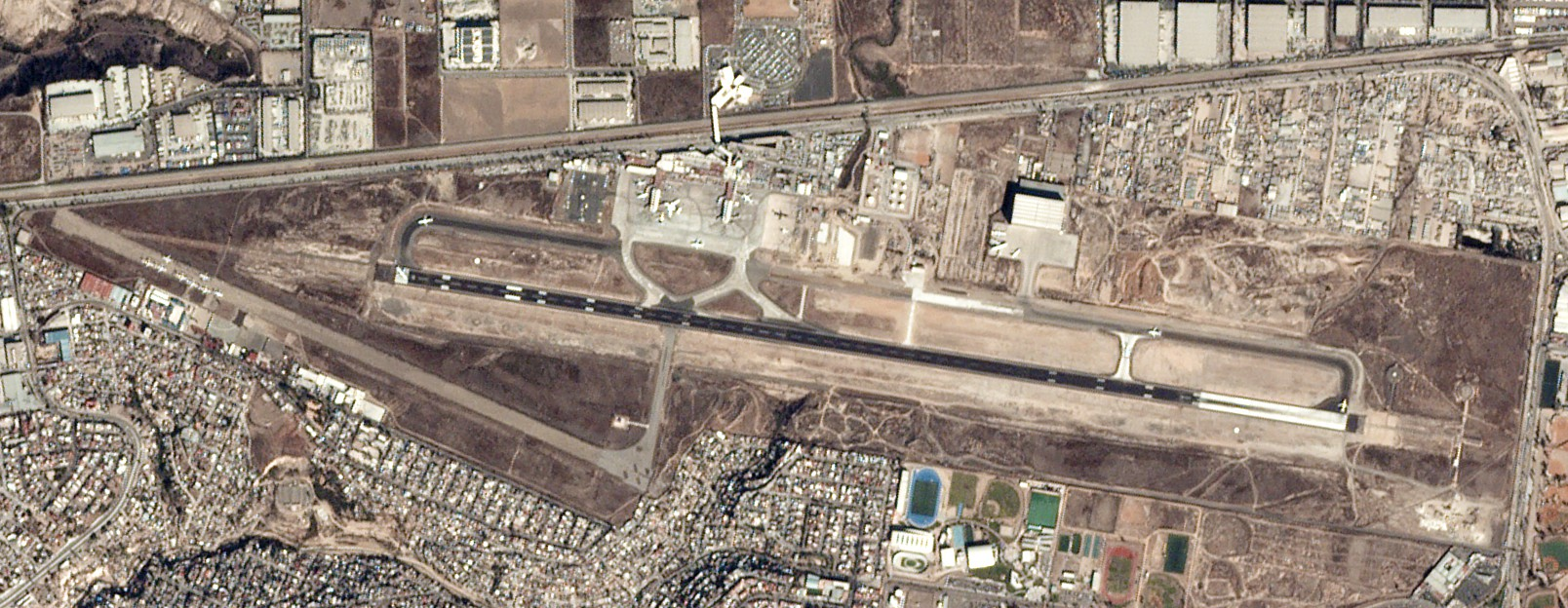
Aerial view of Tijuana International Airport

== History ==
Prior to 1998, Aeropuertos y Servicios Auxiliares (ASA), a federal corporation, was responsible for the construction, development, and operation of all airports in Mexico. At the time, ASA's network included 58 commercial airports covering major cities and tourist destinations throughout the country.

In 1995, the government privatized airport management, which allowed commercial operators to submit bids to operate 35 airports. This saw the emergence of four major private operators, including GAP, which was awarded a 50-year concession to operate 12 of the available airfields. Other groups emerging from this process included Grupo Aeroportuario Centro Norte (OMA), which was awarded a concession of 9 airports, Grupo Aeroportuario del Sureste (ASUR), with 13 airports, and Grupo Aeroportuario de la Ciudad de México, which continued to be majority-owned by the federal government, to operate Mexico City International Airport.

Since that time, GAP has administered, operated, maintained and developed twelve airports in the Central and Pacific regions of Mexico.

In 2011, GAP entered into a dispute with one of its largest shareholders, Grupo México, which held more than 20% of the Group's shares and announced plans to increase its stake to over 30%. According to GAP bylaws, no one shareholder can control more than 10% of the company's float. In 2015, the parties reached an agreement, with Grupo México announcing it has reduced its stake in GAP, although not enough to meet GAP bylaws.

In February 2006, shares of GAP were enlisted in the NYSE under "PAC", and in the Bolsa Mexicana de Valores under "GAP".

== Airports ==
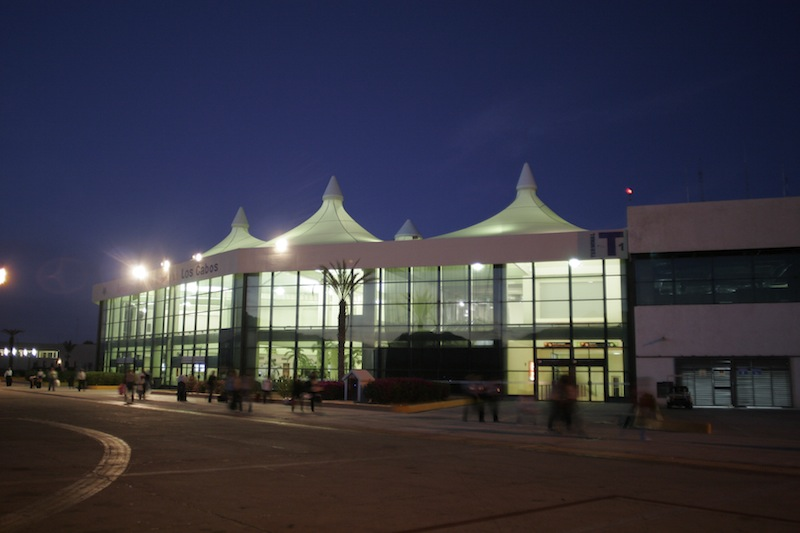
Los Cabos International Airport Terminal 1

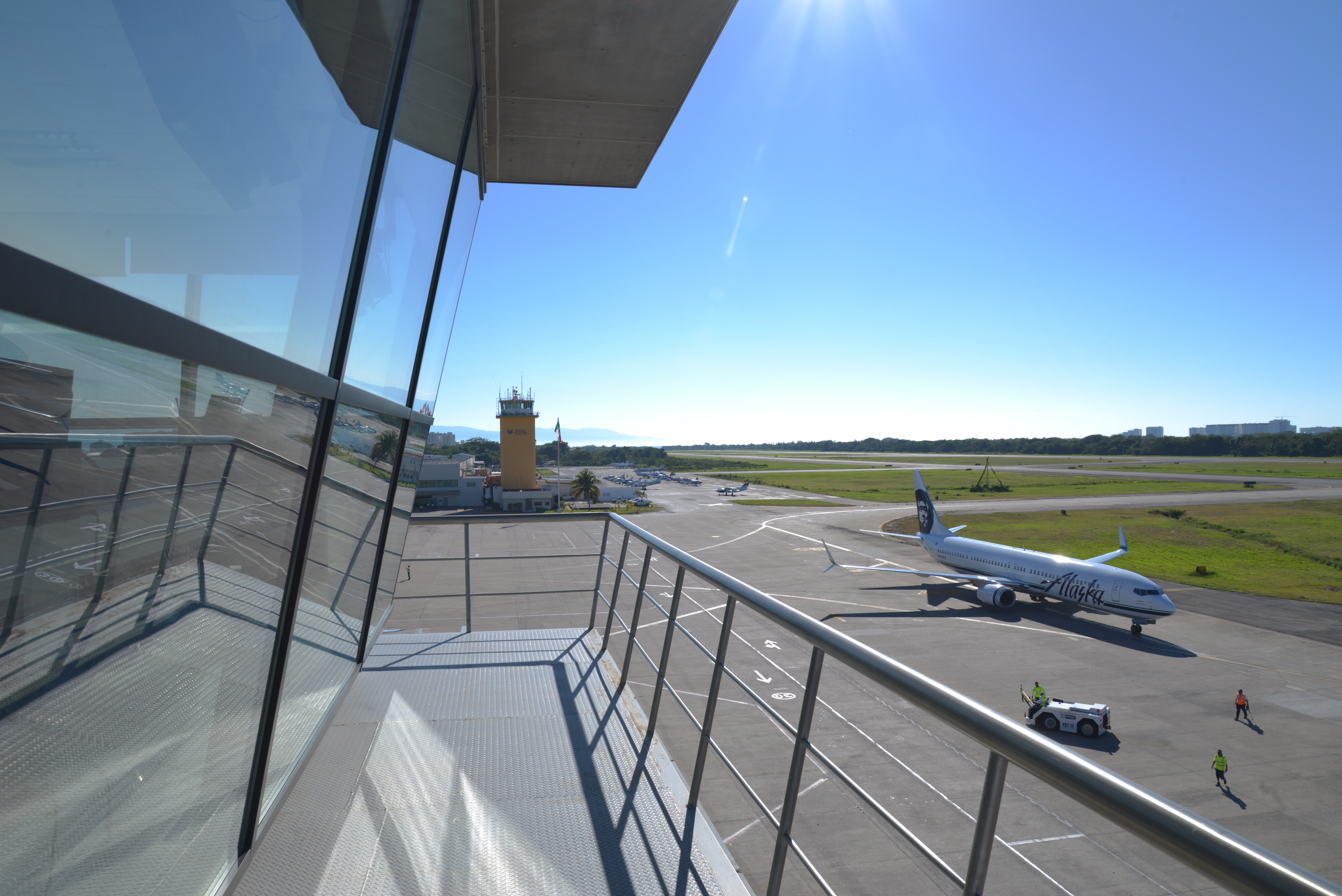
Puerto Vallarta International Airport. Apron view from the control tower

=== Airports in Mexico ===
Airport	City	State	ICAO	IATA
Aguascalientes International Airport	Aguascalientes	Aguascalientes	MMAS	AGU
Guadalajara International Airport	Guadalajara	Jalisco	MMGL	GDL
Hermosillo International Airport	Hermosillo	Sonora	MMHO	HMO
La Paz International Airport	La Paz	Baja California Sur	MMLP	LAP
Del Bajío International Airport	León	Guanajuato	MMLO	BJX
Los Cabos International Airport	Los Cabos	Baja California Sur	MMSD	SJD
Los Mochis International Airport	Los Mochis	Sinaloa	MMLM	LMM
Manzanillo International Airport	Manzanillo	Colima	MMZO	ZLO
Mexicali International Airport	Mexicali	Baja California	MMML	MXL
Morelia International Airport	Morelia	Michoacán	MMMM	MLM
Puerto Vallarta International Airport	Puerto Vallarta	Jalisco	MMPR	PVR
Tijuana International Airport	Tijuana	Baja California	MMTJ	TIJ

=== Map ===
Airports in Mexico operated by GAP
Purple = Major airports (over 5 million passengers)
Red = International and domestic service
Green = Domestic service only

=== Airports in Jamaica ===
Airport	City	Country	ICAO	IATA
Sangster International Airport	Montego Bay	Jamaica	MKJS	MBJ
Norman Manley International Airport	Kingston	Jamaica	MKJP	KIN

== Passenger numbers ==
=== Airports in Mexico ===
Number of passengers at each airport by 2025:

Rank	Airport	City	State	Passengers
1	Guadalajara International Airport	Guadalajara	Jalisco	18,696,600
2	Tijuana International Airport	Tijuana	Baja California	12,650,000
3	Los Cabos International Airport	Los Cabos	Baja California Sur	7,529,900
4	Licenciado Gustavo Díaz Ordaz International Airport	Puerto Vallarta	Jalisco	6,947,700
5	Bajío International Airport	León	Guanajuato	3,301,500
6	Hermosillo International Airport	Hermosillo	Sonora	2,203,100
7	Morelia International Airport	Morelia	Michoacán	1,508,100
8	La Paz International Airport	La Paz	Baja California Sur	1,337,600
9	Mexicali International Airport	Mexicali	Baja California	1,272,100
10	Aguascalientes International Airport	Aguascalientes	Aguascalientes	984,100
11	Los Mochis International Airport	Los Mochis	Sinaloa	713,600
12	Playa de Oro International Airport	Manzanillo	Colima	231,200
Total				63,685,700

=== Airports in Jamaica ===
Number of passengers at each airport by 2025:

Airport	City	Country	Passengers
Sangster International Airport	Montego Bay	Jamaica	4,469,100
Norman Manley International Airport	Kingston	Jamaica	1,841,200
Total			6,310,300

== Statistics ==
The company operates five of the ten busiest airport in Mexico by passenger traffic: Guadalajara (3rd), Tijuana (5th), Los Cabos (6th), Puerto Vallarta (7th), and Bajío (9th). Traffic figures have grown significantly since the group took control of the terminals, although these figures have been impacted by global events, including the 2008 financial crisis, the COVID-19 pandemic, and a product recall by Pratt & Whitney in 2023, affecting hundreds of aircraft operated by major airlines in Mexico.

== See also ==
- List of airports in Mexico
- List of the busiest airports in Mexico
- Busiest airports in North America
- Busiest airports in Latin America
- Airfields in Baja California
- Airfields in Baja California Sur
- Small airstrips
- Military bases
- Air Force bases
- Naval air bases
- Lists of airports
- International airports
- Defunct airports
- Airports by ICAO code
- Airlines of Mexico
- Airline hubs
- Airline destinations
- Transportation in Mexico
- Tourism in Mexico
- Federal Civil Aviation Agency
- Grupo Aeroportuario del Sureste
- Grupo Aeroportuario del Pacífico
- Grupo Aeroportuario del Centro Norte
- Aeropuertos y Servicios Auxiliares
- List of busiest airports by passenger traffic
- Metropolitan areas of Mexico
