= Los Cabos International Airport =

International airport serving Los Cabos, Baja California Sur, Mexico

Los Cabos International Airport Aeropuerto Internacional de Los Cabos
- Logo

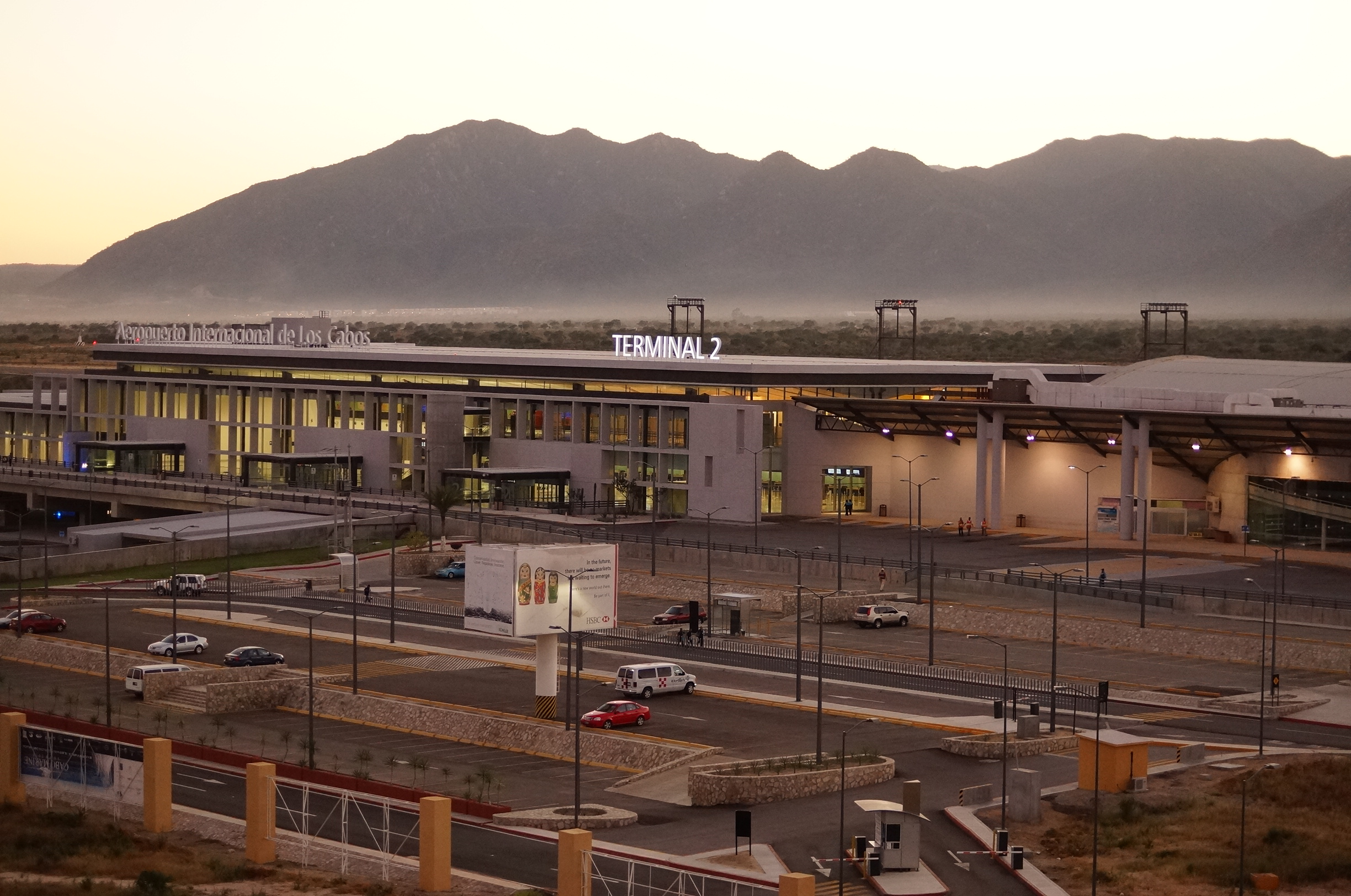
- Los Cabos International Airport in 2012
- IATA: SJD; ICAO: MMSD

Summary
- Airport type: Public
- Operator: Grupo Aeroportuario del Pacífico
- Serves: San José del Cabo and Cabo San Lucas, Los Cabos, Baja California Sur, Mexico
- Location: San José del Cabo, Baja California Sur, Mexico
- Opened: 1977; 49 years ago
- Focus city for: Viva
- Time zone: MST (UTC-07:00)
- Elevation AMSL: 114 m (374 ft)
- Coordinates: 23°09′06″N 109°43′15″W

Map
- Location of the airport in Baja California Sur SJD (Mexico)

Runways
Direction	Length		Surface
Direction	m	ft	Surface
16/34	3,000	9,843	Asphalt

Statistics (2025)
- Total passengers: 7,529,900
- Ranking in Mexico: 6th
- Source: Grupo Aeroportuario del Pacífico

Los Cabos International Airport (Spanish: Aeropuerto Internacional de Los Cabos) (IATA: SJD, ICAO: MMSD) is an international airport located in San José del Cabo, Baja California Sur, Mexico, serving as the main gateway to the Los Cabos region on the southern tip of the Baja California peninsula. It offers flights to more than 50 destinations across the Americas and Europe, primarily functioning as a major destination for most U.S. and Canadian mainline airlines. The airport is also part of a high-traffic air corridor connecting the Baja California Peninsula with Mainland Mexico.

Operated by Grupo Aeroportuario del Pacífico (GAP), the airport supports general and executive aviation, flight training, and tourism-related operations. It is the larger of two airports in the Los Cabos region; the smaller Cabo San Lucas International Airport is located approximately 26 kilometres (16 mi) to the south.

As of 2025, it is the sixth-busiest airport in Mexico and ranks 23rd in Latin America by passenger traffic. It also ranks fourth in Mexico for international passengers. In 2024, Los Cabos International Airport handled 7,488,200 passengers, and 7,529,900 in 2025.

== History ==
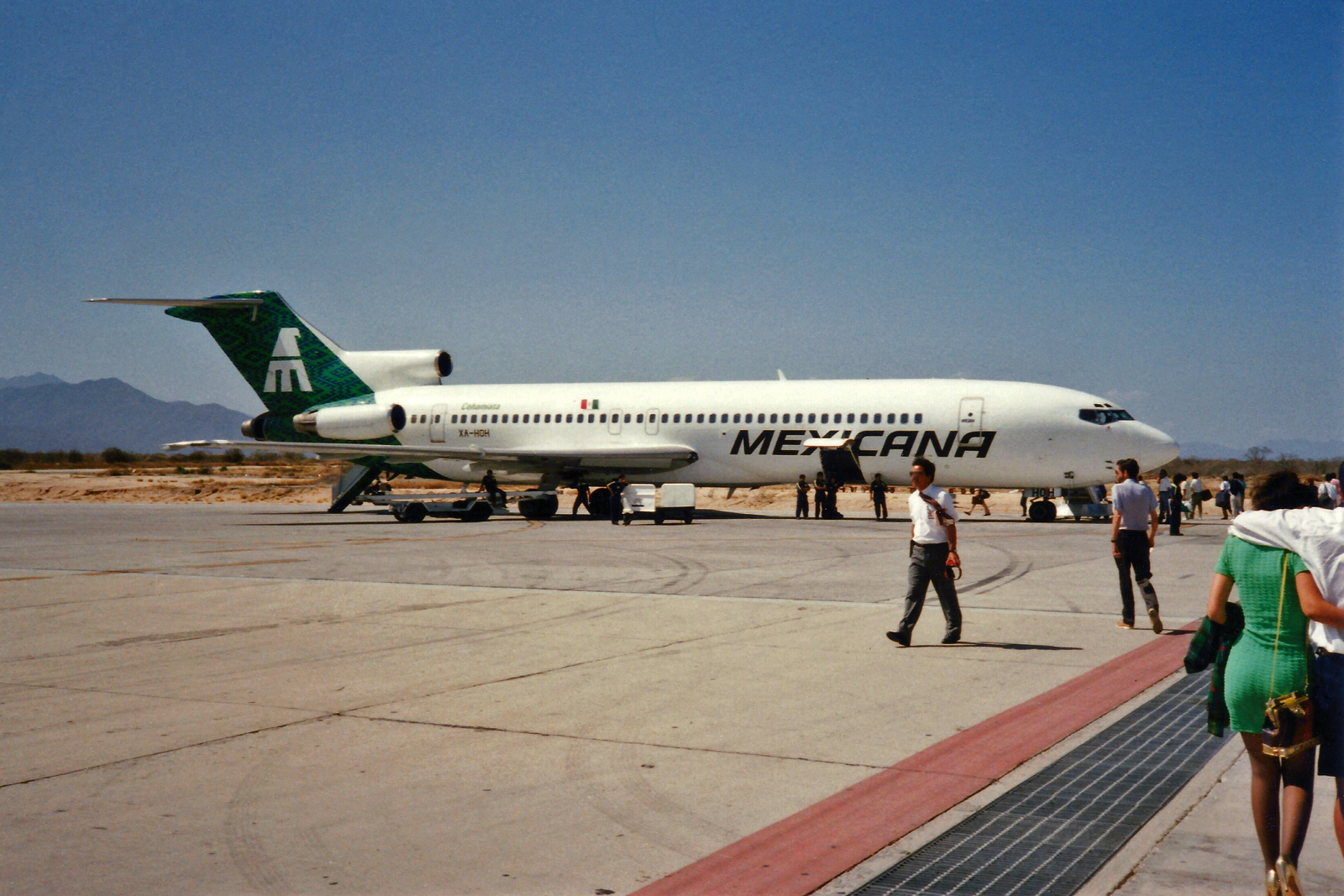
A Mexicana de Aviación Boeing 727-200 at SJD in 1993.

Los Cabos International Airport was inaugurated in 1977, featuring a provisional terminal with a tent-like roof. As the Los Cabos beach resort gained popularity among American and Canadian tourists, the airport underwent a substantial expansion and renovation in 1997, resulting in the construction of the current Terminal 1, accommodating both domestic and international flights.

In 2002, the control tower was upgraded with advanced technology during the Asia-Pacific Economic Cooperation (APEC) Forum hosted in Los Cabos. Terminal 2 was subsequently added to accommodate increased international flights, and a new highway provided direct access to the tourist zone. Between 2008 and 2011, Terminal 1 underwent renovations, and Terminal 3 was constructed adjacent to Terminal 2. The general aviation apron was relocated, and a dedicated terminal for general aviation activities was established at the northern end of the airport grounds.

In September 2011, non-stop flights to Shanghai, China were briefly operated. In 2014, Hurricane Odile caused substantial damage, leading to an 18-day suspension of operations before reopening on October 3, 2014. The airport's infrastructure has faced challenges due to a surge in resorts and rapid regional population growth, leading to congestion and reported capacity constraints during peak hours.

Between 2018 and 2020, Terminal 3 was fully integrated with Terminal 2, adopting the name Terminal 2 and undergoing further expansion in 2022 with additional jet bridges. From 2019 to 2020, TUI Airways provided flights to and from London Gatwick Airport, and since 2023, Spain-based carrier Iberojet has operated daily flights to Madrid.

== Facilities ==
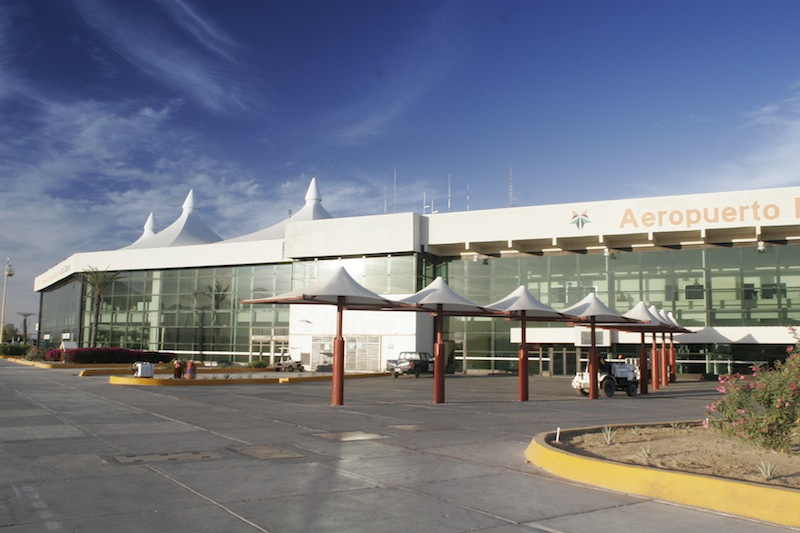
Terminal 1 airside

Los Cabos International Airport is situated 10 kilometres (6.2 mi) north of San José del Cabo, Baja California Sur, at an elevation of 114 metres (374 ft) above mean sea level. The airport features a single runway, designated as 16/34, measuring 3,000 metres (9,800 ft) with an asphalt surface. The commercial aviation apron accommodates 22 narrow-body aircraft. Nonetheless, the airport is also capable of accommodating wide-body aircraft. For general aviation, there is a dedicated apron with stands for fixed-wing aircraft and helipads for private aviation. The airport operates two terminals.

=== Terminal 1 ===
Terminal 1, covering an area of 16,580 square metres (178,500 sq ft), houses arrival and departure facilities for domestic flights within a single-story building. It features a distinctive roof over the departures concourse with peaked white structures. The arrivals area includes a baggage claim, car rental services, taxi stands, snack bars, and souvenir shops. The departures section includes a check-in area, a security checkpoint, and a concourse with a food court and eight gates on the ground level, allowing passengers to walk to their aircraft. A mezzanine level, housing a VIP lounge, is accessible from the departure concourse.

=== Terminal 2 ===
Terminal 2 is a two-story structure. The ground floor manages arrivals with customs and immigration facilities, a baggage claim area, car rental services, taxi stands, snack bars, and souvenir shops. The upper floor is dedicated to departures, featuring check-in areas, a security checkpoint, and a 400 metres (1,300 ft) long departure concourse. This section includes restaurants, food stands, duty-free shops, and 19 gates, nine of which are equipped with jet bridges. A VIP lounge in Terminal 2 is located past security, near the central food court.

== Airlines and destinations ==
=== Passenger ===
Airlines	Destinations
Aero	Charter: Los Angeles–Van Nuys
Aeroméxico	Mexico City–Benito Juárez
Aeroméxico Connect	Mexico City–Benito Juárez
Air Canada	Seasonal: Montreal–Trudeau, Toronto–Pearson, Vancouver
Air Transat	Seasonal: Montréal–Trudeau (begins 10 December 2026)
Alaska Airlines	Los Angeles, Portland (OR), San Diego, San Francisco, Seattle/Tacoma; Seasonal: San Jose (CA)
American Airlines	Austin, Chicago–O'Hare, Dallas/Fort Worth, Los Angeles, Phoenix–Sky Harbor; Seasonal: Charlotte
Condor	Seasonal: Frankfurt
Copa Airlines	Panama City–Tocumen
Delta Air Lines	Atlanta, Los Angeles, Salt Lake City, Seattle/Tacoma; Seasonal: Austin, Detroit, Minneapolis/St. Paul, New York–JFK
Flair Airlines	Seasonal: Vancouver
JetBlue	New York–JFK
Mexicana de Aviación	Mexico City–Felipe Ángeles
Porter Airlines	Seasonal: Edmonton, Ottawa (begins 18 December 2026), Toronto–Pearson
Southwest Airlines	Denver, Houston–Hobby, Las Vegas, Orange County, Phoenix–Sky Harbor, Sacramento, San Diego; Seasonal: Austin, Baltimore, Chicago–Midway, Indianapolis, Kansas City, Nashville, Oakland, St. Louis
Sun Country Airlines	Seasonal: Minneapolis/St. Paul
United Airlines	Chicago–O'Hare, Denver, Houston–Intercontinental, Los Angeles, Newark, San Francisco; Seasonal: Washington–Dulles
Viva	Culiacán, Guadalajara, Hermosillo, Mexico City–Benito Juárez, Mexico City–Felipe Ángeles, Monterrey, Querétaro, Tijuana, Toluca/Mexico City, Torreón/Gómez Palacio
Volaris	Cancún (begins December 1, 2026), Culiacán, Guadalajara, León/El Bajío, Mexicali, Mexico City–Benito Juárez, Mexico City–Felipe Ángeles, Puebla, Tijuana, Toluca/Mexico City
WestJet	Calgary, Montreal–Trudeau, Toronto–Pearson, Vancouver; Seasonal: Edmonton, Kelowna, Regina (begins 14 December 2026), Victoria, Winnipeg

== Statistics ==
=== Annual Traffic ===
Passenger statistics at Los Cabos International Airport
Year	Total Passengers	change %
2010	2,745,500	Steady
2011	2,807,000	▲2.25%
2012	3,018,500	▲7.55%
2013	3,234,287	▲7.20%
2014	3,130,986	▼3.26%
2015	3,523,010	▲12.55%
2016	4,089,000	▲16.05%
2017	4,701,580	▲14.99%
2018	5,249,000	▲11.6%
2019	5,609,100	▲6.9%
2020	3,064,200	▼45.4%
2021	5,549,600	▲81.1%
2022	7,019,300	▲25.1%
2023	7,715,500	▲9.9%
2024	7,488,100	▼2.9%
2025	7,529,900	▲0.6%

=== Busiest routes ===
Busiest domestic routes from SJD (Jan–Dec 2025)
Rank	Airport	Passengers
1	Mexico City, Mexico City	419,920
2	Guadalajara, Jalisco	258,929
3	Tijuana, Baja California	252,979
4	Culiacán, Sinaloa	99,845
5	Toluca, State of Mexico	96,262
6	Monterrey, Nuevo León	95,645
7	Mexico City-AIFA, State of Mexico	87,061
8	León/El Bajío, Guanajuato	29,659
9	Querétaro, Querétaro	23,357
10	Mexicali, Baja California	18,787

Busiest international routes from SJD (Jan–Dec 2025)
Rank	Airport	Passengers
1	Los Angeles, United States	300,465
2	Dallas/Fort Worth, United States	248,583
3	Phoenix–Sky Harbor, United States	204,079
4	Houston (Intercontinental and Hobby, United States) (Note: The official statistics combine both George Bush Intercontinental and Hobby airports.)	189,875
5	San Francisco, United States	158,083
6	Denver, United States	134,569
7	Seattle–Tacoma, United States	113,636
8	Chicago (O'Hare and Midway, United States) (Note: The official statistics combine both O'Hare and Midway airports.)	91,926
9	San Diego, United States	83,763
10	Atlanta, United States	81,581

== See also ==
- List of the busiest airports in Mexico
- List of airports in Mexico
- List of airports by ICAO code: M
- List of busiest airports in North America
- List of the busiest airports in Latin America
- Transportation in Mexico
- Tourism in Mexico
- Grupo Aeroportuario del Pacífico
- Los Cabos Corridor
