= Mexicali International Airport =

International airport in Mexicali, Baja California, Mexico

Mexicali International Airport Aeropuerto Internacional de Mexicali
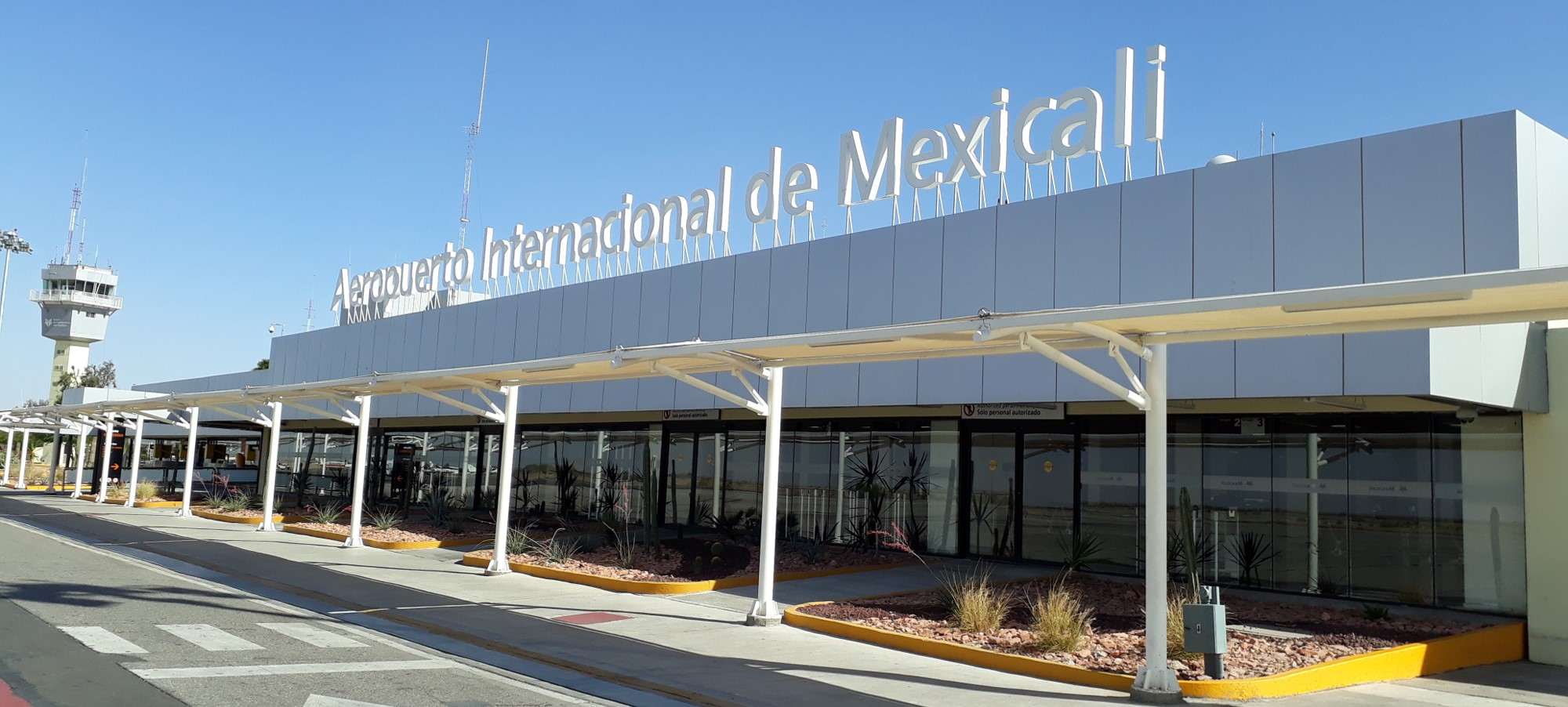
- IATA: MXL; ICAO: MMML

Summary
- Airport type: Public
- Owner/Operator: Grupo Aeroportuario del Pacífico
- Serves: Mexicali, Baja California, Mexico
- Focus city for: Volaris
- Time zone: PST (UTC-08:00)
  - Summer (DST): PDT (UTC-07:00)
- Elevation AMSL: 23 m (75 ft)
- Coordinates: 32°37′50″N 115°14′29″W
- Website: www.aeropuertosgap.com.mx/en/mexicali-3.html

Map
- Location of the airport in Baja California MXL (Mexico)

Runways
| Direction | Length | | Surface |
| Direction | m | ft | Surface |
|---|---|---|---|
| 10/28 | 2,600 | 8,530 | Concrete |

Statistics (2025)
- Total passengers: 1,272,100
- Ranking in Mexico: 24th ▲2
- Source: Grupo Aeroportuario del Pacífico

Mexicali International Airport (Spanish: Aeropuerto Internacional de Mexicali); officially Aeropuerto Internacional General Rodolfo Sánchez Taboada (General Rodolfo Sánchez Taboada International Airport) (IATA: MXL, ICAO: MMML) is an international airport located 20 kilometers east of Mexicali, Baja California, Mexico, near the U.S.-Mexico border. It is the northernmost airport in Mexico and serves the metropolitan area of Mexicali and the transborder region of Calexico-Mexicali. In addition to domestic flights within Mexico, the airport also facilitates domestic and international charter flights, flight training, and executive, and general aviation activities.

Grupo Aeroportuario del Pacífico owns and operates the airport, which is named in honor of Rodolfo Sánchez Taboada, a Mexican military officer, politician, and former Governor of Baja California. The airport is a focus city for Volaris serving 9 domestic destinations. Mexicali Airport handled 1,272,100 passengers in 2025, a 23.01% increase from previous year.

== Facilities ==
The airport is located at an elevation of 23 metres (75 ft) and covers an area of 535 hectares (1,320 acres). It features a 2,600-metre (8,500 ft) long and 45-metre (148 ft) wide concrete runway that can handle narrow-body aircraft. There are two aprons: one for commercial aviation, constructed with hydraulic concrete and equipped with five parking positions, and another for general aviation, made of asphalt, offering 24 parking positions for small aircraft and three helipads. Other facilities include the control tower, a building for aircraft rescue and firefighting, a machinery room, visual aids, three hangars, and a water treatment plant. The airport has a capacity of operating 18 flights per hour.

The passenger terminal is a one-story structure that accommodates arrivals and departures, offering standard services typically found at regional airports. These services include parking facilities, a check-in area, security areas, a VIP lounge, retail outlets, immigration, and customs facilities, baggage-claim zones, an arrivals hall with car rental services and taxi stands, and a departure concourse with five gates that provide direct access to the apron, allowing passengers to board their planes by walking to the aircraft.

Additionally, the airport houses logistics and courier companies and includes a dedicated general aviation terminal for various activities, including executive and general aviation, as well as administrative facilities.

== Airlines and destinations ==
=== Passenger ===
| Airlines | Destinations |
|---|---|
| Aeroméxico | Mexico City–Benito Juárez |
| Aeroméxico Connect | Mexico City–Benito Juárez |
| Viva | Cancún,^{1} Monterrey |
| Volaris | Culiacán, Guadalajara, Hermosillo, León/El Bajío, Los Mochis, Mexico City–Benito Juárez, Puerto Vallarta, San José del Cabo |

Notes:
^1Viva flight to Cancún makes a stopover in Monterrey.

=== Destinations map ===
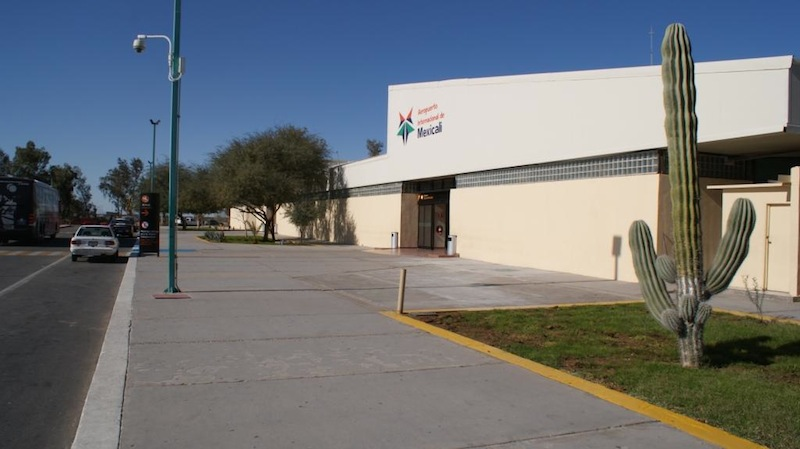
Passenger terminal

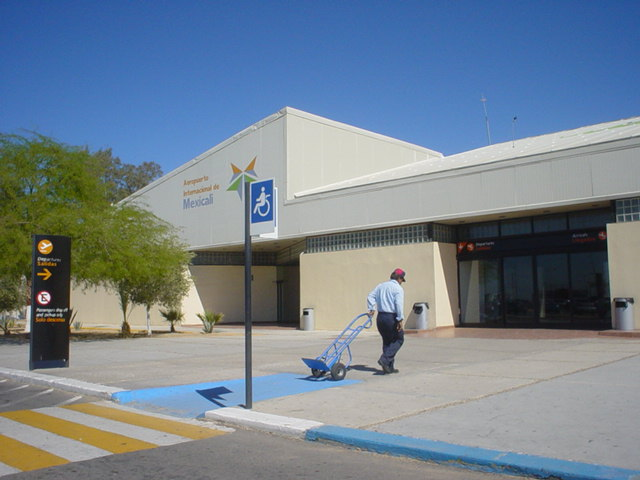
Passenger terminal entrance

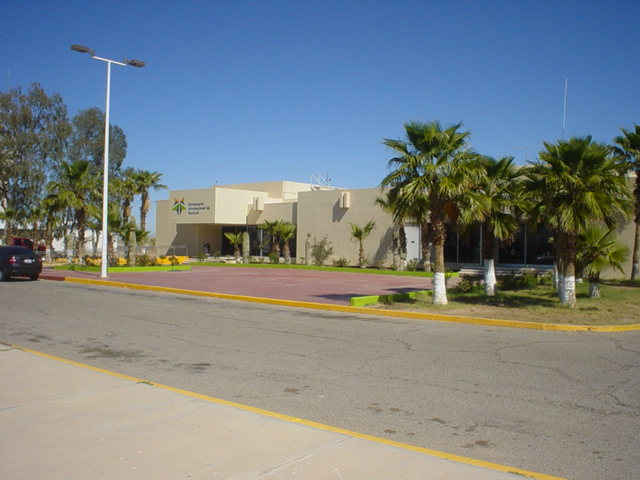
General aviation terminal and commander's office

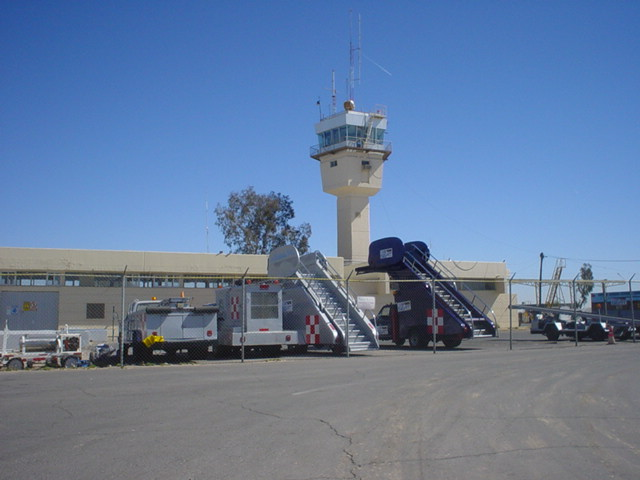
Control tower

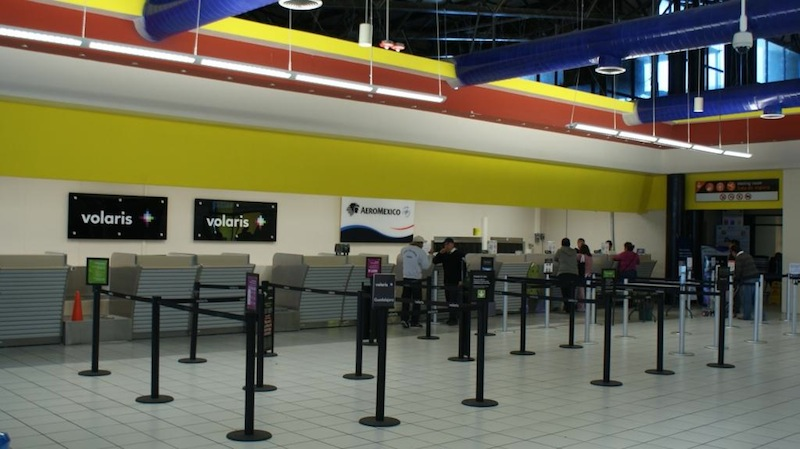
Check-in area

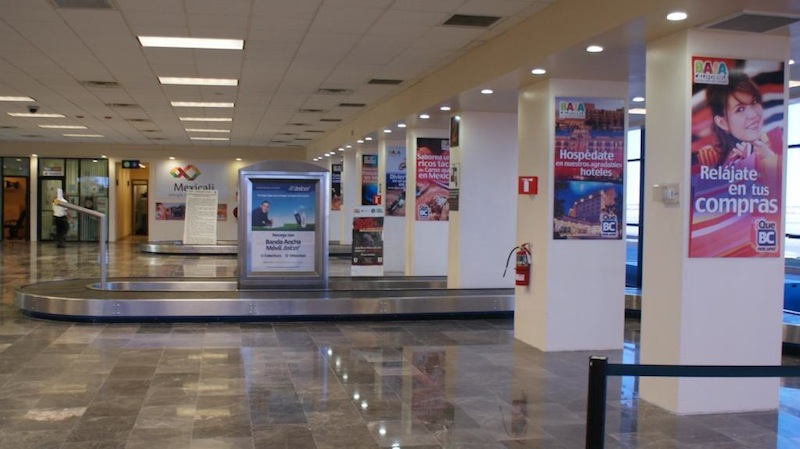
Baggage-claim area

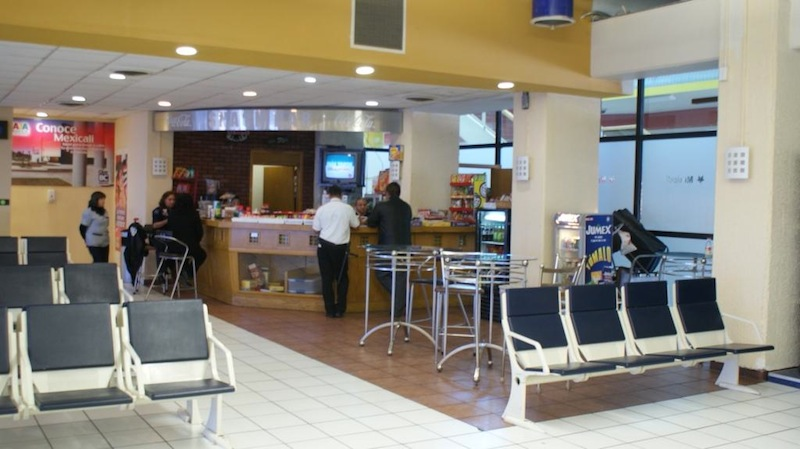
Snacks bar at the arrivals hall

Domestic destinations from Mexicali International Airport
Red = Year-round destination
Blue = Future destination
Green = Seasonal destination

== Statistics ==
=== Busiest routes ===
Busiest domestic routes from MXL (Jan–Dec 2025)
| Rank | City | Airport |
|---|---|---|
| 1 | Guadalajara, Jalisco | 195,964 |
| 2 | Mexico City, Mexico City | 190,415 |
| 3 | Monterrey, Nuevo León | 70,410 |
| 4 | Culiacán, Sinaloa | 42,042 |
| 5 | León/Bajío, Guanajuato | 23,137 |
| 6 | Hermosillo, Sonora | 22,689 |
| 7 | Los Mochis, Sinaloa | 20,123 |
| 8 | Puerto Vallarta, Jalisco | 17,519 |
| 9 | San José del Cabo, Baja California Sur | 16,998 |
| 10 | Morelia, Michoacán | 10,259 |

== See also ==
- List of the busiest airports in Mexico
- List of airports in Mexico
- List of airports by ICAO code: M
- List of busiest airports in North America
- List of the busiest airports in Latin America
- Transportation in Mexico
- Tourism in Mexico
- Grupo Aeroportuario del Pacífico
- Mexicali Municipality
- Calexico–Mexicali
- Southern Border Region (California)
- Imperial County, California
- Imperial Valley
- El Pinacate y Gran Desierto de Altar Biosphere Reserve
