= Aguascalientes International Airport =

International airport in Aguascalientes, Mexico

Aguascalientes International Airport Aeropuerto Internacional de Aguascalientes
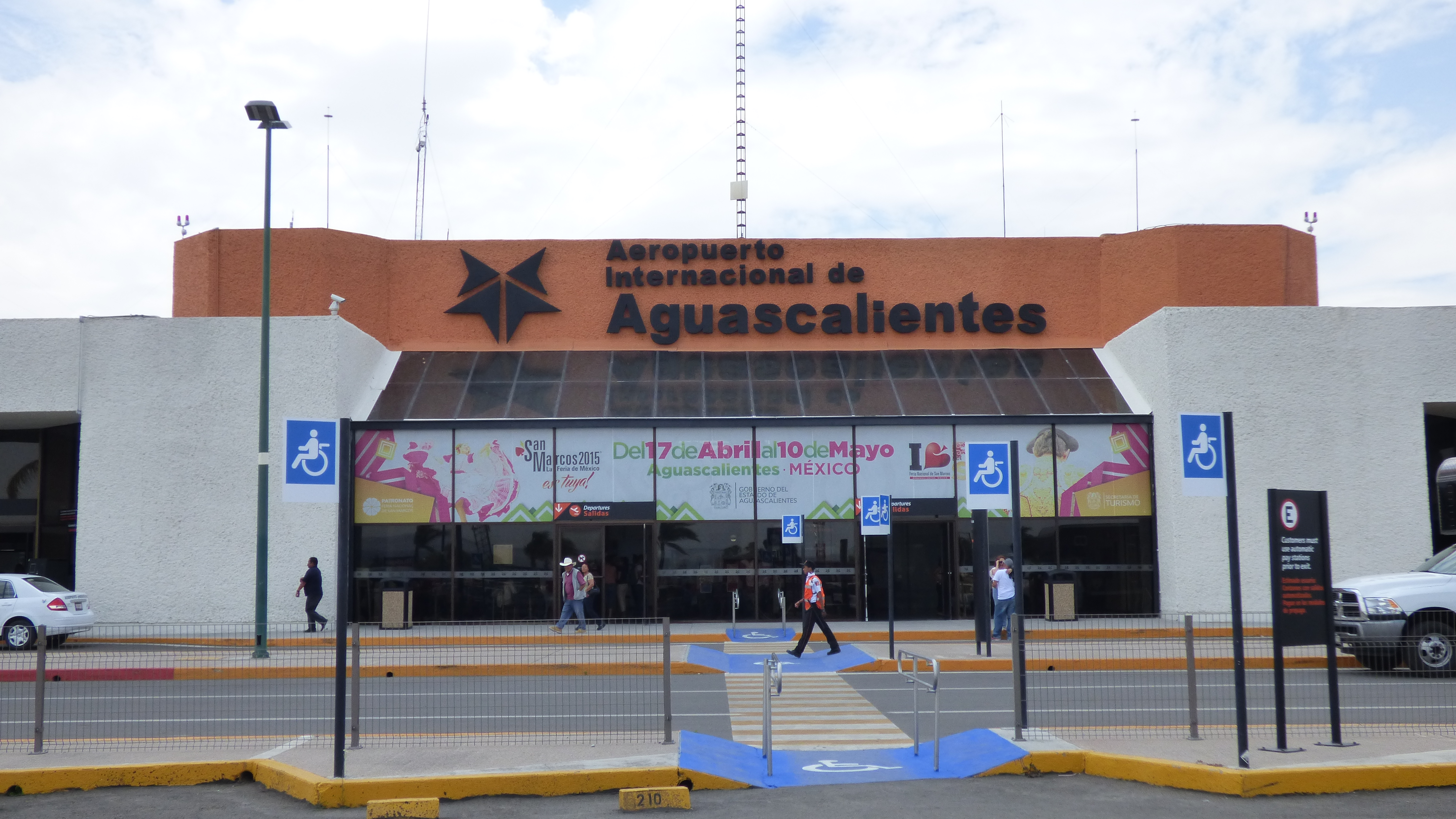
- IATA: AGU; ICAO: MMAS

Summary
- Airport type: Public
- Owner/Operator: Grupo Aeroportuario del Pacífico
- Serves: Aguascalientes, Aguascalientes, Mexico
- Time zone: CST (UTC−06:00)
- Elevation AMSL: 1,863 m / 6,112 ft
- Coordinates: 21°42′20″N 102°19′04″W
- Website: www.aeropuertosgap.com.mx/en/aguascalientes-3.html

Map
- Location of the airport in Aguascalientes AGU (Mexico)

Runways
Direction	Length		Surface
Direction	m	ft	Surface
17/35	3,000	9,843	Asphalt
~~04/22~~ (closed)	~~1,060~~	~~3,478~~	~~Asphalt~~

Statistics (2025)
- Total passengers: 984,100
- Ranking in Mexico: 27th
- Source: Grupo Aeroportuario del Pacífico

Aguascalientes International Airport (Spanish: Aeropuerto Internacional de Aguascalientes); officially Aeropuerto Internacional Lic. Jesús Terán Peredo (Lic. Jesús Terán Peredo International Airport) (IATA: AGU, ICAO: MMAS) is an international airport in Aguascalientes, Mexico. It serves both domestic and international air traffic for the Metropolitan area of Aguascalientes, which is the capital city of the State of Aguascalientes in Mexico. It also supports a variety of executive and general aviation activities.

The airport is named after Jesús Terán Peredo, who was the governor of Aguascalientes from 1855 to 1857 and was one of the first individuals to recognize Benito Juárez as Mexico's president. The airport's operations are managed by Grupo Aeroportuario del Pacífico. In 2024, the airport handled 961,800 passengers, and this number increased to 984,100 in 2025.

== Facilities ==
The airport is located at an elevation of 1,863 metres (6,112 ft) above mean sea level. It has one active runway, designated as Runway 17/35, with an asphalt surface measuring 3,000 by 45 metres (9,843 by 148 ft). A former runway, designated as Runway 04/22, is now closed.

The passenger terminal has the capacity to handle 1.5 million passengers. It comprises arrival and departure facilities for both domestic and international flights within a single-story building. The terminal features four gates, a VIP lounge, a restaurant, parking facilities, car rental services, and various small shops. Additionally, the airport features an apron dedicated to general and executive aviation services.

== Airlines and destinations ==
=== Passengers ===
Airlines	Destinations
Aeroméxico	Mexico City–Benito Juárez
Aerus	Monterrey
American Eagle	Dallas/Fort Worth
United Express	Houston–Intercontinental
Viva	Mexico City–Felipe Ángeles
Volaris	Cancún, Chicago–Midway, Los Angeles, Puebla, Puerto Vallarta, Tijuana; Seasonal: Mexico City–Felipe Ángeles

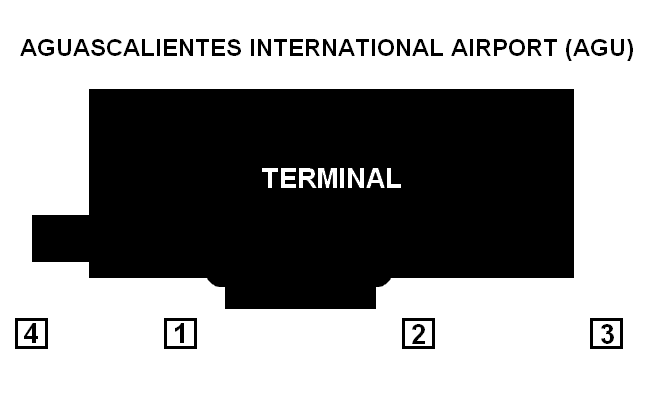
Passenger terminal diagram

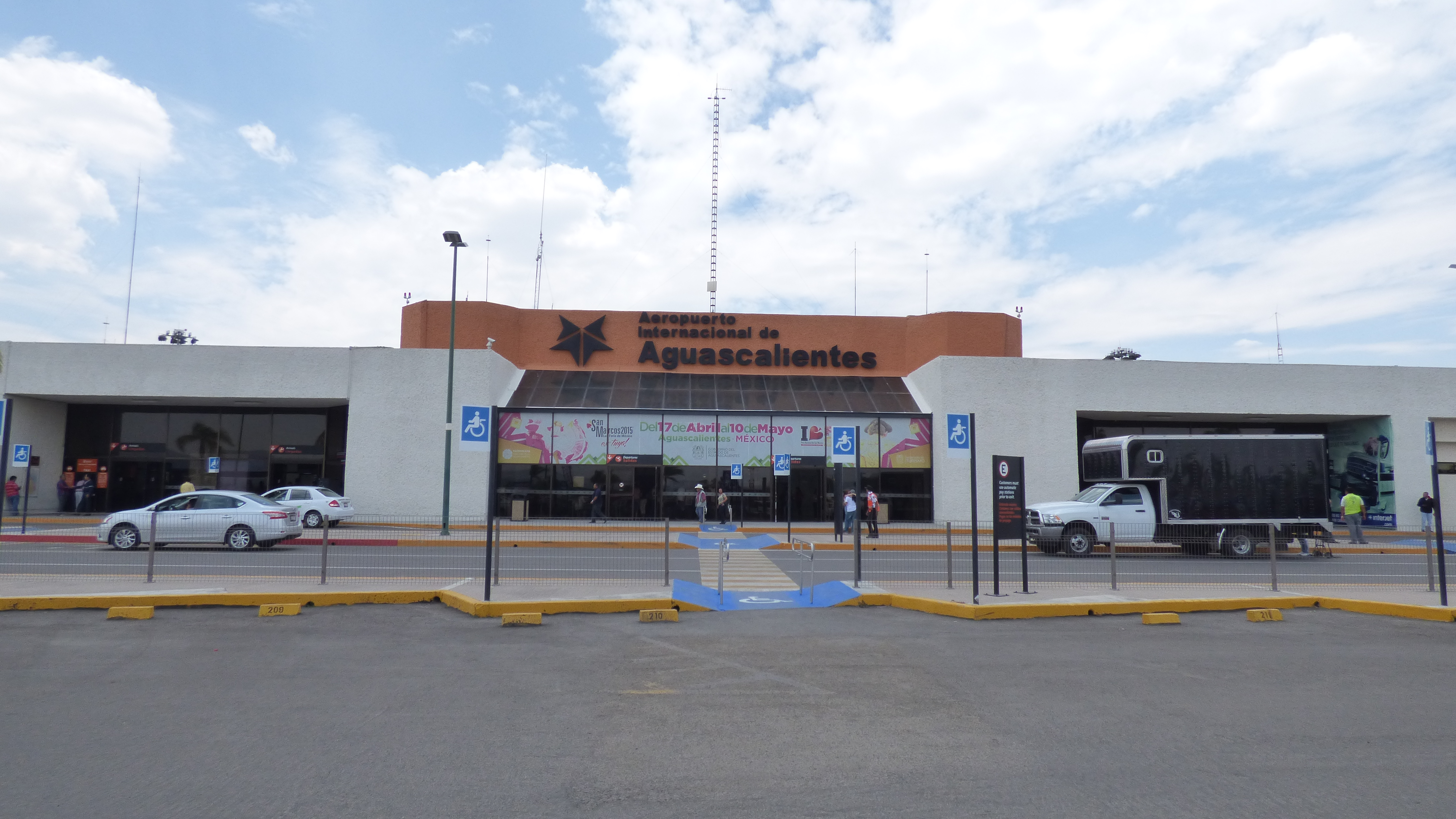
Passenger terminal

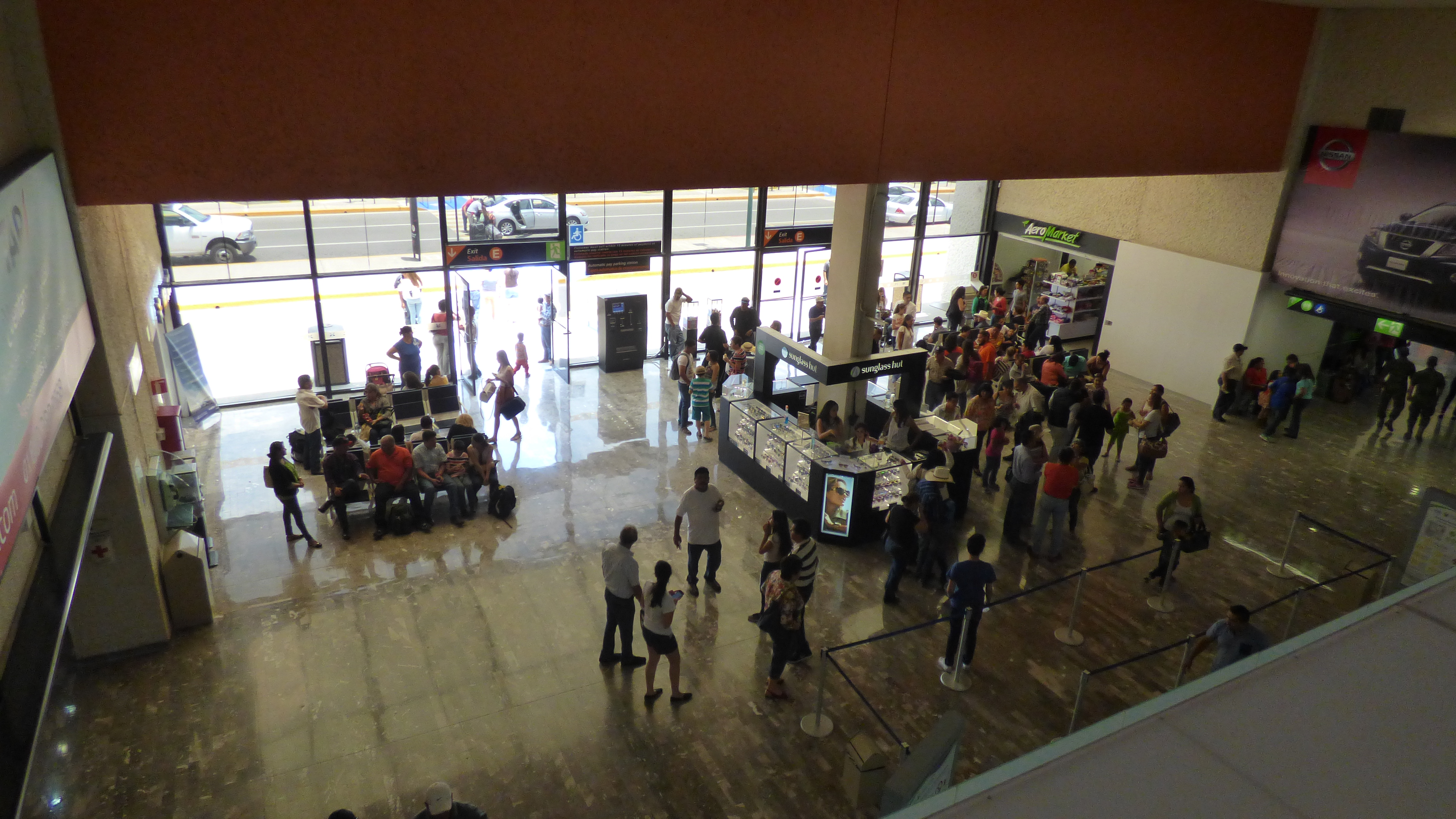
Passenger terminal main hall

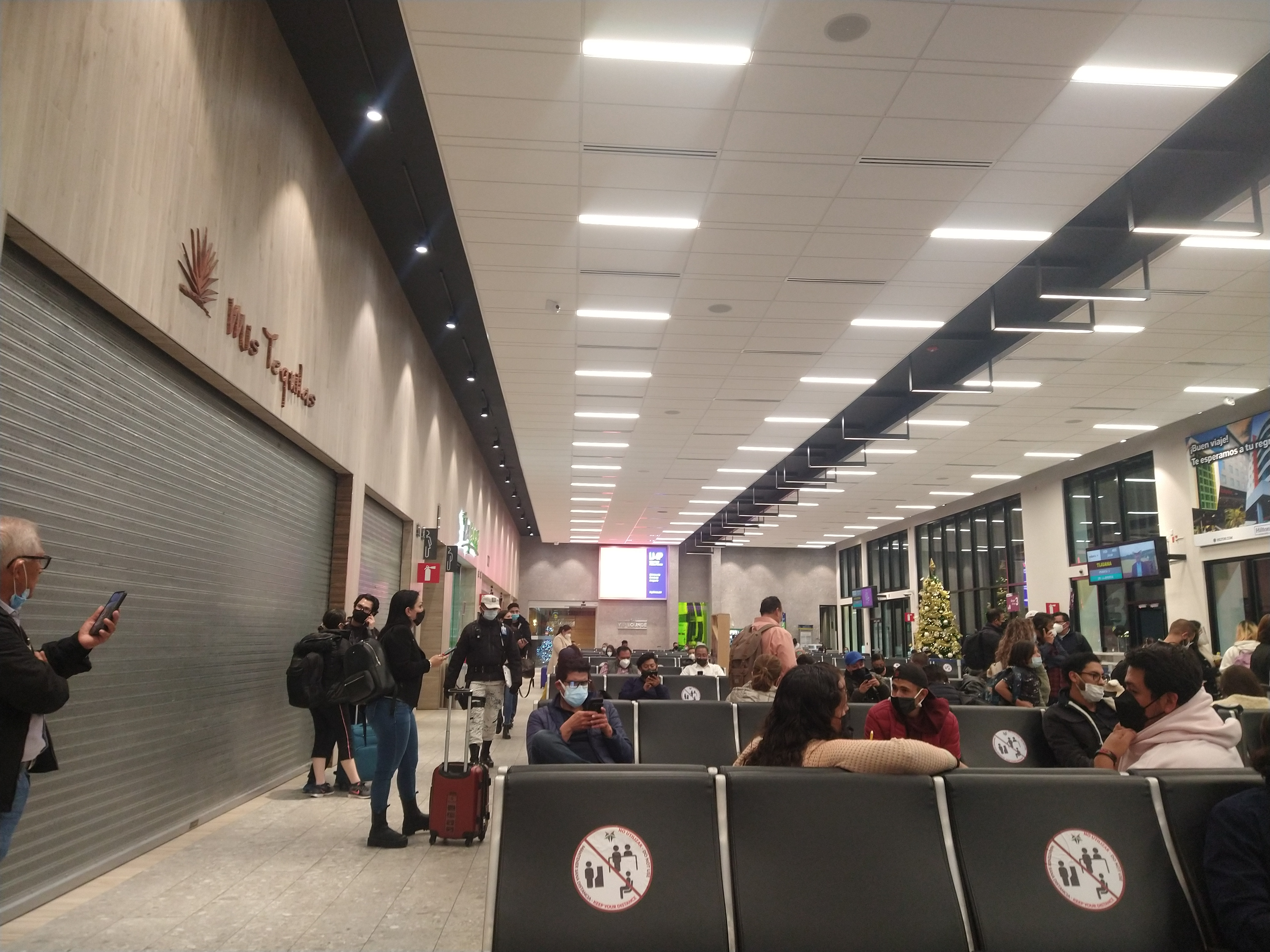
Departures concourse

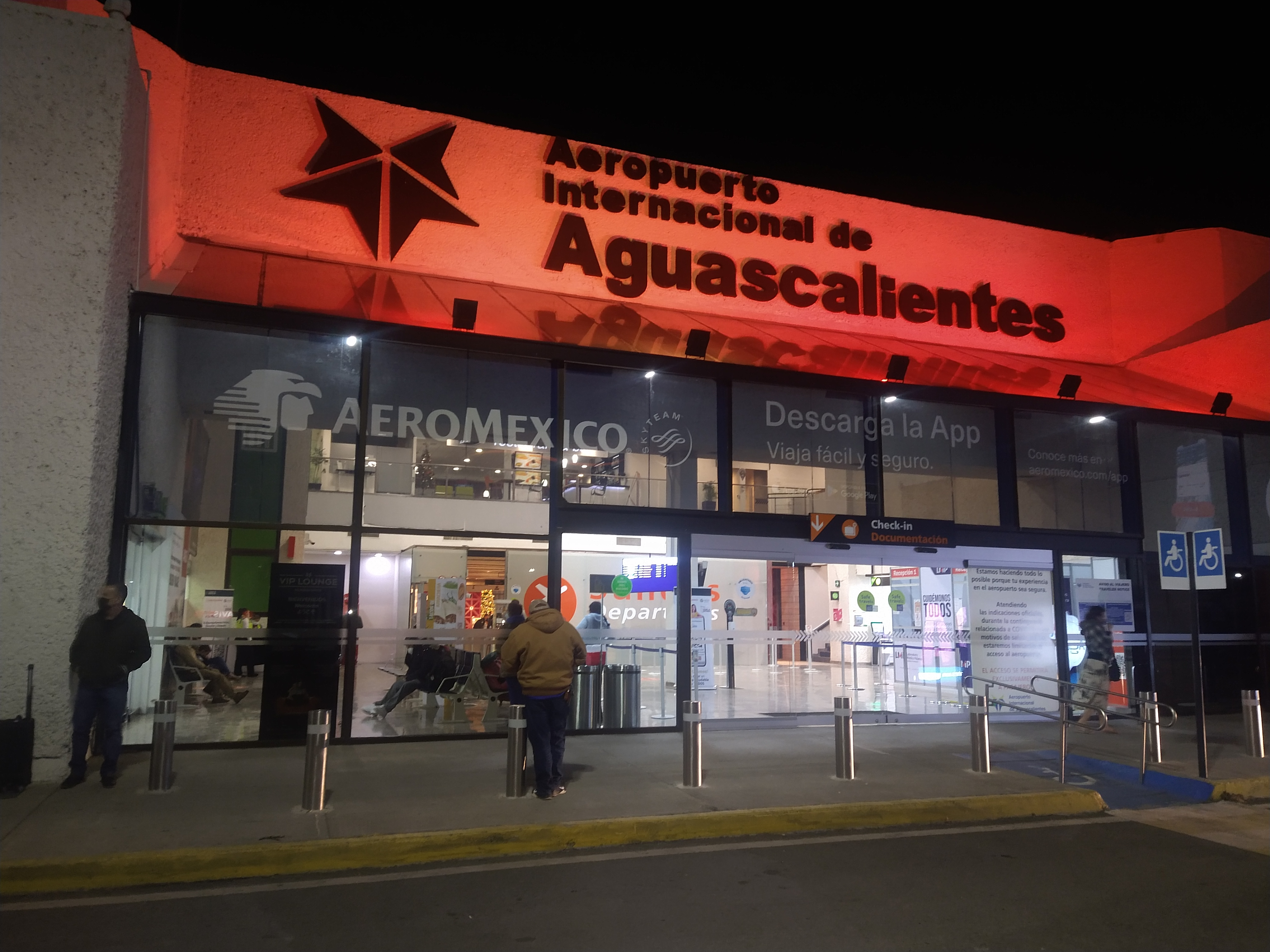
Main entrance

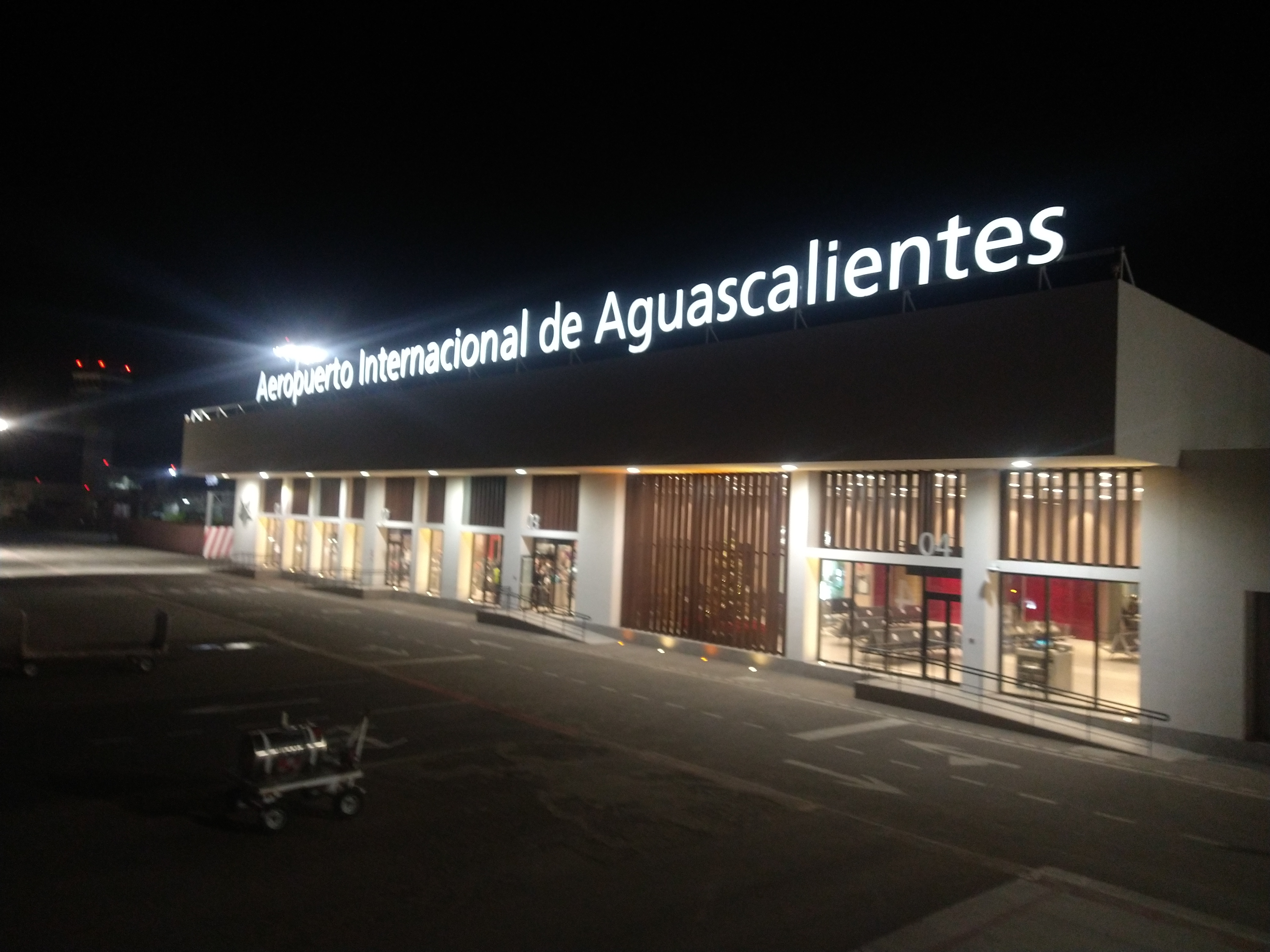
Gates area

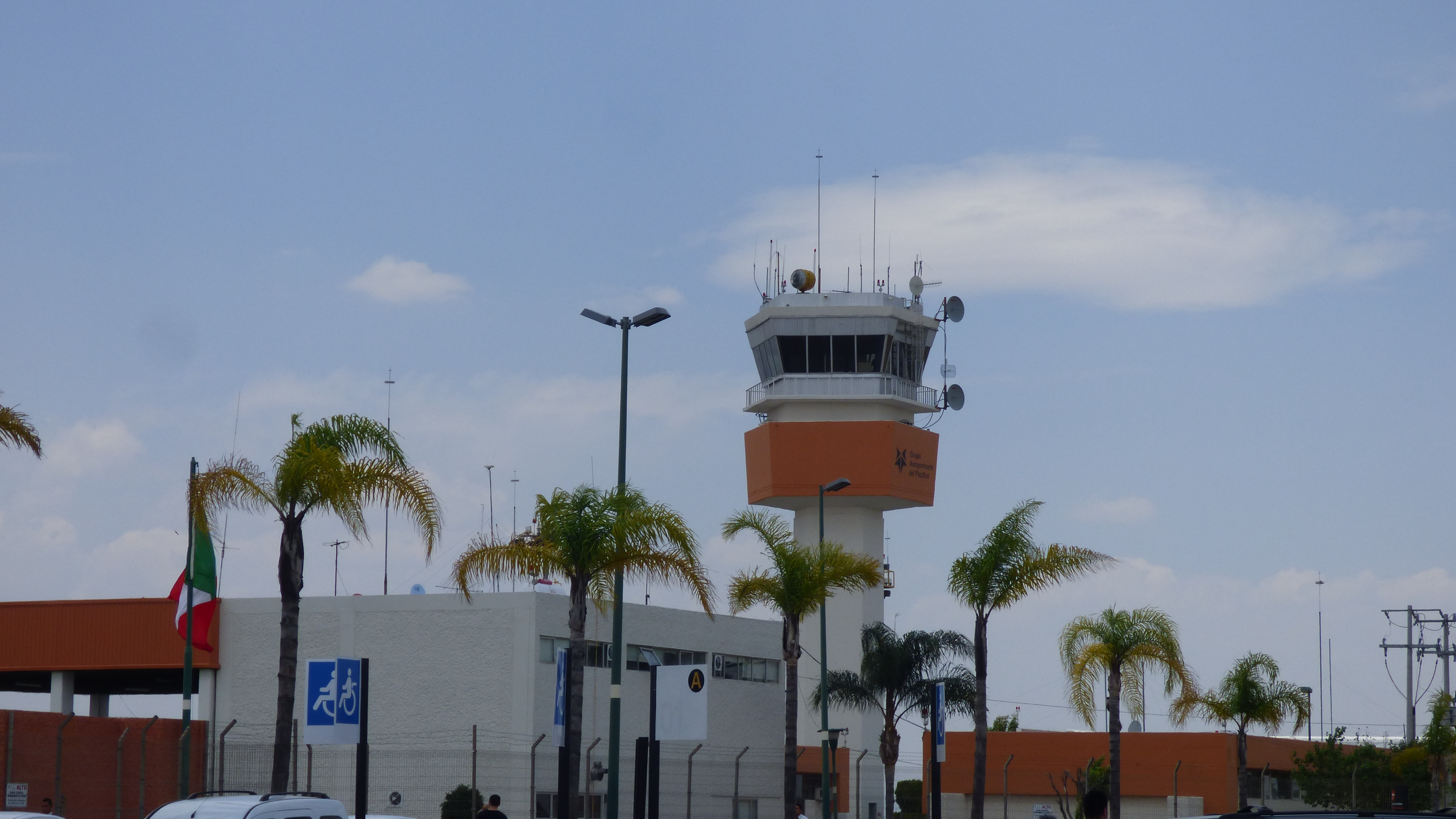
Control tower

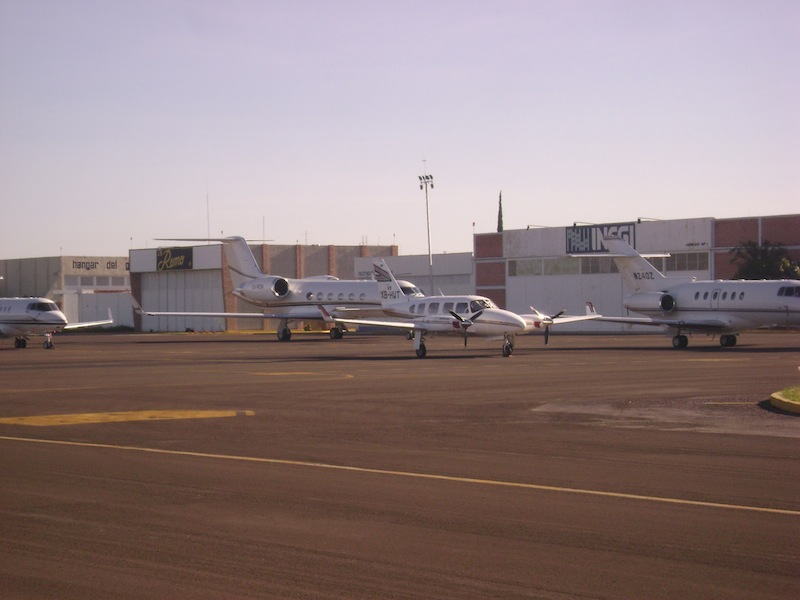
General aviation apron

=== Destinations map ===
Domestic destinations from Aguascalientes International Airport
Red = Year-round destination
Blue = Future destination
Green = Seasonal destination
International destinations from Aguascalientes International Airport
Red = Year-round destination
Blue = Future destination
Green = Seasonal/charter destination

== Statistics ==
=== Annual Traffic ===
Passenger statistics at AGU
Year	Total Passengers	change %
2008	421,900	Steady
2009	284,500	▼32.56%
2010	294,100	▲3.40%
2011	328,500	▲11.70%
2012	400,100	▲21.80%
2013	456,600	▲14.10%
2014	540,500	▲18.37%
2015	633,100	▲17.10%
2016	693,700	▲9.60%
2017	754,100	▲8.7%
2018	855,669	▲15.54%
2019	847,975	▼0.90%
2020	475,600	▼44.6%
2021	793,400	▲66.8%
2022	929,300	▲17.1%
2023	928,000	▼0.1%
2024	961,800	▲3.6%
2025	984,100	▲2.3%

=== Busiest routes ===
Busiest routes from AGU (Jan–Dec 2025)
Rank	Airport	Passengers
1	Mexico City, Mexico City	155,172
2	Tijuana, Baja California	128,995
3	Houston–Intercontinental, United States	40,887
4	Dallas/Fort Worth, United States	38,652
5	Chicago–Midway, United States	34,253
6	Los Angeles, United States	33,458
7	Cancún, Quintana Roo	30,637
8	Monterrey, Nuevo León	6,800
9	Puerto Vallarta, Jalisco	6,788
10	La Paz, Baja California Sur	1,966

== See also ==
- List of the busiest airports in Mexico
- List of airports in Mexico
- List of airports by ICAO code: M
- List of busiest airports in North America
- List of the busiest airports in Latin America
- Transportation in Mexico
- Tourism in Mexico
- Grupo Aeroportuario del Pacífico
- Metropolitan areas of Mexico
- State of Aguascalientes
- San Marcos Fair
