= Playa de Oro International Airport =

International airport in Manzanillo, Colima, Mexico

Manzanillo International Airport Aeropuerto Internacional de Manzanillo
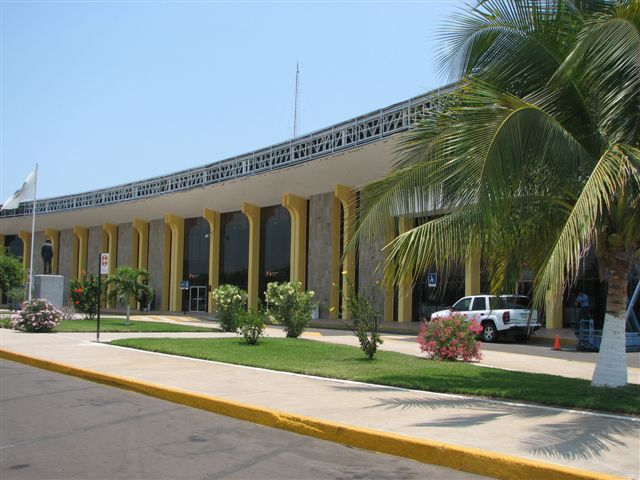
- IATA: ZLO; ICAO: MMZO

Summary
- Airport type: Public
- Operator: Grupo Aeroportuario del Pacífico
- Serves: Manzanillo, Colima, Mexico
- Opened: October 16, 1973
- Time zone: CST (UTC-06:00)
- Elevation AMSL: 9 m (30 ft)
- Coordinates: 19°08′41″N 104°33′31″W
- Website: www.aeropuertosgap.com.mx/en/manzanillo-3.html

Map
- Location of the airport in Colima ZLO (Mexico)

Runways
Direction	Length		Surface
Direction	m	ft	Surface
10/28	2,200	7,218	Asphalt

Statistics (2025)
- Total passengers: 231,200
- Ranking in Mexico: 46th ▼2
- Source: Grupo Aeroportuario del Pacífico

Manzanillo International Airport (Spanish: Aeropuerto Internacional de Manzanillo); officially Aeropuerto Internacional Playa de Oro (Playa de Oro International Airport) (IATA: ZLO, ICAO: MMZO) is an international airport located in Manzanillo, Colima, Mexico. It manages domestic and international air traffic for the state of Colima and southern Jalisco, serving as an international gateway to the Mexican tourist destination of Manzanillo. Owned by Grupo Aeroportuario del Pacífico, the airport is named after the neighboring Playa de Oro ("Gold Beach"), itself named for the gold lost in the 1862 wreck of the SS Golden Gate. In 2024, it handled 208,400 passengers, increasing to 231,200 in 2025.

== History ==
Planning for a new international airport began in the late 1960s, driven by the development of the Las Hadas resort by Bolivian investor Antenor Patiño and the need for improved air access to the growing port of Manzanillo. The existing airfield at Salagua could only accommodate DC-3 aircraft and was surrounded by hills that posed safety concerns.

The airport was inaugurated on 16 October 1973 by President Luis Echeverría Álvarez, with Governor Pablo Silva García in attendance. Construction cost 70 million pesos, partly financed by Patiño. Commercial service by Aeroméxico began the previous day, initially using Hawker Siddeley HS 748 turboprops on flights 124 and 125 to Mexico City, with plans to upgrade to Douglas DC-9 jet service.

== Facilities ==
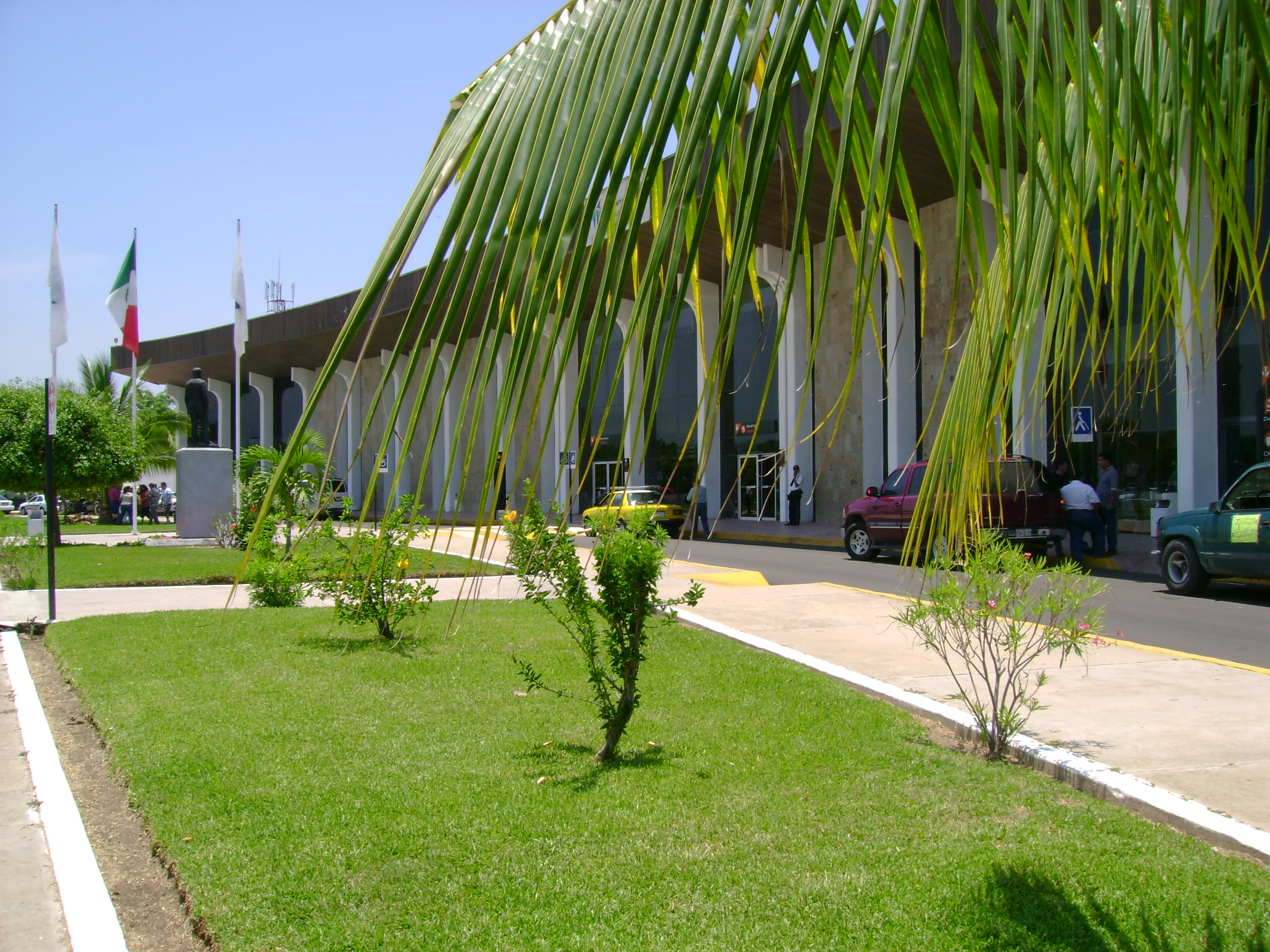
Terminal main entrance

The airport is west of the city of Manzanillo, adjacent to the Pacific coast and near the limits with the state of Jalisco. It is situated at an elevation of 9 metres (30 ft) above mean sea level. The airport has one runway designated as 10/28 with an asphalt surface measuring 2,200 metres (7,200 ft) and the capacity to accommodate narrow-body aircraft. The apron has four stands for narrow-body aircraft.

The passenger terminal, covering an area of 4,700 square metres (51,000 sq ft), houses both arrival and departure facilities for domestic and international flights. The terminal can handle 470 passengers per hour and offers typical services found at a regional airport, including check-in counters for domestic and international flights, car rental services (Alamo, Budget, Sixt, and Thrifty), taxi stands, and a departure concourse with four gates providing direct access to the apron, enabling passengers to board their planes by walking to the aircraft.

Additionally, the airport accommodates logistics and courier companies and features a dedicated general aviation terminal that supports various activities such as tourism, flight training, executive aviation, and general aviation.

== Airlines and destinations ==
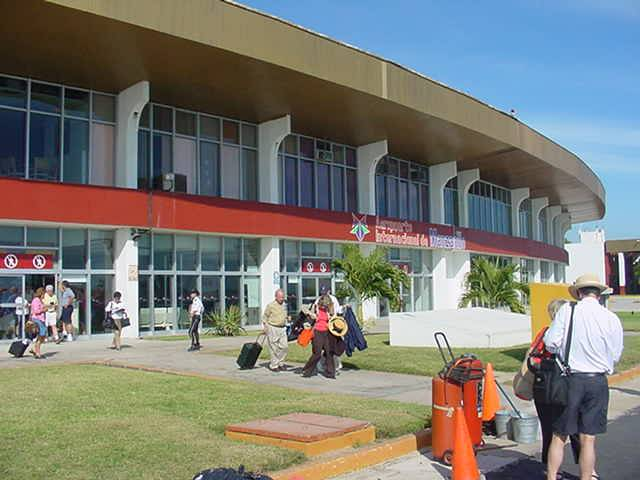
Passenger terminal airside

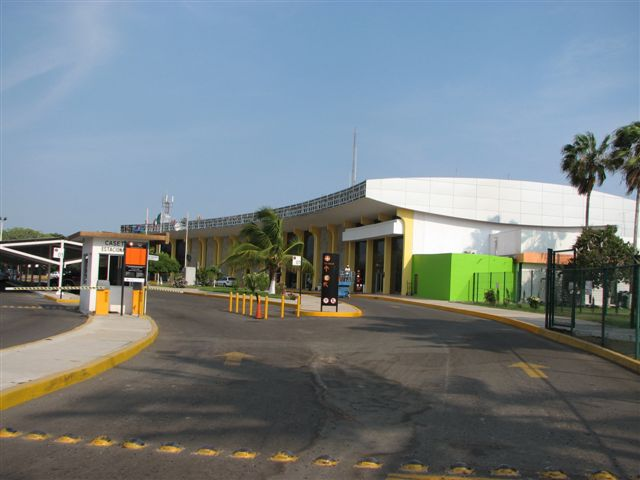
Terminal main entrance

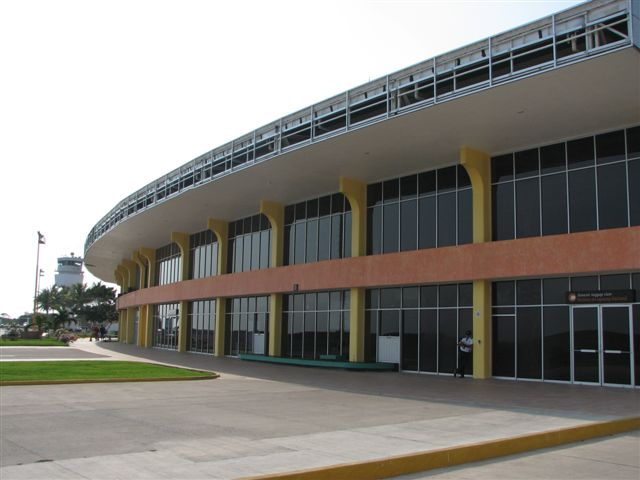
Passenger terminal airside

=== Passenger ===
Airlines	Destinations
Aeroméxico	Mexico City–Benito Juárez
Aeroméxico Connect	Mexico City–Benito Juárez
Alaska Airlines	Los Angeles
American Eagle	Seasonal: Dallas/Fort Worth, Phoenix–Sky Harbor
United Express	Seasonal: Houston–Intercontinental
Viva	Mexico City–Felipe Ángeles
WestJet	Seasonal: Calgary

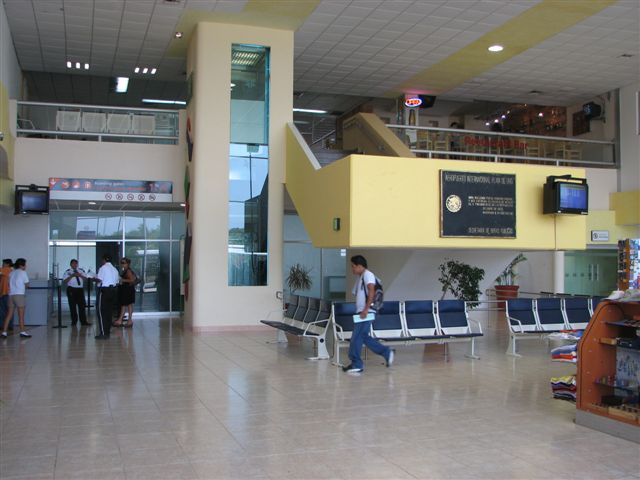
Terminal main hall

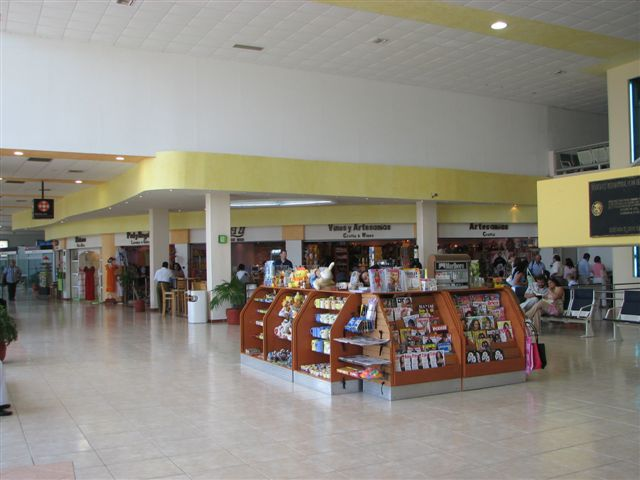
Terminal main hall

Destinations map
International destinations from Manzanillo International Airport
Red = Year-round destination
Blue = Future destination
Green = Seasonal destination

== Statistics ==
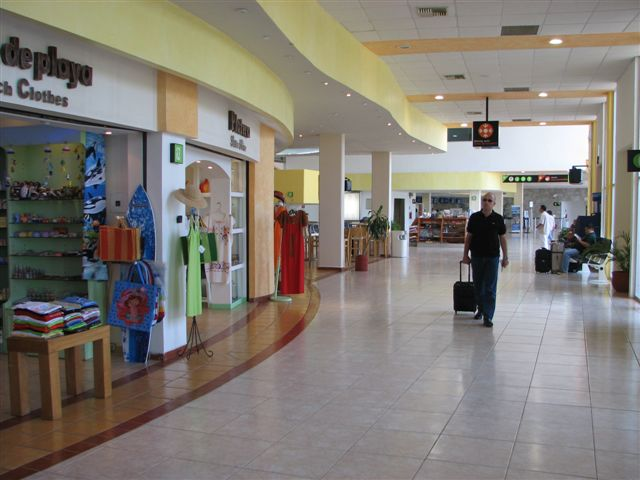
Terminal arrivals hall

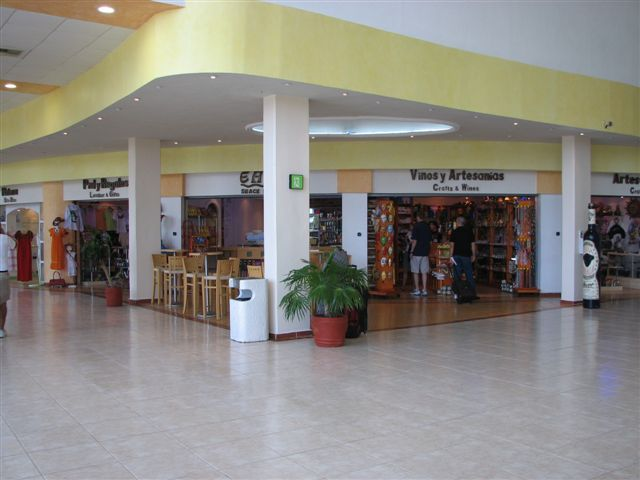
Terminal main hall

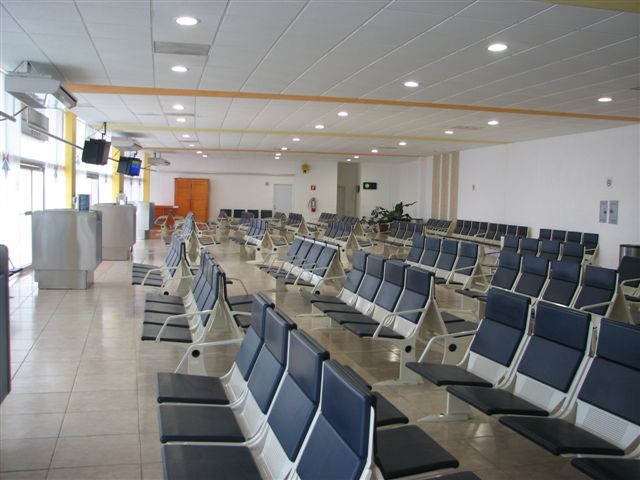
Departures concourse

=== Annual Traffic ===
Passenger statistics at ZLO
Year	Total Passengers	change %
2006	222,094	Steady
2007	237,758	▲7.05%
2008	207,623	▼12.67%
2009	168,449	▼18.86%
2010	150,666	▼10.55%
2011	141,431	▼6.13%
2012	130,259	▼7.90%
2013	168,613	▲29.44%
2014	196,084	▲16.29%
2015	169,485	▼13.56%
2016	174,394	▲2.90%
2017	176,263	▲1.07%
2018	166,053	▼5.79%
2019	169,064	▲1.81%
2020	79,798	▼52.80%
2021	126,175	▲58.12%
2022	158,133	▲25.33%
2023	172,212	▲8.90%
2024	218,400	▲21.0%
2025	231,200	▲5.9%

=== Busiest routes ===
Busiest routes at ZLO (Jan–Dec 2025)
Rank	Airport	Passengers
1	Mexico City, Mexico City	70,454
2	Los Angeles, United States	22,788
3	Calgary, Canada	8,922
4	Dallas/Fort Worth, United States	2,223
5	Houston–Intercontinental, United States	1,999
6	Phoenix–Sky Harbor, United States	1,686
7	Atlanta, United States	924

== See also ==
- List of the busiest airports in Mexico
- List of airports in Mexico
- List of airports by ICAO code: M
- List of busiest airports in North America
- List of the busiest airports in Latin America
- Transportation in Mexico
- Tourism in Mexico
- Grupo Aeroportuario del Pacífico
- List of beaches in Mexico
