= Bajío International Airport =

International airport serving León, Guanajuato, Mexico

León/Bajío International Airport Aeropuerto Internacional del Bajío
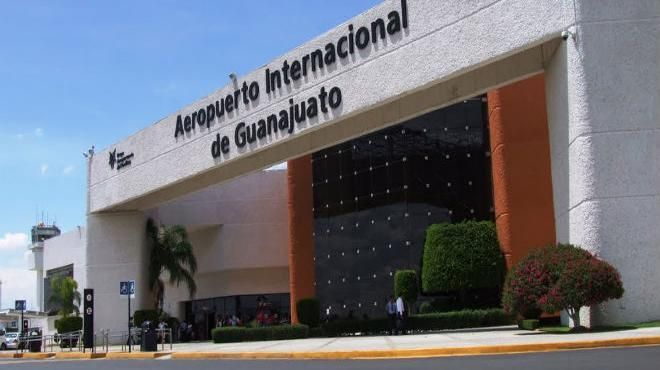
- IATA: BJX; ICAO: MMLO

Summary
- Airport type: Public
- Owner/Operator: Grupo Aeroportuario del Pacífico
- Serves: León, Guanajuato, Mexico
- Location: Silao, Guanajuato, Mexico
- Focus city for: Volaris
- Time zone: CST (UTC−06:00)
- Elevation AMSL: 1,815 m (5,955 ft)
- Coordinates: 20°59′36″N 101°28′51″W
- Website: www.aeropuertosgap.com.mx/en/guanajuato-3.html

Map
- Location of the airport in Guanajuato BJX (Mexico)

Runways
Direction	Length		Surface
Direction	m	ft	Surface
13/31	3,499	11,480	Asphalt

Statistics (2025)
- Total passengers: 3,301,500
- Ranking in Mexico: 10th
- Source: Grupo Aeroportuario del Pacífico

León/Bajio International Airport (Spanish: Aeropuerto Internacional de León/Bajío); officially Aeropuerto Internacional de Guanajuato (Guanajuato International Airport) (IATA: BJX, ICAO: MMLO), is an international airport situated in Silao, Guanajuato, Mexico. It is the main international airport serving the Greater León Metropolitan Area and the State of Guanajuato, which is home to a population of 6 million residents, including the cities of Celaya, Guanajuato, Irapuato, Salamanca, and San Miguel de Allende. In addition to offering domestic flights within Mexico, it serves as a gateway for international travel, connecting Central Mexico to various destinations in the United States. It serves as a focus city for Volaris and supports flight training, cargo, logistics and general aviation activities.

Operated by Grupo Aeroportuario del Pacífico (GAP), Bajío Airport derives its name from the cultural region "El Bajío" (the lowland), which is situated within the central Mexican plateau. It ranks as the ninth-busiest airport in Mexico in terms of passenger numbers and the seventh-busiest for international passenger traffic. In 2024, the airport served 3,169,000 passengers, a figure that increased to 3,301,500 in 2025, marking a 4.2% growth compared to the previous year and becoming the tenth airport in Mexico to surpass three million passengers in a calendar year.

== History ==
The airport was inaugurated in 1991 by President Carlos Salinas de Gortari, replacing the former San Carlos International Airport located in León. The growing industrial activity in the Bajío region and the massive migration of Mexicans to the United States in recent decades has been reflected in a substantial increase in international air transport demand. In 1999 the terminal went through an expansion project, improving equipment, and enhancing services for passengers. In February 2001, this airport received Air Force One during President George W. Bush's visit to Mexico. On March 23, 2012, the airport welcomed Pope Benedict XVI, who arrived on a direct flight from Rome, Italy, during his first and only visit to Mexico.

At the end of 2015, work began on the construction of a parallel taxiway along the entire length of the runway. In August 2016, the airport opened its first and only VIP lounge, while modernization and expansion work in the departure area and the entire terminal began, including the relocation of the customs and immigration checkpoint. Work was completed in mid-2018. Throughout its history, the airport has been served by various airlines, including Aeromar, Aviacsa, Calafia Airlines, Delta Air Lines, Delta Connection, Interjet, Mexicana, TAESA, and TAR Aerolíneas.

== Facilities ==
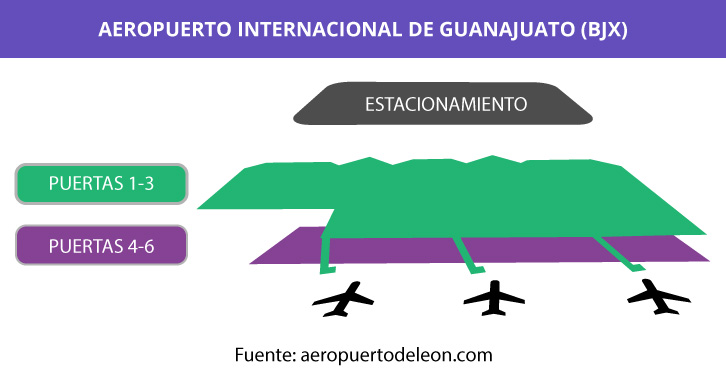
Passenger terminal map

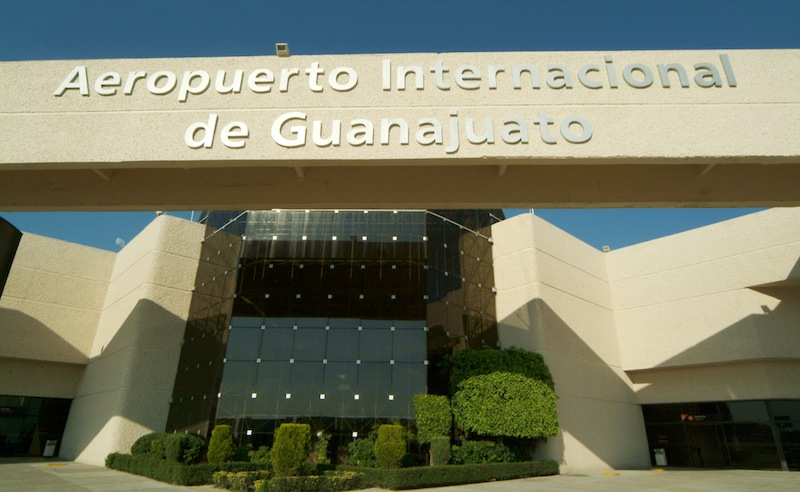
Passenger terminal entrance

The airport is located between the cities of León and Silao in Guanajuato, at an elevation of 1,815 metres (5,955 ft) above mean sea level. It has a single runway, designated as 13/31, with a length of 3,500 metres (11,500 ft) and an asphalt surface. The commercial aviation apron provides nine stands for receiving narrow-body aircraft. The general aviation apron offers stands for fixed-wing aircraft, in addition to heliports for private aviation. The airport also includes a cargo area called "Puerto Interior," which connects the airport with a freight rail and motor transportation hub. It is equipped to handle up to 26 flights per hour.

The passenger terminal accommodates both arrivals and departures for domestic and international flights. The ground floor houses the arrivals area with customs and immigration facilities, the baggage claim area, and the departures section that includes a check-in area, a security checkpoint, and a departures concourse with gates 4-6 that provide direct access to the apron, enabling passengers to walk to their aircraft. From this departure concourse, access to the upper floor is available, which houses snack bars, souvenir shops, and gates 1 to 3, which are equipped with jet bridges for boarding.

Bajío Airport currently lacks direct public transportation services, requiring travelers to use other transport options. The airport provides both short-term and long-term parking facilities. Car rental services are available on-site, with rental counters for Hertz, Budget, Veico, and City Car Rental located in the arrivals hall.

For intercity bus travel, Primera Plus and Unebus offer services to various destinations including León, San Miguel de Allende, Silao, Guanajuato, Purísima del Rincón, and San Francisco del Rincón. From León, passengers can connect to various destinations across Mexico. Advanced bookings can be made through shuttle services listed on local tourist websites, such as Viva, Primera Plus, and Unebus.

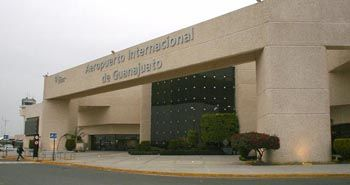
Passenger terminal entrance

== Airlines and destinations ==
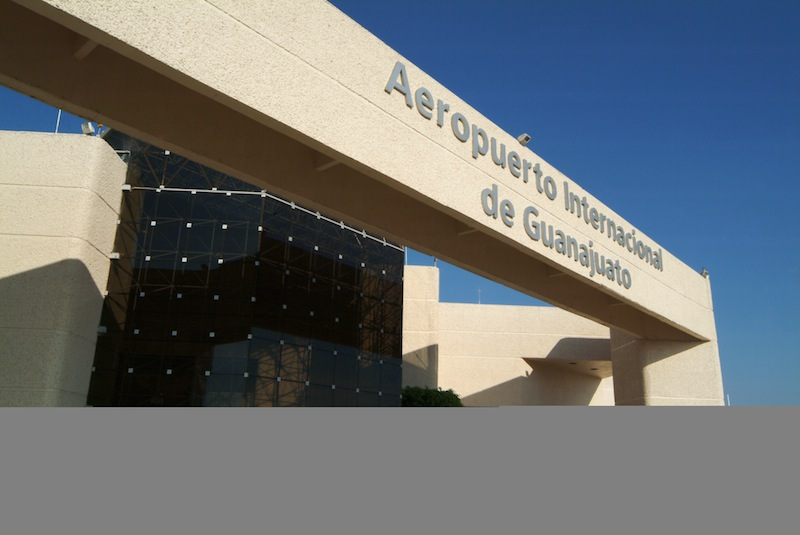
Passenger terminal entrance

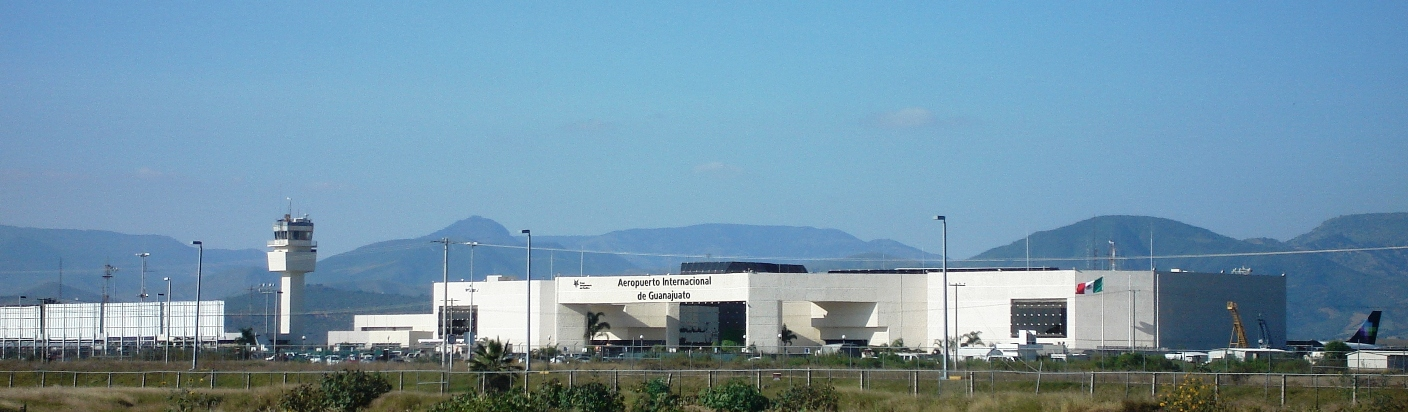
Airport view from Highway 45D

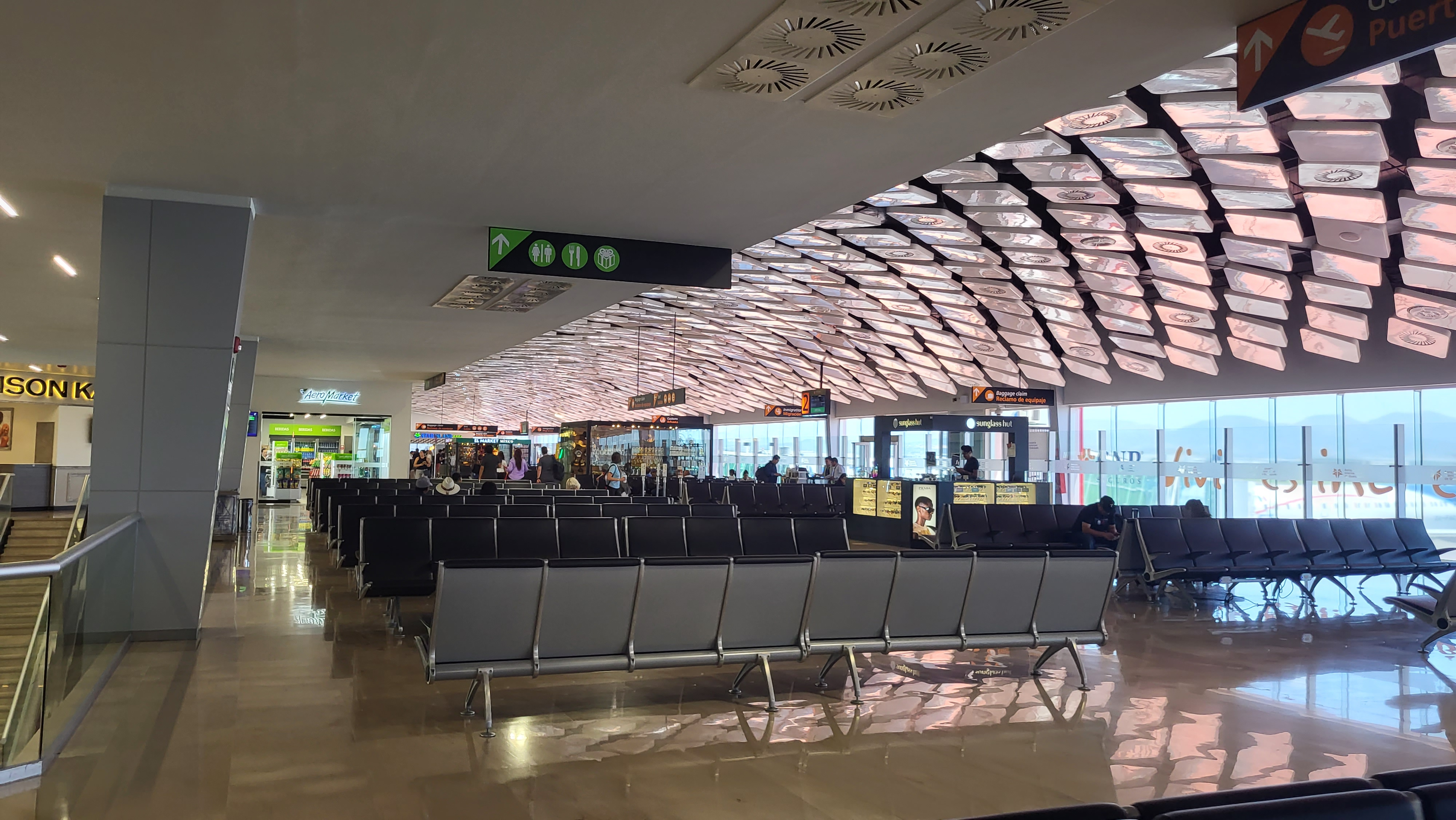
Departures concourse

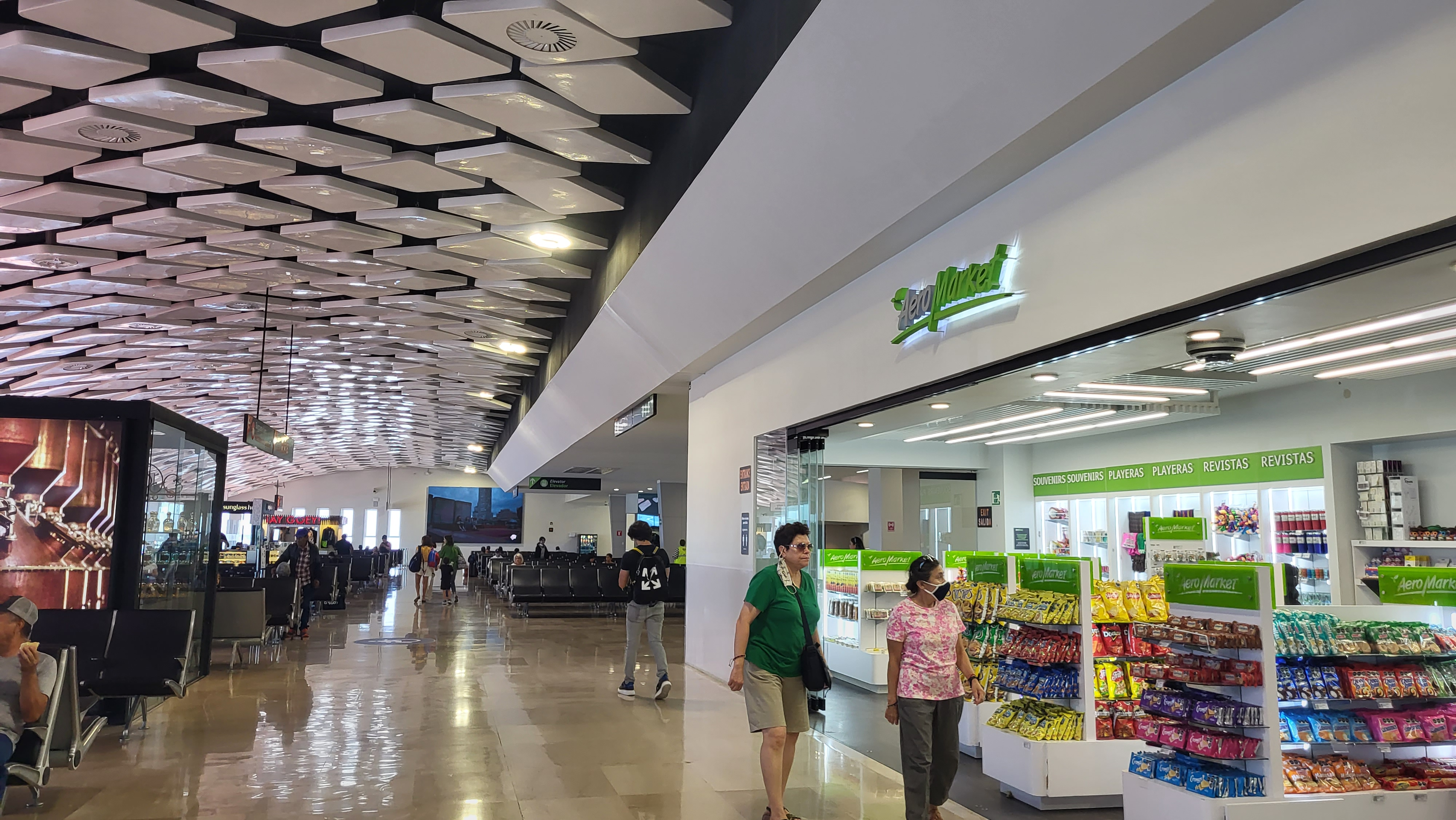
Departures concourse

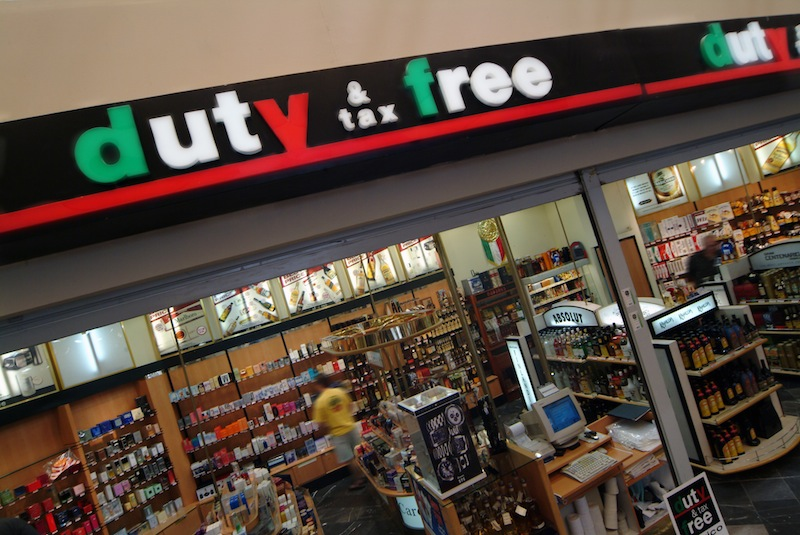
Duty-free shop

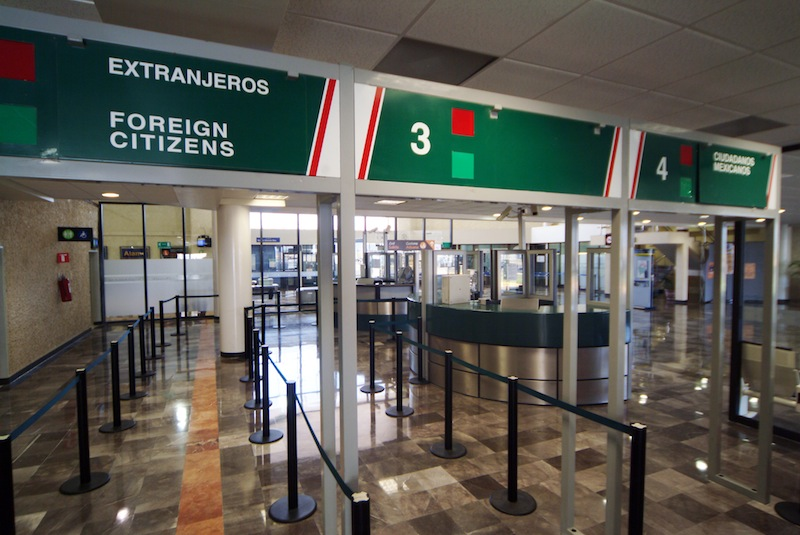
Passport control area

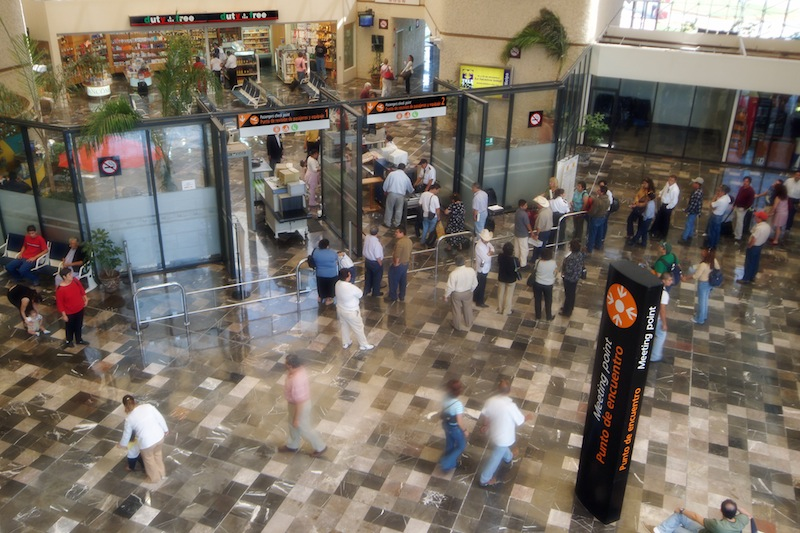
Security area

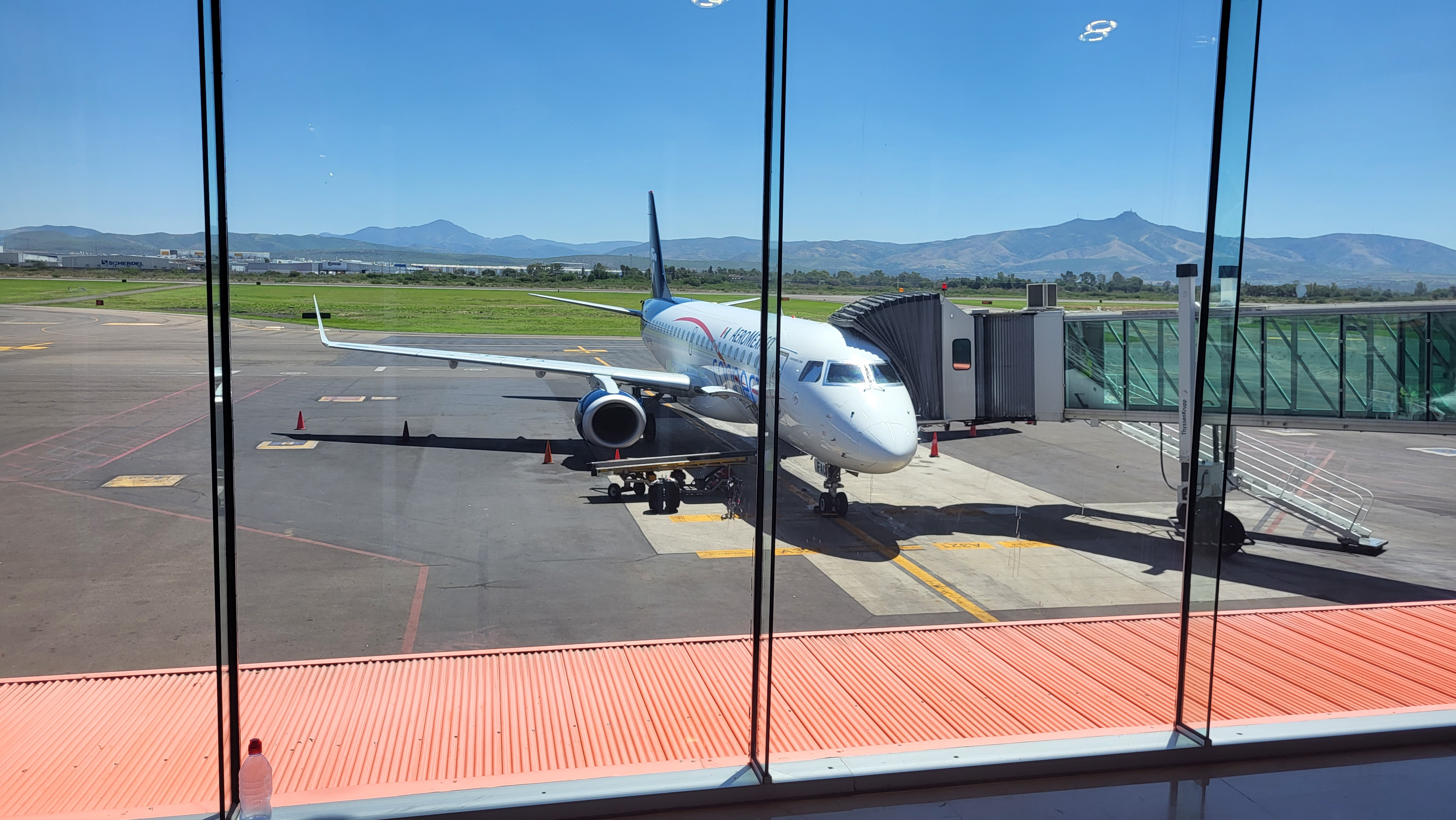
Aeromexico Connect Embraer E190 at BJX

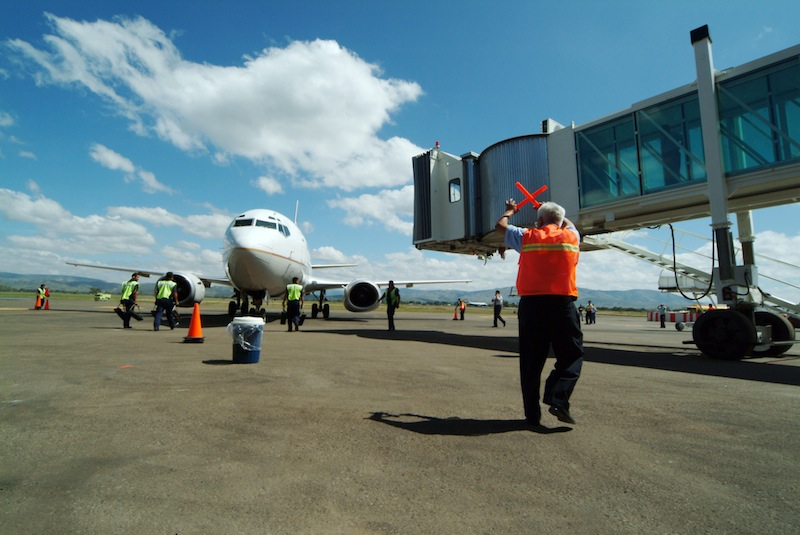
Continental Airlines Boeing 737 at BJX

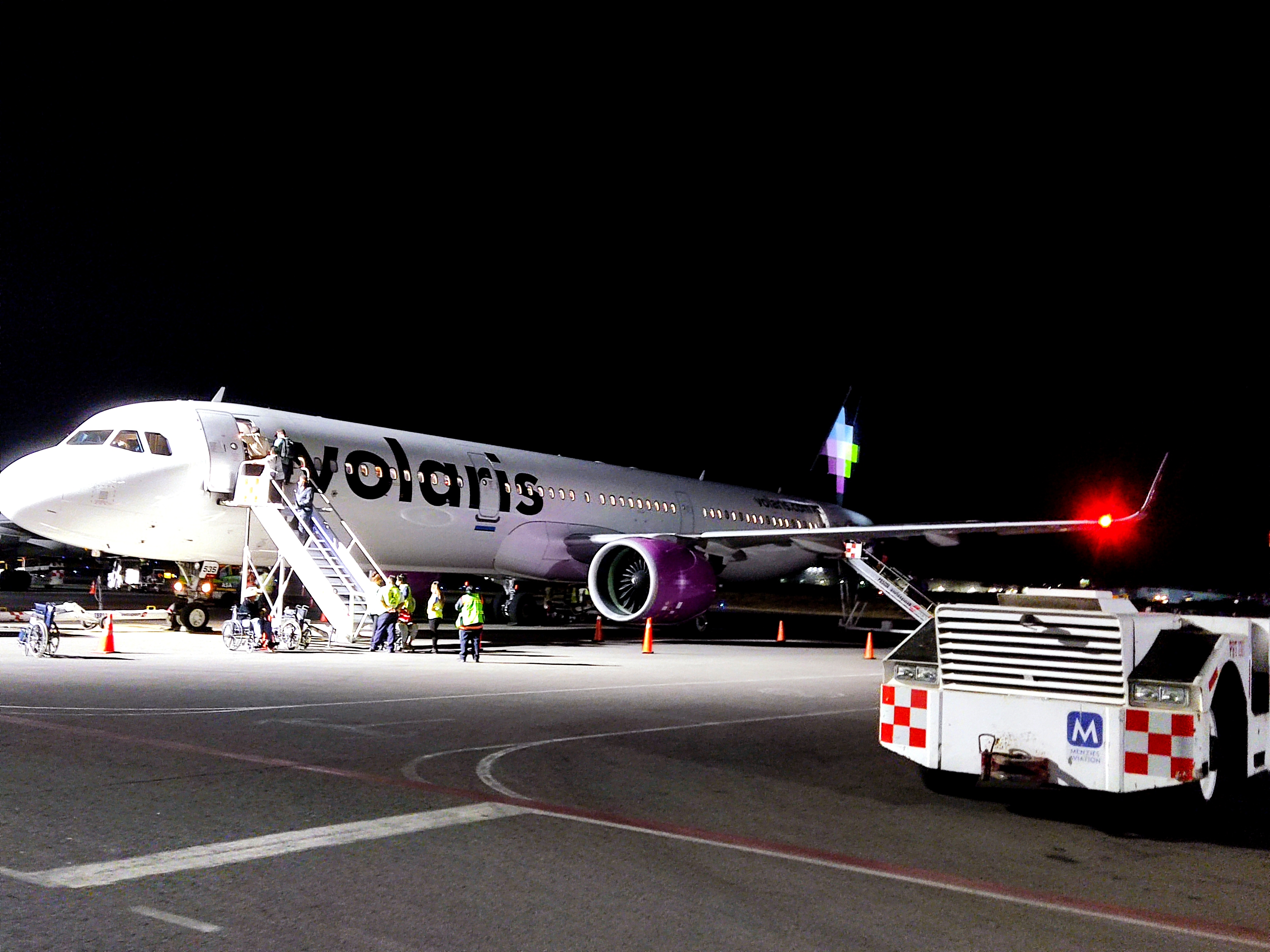
Volaris Airbus A321-271N at BJX

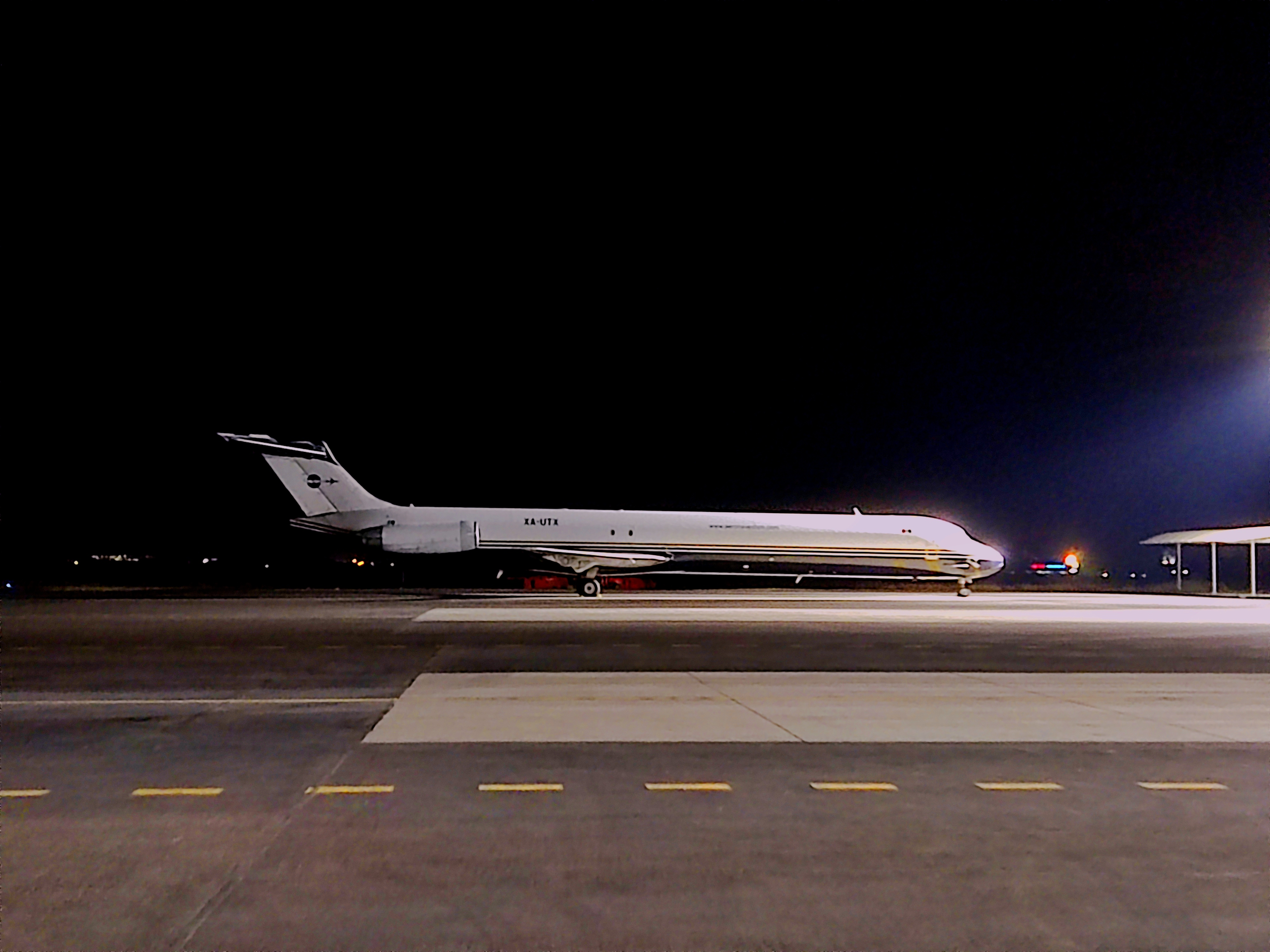
Aeronaves TSM MD-82(SF) (XA-UTX) at BJX

=== Passenger ===
Airlines	Destinations
Aeroméxico	Mexico City–Benito Juárez
Aeroméxico Connect	Atlanta, Mexico City–Benito Juárez
American Airlines	Dallas/Fort Worth
American Eagle	Seasonal: Dallas/Fort Worth
Flair Airlines	Seasonal: Vancouver
Mexicana de Aviación	Mexico City–Felipe Ángeles
United Airlines	Houston–Intercontinental
United Express	Houston–Intercontinental
Viva	Cancún, Chicago–O'Hare, Ciudad Juárez, Dallas/Fort Worth, Houston–Intercontinental, Mérida, Mexico City–Felipe Ángeles, Monterrey, San Antonio, Tijuana
Volaris	Cancún, Chicago–O'Hare, Chicago–Midway, Fresno, Los Angeles, Mexicali, Monterrey, Oakland, Ontario, Puerto Vallarta, Sacramento, San José del Cabo, Tijuana

=== Destination maps ===
Domestic destinations from León/Bajío International Airport
Red = Year-round destination
Blue = Future destination
Green = Seasonal destination
International destinations from Bajío International Airport
Red = Year-round destination
Blue = Future destination
Green = Seasonal/charter destination
Italic = Suspended passenger destination

== Statistics ==
=== Annual traffic ===
Passenger statistics at Bajío International Airport
Year	Total passengers	Change %
2008	1,102,800	Steady
2009	886,100	▼19.65%
2010	853,800	▼3.5%
2011	854,200	▲0.50%
2012	950,300	▲11.30%
2013	998,100	▲5.02%
2014	1,222,100	▲22.44%
2015	1,492,100	▲22.09%
2016	1,711,400	▲16.19%
2017	1,955,600	▲14.30%
2018	2,323,772	▲19.76%
2019	2,746,824	▲18.21%
2020	1,387,700	▼49.6%
2021	2,119,000	▲52.7%
2022	2,581,976	▲23.1%
2023	3,195,946	▲23.8%
2024	3,169,000	▼0.8%
2025	3,301,500	▲4.2%

=== Top destinations ===
Busiest domestic routes from BJX (Jan–Dec 2025)
Rank	City	Passengers
1	Tijuana, Baja California	303,703
2	Monterrey, Nuevo León	238,688
3	Cancún, Quintana Roo	174,824
4	Mexico City, Mexico City	165,634
5	Puerto Vallarta, Jalisco	71,209
6	Ciudad Juárez, Chihuahua	56,492
7	Mexico City–AIFA, State of Mexico	35,779
8	San José del Cabo, Baja Califormia Sur	30,451
9	Mexicali, Baja California	23,721
10	Mérida, Yucatán	23,680

Busiest international routes from BJX (Jan–Dec 2025)
Rank	City	Passengers
1	Dallas/Fort Worth, United States	134,500
2	Houston-Intercontinental, United States	109,144
3	Chicago (O'Hare and Midway, United States) (Note: The official statistics combine both O'Hare and Midway airports.)	69,733
4	Oakland, United States	39,840
5	Los Angeles, United States	32,910
6	Atlanta, United States	27,438
7	Fresno, United States	19,206
8	Sacramento, United States	18,720
9	San Antonio, United States	14,068
10	San Jose (CA), United States	10,847

== Accidents and incidents ==
- On 17 September 2021, a Viva Airbus A320-200, registered XA-VAP, experienced an engine failure shortly after takeoff from El Bajío. The aircraft landed safely after circling the airport and burning fuel for 25 minutes.

== See also ==
- List of the busiest airports in Mexico
- List of airports in Mexico
- List of airports by ICAO code: M
- List of busiest airports in North America
- List of the busiest airports in Latin America
- Transportation in Mexico
- Tourism in Mexico
- Grupo Aeroportuario del Pacífico
- Metropolitan areas of Mexico
- San Miguel de Allende
- Guanajuato (city)
- Festival Internacional Cervantino
