= Tijuana International Airport =

International airport serving Tijuana, Baja California, Mexico

Tijuana International Airport Aeropuerto Internacional General Abelardo L. Rodríguez
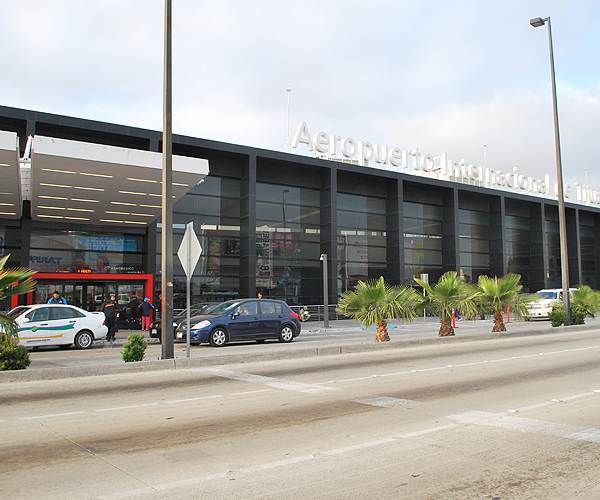
- IATA: TIJ; ICAO: MMTJ

Summary
- Airport type: Public / Military
- Operator: Grupo Aeroportuario del Pacífico
- Serves: San Diego–Tijuana
- Location: Tijuana, Baja California (CBX terminal in Otay Mesa, San Diego, California)
- Opened: May 1, 1951; 75 years ago
- Hub for: Volaris
- Focus city for: Viva
- Time zone: PST (UTC-08:00)
  - Summer (DST): PDT (UTC-07:00)
- Elevation AMSL: 149 m (489 ft)
- Coordinates: 32°32′27″N 116°58′12″W
- Website: www.aeropuertosgap.com.mx/en/tijuana-3.html

Map
- Location of airport in Tijuana TIJ/MMTJ (Baja California) TIJ/MMTJ (Mexico)

Runways
Direction	Length		Surface
Direction	m	ft	Surface
09/27	2,960	9,711	Asphalt
~~10/28~~ (closed)	2,000	6,561	Asphalt

Statistics (2025)
- Total passengers: 12,650,000
- Ranking in Mexico: 5th
- Source: Grupo Aeroportuario del Pacífico

Tijuana International Airport (Spanish: Aeropuerto Internacional de Tijuana; IATA: TIJ, ICAO: MMTJ), officially Aeropuerto Internacional General Abelardo L. Rodríguez (lit. 'General Abelardo L. Rodríguez International Airport'), is an international airport located 5 km (3.1 mi; 2.7 nmi) northeast of downtown Tijuana, Baja California, Mexico. It serves the surrounding San Diego–Tijuana metropolitan area, home to a population of five million.

The airport functions primarily as a domestic gateway, serving a network of 37 domestic destinations. It is a hub for Volaris and a focus city for Viva. Additionally, the airport houses facilities for the Mexican Air Force and supports cargo flights, tourism, flight training, and general aviation. It is the westernmost airport in Mexico and the second-northernmost, after Mexicali International Airport. The airport is operated by Grupo Aeroportuario del Pacífico.

Situated adjacent to the Mexico–United States border, Tijuana Airport is a geographically binational airport, having direct access to its terminal from Mexico and from its Cross Border Xpress (CBX) facility in the United States. This rare feature allows passengers to walk across the border using the CBX pedestrian bridge.

The airport ranks as the fifth busiest in Mexico for both passenger numbers and aircraft movements, and holds the 16th position in Latin America and the 47th in North America. It handled 12,545,800 passengers in 2024 and reached 12,650,000 in 2025, of which 4,018,100 were international passengers using the CBX terminal.

== History ==
=== Early years ===
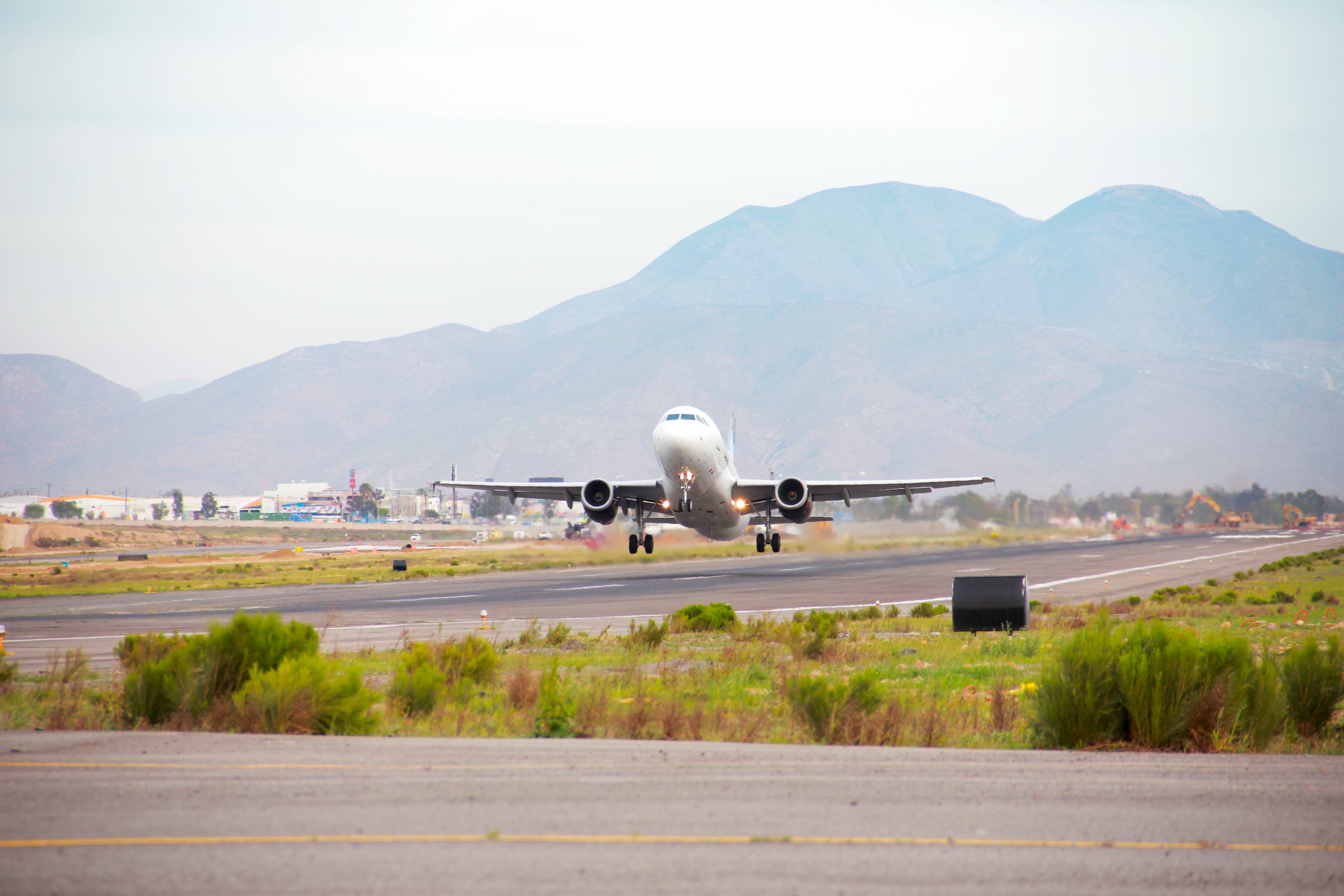
Volaris Airbus A320 departing TIJ

Tijuana Airport, inaugurated as the 'Aeropuerto Federal de Tijuana' on May 1, 1951, replaced the former airport located on today's Agua Caliente Boulevard. The initial passenger terminal was situated on the southwest side of the airport grounds, facing the present terminal. In 1954, Mexicana de Aviación began direct flights from Tijuana to Mexico City. In 1965, as part of the National Plan of Airports introduced during President Díaz Ordaz's administration, the airport became part of the Government-owned corporation Aeropuertos y Servicios Auxiliares (ASA). Tijuana's population growth during the 1960s led to increased flight demand.

The airport's 2,000 metres (6,600 ft) long runway, with an orientation of 10/28, had its northern end located less than 100 metres (330 ft) south of the U.S. border wall. This meant that departing airplanes entered U.S. airspace after takeoff. The year 1969 marked the introduction of Operation Intercept, aimed at curbing narcotics flow between the U.S. and Mexico. Rising political pressure to reduce incursions into U.S. airspace resulted in the requirement to reorient the runway from 10/28 to 09/27.

In 1970, a new 2,500 metres (8,200 ft) long runway (09/27) and a terminal capable of accommodating larger aircraft were constructed north of the existing runway. The new runway direction impacted Tijuana's approach, particularly over Cerro San Isidro, a 792 metres (2,598 ft) high land obstacle, causing an increase in the glide slope on eastern approaches beyond 3 degrees and hindering a full Instrument Landing System (ILS) approach on runway 27, necessary during adverse weather conditions.

The original terminal then transitioned into an air base for the Mexican Air Force, now known as the 'Aeropuerto Viejo' (old airport). During the 1970s, Tijuana experienced rapid growth, leading to expansions in both terminal and parking areas to meet escalating airport demand.

=== Privatization ===
In the 1980s, both terminal space and passenger parking at Tijuana Airport became insufficient to meet demand. In 1990, Mexico initiated its first two 10-year joint ventures with private investors. One of the initial projects involved expanding both the departure concourse and parking areas.

The year 1995 marked a significant change with the publication of the 'Ley de Aeropuertos' (Airports Law) by the Department of Communications and Transportation (Spanish: Secretaría de Comunicaciones y Transportes), marking the beginning of Mexico's airport privatization program. In 1999, Tijuana Airport joined Grupo Aeroportuario del Pacífico (GAP), a consortium headquartered in Guadalajara.

Under the airport privatization concession in 2002, the airport management undertook an expansion project. The extension of concourses A and B allowed for a doubling of the terminal's capacity. Furthermore, several taxiways were expanded to accommodate larger aircraft, such as the Boeing 747.

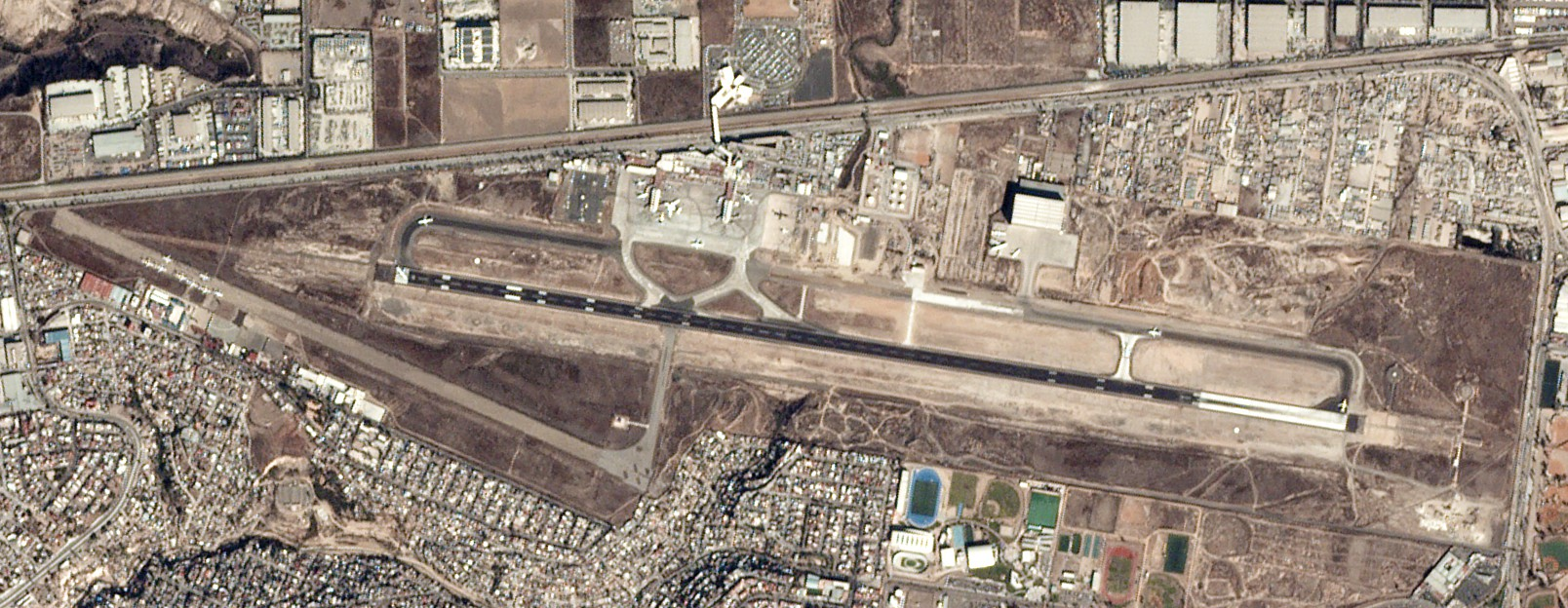
Satellite view of the airport

=== Growth and hub years ===
Throughout its history, Tijuana Airport has served as a strategic hub for various airlines. In the 1990s, up until its discontinuation of services in 2006, Aero California utilized the airport as a hub, offering services to more than 12 domestic cities. Other airlines such as TAESA, Aerolíneas Internacionales, Líneas Aéreas Azteca, and Avolar also established their hubs in Tijuana during the 1990s and early 2000s, operating extensive domestic networks. Notably, Avolar had its maintenance base at a large hangar facility in Tijuana, later acquired by Volaris. Volaris initiated operations in Tijuana in 2006, gradually expanding its services and transforming Tijuana into a hub with connections to more than 35 destinations.

As the airport grew in significance, emerging as one of the country's largest hubs, plans for a new terminal were contemplated, though no tangible progress was made. Between 2011 and 2012, significant renovations occurred in Concourses A and B. These enhancements included new customs and international arrivals facilities and a new bus terminal.

=== Bi-national/International operations ===
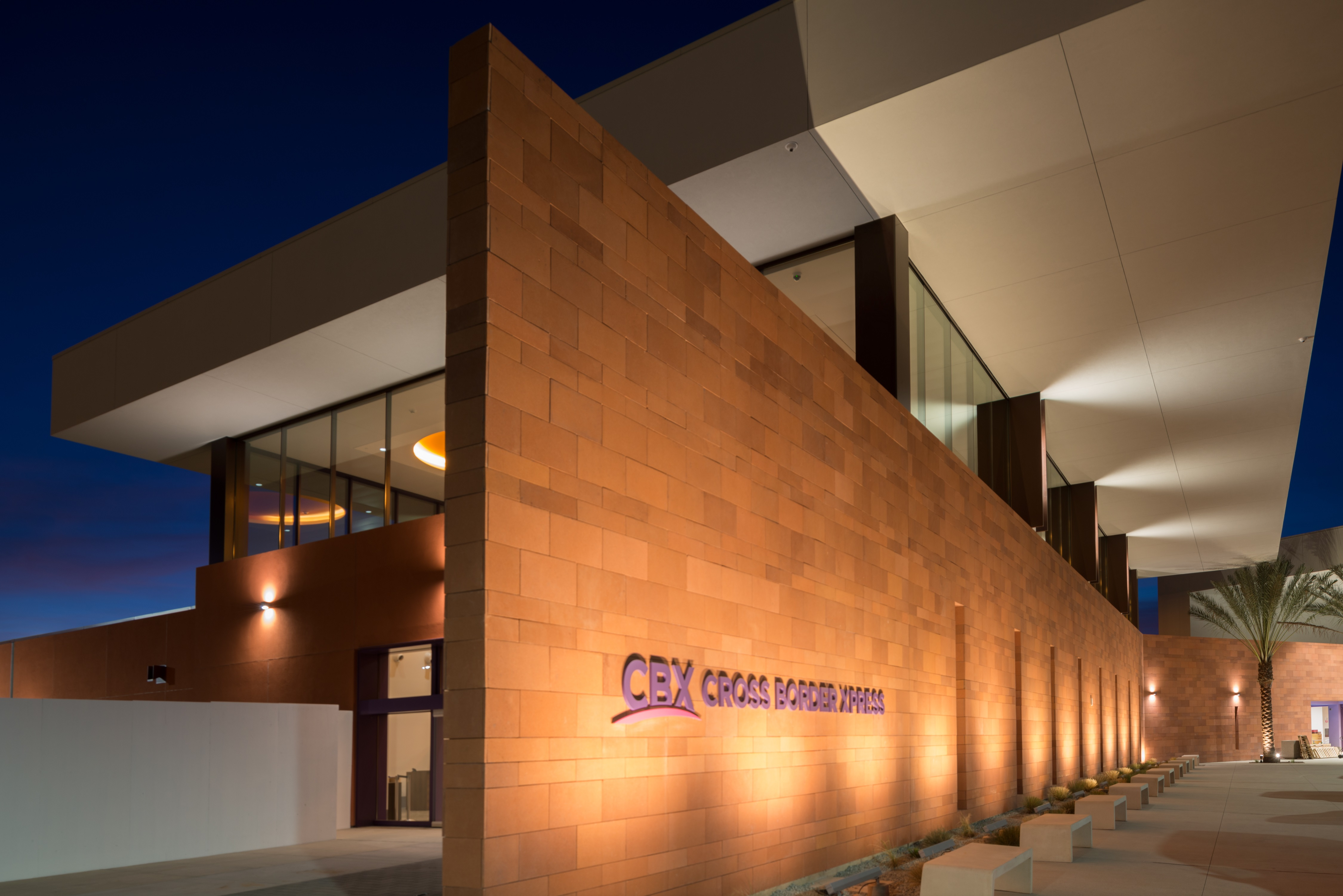
Cross Border Xpress building

On December 9, 2015, the Cross Border Xpress (CBX) opened, linking the passenger terminal in Tijuana with a terminal in San Diego. The facility allows passengers to cross directly between the United States and Mexico through a pedestrian bridge connected to the airport terminal, giving the airport direct access from both sides of the border. The project followed decades of planning and negotiations involving border control, management, funding, and construction.

On the Mexican side, the New Transit Processing Building (NEP; Spanish: Nuevo Edificio Procesador) opened in 2022 as a terminal expansion for cross-border passengers arriving from San Diego through the CBX bridge. The facility includes immigration, customs, airline check-in, and security screening areas, and connects directly with the departures concourse. It also processes the airport's international arrivals.

The airport's proximity to the United States border has made it a departure point for passengers traveling between Southern California and destinations in Mexico. However, competition from nearby San Diego International Airport and taxes applied to international flights in Mexico have limited the airport's international route network. Airport officials stated that the NEP expansion was intended to attract and support additional long-haul service, including routes to Asia and South America.

== Routes evolution ==
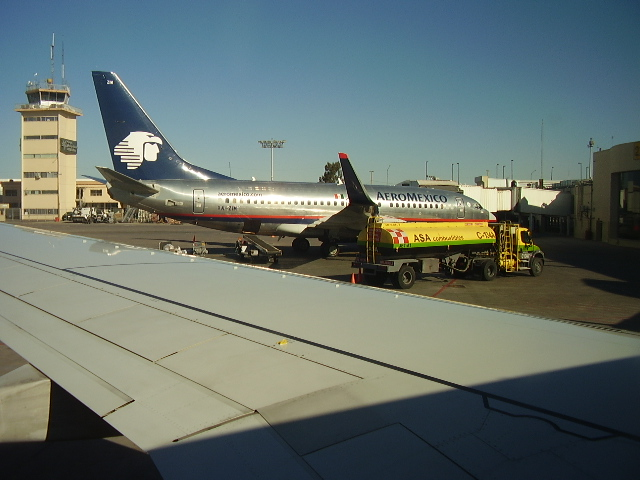
Aeroméxico Boeing 737 at TIJ

In 1954, Mexicana de Aviación introduced direct flights from Tijuana to Mexico City. During the 1970s, cargo airline AeroCarga operated flights from Tijuana to La Paz, Mexico City, and Mérida using Douglas DC-6 aircraft. In 1971, Aeroméxico began flights to Mexico City with Douglas DC-8 aircraft. By 1976, it had expanded its services to Guadalajara using McDonnell Douglas DC-10 equipment. Mexicana reinaugurated its Tijuana flights in 1978, operating a daily flight from Mexico City with a stop in La Paz, using Boeing 727 equipment.

In 1983, Aero California launched the Tijuana-Los Mochis-Guadalajara route with McDonnell Douglas DC-9 jets. Mexicana inaugurated the Guadalajara route in 1985, operating Boeing 727 and 757 aircraft, as well as Airbus A318, A319, and A320 aircraft, over a span of 25 years. In the summer of 1987, Aeroméxico introduced flights to Bogotá, Colombia, operating Douglas DC-8-62 equipment four days a week. In 1988, Aeroméxico declared bankruptcy and underwent restructuring, which impacted its services in Tijuana. In 1991, TAESA initiated flights to Mexico City with a stop in Los Mochis, employing Boeing 727 equipment.

In 2006, Aeroméxico launched the Tijuana-Acapulco route, using Boeing 737-700 aircraft. That same year, Líneas Aéreas Azteca initiated flights to Oakland and Viva began operations in Tijuana from its Monterrey hub, operating Boeing 737-300 equipment. Interjet introduced flights to Mexico City in 2008. In 2009, Mexicana closed routes to Culiacán and Puebla, and ultimately declared bankruptcy in 2010.

From 2006 to 2014, Aeroméxico operated three weekly flights to Tokyo-Narita using Boeing 777-200, before relocating the route to Monterrey. Additionally, Aeroméxico operated flights to Shanghai from 2006 to 2009 and 2010 to 2019. In 2012, regional airline Calafia Airlines initiated bi-weekly flights to Tijuana, operating the Tijuana–Loreto–La Paz route. Viva temporarily suspended its operations in Tijuana in 2014. Interjet started operations on the Tijuana-Acapulco route in 2015, using the Sukhoi Superjet 100. On March 4, 2015, Volaris resumed the Tijuana–Oakland route with two weekly flights, a reduced frequency from its original daily service launched in August 2009 but later canceled due to poor performance.

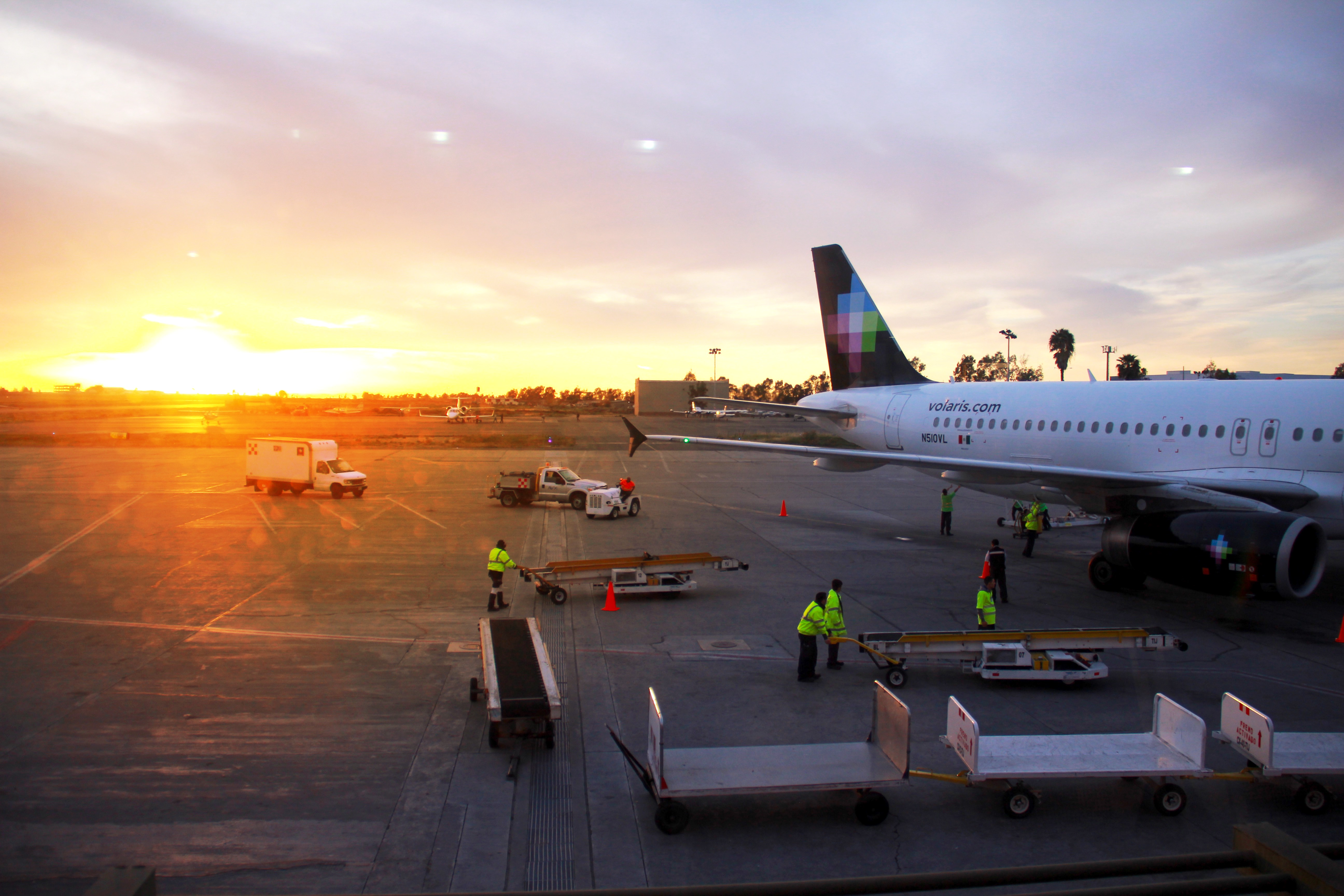
Volaris Airbus A320 at TIJ

On October 1, 2015, Aeroméxico Connect resumed flights from Tijuana to Monterrey, operated by the Embraer 170. Viva also resumed its flights in Tijuana on November 19, 2015, with Mexico City as its first route, marking the beginning of its current role as an operating base and focus city.

From 2017 to 2018, Volaris Costa Rica initiated flights to San Salvador and Guatemala City. In 2018, the Chinese airline Hainan Airlines commenced three weekly flights from Beijing to Tijuana and onward to Mexico City using Boeing 787-8 equipment. This service was suspended in 2020 due to the COVID-19 pandemic. Interjet also ceased all operations in Tijuana that year after filing for bankruptcy and becoming defunct.

From 2020 to 2023, the airport had no international service due to the pandemic imposing heavier restrictions on air travel. After international travel restrictions were lifted, service resumed on February 15, 2024, with American Eagle launching daily flights to Phoenix, Arizona, using Embraer E175 aircraft. As of 2025, the route operates with CRJ-700 equipment and still operates flights daily except Tuesdays and Wednesdays. On December 26, 2023, newly incorporated state-owned airline Mexicana de Aviación commenced daily flights to Tijuana using Boeing 737 equipment from the Mexican Air Force. The airline initially operated two daily flights, but one was later discontinued.

On May 11, 2024, China Southern Airlines launched the bi-weekly Shenzhen-Mexico City route, using Airbus A350 equipment. The flight departs from Shenzhen and flies directly to Mexico City's busiest airport, making a brief stop at Tijuana's airport as a refueling layover on its return leg to Shenzhen. Since this is a layover, not an official direct connection to the airport, passengers at the terminal are not allowed to board the aircraft, nor make flight connections.

On July 12, 2024, after a four-year hiatus, Hainan Airlines restored its thrice-weekly Beijing–Tijuana–Mexico City–Tijuana–Beijing route using the same Boeing 787-8 equipment it used to operate before the COVID-19 pandemic. This marked the resumption of direct passenger service to Asia, making it the only passenger connection to China in the San Diego–Tijuana metropolitan area. Volaris briefly operated direct flights to Las Vegas, beginning on October 29, 2024. The route ran three times a week before being discontinued in 2025.

Volaris remains the largest operator in the airport, offering flights to 35 domestic destinations. Additionally, both Volaris and Viva serve the longest domestic nonstop route in Mexico, from Tijuana to Cancún, with a flight time of over four hours.

== Facilities ==
Terminal layout

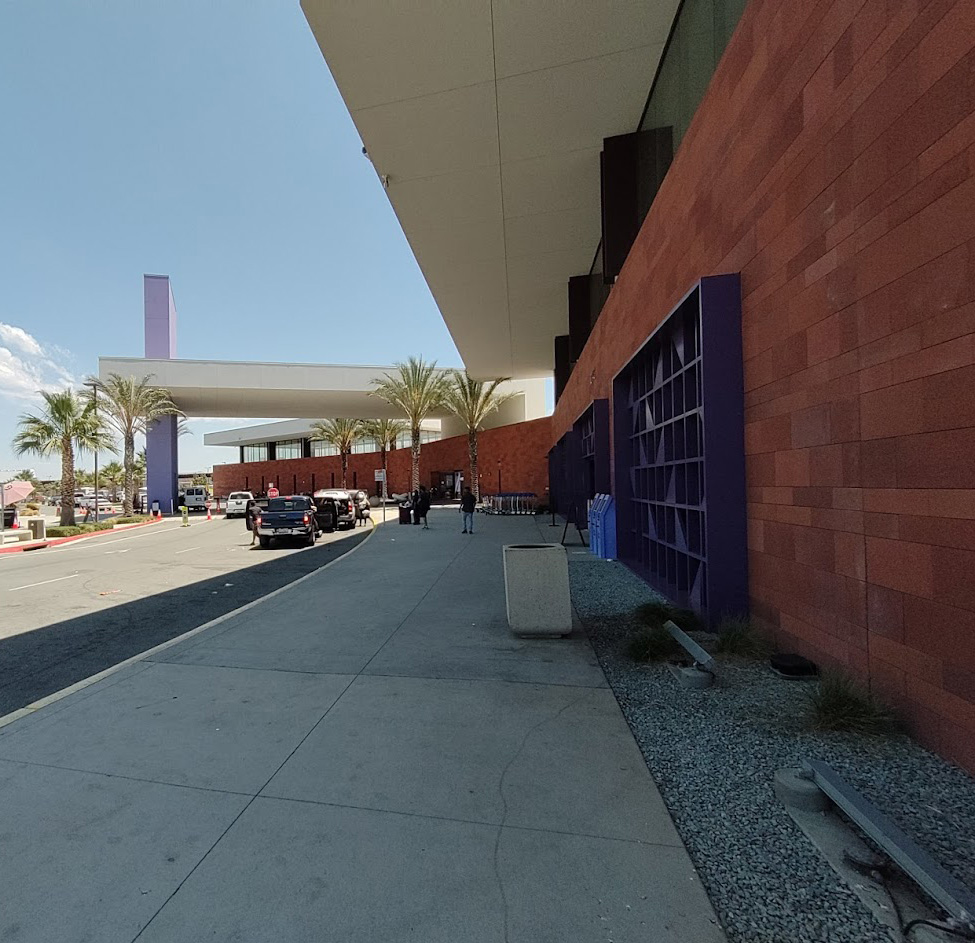
CBX terminal entrance

The airport features Runway 09/27, measuring 3,000 metres (9,800 ft), a parallel taxiway, and an apron with 27 parking positions—12 contact stands and 15 remote positions—primarily for narrow-body commercial aircraft, located around the two terminal pier buildings. Adjacent to this area, there is a general aviation apron offering stands for fixed-wing aircraft and helipads for private aviation, as well as hangars and maintenance facilities. The airport's control tower is one of the tallest in Mexico.

On the opposite side of the Main Terminal building, there is the Old Airport Terminal and an adjacent decommissioned runway. The Old Airport Terminal houses military facilities, and south of the former runway are four remote stands, primarily used by cargo aircraft. These are linked by a shorter taxiway to the main runway. The airport also accommodates general aviation through the General Aviation Building (GAB).

Runway 09/27 runs east to west approximately 300 metres (980 ft) south of the U.S.–Mexico border. The approach to the runway is either from the east (normally) or from the west (when Santa Ana wind conditions exist). Due to prevailing winds, Runway 27 is the airport's primary approach path. The airport can handle up to 10 million passengers per year and 360 flights per day, and is capable of accommodating wide-body aircraft, including the Boeing 787 and 747.

=== Passenger terminal ===
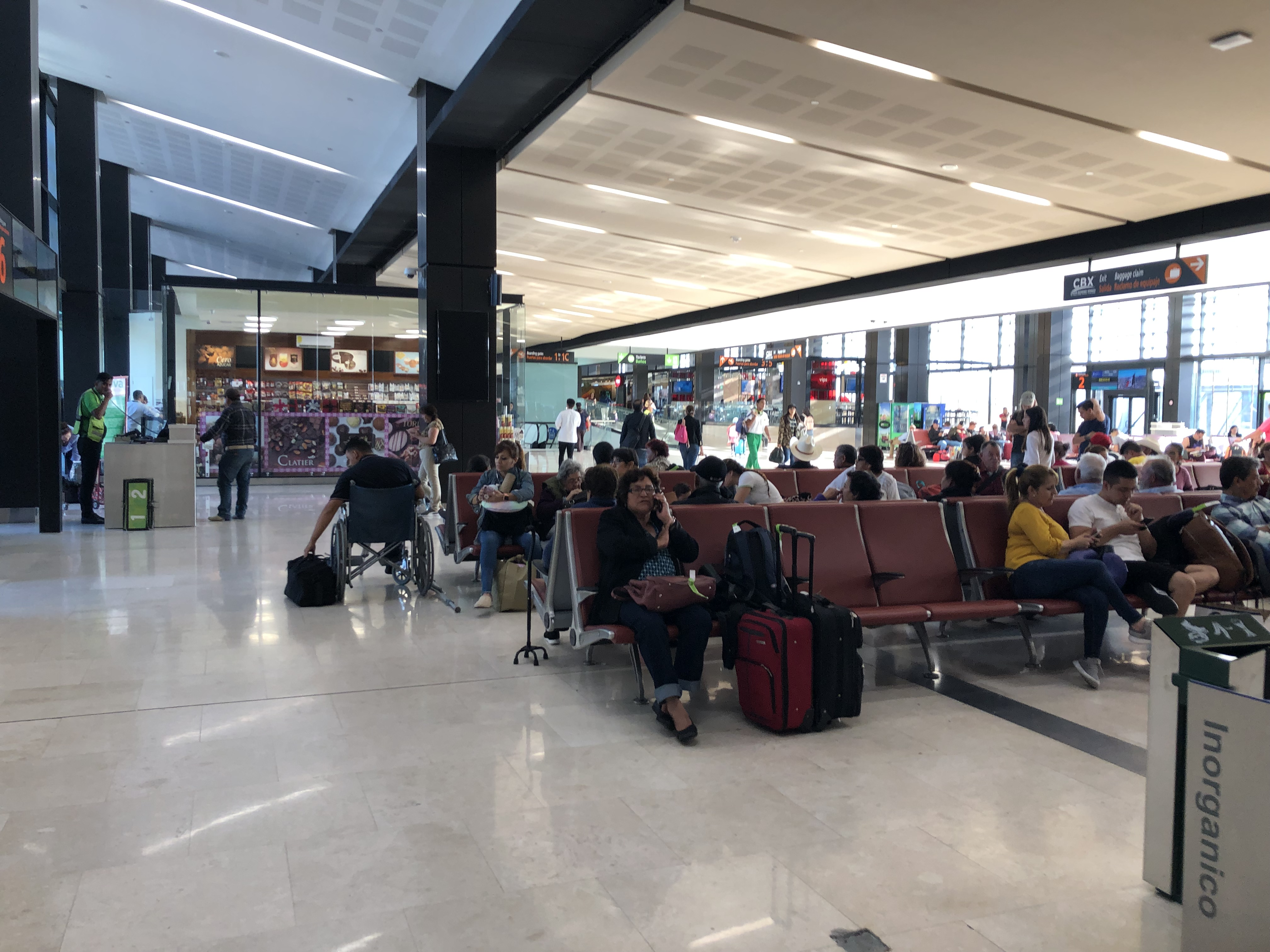
Concourse A

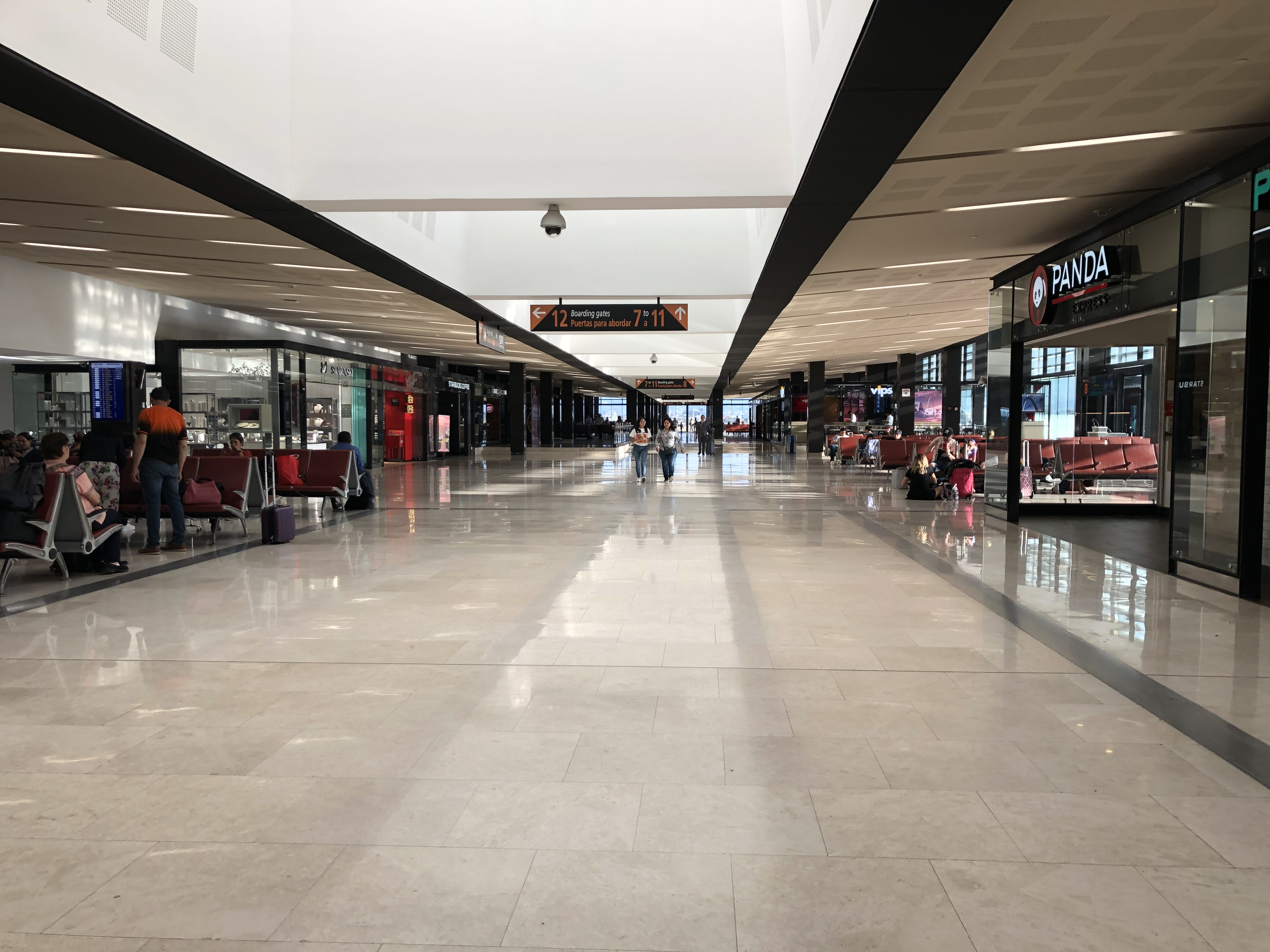
Concourse A

The passenger terminal accommodates both arrival and departure services for domestic and international flights within a multi-story building, including two pier concourses with 20 gates. The ground floor of the main building includes check-in areas and an arrivals hall. Here, passengers can access car rental agencies, taxi ranks, food outlets, and souvenir shops.

The first floor houses the main hall, which features a security checkpoint and an airside corridor leading to Concourses A and B. This zone is equipped with food outlets, a duty-free store, and a VIP lounge. The gates are located in two piers, designated A and B, which are connected to the main terminal. It is designed so that international flights can be handled at Concourse B and domestic flights at both concourses. Additionally, gates 19 and 20 are located at the east end of the terminal, where passengers board their aircraft directly from the apron.

Concourse A serves domestic flights and features seating areas with shops and food stands. It has nine gates: gates 1-5 are located on the top floor and are equipped with jet bridges, while gates 6-9 are located on the ground floor, where passengers board their aircraft via remote stands. Airlines operating from Concourse A include Aeromexico, Mexicana, Viva, and Volaris.

Concourse B serves domestic and international flights. It mirrors Concourse A in layout, with food stands and duty-free shops. This concourse features eight gates: gates 10-14 are located on the top floor and are equipped with jet bridges, while gates 15-18 are located on the ground floor, where passengers board their aircraft via remote stands. Airlines operating from Concourse B include Aeromexico, American Eagle, Hainan, Mexicana, Viva, and Volaris.

The New Transit Processing Building (NEP), opened in 2022 as part of the main terminal complex, integrates cross-border processing for passengers arriving via the Cross Border Xpress (CBX) bridge. The CBX bridge lands on the building's third floor, where passengers clear Mexican immigration and customs, followed immediately by check-in and security screening before descending to the departures concourse. This facility also manages the airport's limited arriving international flights, streamlining border and airport procedures under one roof.

=== Cross Border Xpress CBX ===
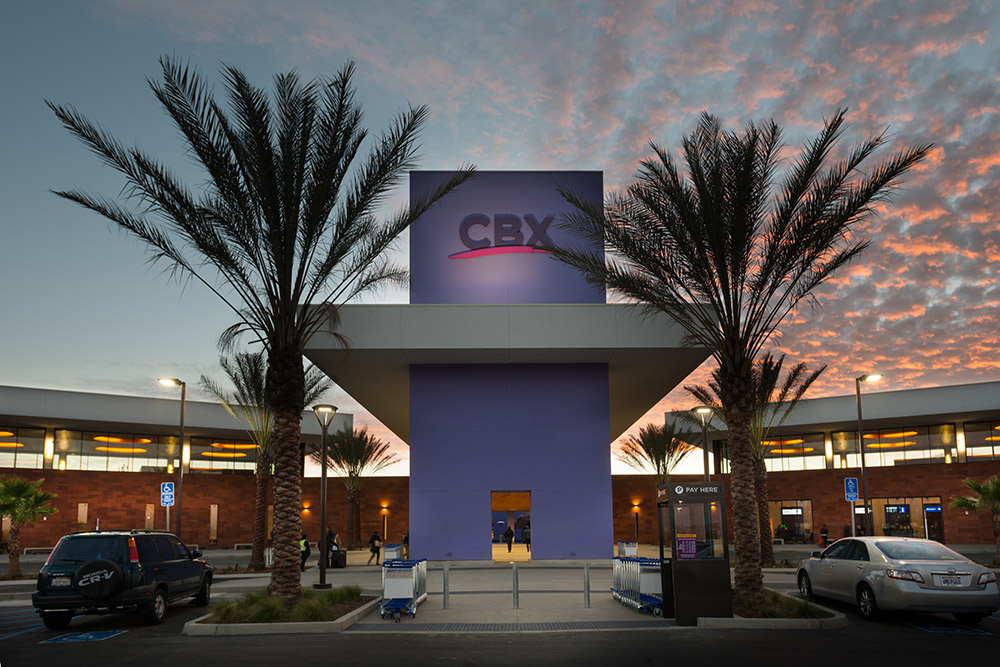
CBX entrance

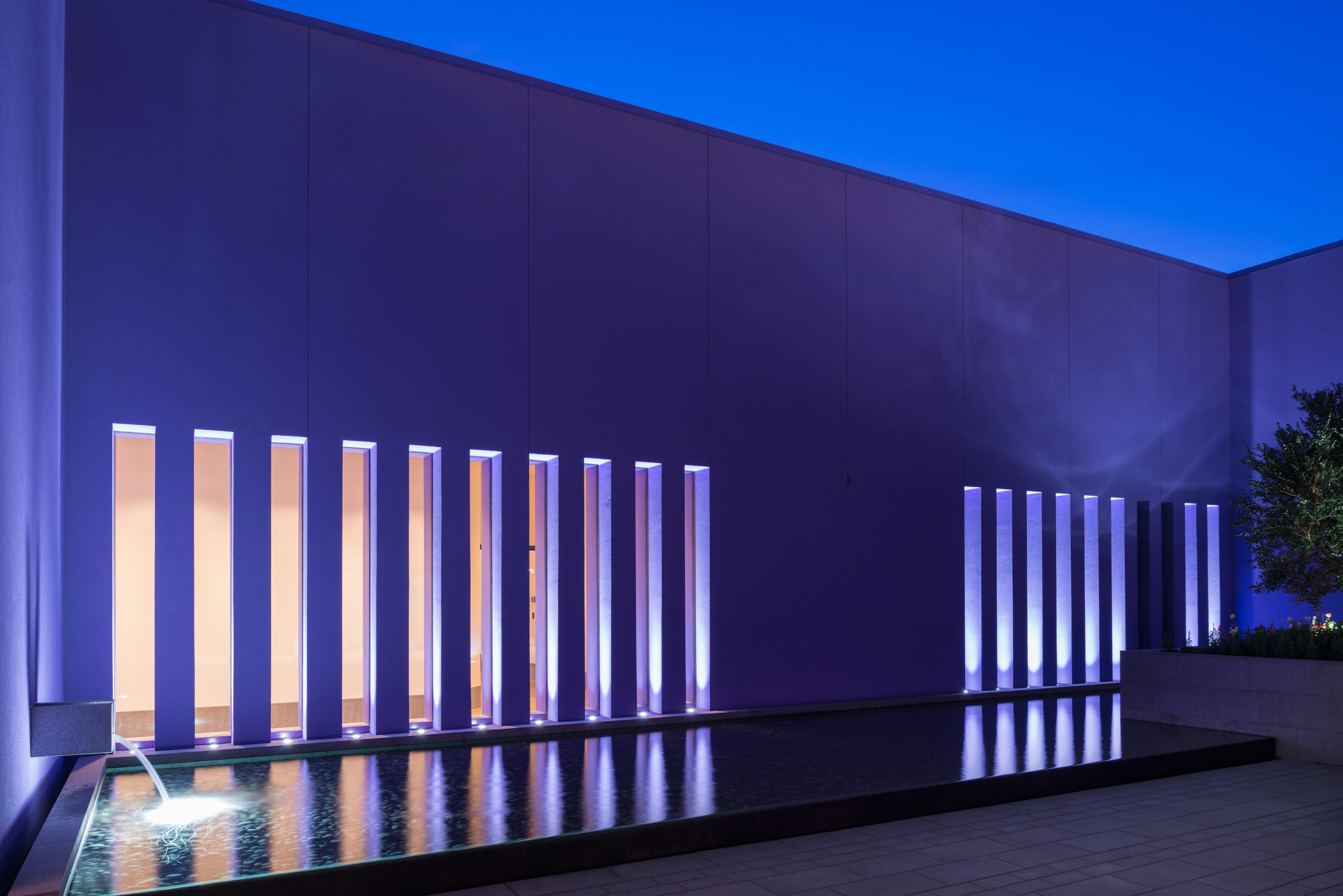
Central courtyard at the CBX

The Cross Border Xpress (CBX) is a 4,200-square-metre (45,000 sq ft) terminal located in southern San Diego, California, adjacent to the Mexican border, serving approximately one-third of Tijuana Airport's passengers. It uniquely positions Tijuana Airport as a geographically binational airport. The CBX comprises a terminal building physically located on U.S. soil, adjacent to the border, and a 120-metre (390 ft) bridge across the border connecting to the Mexican immigration and customs facilities at Tijuana Airport. It facilitates direct access for U.S. passengers to Tijuana Airport and provides Mexican and international carriers with direct entry to the U.S. market.

The building serves departure and arrival facilities. Departing passengers enter the CBX terminal on the U.S. side, cross the pedestrian bridge into Mexico, clear immigration and customs, and proceed to the departure concourses. Passengers arriving in Tijuana access the bridge from the baggage claim area and walk across into U.S. customs and immigration facilities at the CBX terminal.

The building's design is the work of the late Mexican architect Ricardo Legorreta. Its central courtyard, functioning as the primary circulation node, is a purple patio with an ash tree and a reflecting pool, referencing Mexican architecture. The arrivals hall features car rental facilities, bus agencies, and a snack bar.

The concept of a cross-border terminal was initially proposed in the 1960s as part of a broader plan to modernize Mexico's airports. Despite multiple developments and setbacks, construction commenced in 2013. With an initial estimated cost of US$78 million and a final completion cost of US$120 million, it officially opened on December 9, 2015. Building E, which houses the terminal's parking facilities, was restructured to support the bridge. The project received accolades for its design and innovation and has undergone renovations and additions, including expanded restrooms and a new duty-free zone completed in 2020.

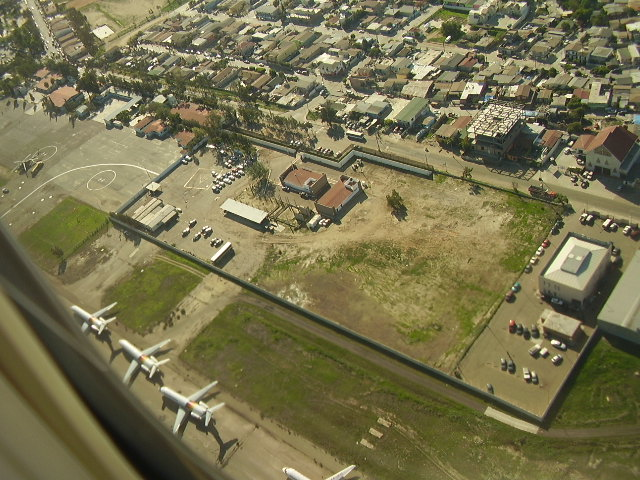
Old airport terminal seen from above

=== Other facilities ===
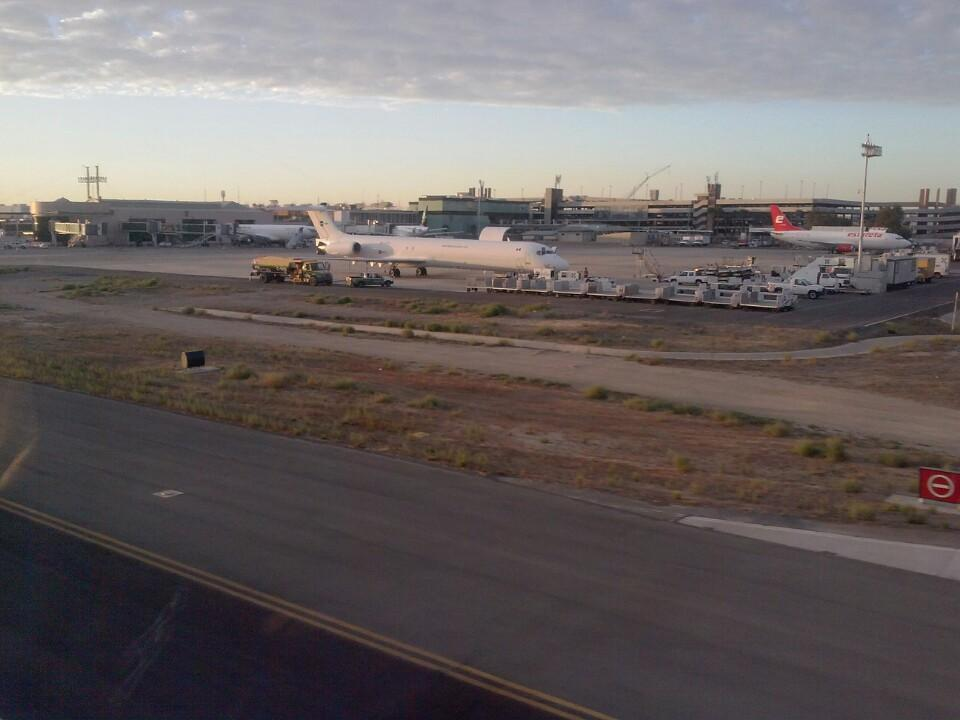
Cargo area of the airport

The General Aviation Building (GAB) is used for general or non-commercial aviation and private jets. The GAB is designed to handle up to 120 passengers per hour and has regular services for the passengers boarding private flights. It covers a surface area of 420 square metres (4,500 sq ft), housing government offices, administrative offices, a pilots’ lounge, and a passenger lounge. Two aviation schools are based at this terminal, and a cargo airline also operates from the facility.

Brown Field Municipal Airport (SDM) in San Diego, California, lies just over 1,900 metres (6,200 ft) north of the airport, with a similar runway length and orientation. SDM is a general aviation facility without scheduled commercial service.

Air Force Base Nr. 12 (Spanish: Base Aérea Militar N.º 12, Tijuana, Baja California) (B.A.M. No. 12) is a facility of the Mexican Air Force located on the airport grounds. Currently, it does not have an assigned air squadron. It has an aviation platform of 14,400 square metres (155,000 sq ft), one hangar, and other facilities for the accommodation of air force personnel. These facilities are located at the Old Airport Terminal.

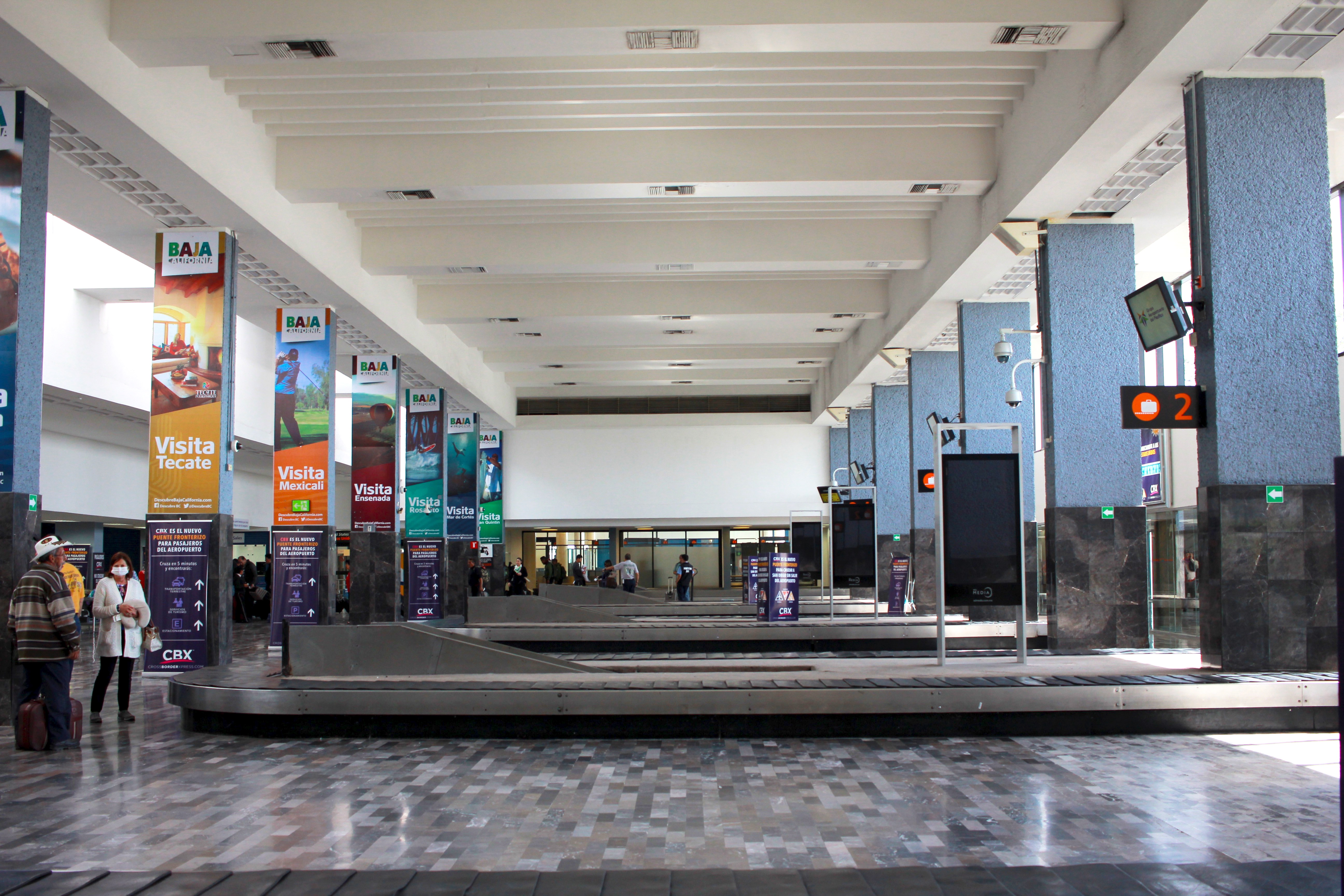
Baggage claim area

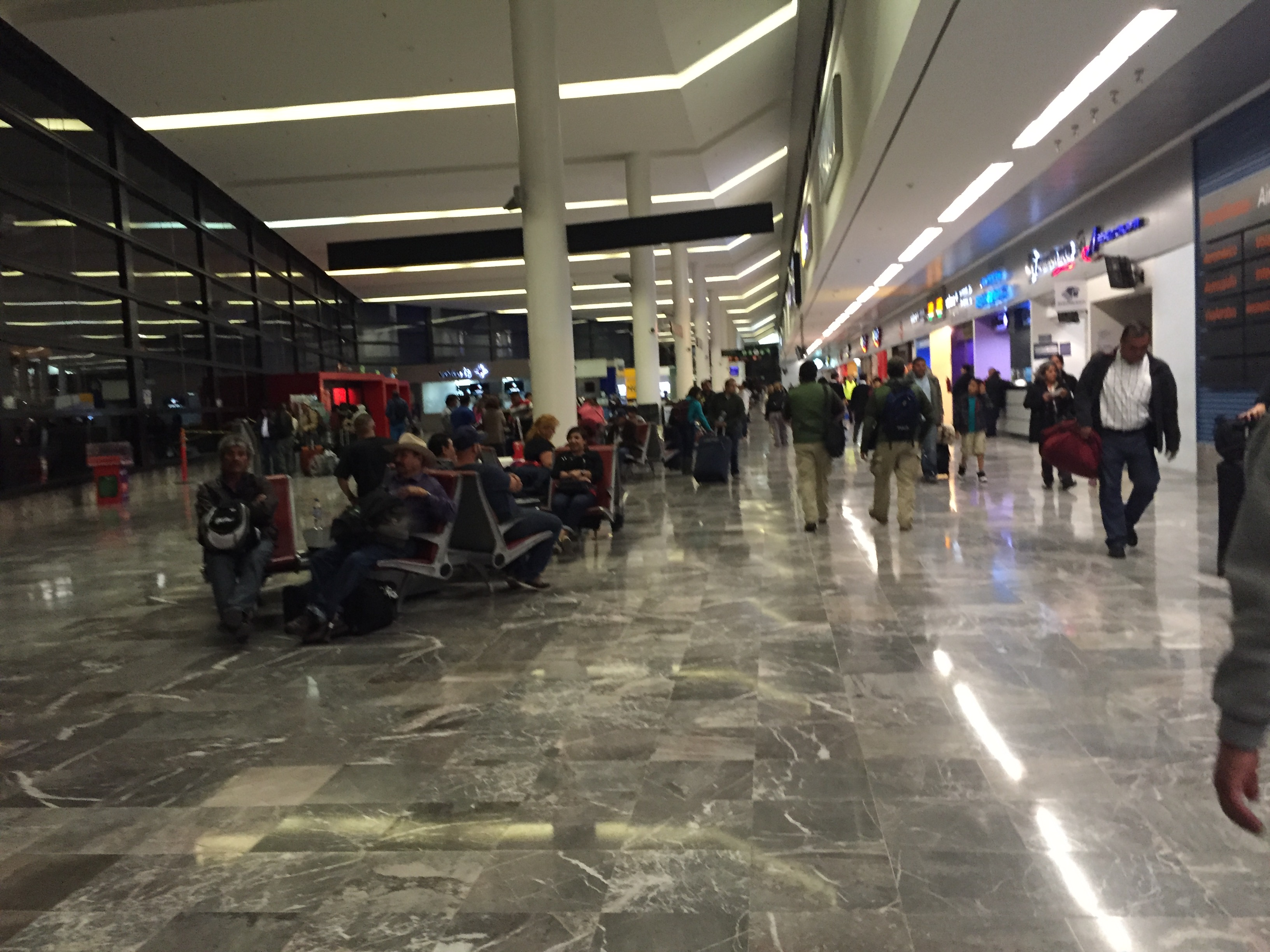
Entrance hall at the passenger terminal

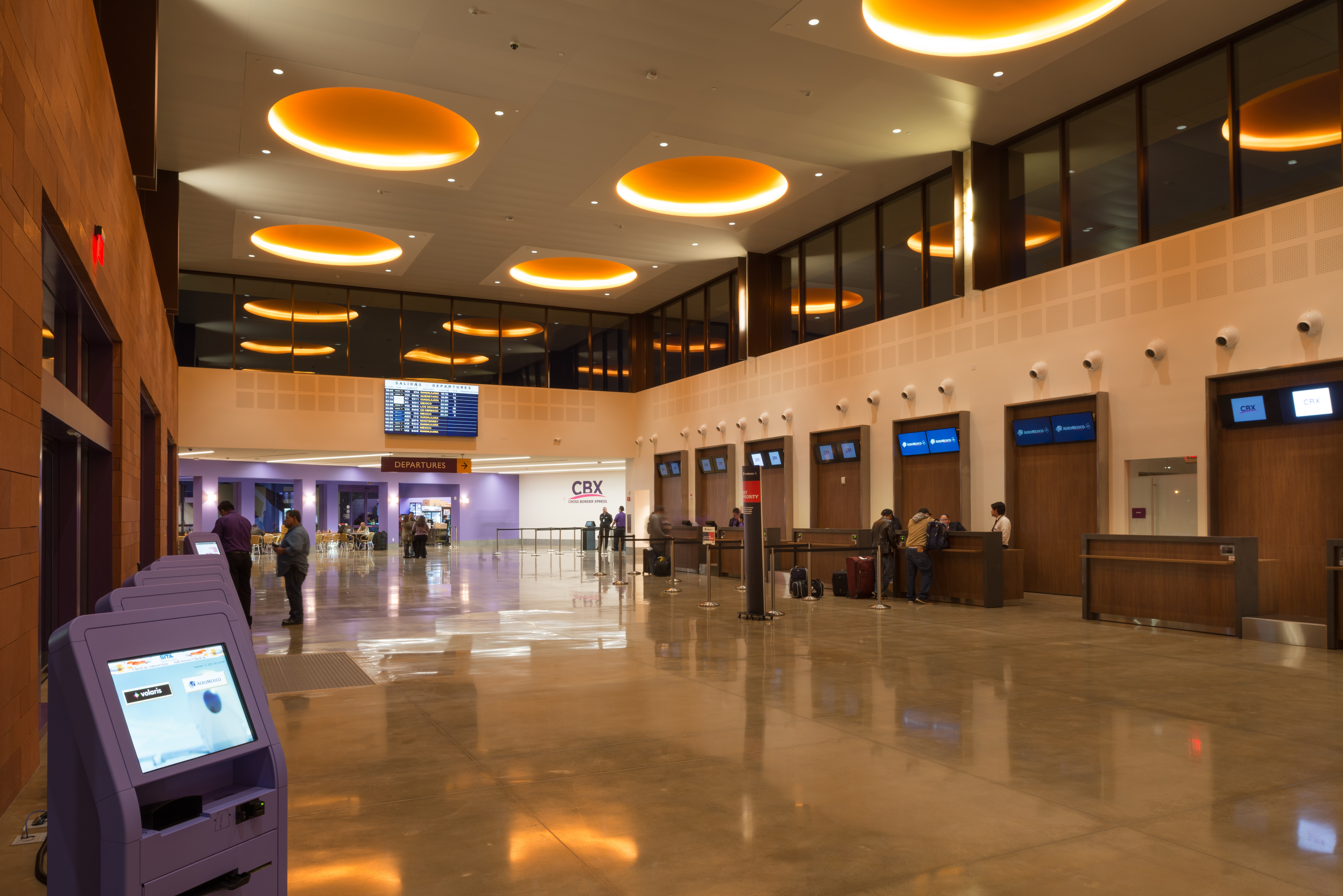
Departures hall at CBX

== Airlines and destinations ==
=== Passenger ===
Airlines	Destinations
Aeroméxico	Mexico City–Benito Juárez; Seasonal: Guadalajara
Hainan Airlines	Beijing–Capital
Mexicana de Aviación	Mexico City–Felipe Ángeles
Viva	Cancún, Culiacán, Guadalajara, La Paz, León/Del Bajío, Mazatlán, Mexico City–Benito Juárez, Mexico City–Felipe Ángeles, Monterrey, Morelia, Oaxaca, Puebla, Puerto Vallarta, Querétaro, San José del Cabo, Tuxtla Gutiérrez, Veracruz
Volaris	Acapulco, Aguascalientes, Cancún, Chihuahua, Ciudad Juárez, Ciudad Obregón, Colima, Culiacán, Durango, Guadalajara, Hermosillo, Ixtapa/Zihuatanejo, La Paz, León/Del Bajío, Loreto, Los Mochis, Mazatlán, Mérida, Mexico City–Benito Juárez, Mexico City–Felipe Ángeles, Monterrey, Morelia, Oaxaca, Puebla, Puerto Escondido, Puerto Vallarta, Querétaro, San José del Cabo, San Luis Potosí, Tapachula, Tepic, Toluca/Mexico City, Torreón/Gómez Palacio, Tuxtla Gutiérrez, Uruapan, Veracruz, Zacatecas

=== Cargo ===
Airlines	Destinations
Aeronaves TSM	Hermosillo, Querétaro
Avianca Cargo México	Mexico City–AIFA
China Southern Cargo	Mexico City–AIFA, Shanghai–Pudong
Estafeta	Culiacán, Hermosillo
FedEx Feeder operated by Empire Airlines	San Diego

=== Destinations map ===
Domestic destinations from Tijuana International Airport
Red = Year-round destination
Blue = Future destination
Green = Seasonal destination

International destinations from Tijuana International Airport
Red = Year-round destination
Blue = Future destination
Green = Seasonal destination

== Statistics ==
=== Annual Traffic ===
Tijuana International Airport Passenger Statistics
Year	Total passengers	change %
2006	3,744,504	Steady
2007	4,726,514	▲26.22%
2008	3,956,013	▼16.30%
2009	3,394,585	▼14.19%
2010	3,636,771	▲7.13%
2011	3,488,338	▼4.08%
2012	3,750,928	▲7.52%
2013	4,255,235	▲13.44%
2014	4,372,865	▲2.76%
2015	4,853,797	▲10.99%
2016	6,318,826	▲30.18%
2017	7,089,219	▲12.19%
2018	7,823,744	▲10.36%
2019	8,917,160	▲13.98%
2020	6,316,600	▼29.2%
2021	9,677,900	▲53.2%
2022	12,308,370	▲27.34%
2023	13,180,604	▲7.08%
2024	12,545,800	▼4.81%
2025	12,650,000	▲0.8%

=== Busiest routes ===
Busiest routes from TIJ (Jan–Dec 2025)
Rank	City	Passengers
1	Mexico City, Mexico City	982,170
2,	Guadalajara, Jalisco	909,402
3	Culiacán, Sinaloa	363,302
4	León/El Bajío, Guanajuato	297,989
5	Monterrey, Nuevo León	243,997
6	Puerto Vallarta, Jalisco	231,799
7	Morelia, Michoacán	228,627
8	Mexico City-AIFA, State of Mexico	226,457
9	San José del Cabo, Baja California Sur	221,094
10	Mazatlán, Sinaloa	219,108

== Ground transportation ==
=== Local bus ===
The airport is served by several city bus routes connecting it to Downtown Tijuana, Zona Río, and Otay. As of 2025, fares range between MX$14.00 and MX$16.00 (approximately US$0.75), depending on the route. Notable services include the Mirador–Miramar–Soler–Centro–Plaza Río–Otay–Aeropuerto and Delicias–Blvd. 2000–Otay–Centro lines.

=== Intercity and cross-border coaches ===
Several private bus lines offer long-distance service from both Tijuana International Airport and the Cross Border Xpress (CBX) terminal.

From the CBX terminal (San Diego)

Mexicoach provides routes to El Monte, San Ysidro, San Diego, Oxnard, and San Jose, while other carriers run services to Las Vegas, El Paso, Phoenix, Los Angeles, and Sacramento.

From the Tijuana terminal (Mexico side):

Autobuses ABC connects passengers to Ensenada, Mexicali, Rosarito, and other regional destinations. Transportes Intercalifornias offers first-class service to California cities such as Los Angeles, Ontario, and Bakersfield. Greyhound and other operators also maintain limited cross-border routes, which vary seasonally.

=== Taxi ===
Due to regulatory restrictions, public taxis may drop off passengers at the terminal but are not permitted to pick up passengers there. Authorized providers, including Servicio Aeroportuario de Autotransporte Terrestre (SAAT), offer licensed taxi service from the arrivals hall to destinations across Tijuana and the surrounding region. These services generally charge higher fares than standard city taxis.

=== Car rental ===
Several international and local car rental companies operate at the airport, including Alamo, Avis, Hertz, Mex Rent a Car, and Veico Car Rental.

=== Parking ===
Tijuana International Airport provides several parking options for passengers, including short-term and long-term parking lots adjacent to the main terminal. The facilities accommodate private vehicles and rental cars, with designated areas for disabled parking. Parking rates are regulated by airport authorities and typically include hourly and daily fees. Additional parking is available at the Cross Border Xpress terminal in San Diego, offering secure lots for travelers using the binational bridge.

== Gallery ==
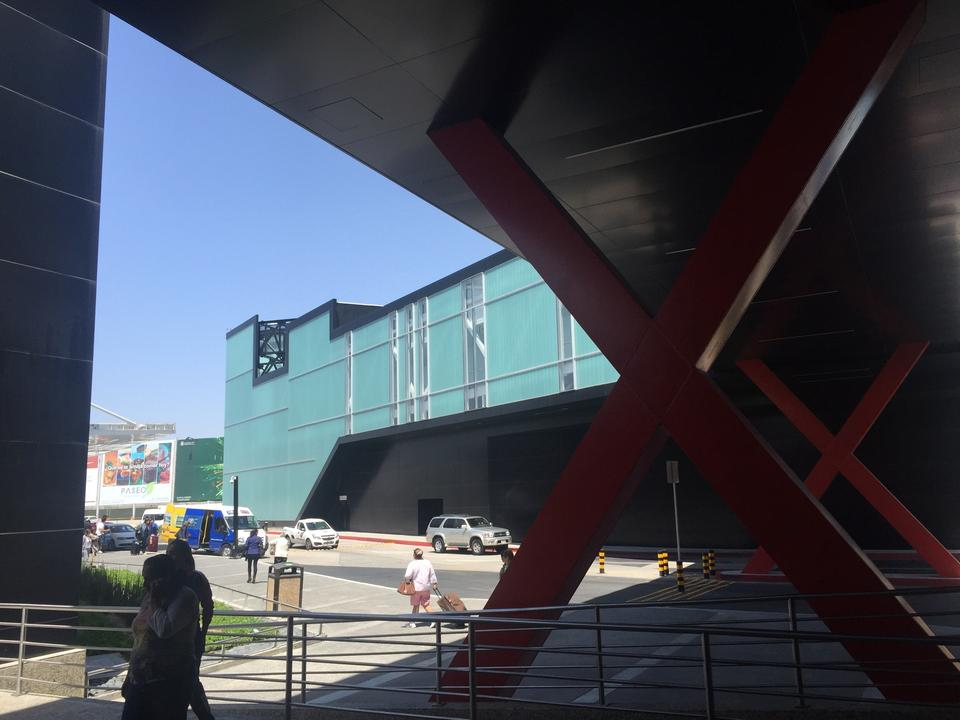
CBX from Mexican side

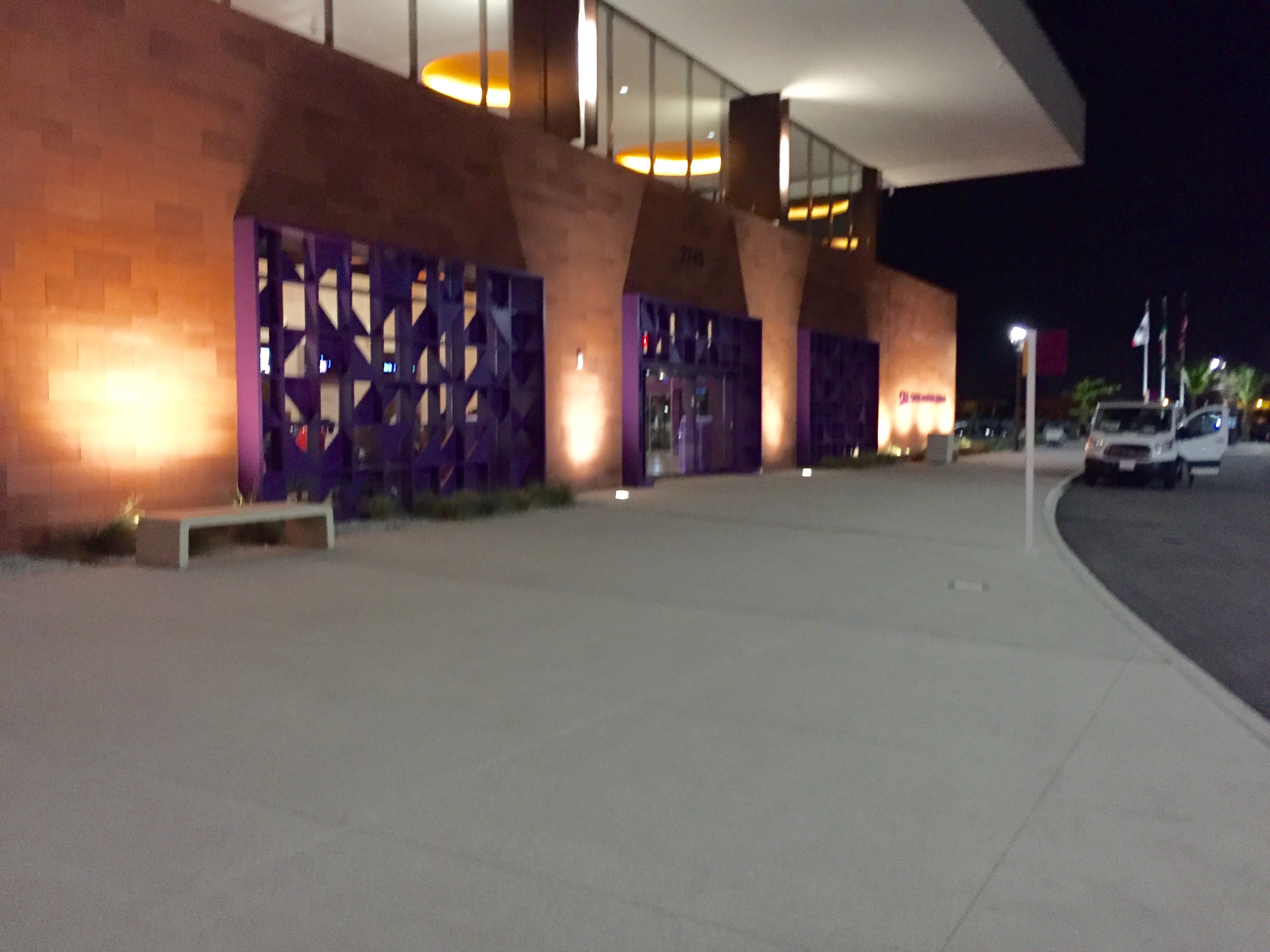
CBX from the U.S. side

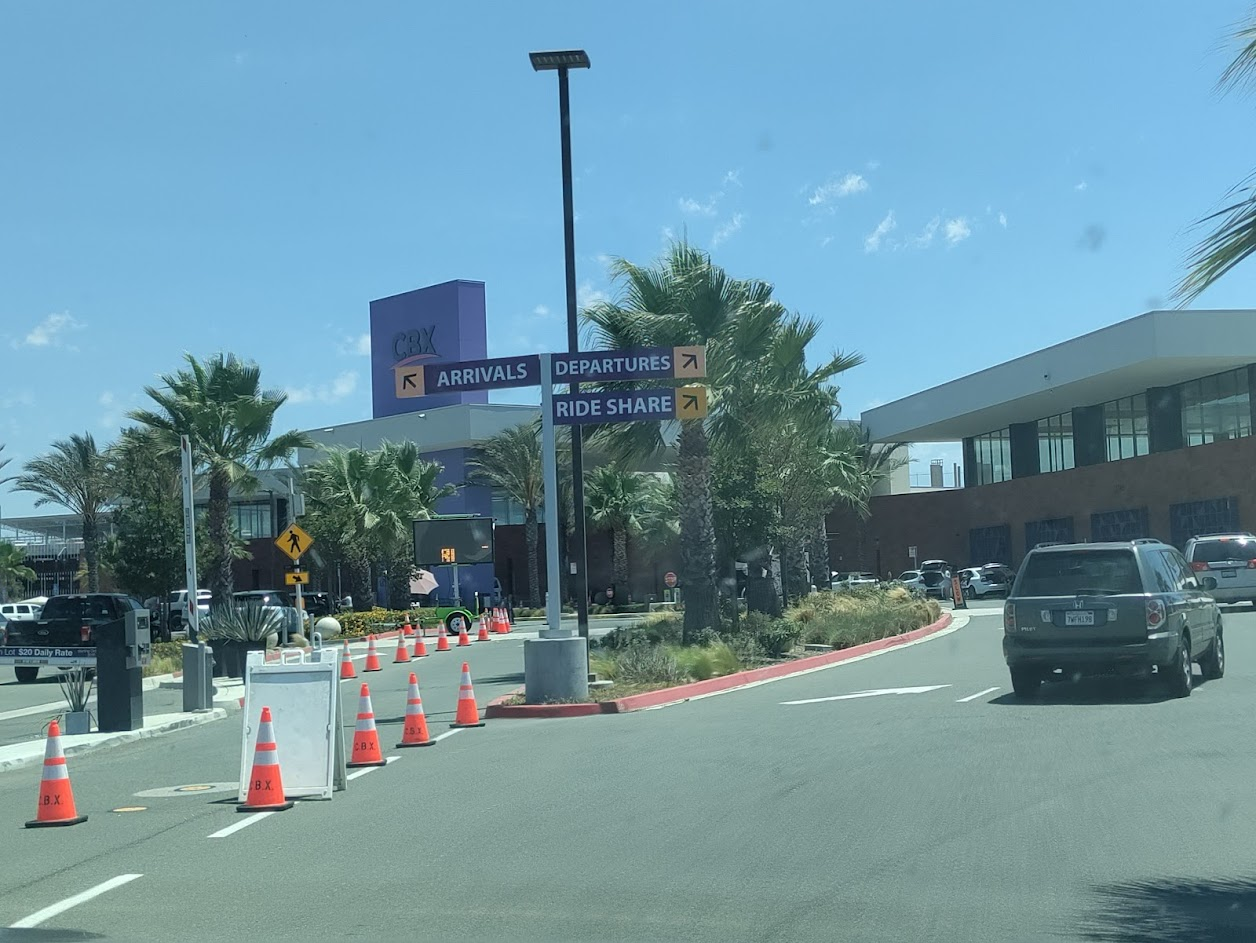
CBX from U.S. side during daytime

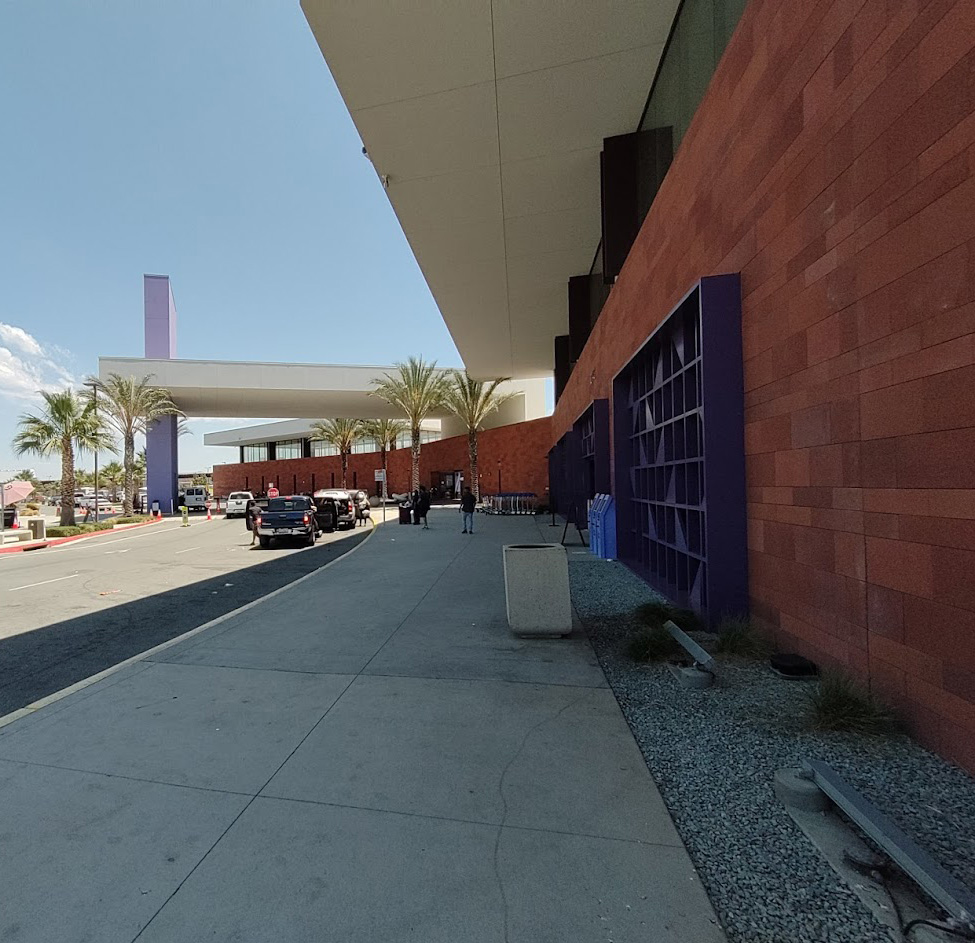
CBX terminal entrance

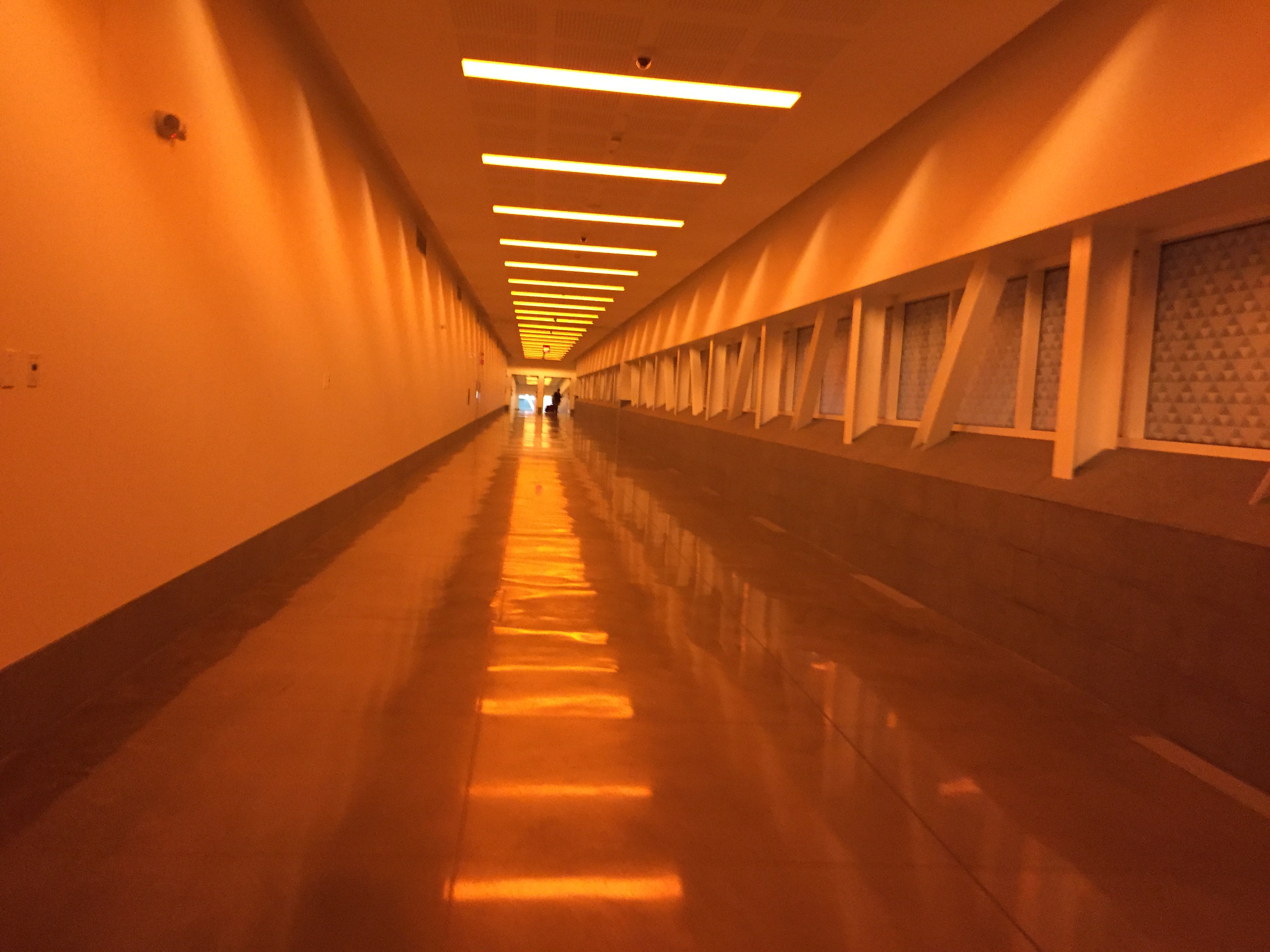
CBX pedestrian bridge

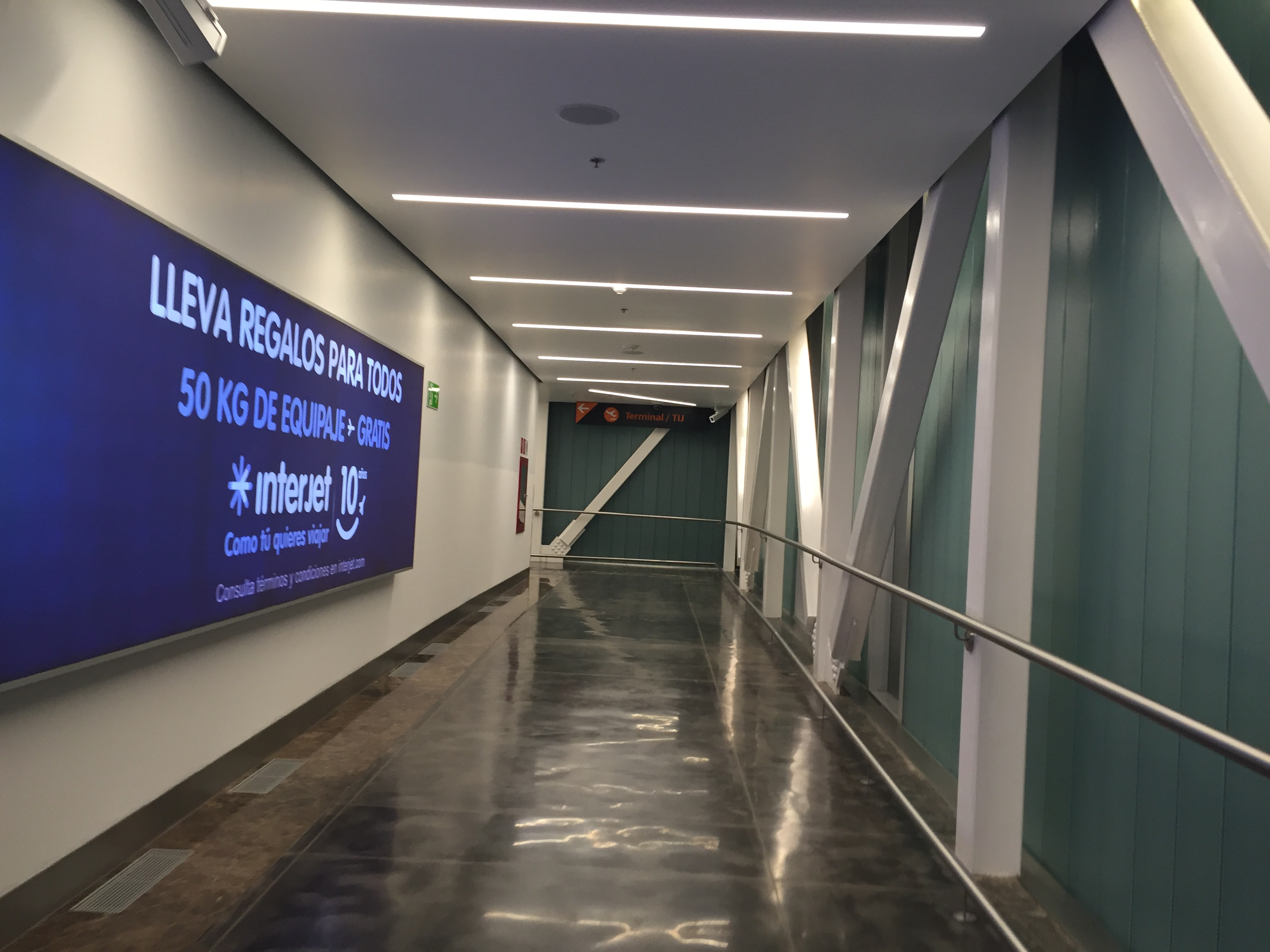
CBX pedestrian bridge

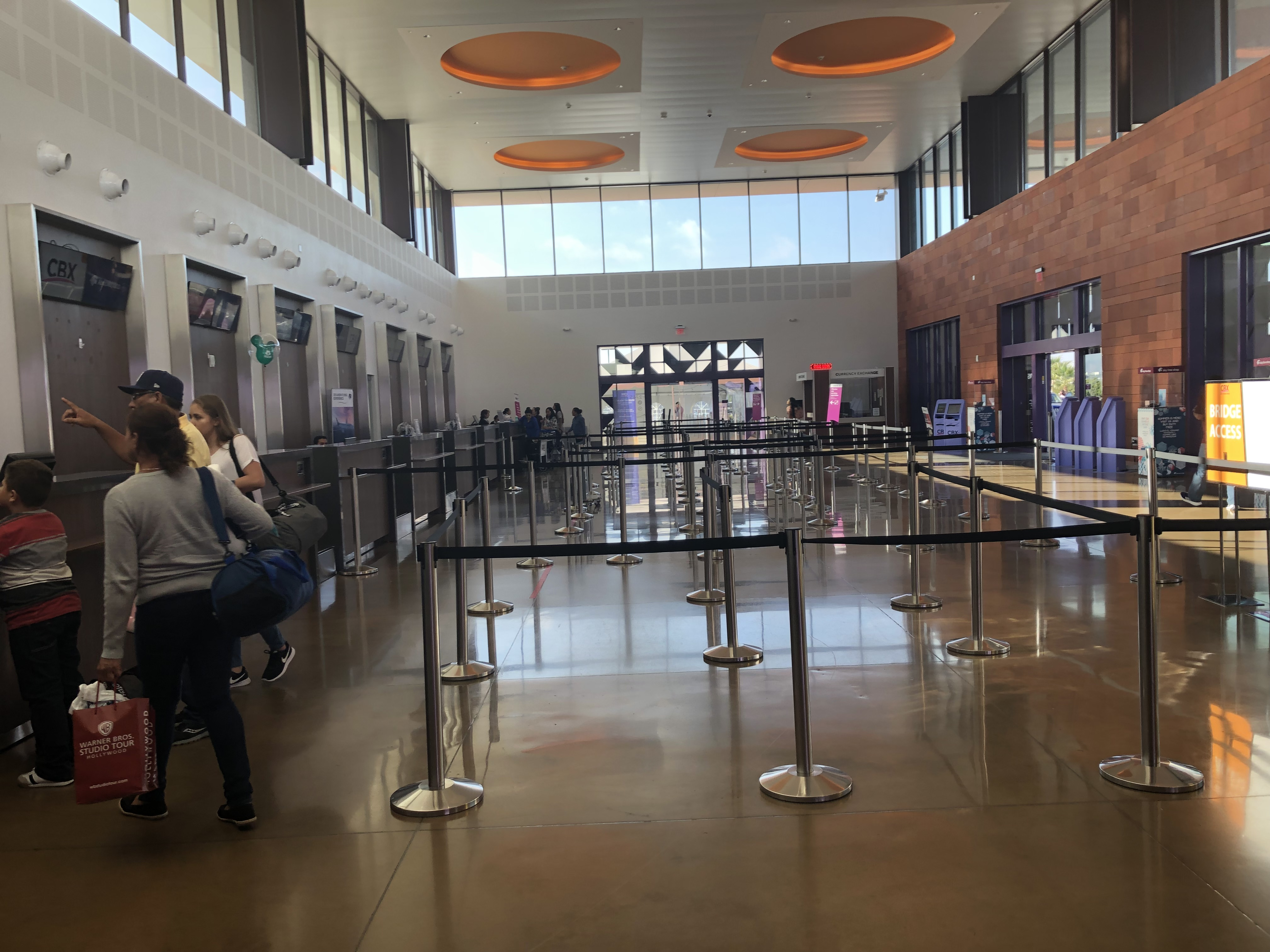
CBX Departures hall

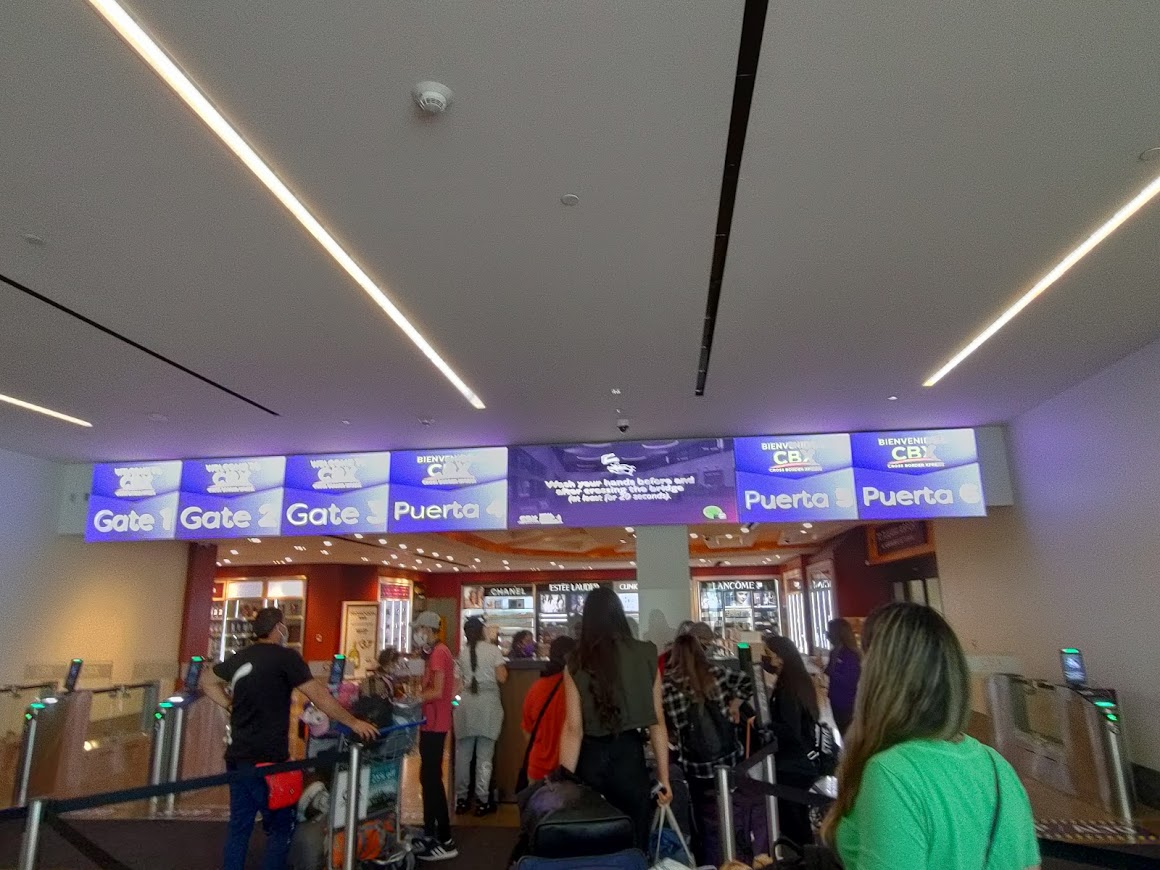
CBX check-in entrance

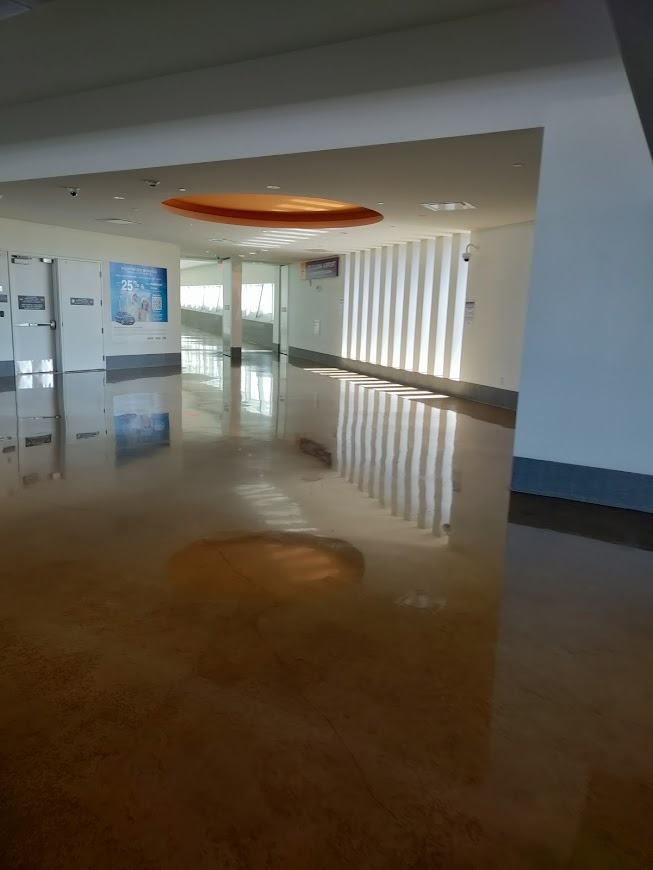
CBX entrance to the pedestrian bridge

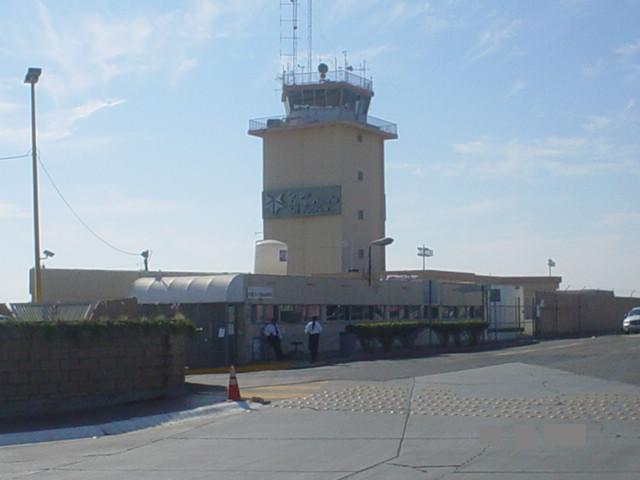
Control tower

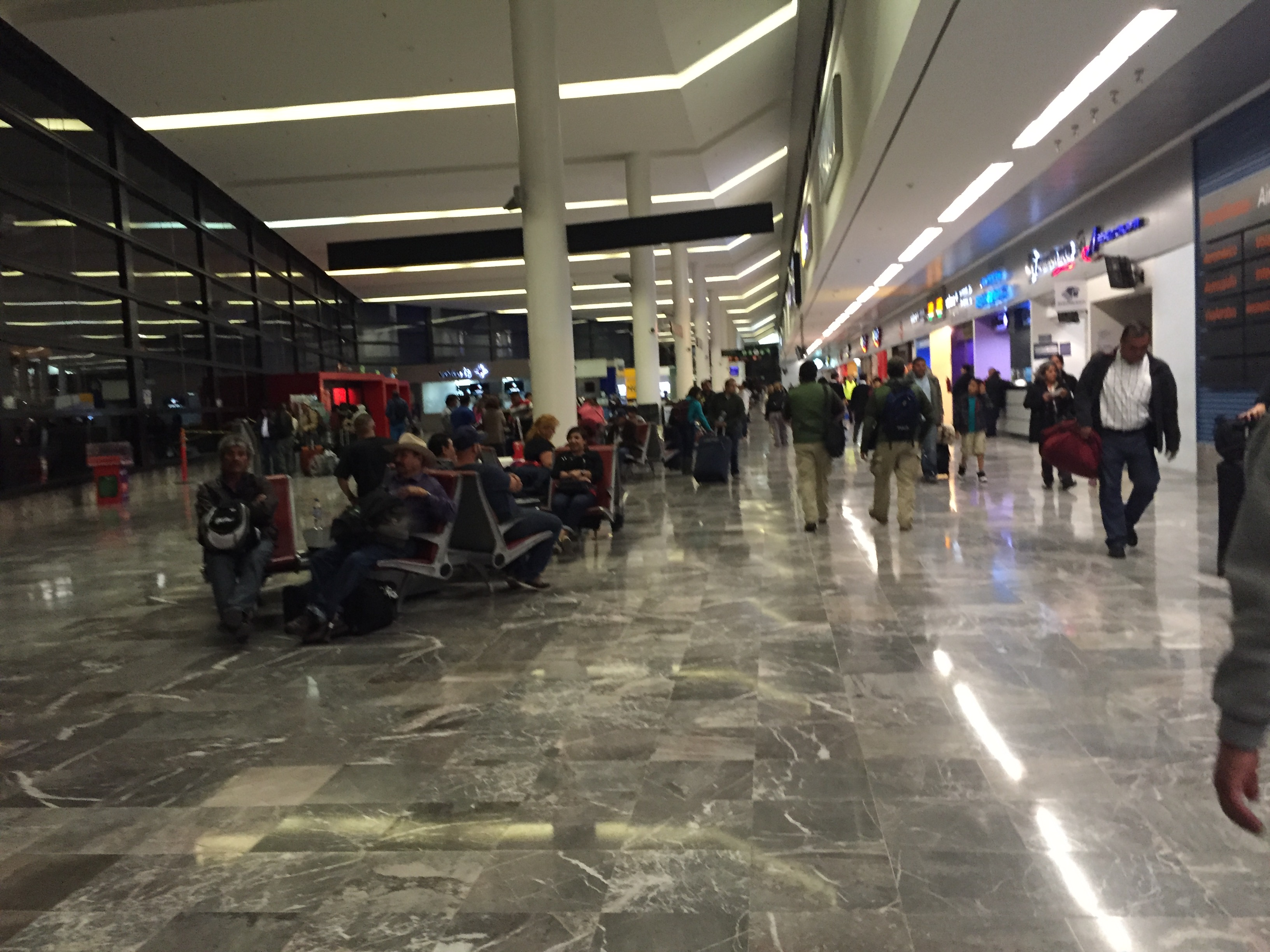
Main hall at the passenger terminal

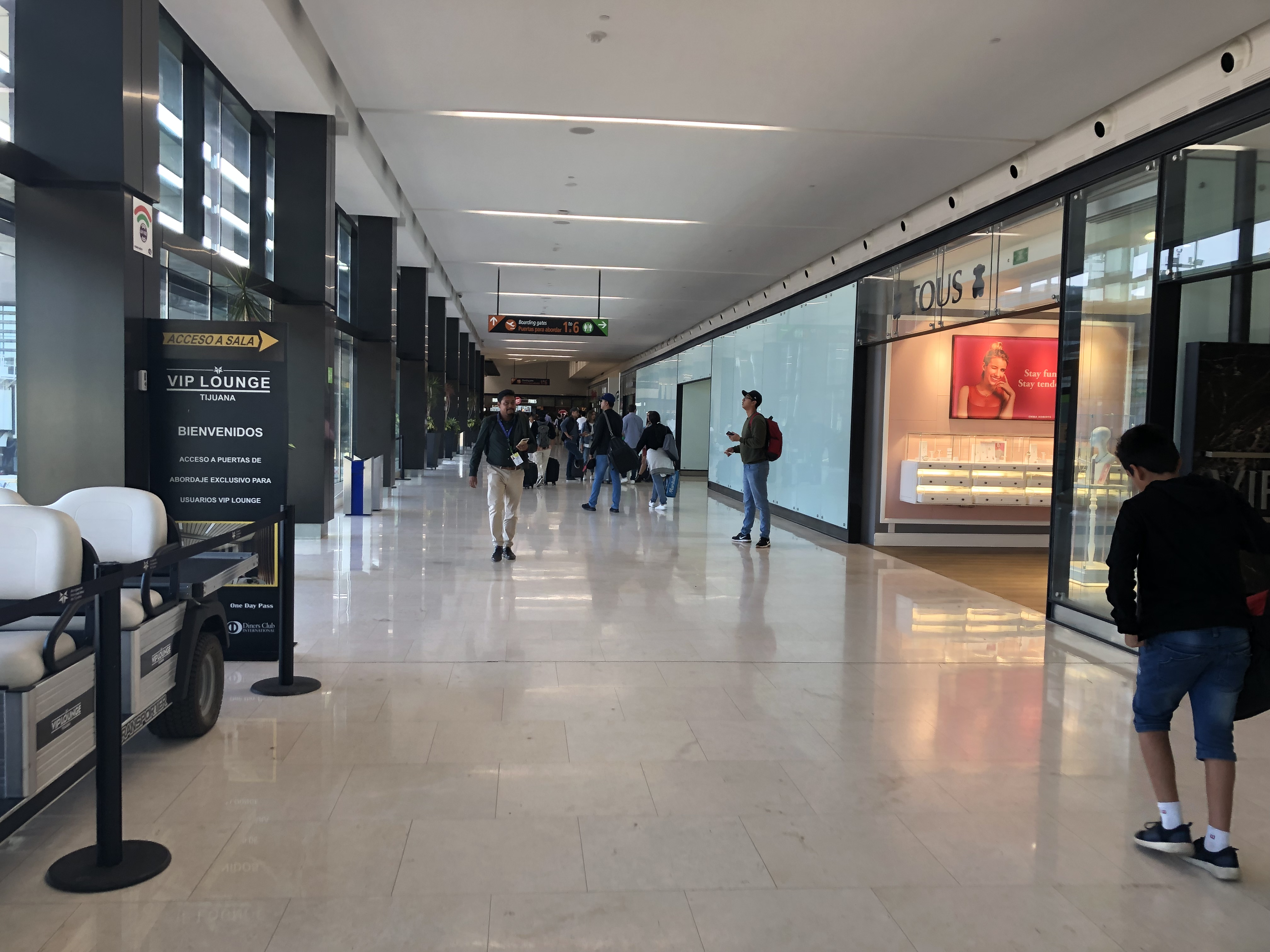
Departures hall

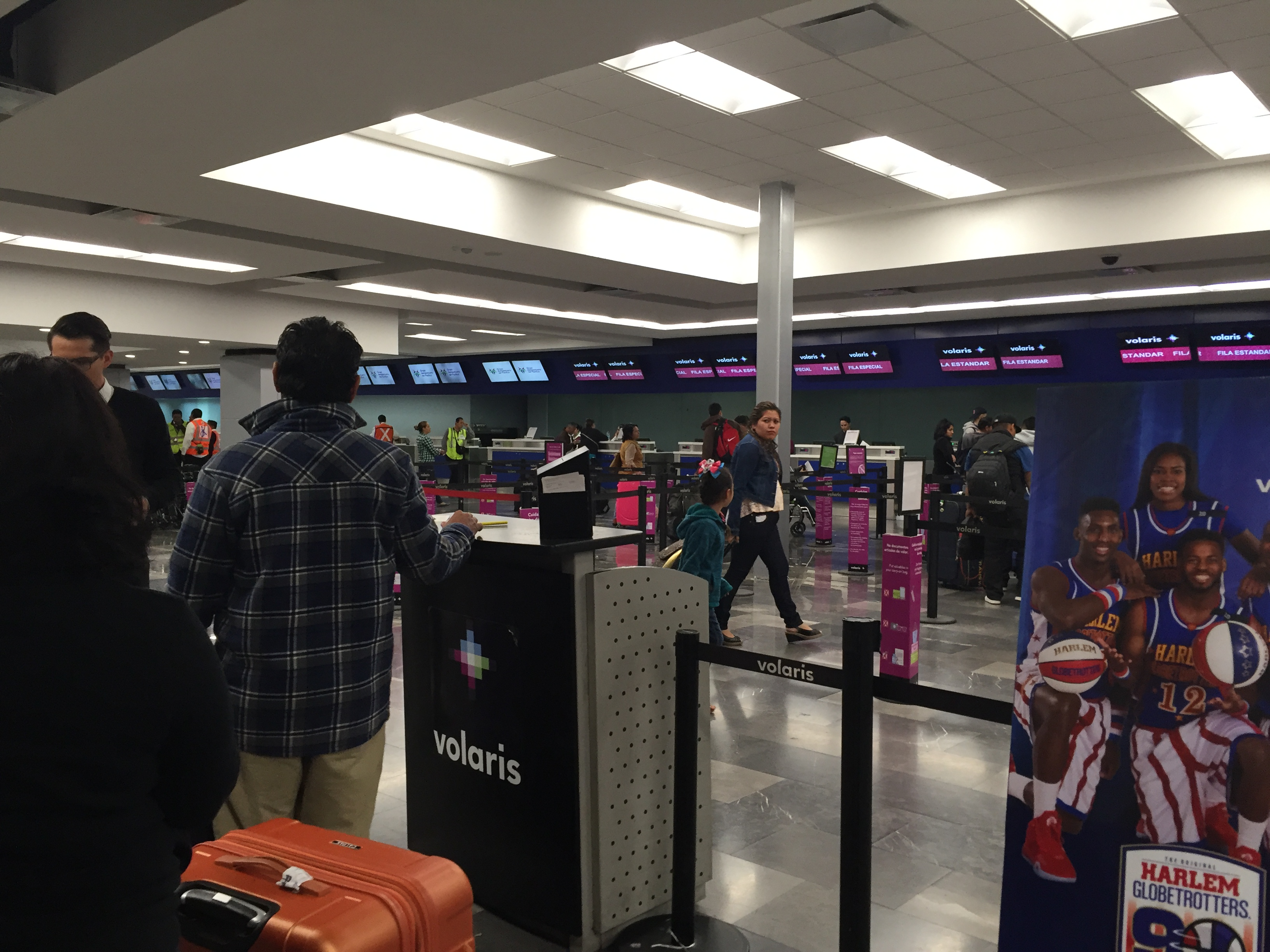
Check-in counters

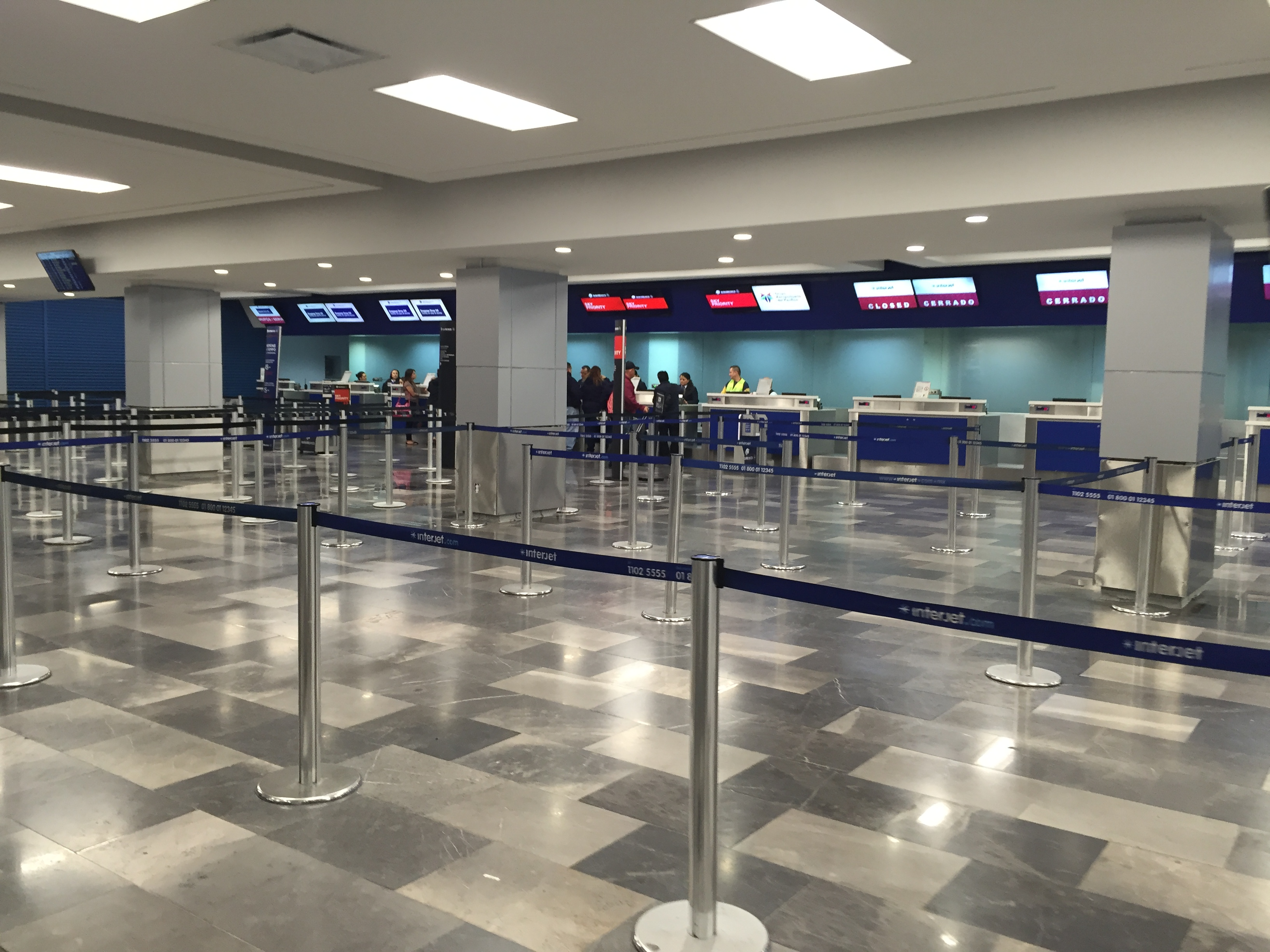
Check-in counters

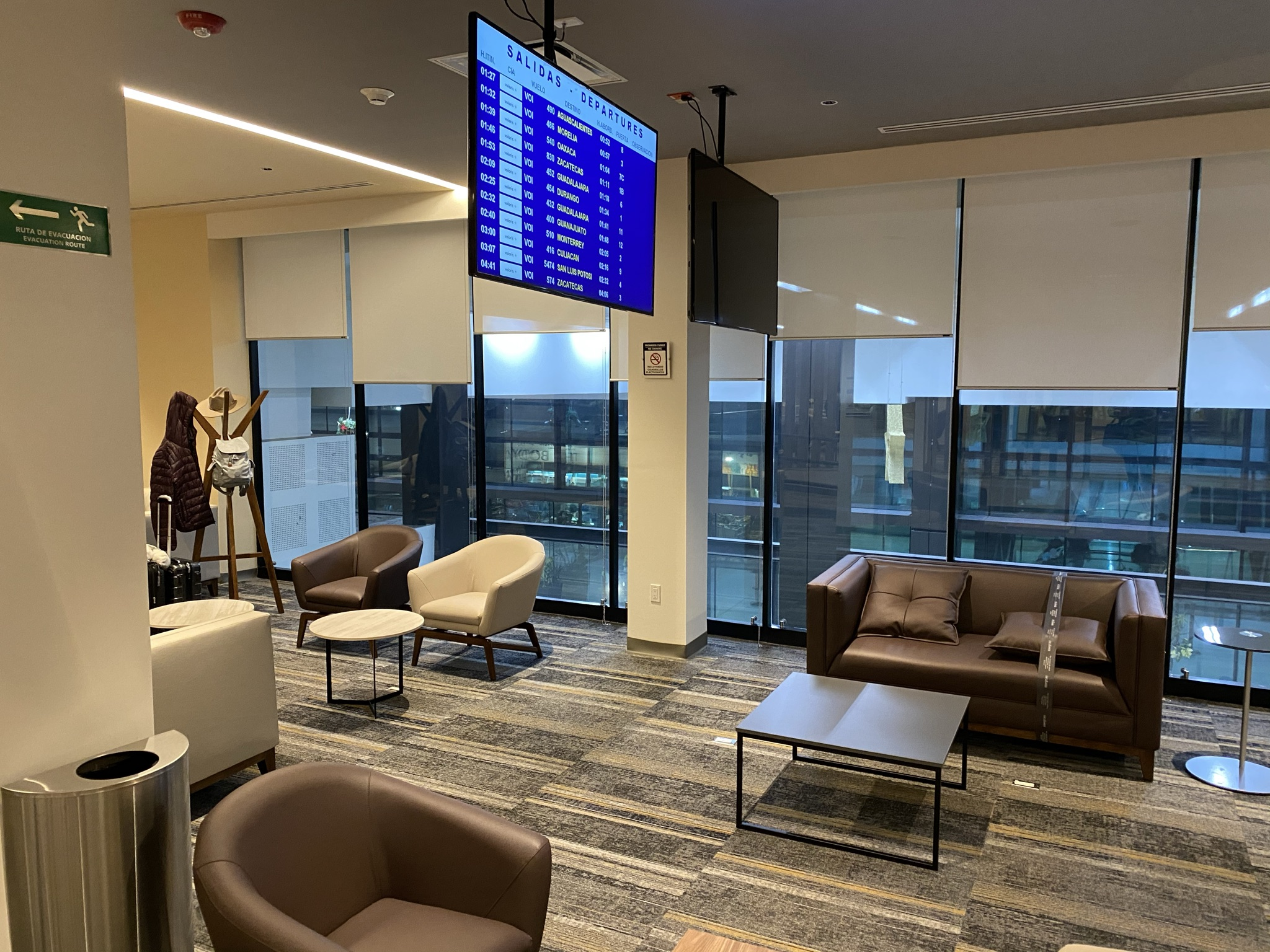
VIP Lounge

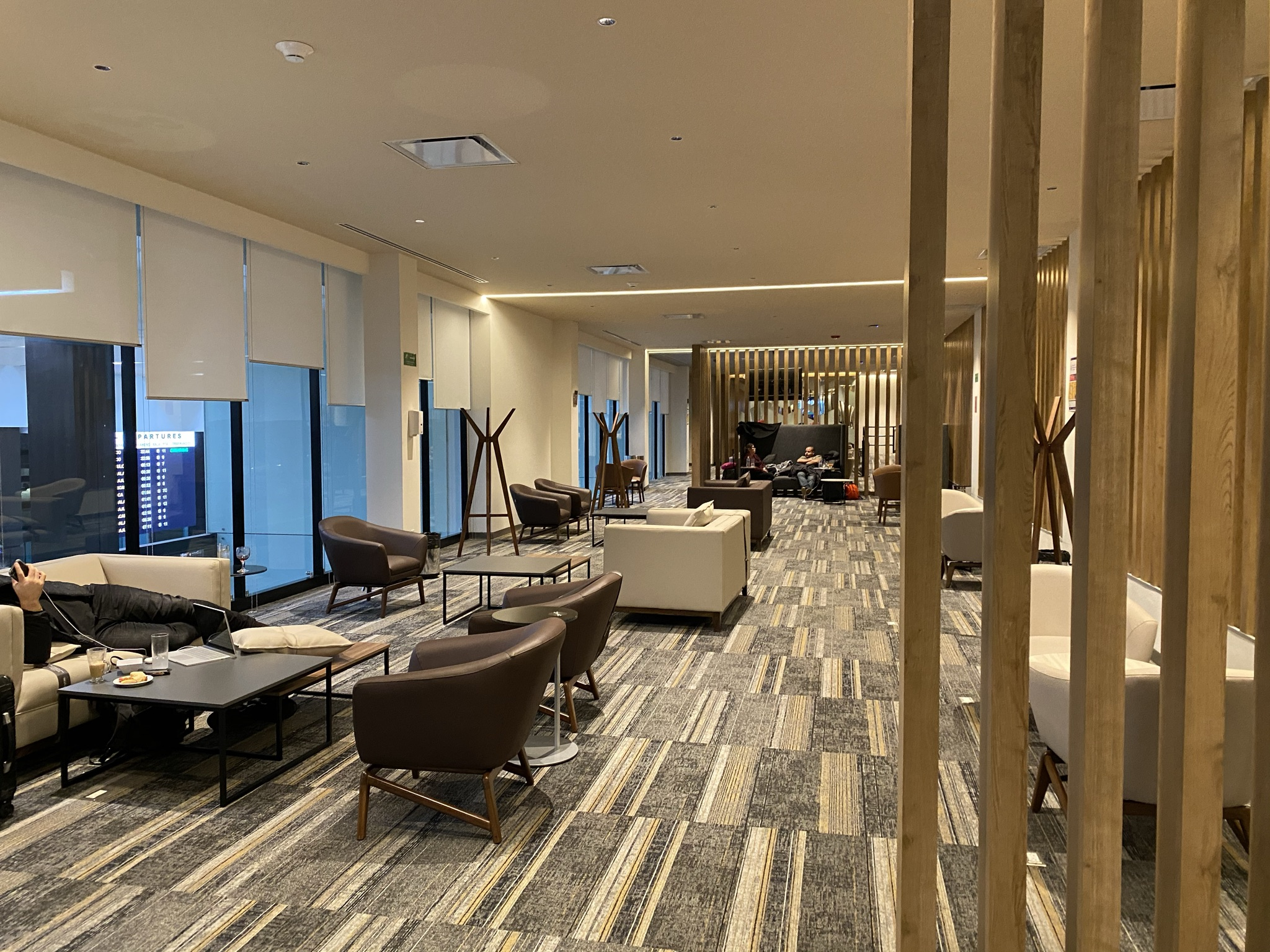
VIP Lounge

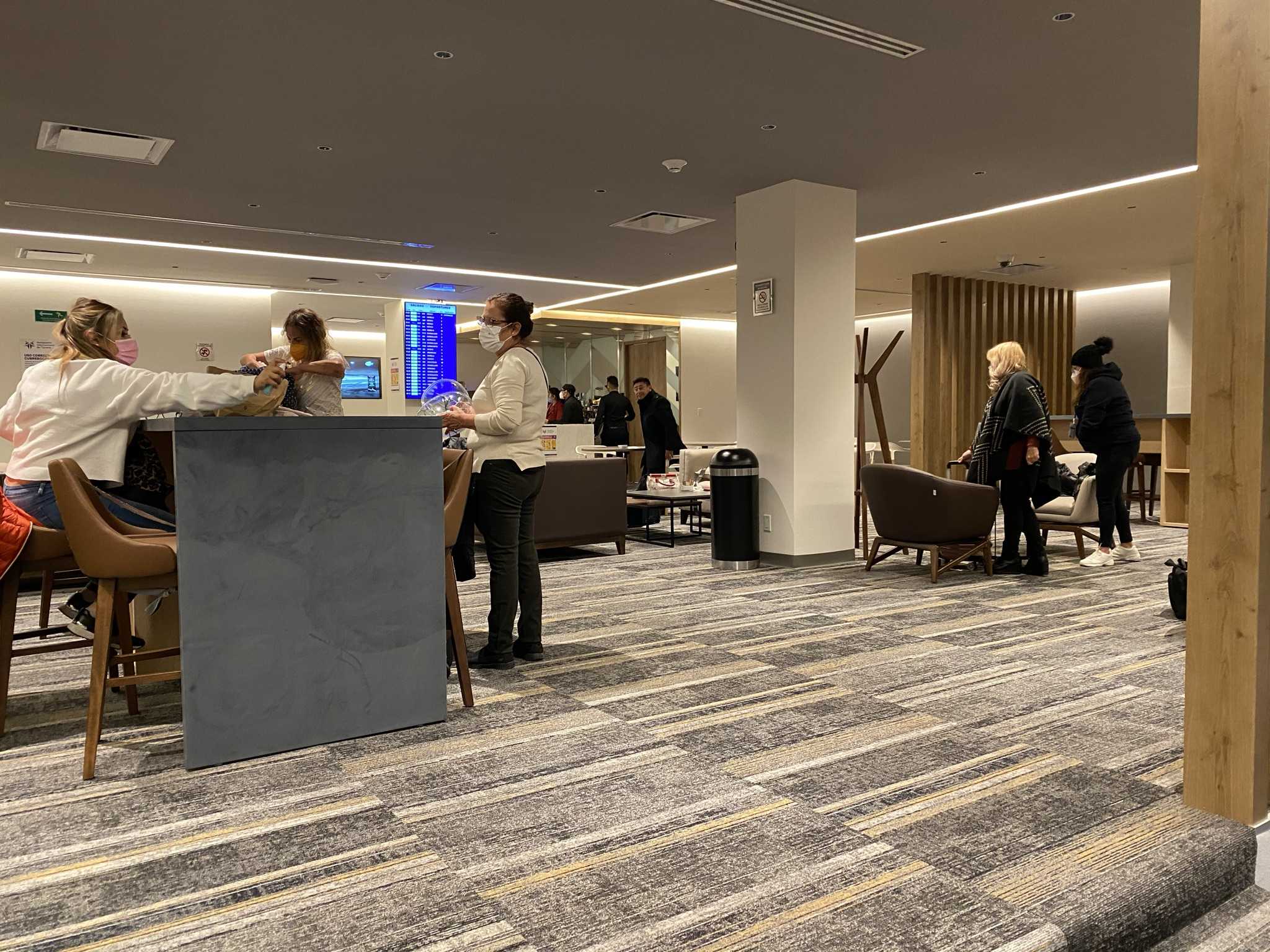
VIP Lounge

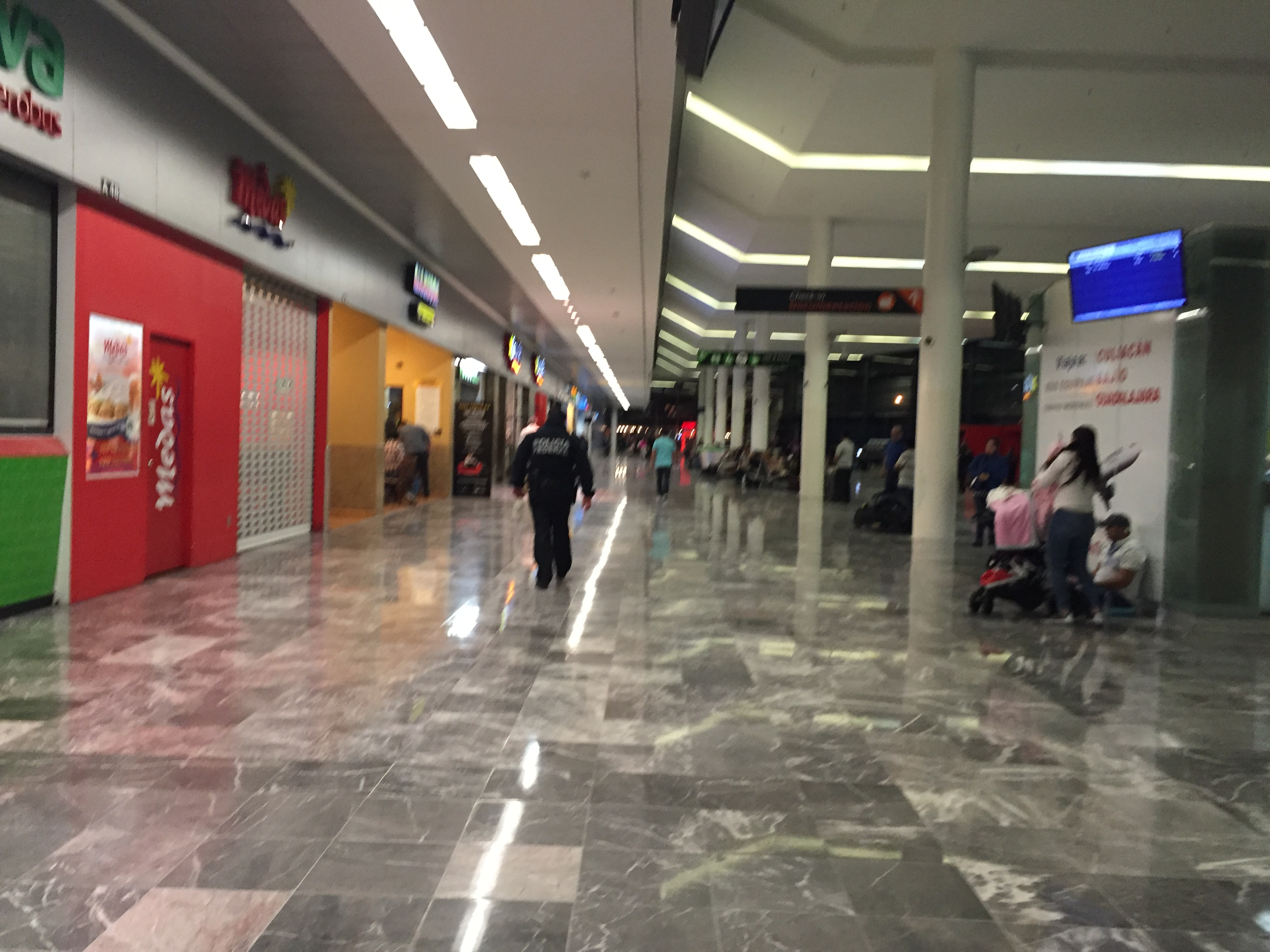
Main corridor

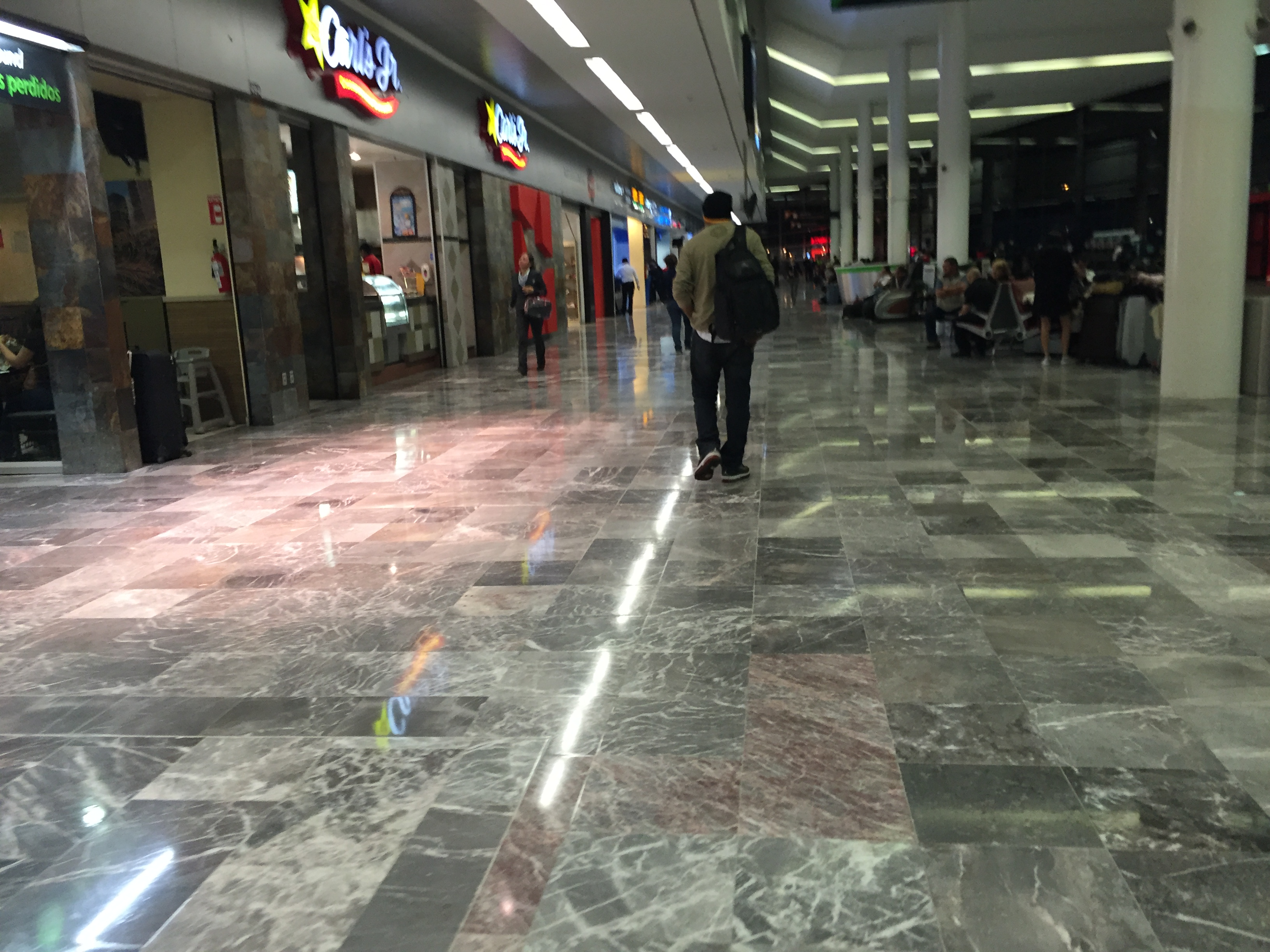
Main corridor

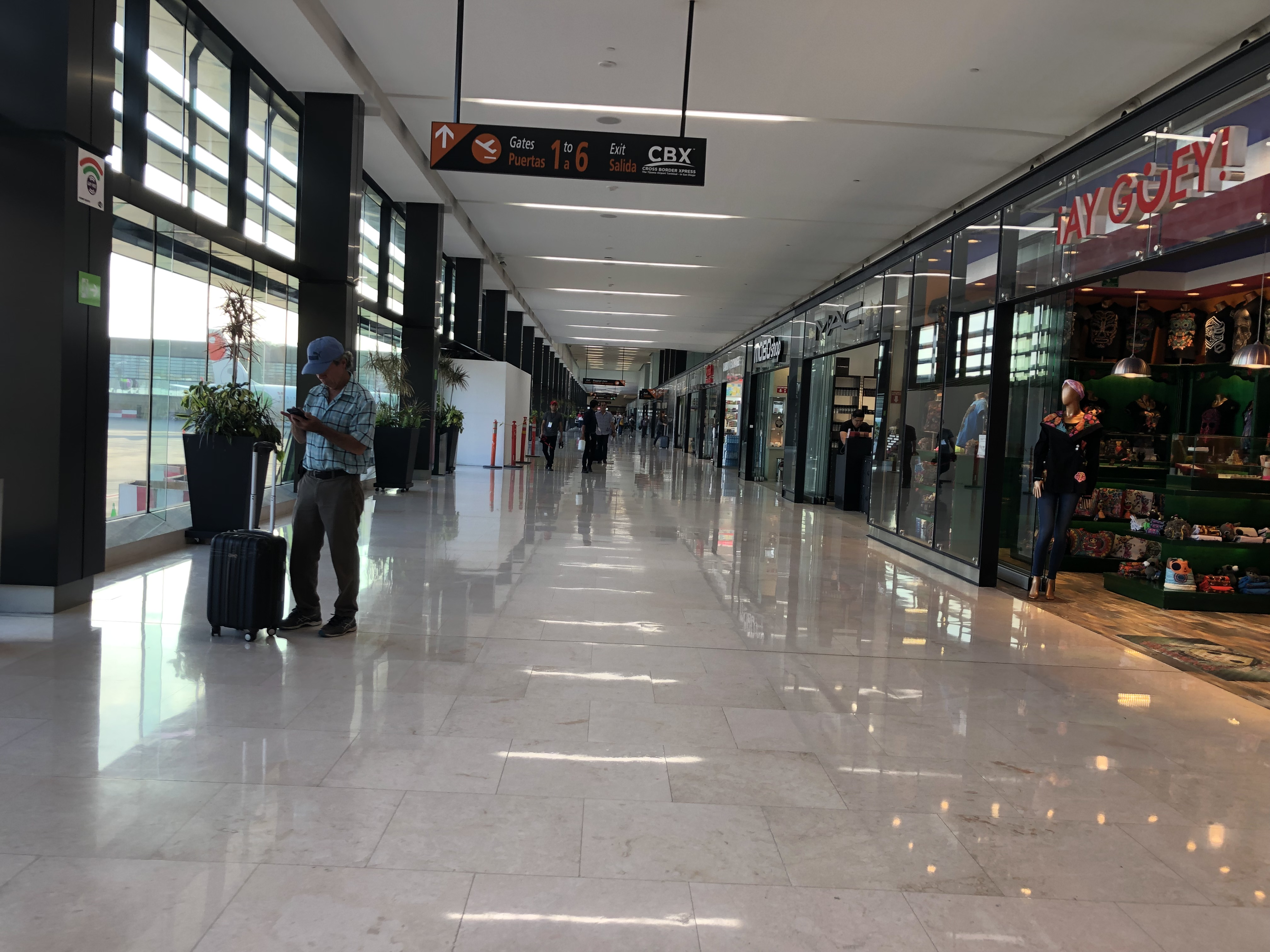
Departures hall

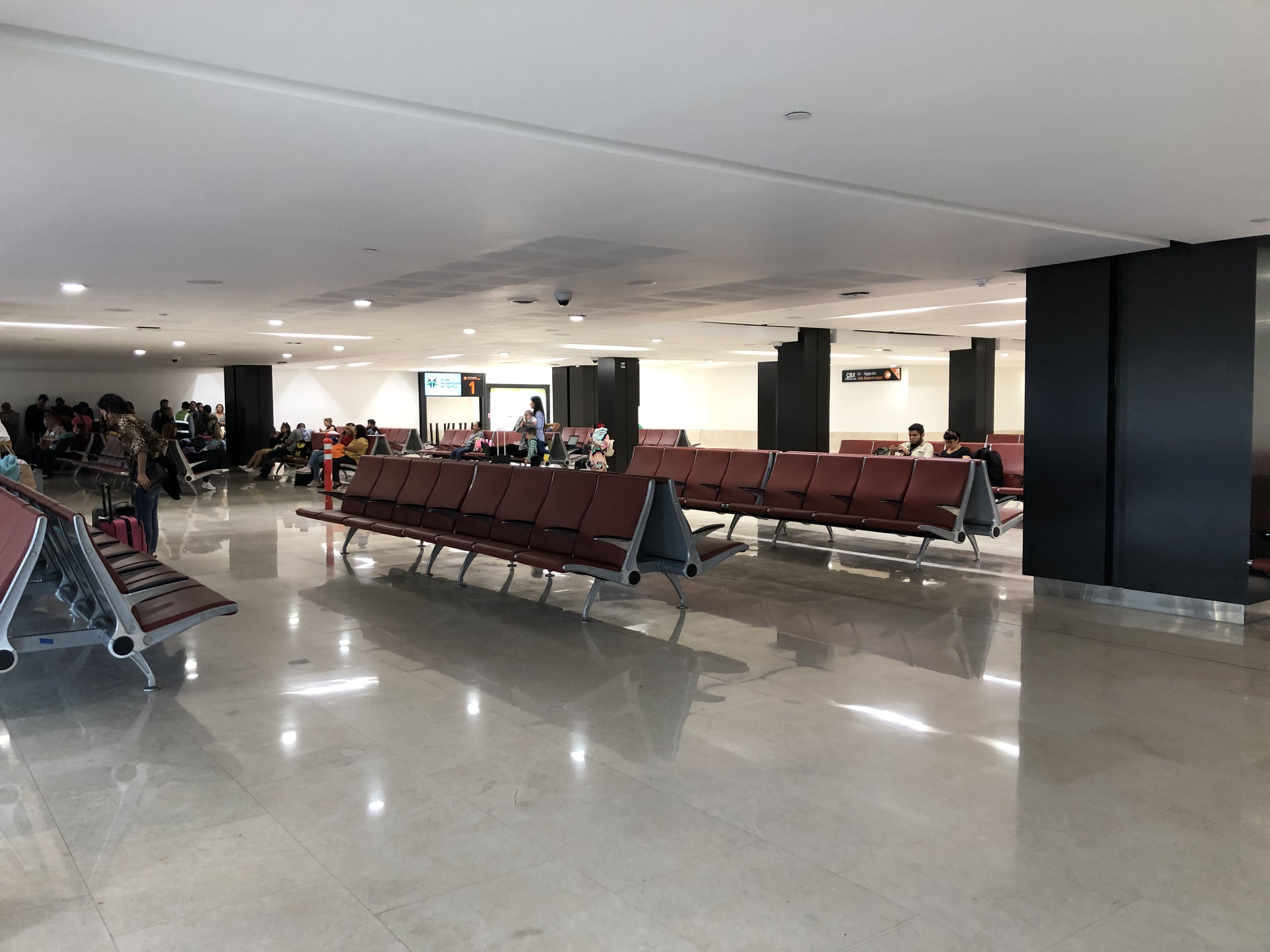
Gates 1A-1C

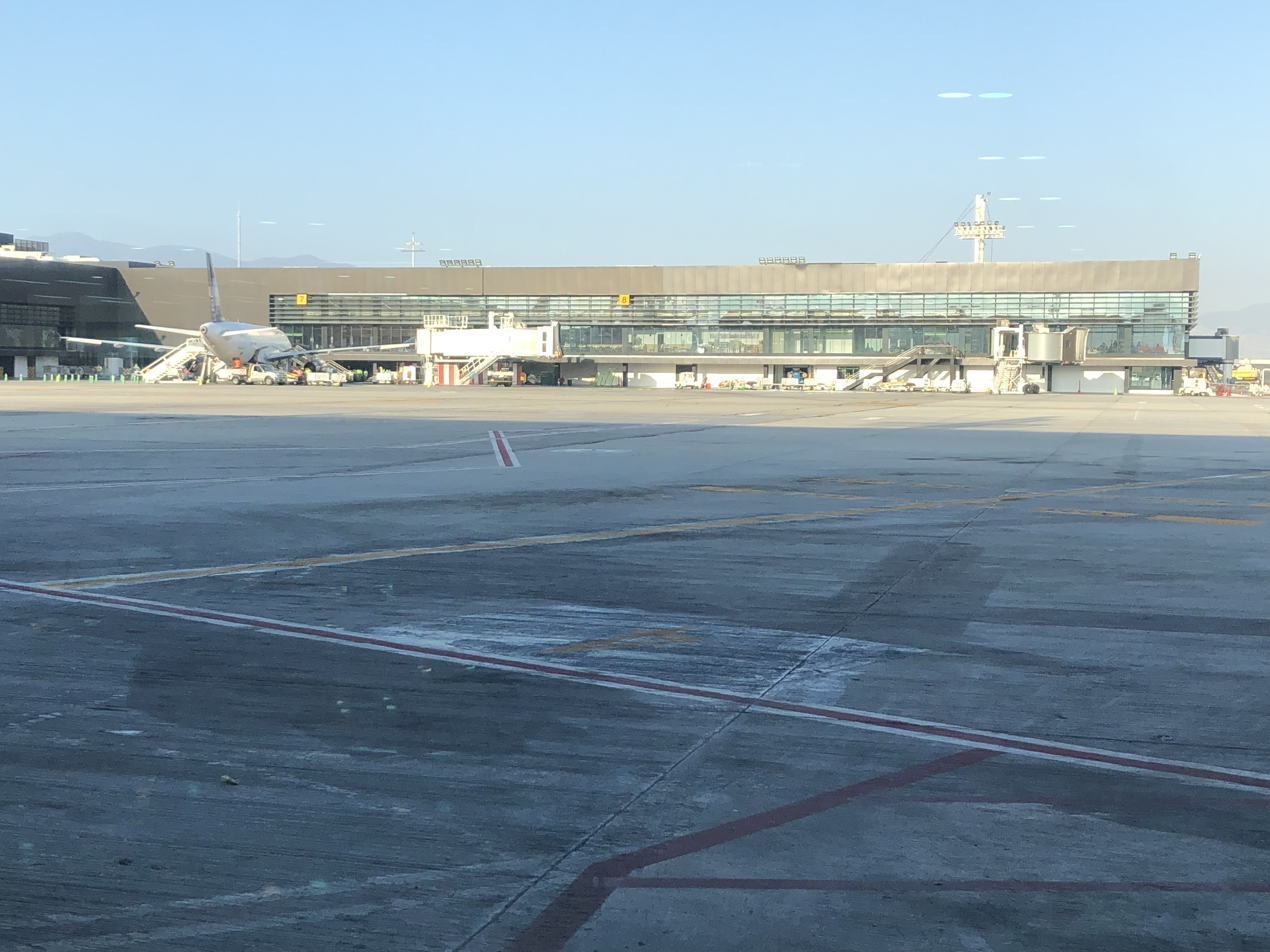
Terminal airside

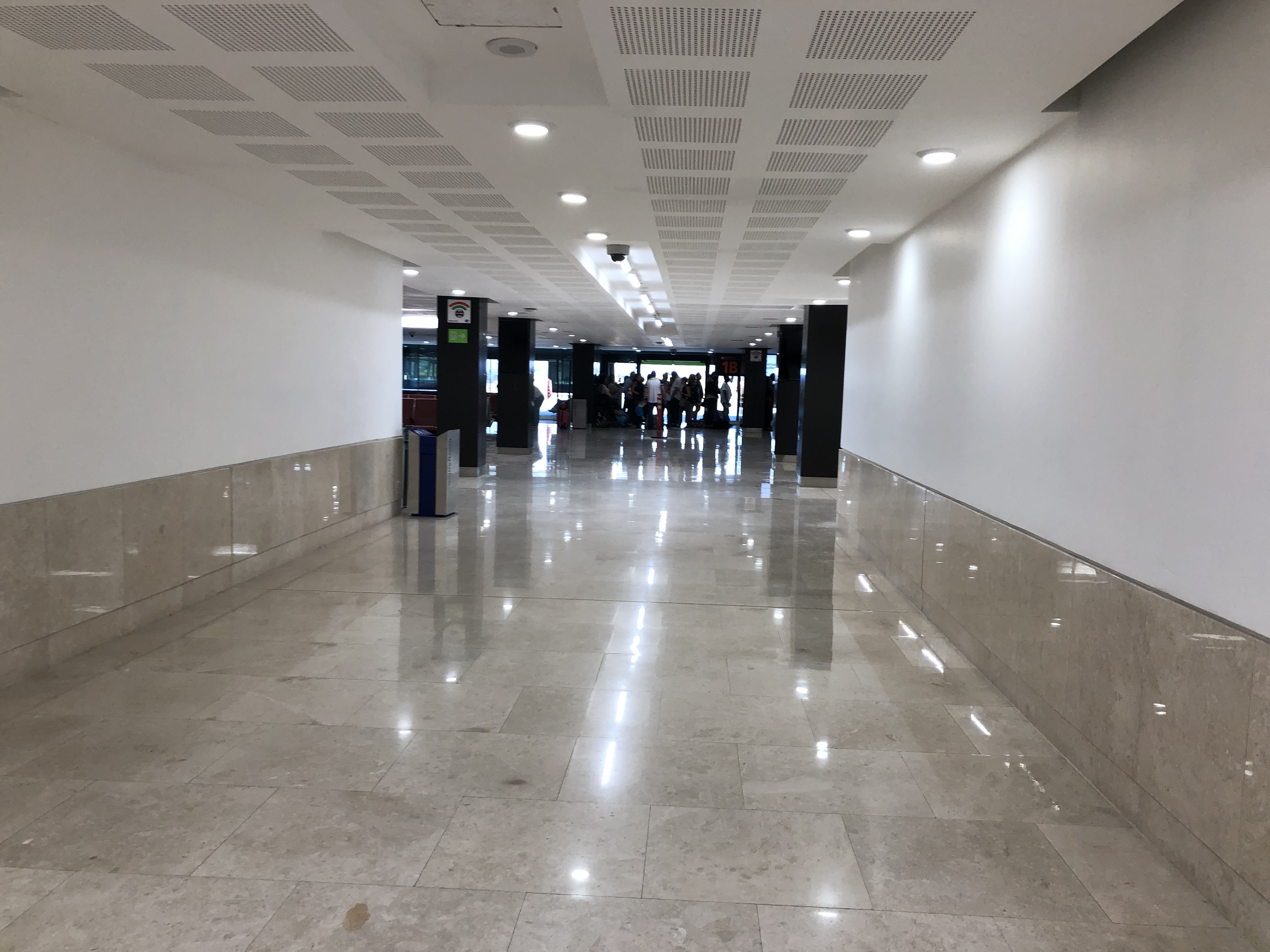
Gates 1A-1C

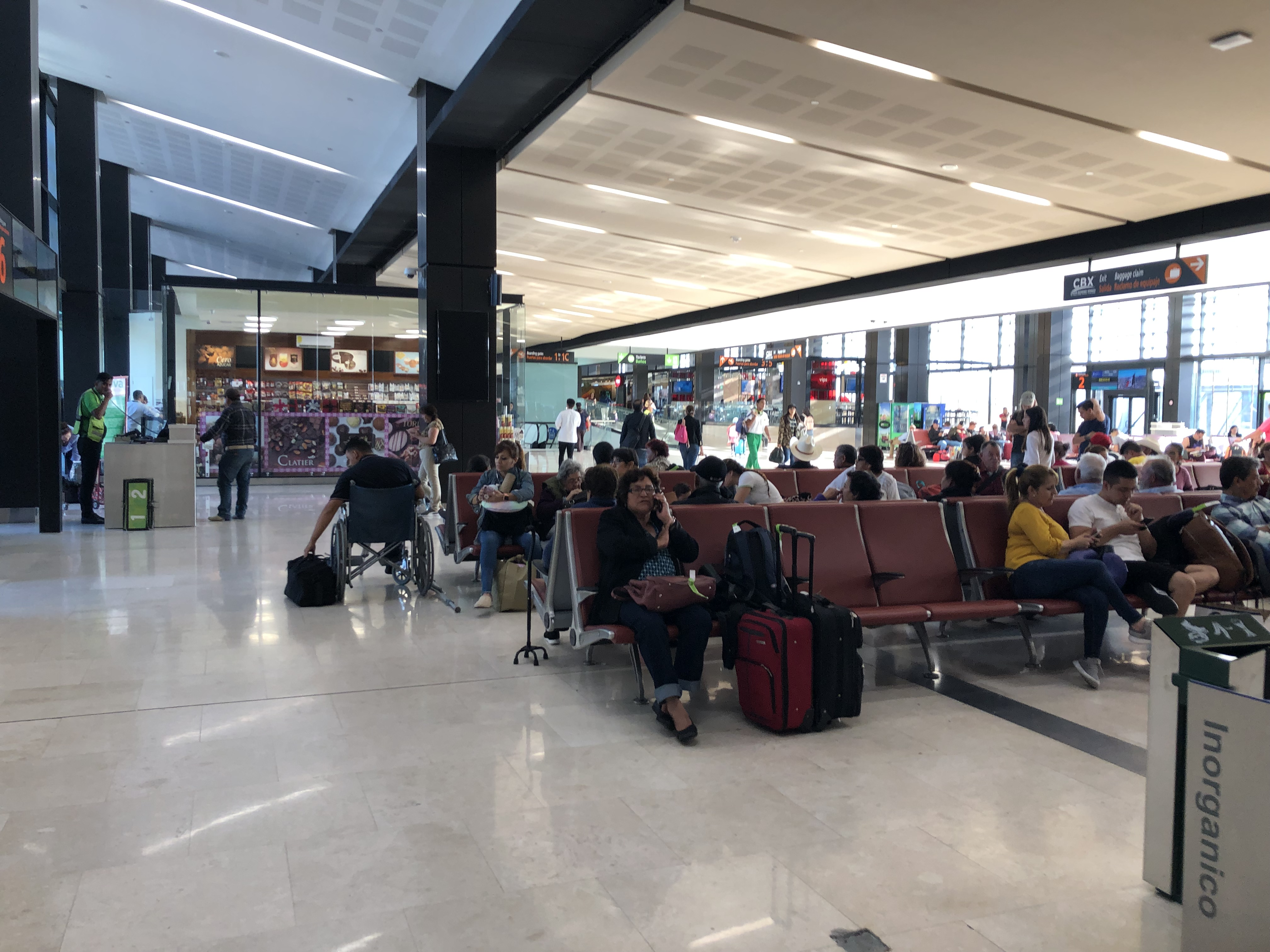
Concourse A

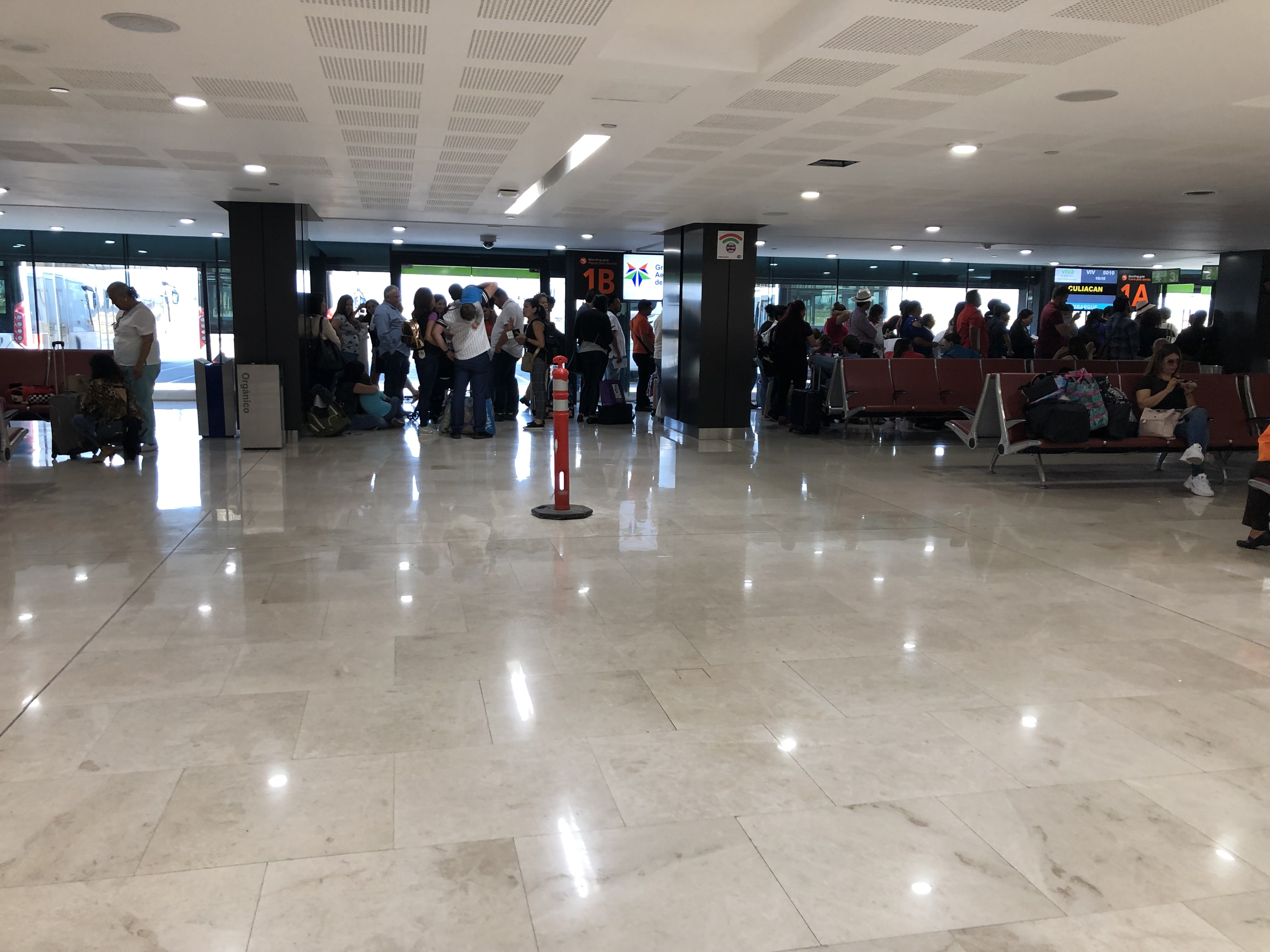
Ground floor gates at concourse A

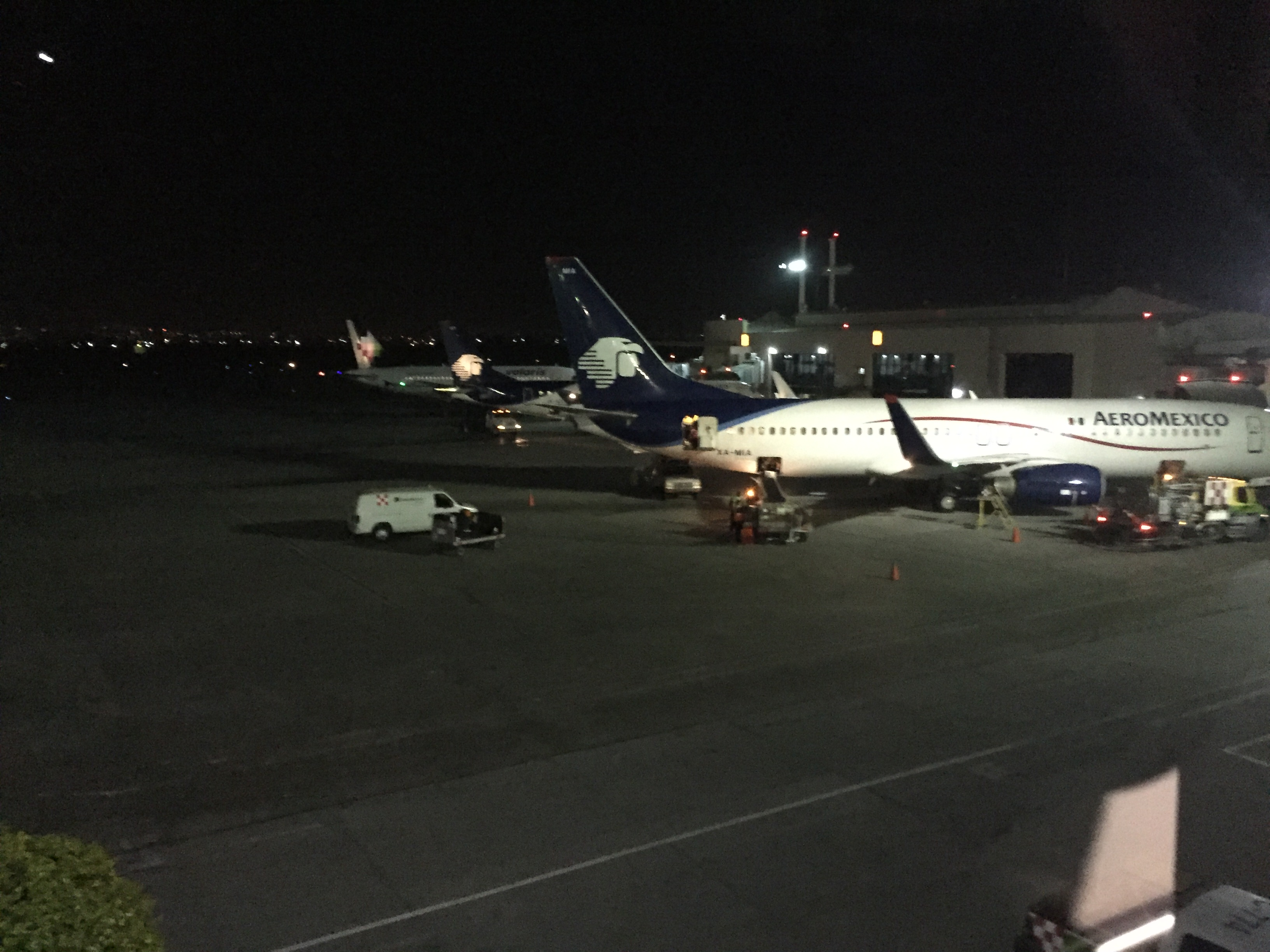
Aeromexico Boeing 737 at TIJ

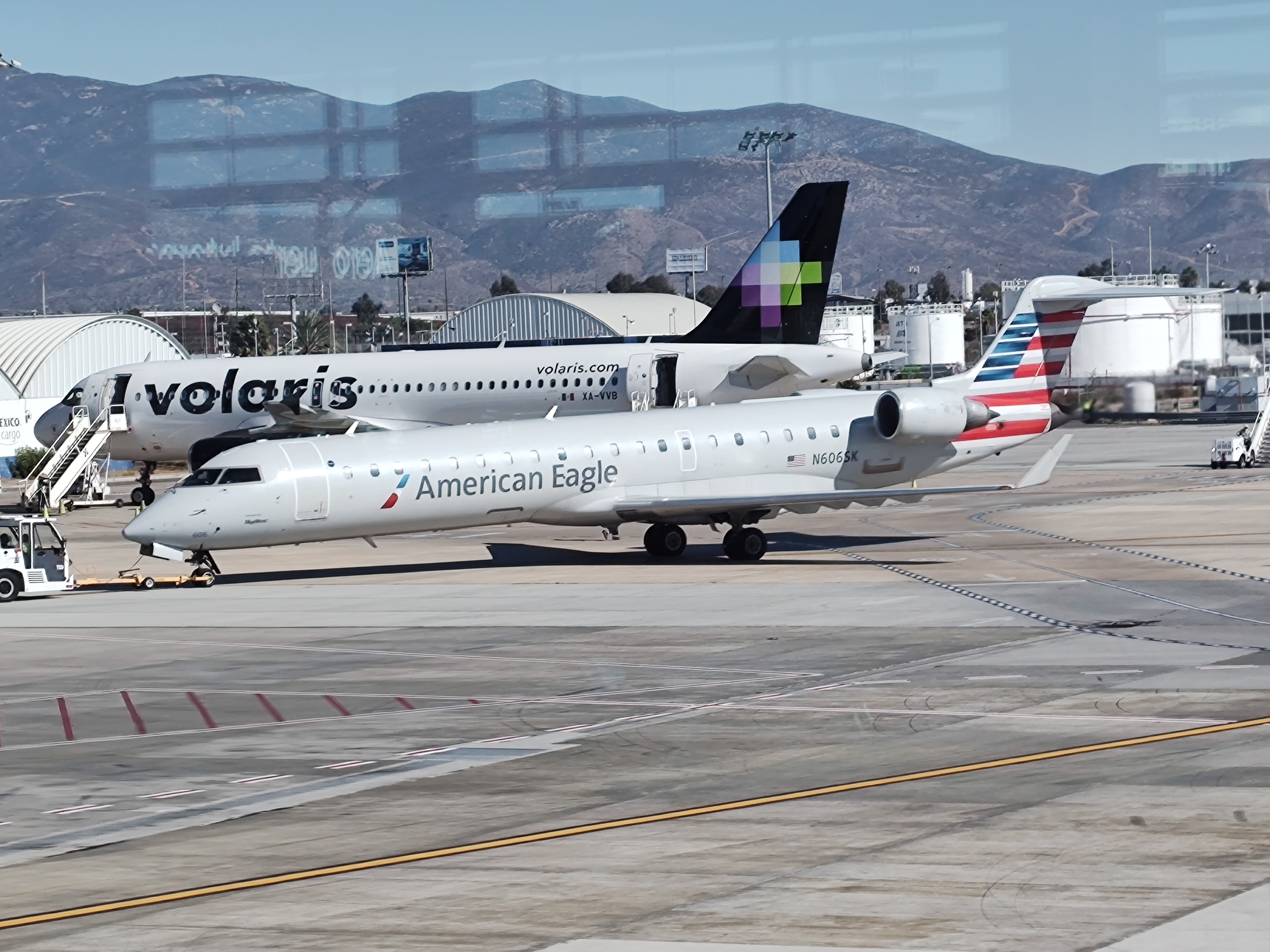
American Eagle Bombardier CRJ700 at TIJ

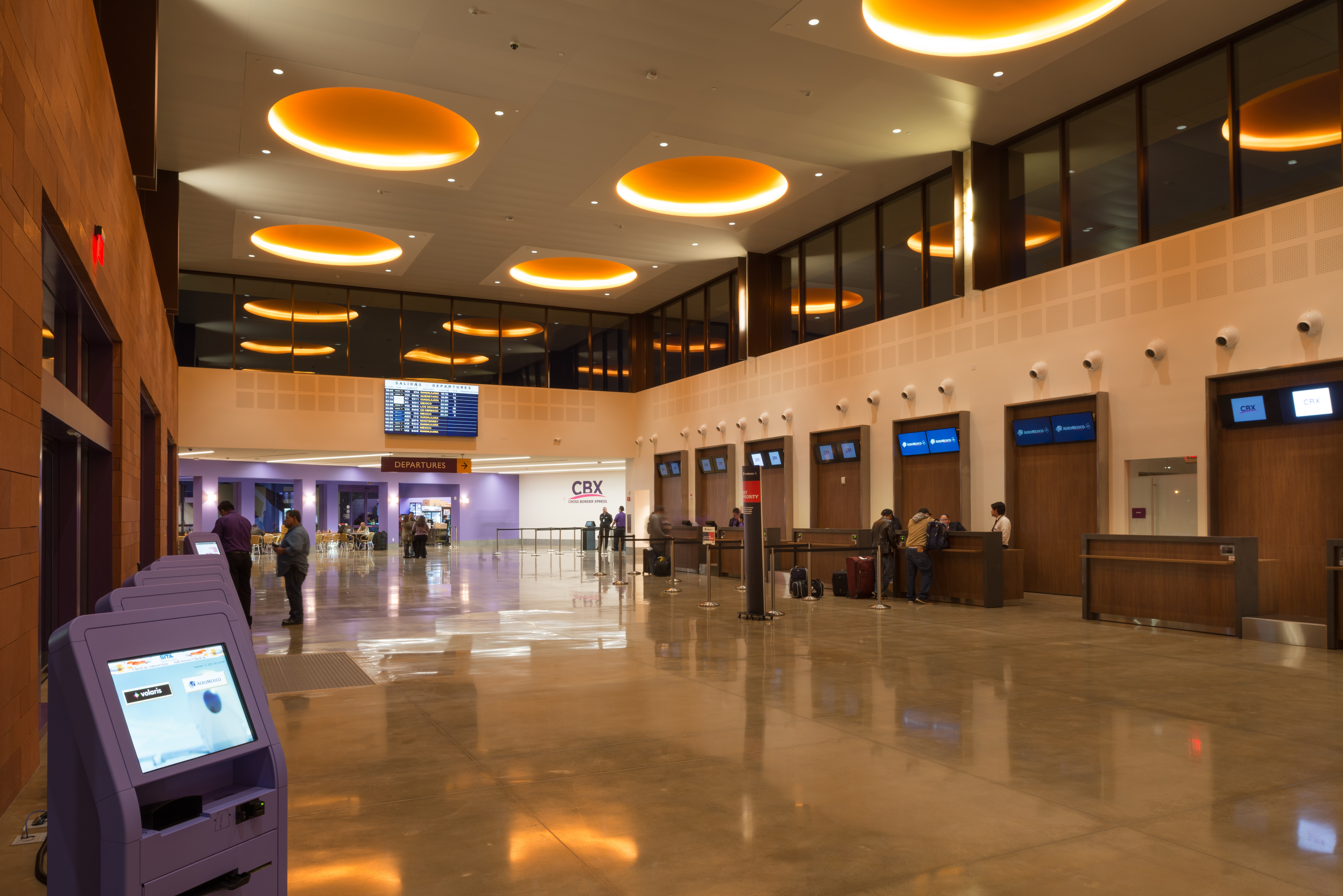
Departures hall at CBX

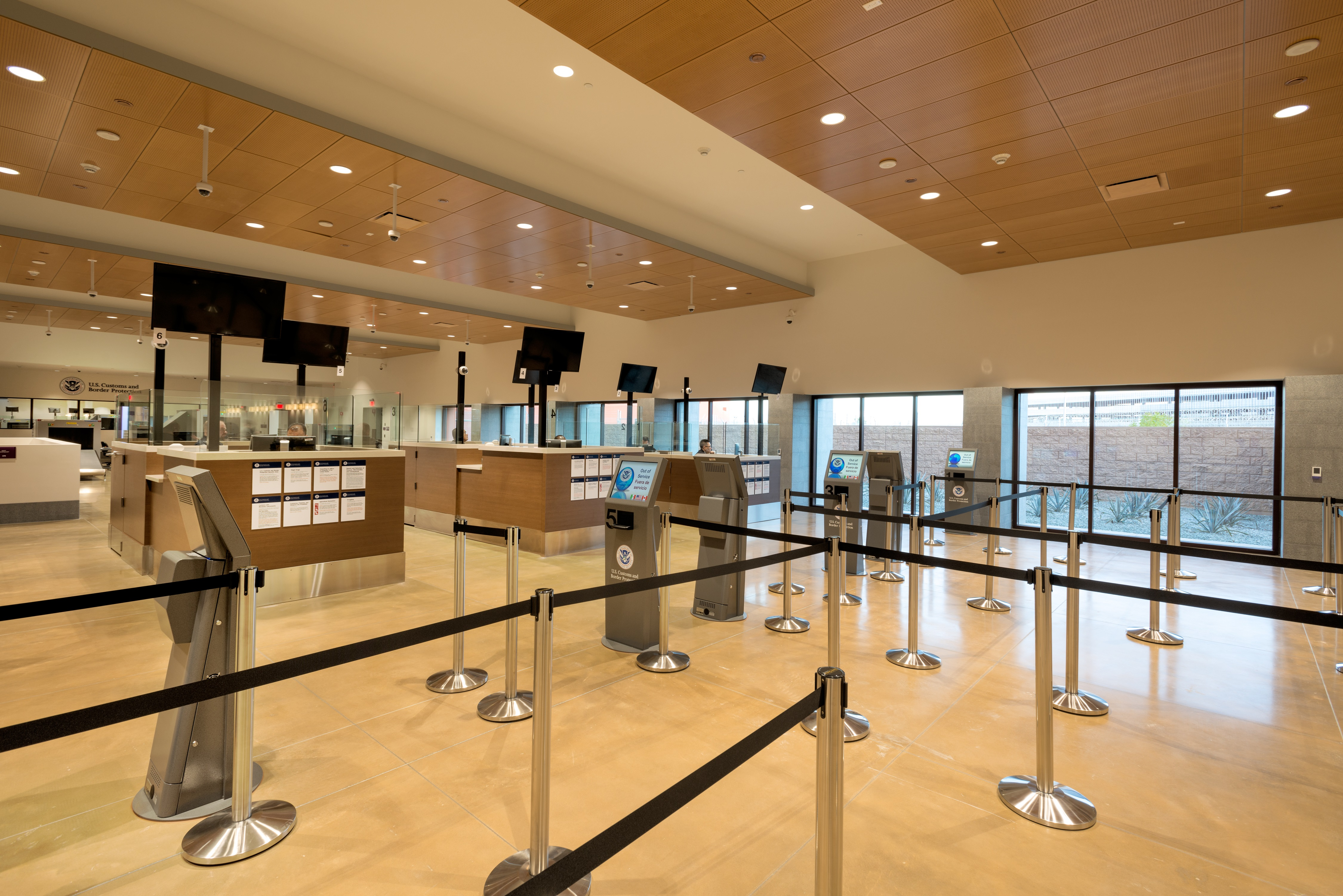
Passport control facilities at CBX

== See also ==
- List of the busiest airports in Mexico
- List of busiest airports in North America
- List of the busiest airports in Latin America
- List of Mexican military installations
