= La Quebrada (Acapulco) =

Diving tourist attraction

Coordinates: 16°50′46″N 99°54′56″W

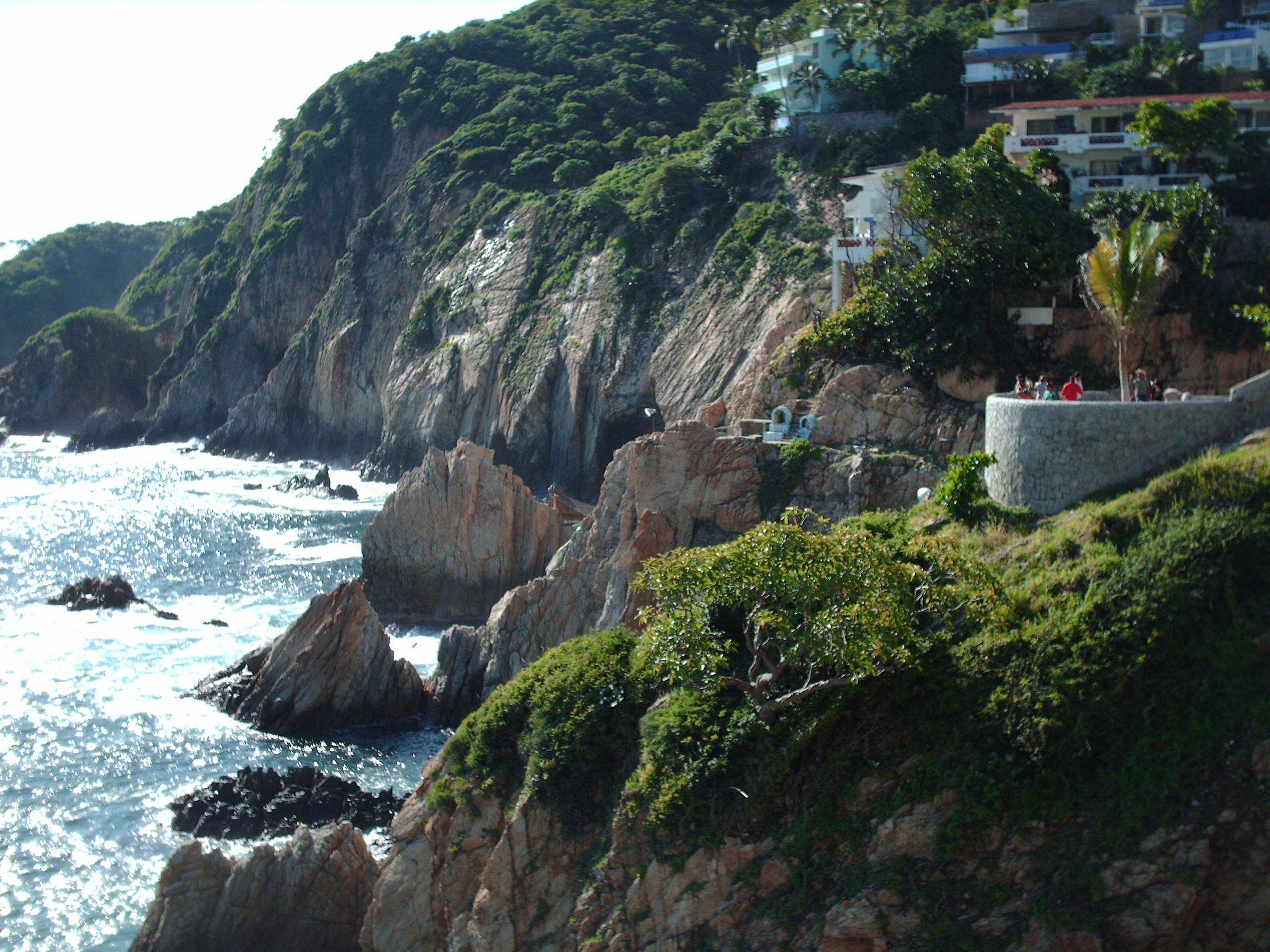
La Quebrada.

La Quebrada (Spanish for "gulch" or "ravine") is one of the most famous tourist attractions in Acapulco, Mexico. Divers entertain tourists by jumping off either of two ledges on the cliff, one that is 40 feet (12 m) high and the top one which is 80 feet (24 m) high. The divers must calculate the right moment to jump to catch an incoming wave and avoid serious injury or death. Occasionally jumpers dive with a torch. Most of the divers come from the family of Quebrada divers. Although cliff diving at La Quebrada had taken place for many years, it was not until 1934 that the La Quebrada Cliff Divers was formed.

In one of the walls of the cliff there is a path and a restaurant where tourists gather to watch the human divers and to view pelicans diving for fish.

== History ==
Due to the orography of the port, intense heat was concentrated in Acapulco, causing diseases in the population such as cholera and scurvy. The doctor of the Spanish Crown, Francisco Javier de Balmis, proposed a project to open a channel in the area that would allow air to be directed toward the center of the city, calling it “Abra de San Nicolás”. In 1799 the demolition began, but were left unfinished due to lack of financial resources.

In 1876 Colonel José María Lopetegui continued with the works to open a gap that would serve as ventilation for the port. The soldiers under his command removed several thousand cubic meters of rock. Again, the work was suspended; the lack of resources slowed progress in difficult terrain, halting the arduous work and leaving it as it is known (hence the name: "La Quebrada").

One of the cliff walls features a path with a railing, a restaurant, and an overlook, from which the world-famous cliff divers, as well as pelicans diving in search of fish, can be seen.

== Dives ==
In 1934, youths discovered how to dive from the heights of the cliff as a hobby. The threw themselves from up to 45 meters (148 ft) into a pool no more than 4 meters (13 ft) deep. Later, this feat was commercialized to entertain both domestic and foreign tourists.

The spectacle begins with the ascent of the diver up the cliff face. At 35 meters (115 ft), there is a small platform where the diver takes time to calculate the movement of the waves, the tide, and the wind and determine the appropriate time to dive. The dive takes about three seconds from launch until contact, and the diver hits the water at great speed.

The show can take place in the afternoon, utilizing the position of the sun, and at dusk. Later shows involve special illumination, where one to three divers perform with torches. Exhibitions occur at 1:00 pm, then hourly between 7:00 pm and 10:00 pm.

== See also ==
- La Quebrada Cliff Divers
