= Acapulco =

City in the Mexican state of Guerrero

- City
- Acapulco de Juárez
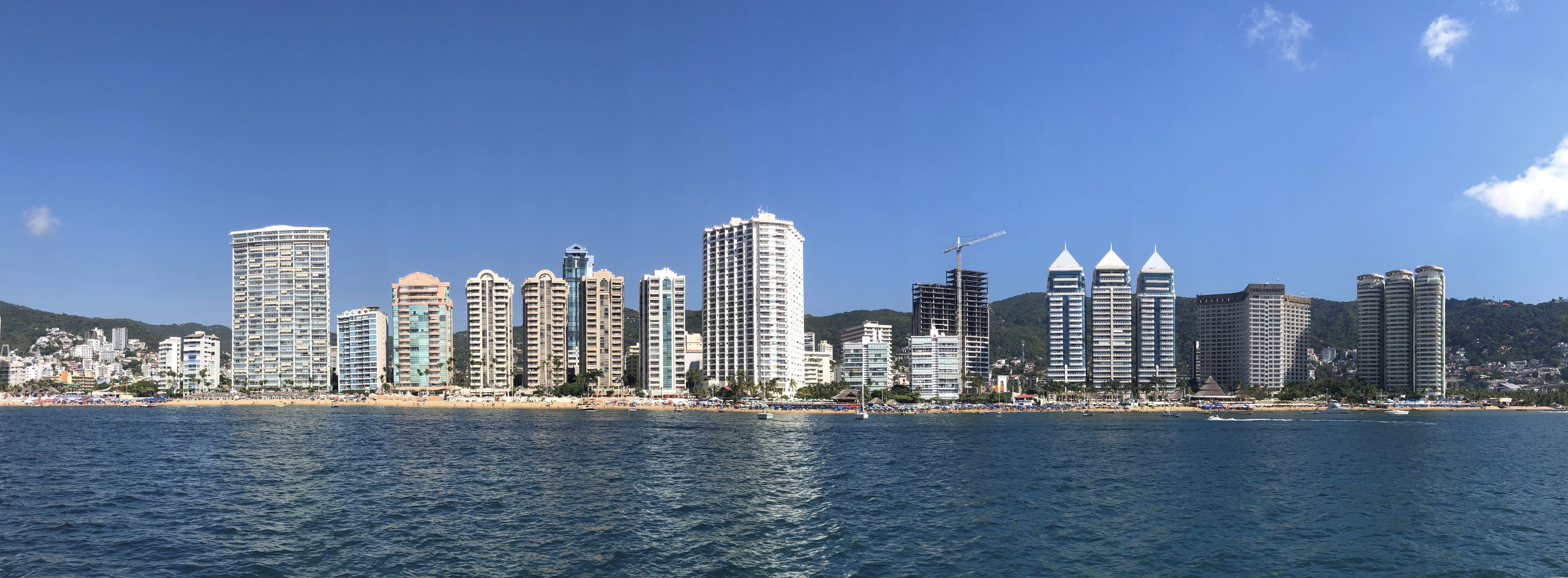
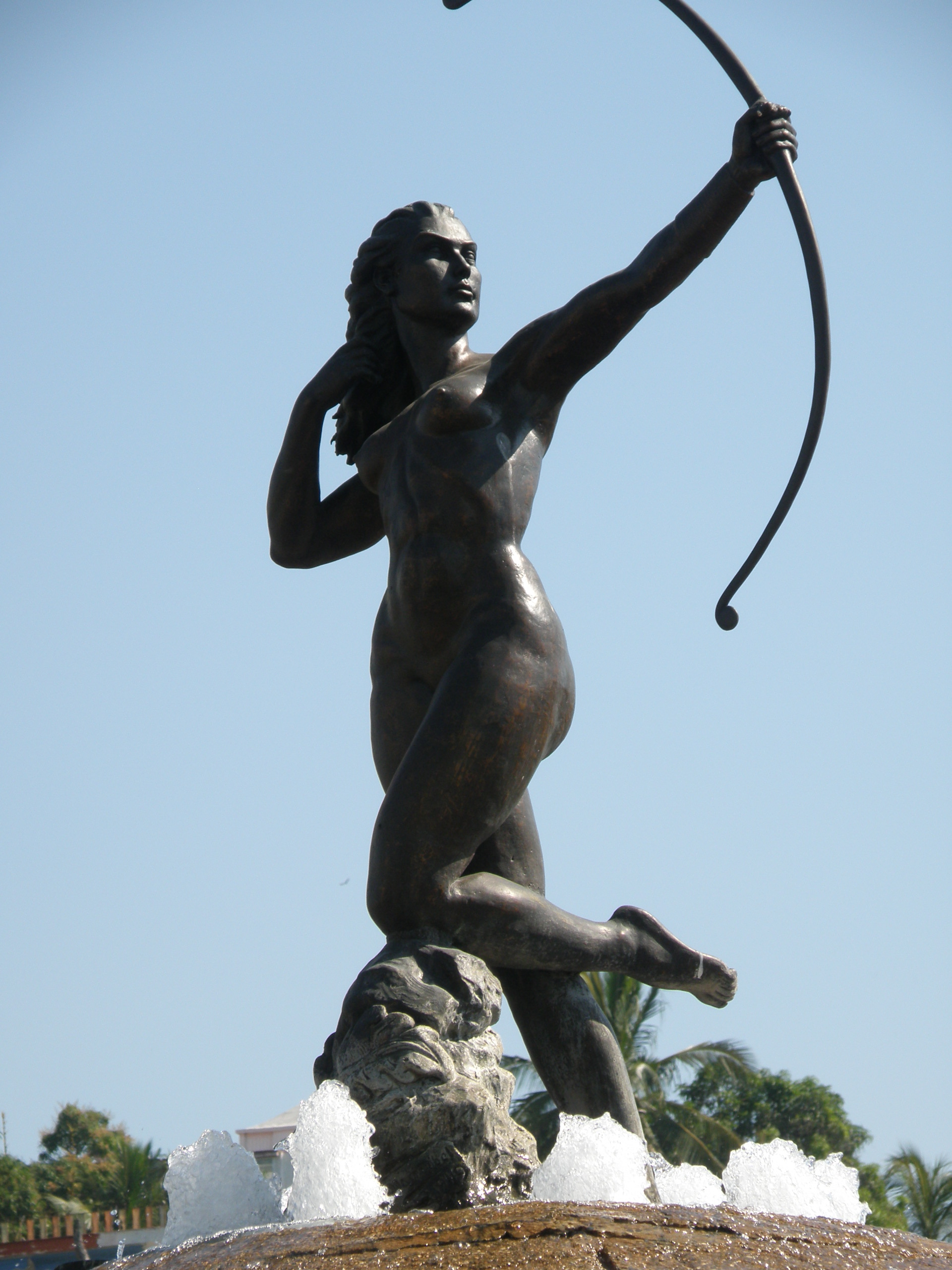
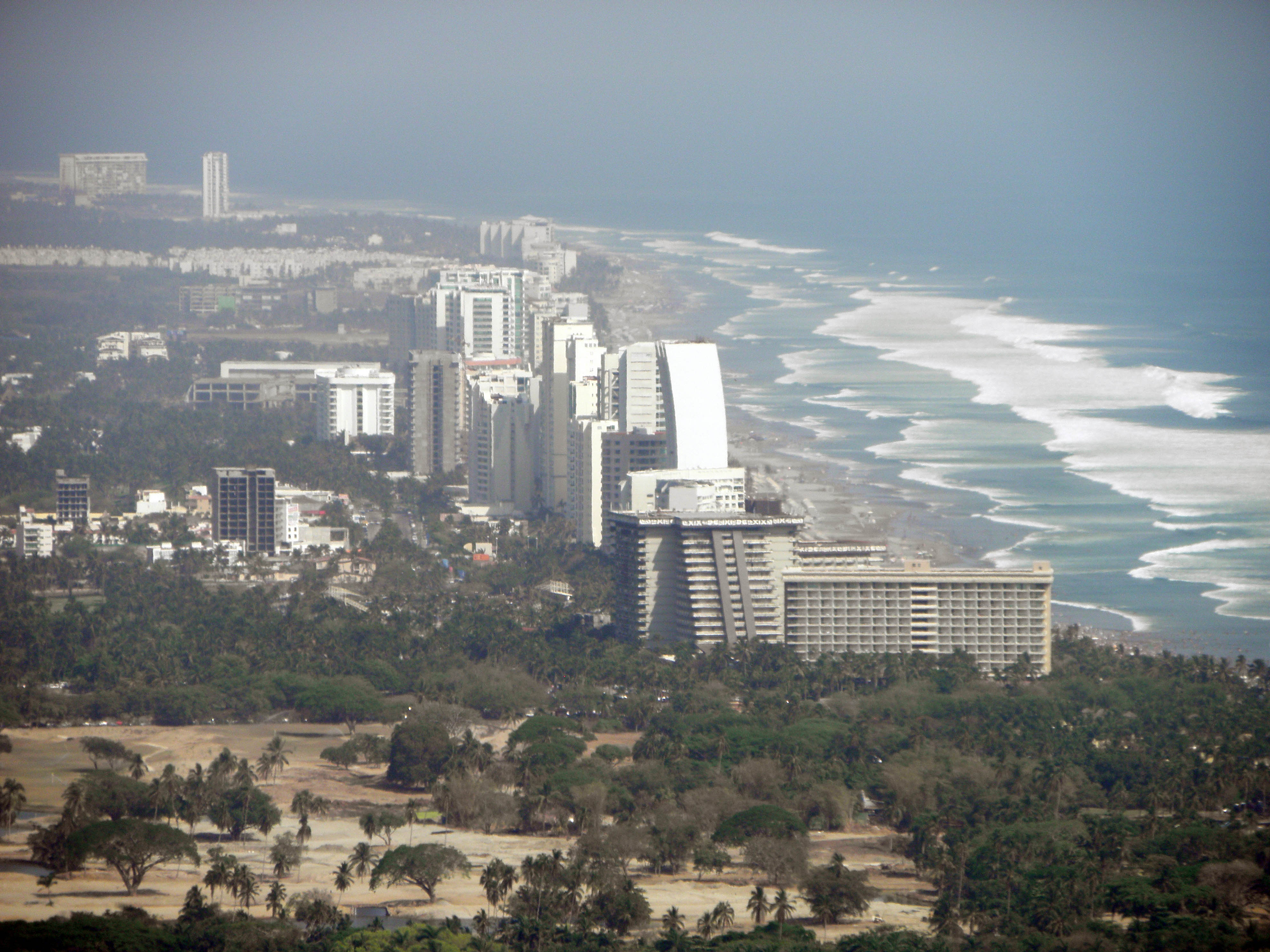
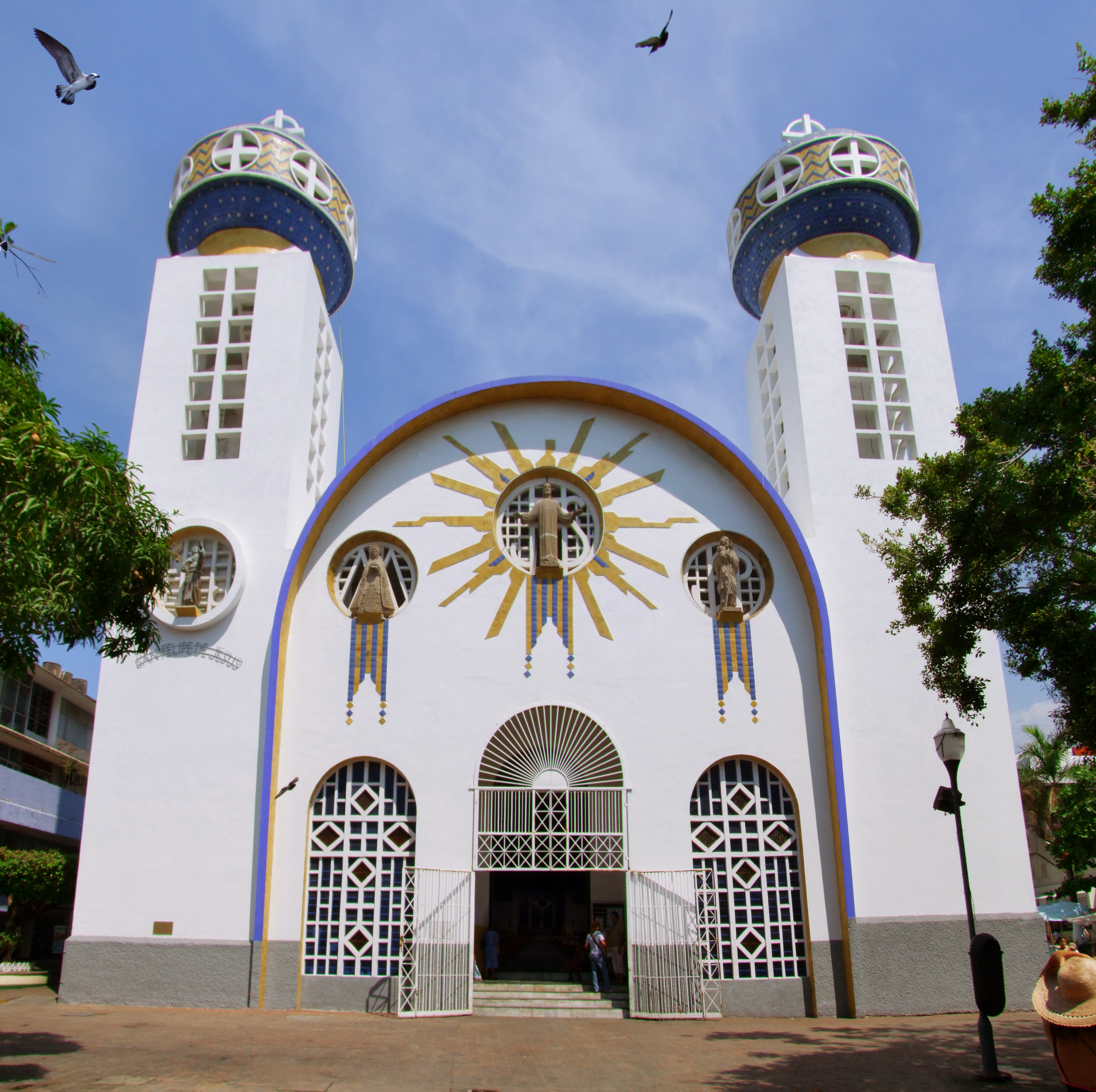
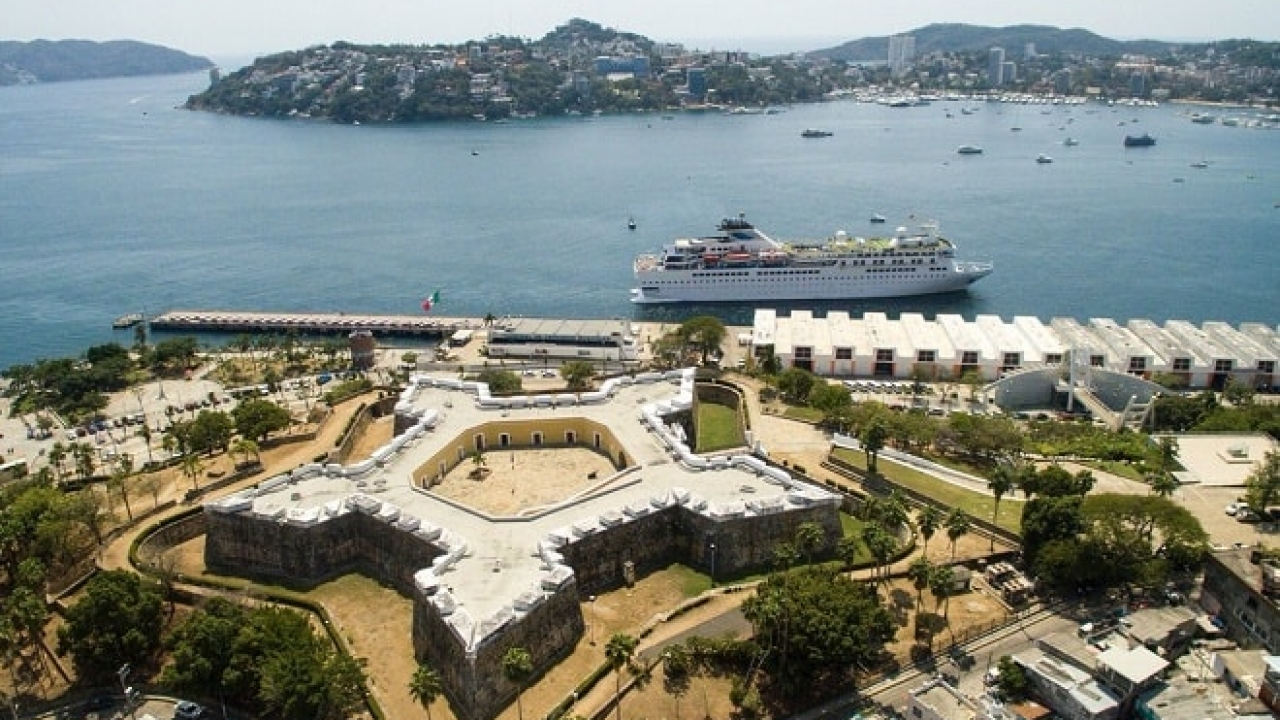
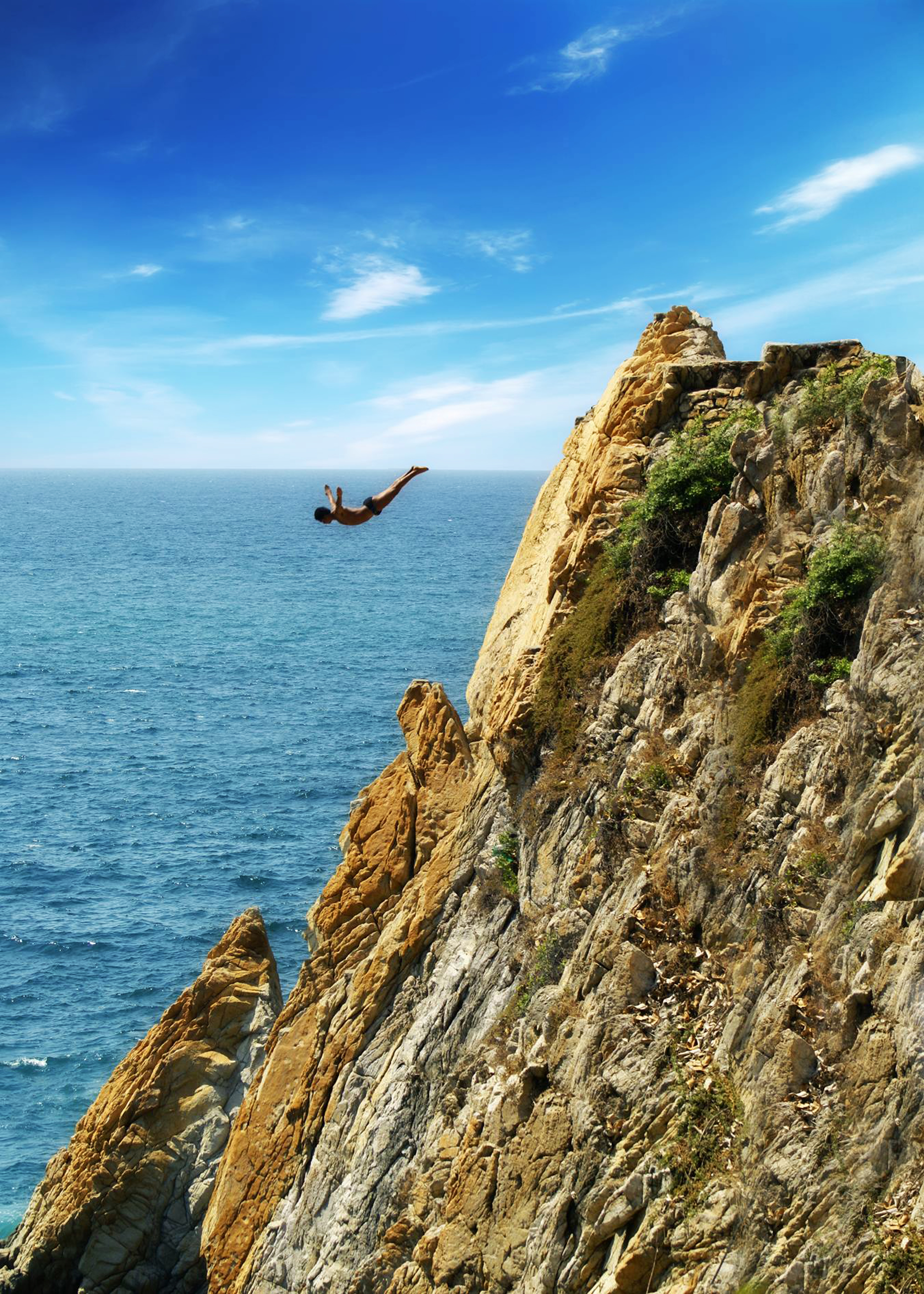
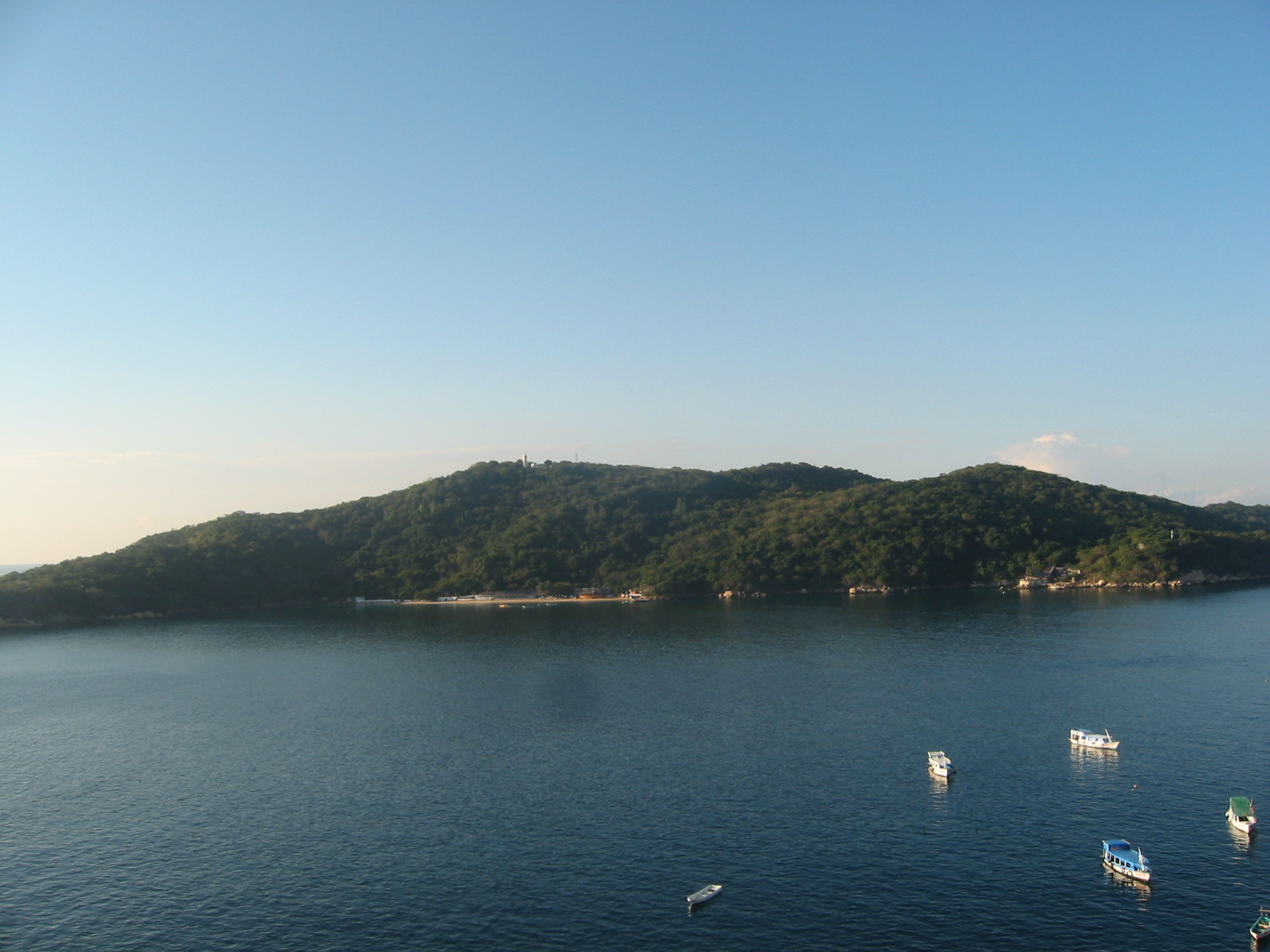
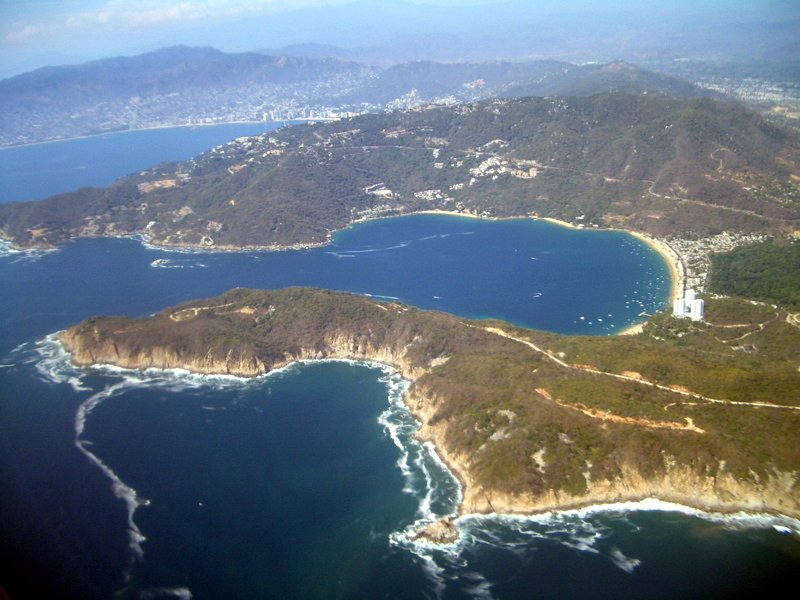
- Acapulco skyline Diana Fountain Skyscrapers in Diamante Acapulco Cathedral Fort of San Diego La Quebrada La Roqueta Island Puerto Marqués

- Coat of arms

- Location within Guerrero Location within Mexico
- Coordinates: 16°51′49″N 99°52′57″W
- Country: Mexico
- State: Guerrero
- Municipality: Acapulco
- Founded: March 12, 1550

Government
  - Municipal president: Leticia Lozano Zavala (Morena)

Area
  - City: 1,880.60 km^{2} (726.10 sq mi)
  - Urban: 85 km^{2} (33 sq mi)
  - Metro: 3,538.5 km^{2} (1,366.2 sq mi)
- Elevation (of seat): 30 m (98 ft)

Population (2020 census)
  - City: 658,609
  - Rank: 1st in Guerrero; 27th in Mexico
  - Density: 350.212/km^{2} (907.045/sq mi)
  - Metro: 852,622
- Demonyms: Acapulqueño (a); Porteño (a)

GDP (PPP, constant 2015 values)
  - Year: 2023
  - Total: $10.3 billion
  - Per capita: $10,100
- Time zone: UTC−6 (CST)
- Postal codes: 39300–39937
- Area code: 744
- Website: Official website (in Spanish)

Acapulco de Juárez (Spanish: [akaˈpulko ðe ˈxwaɾes]), commonly called Acapulco (/ˌækəˈpʊlkoʊ/ AK-ə-PUUL-koh, US also /ˌɑːk-/ AHK-; Nahuatl languages: Acapolco), is a city and major seaport in the state of Guerrero on the Pacific coast of Mexico, 380 kilometres (240 mi) south of Mexico City. Located on a deep, semicircular bay, Acapulco has been a port since the early colonial period in Mexico's history. It is a port of call for shipping and cruise lines running between Panama and San Francisco, California. The city of Acapulco is the largest in the state, larger than the state capital Chilpancingo. Acapulco is also Mexico's largest beach and balneario resort city. Acapulco de Juárez, Guerrero is the municipal seat of the municipality of Acapulco, Guerrero.

The city is one of Mexico's oldest beach resorts, coming into prominence in the 1940s through the 1960s as a getaway for Hollywood stars and millionaires. Acapulco was once a popular tourist resort, but due to a massive upsurge in gang violence and homicides since 2014, Acapulco no longer attracts many foreign tourists, and most now only come from within Mexico itself. It is both the ninth deadliest city in Mexico and the tenth-deadliest city in the world in 2022; the US government has warned its citizens not to travel there. In 2016 there were 918 murders, and the homicide rate was one of the highest in the world: 103 per 100,000 people. In September 2018, the city's entire police force was disarmed by the military, due to suspicions that it had been infiltrated by drug gangs.

The resort area is divided into three parts: the north end of the bay and beyond is the "traditional" area, which encompasses the area from Parque Papagayo through the Zócalo and to the beaches of Caleta and Caletilla, the main part of the bay known as "Zona Dorada" ('golden zone' in Spanish), where the celebrities in the mid-20th century vacationed, and the south end, "Diamante" ('diamond' in Spanish), which is dominated by newer luxury high-rise hotels and condominiums.

The name "Acapulco, Guerrero" comes from Nahuatl language Aca-pōl-co, and means "where the reeds were destroyed or washed away" or "at the big reeds", which inspired the city's seal, which is an Aztec-type glyph showing two hands breaking reeds.

The "de Juárez" was added to the official name in 1885 to honor Benito Juárez, former president of Mexico (1806–1872). The island and municipality of Capul, in the Philippines, derives its name from Acapulco, Guerrero. Acapulco, Guerrero was the eastern end of the trans-Pacific sailing route from Acapulco to Manila, in what was then a Spanish colony.

== History ==
=== Pre-Columbian ===
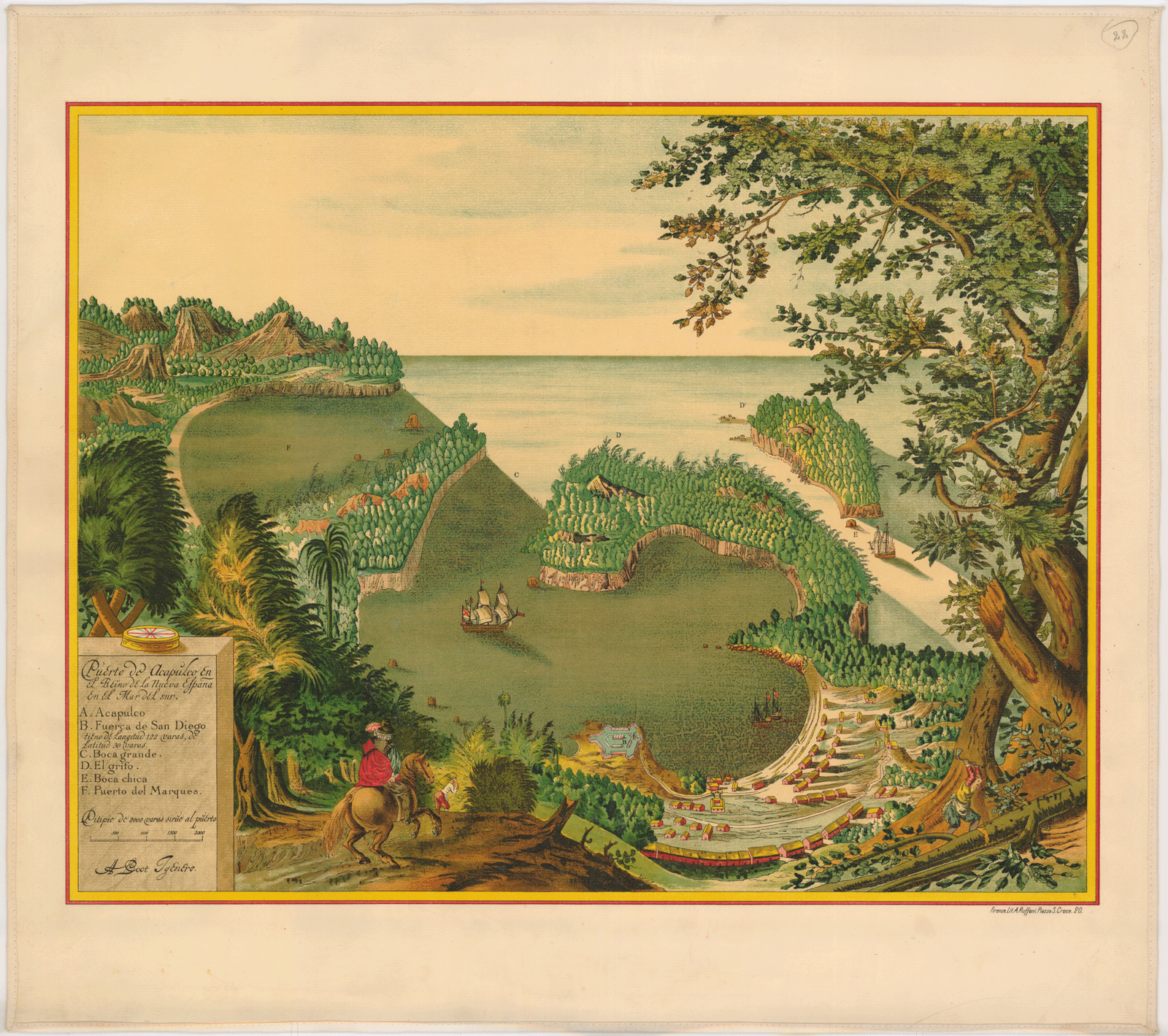
A 1628 relief atlas of Acapulco Bay.

By the 8th century, around the Acapulco Bay area, there was a small culture which would first be dominated by the Olmecs, then by a number of others during the pre-Hispanic period before it ended in the 1520s. At Acapulco Bay itself, there were two Olmec sites, one by Playa Larga and the other on a hill known as El Guitarrón. Olmec influence caused the small spread-out villages here to coalesce into larger entities and build ceremonial centers.

Later, Teotihuacan influence came to the area via Cuernavaca and Chilpancingo. Then Mayan influence arrived from the Isthmus of Tehuantepec and through what is now Oaxaca. This history is known through the archaeological artifacts that have been found here, especially at Playa Hornos, Pie de la Cuesta, and Tambuco.

In the 11th century, new waves of migration of Nahuas, including the Coixcas, came through here. These people were the antecedents of the Aztecs. In the later 15th century, after four years of military struggle, Acapulco became part of the Aztec Empire during the reign of Ahuizotl (1486–1502). It was annexed to a tributary province centered at Tecpan de Galeana. However, this was only transitory, as the Aztecs could only establish an unorganized military post at the city's outskirts. The city was in territory under control of the Yopis, who continued defending it and living there until the arrival of the Spanish in the 1520s.

=== 16th century ===
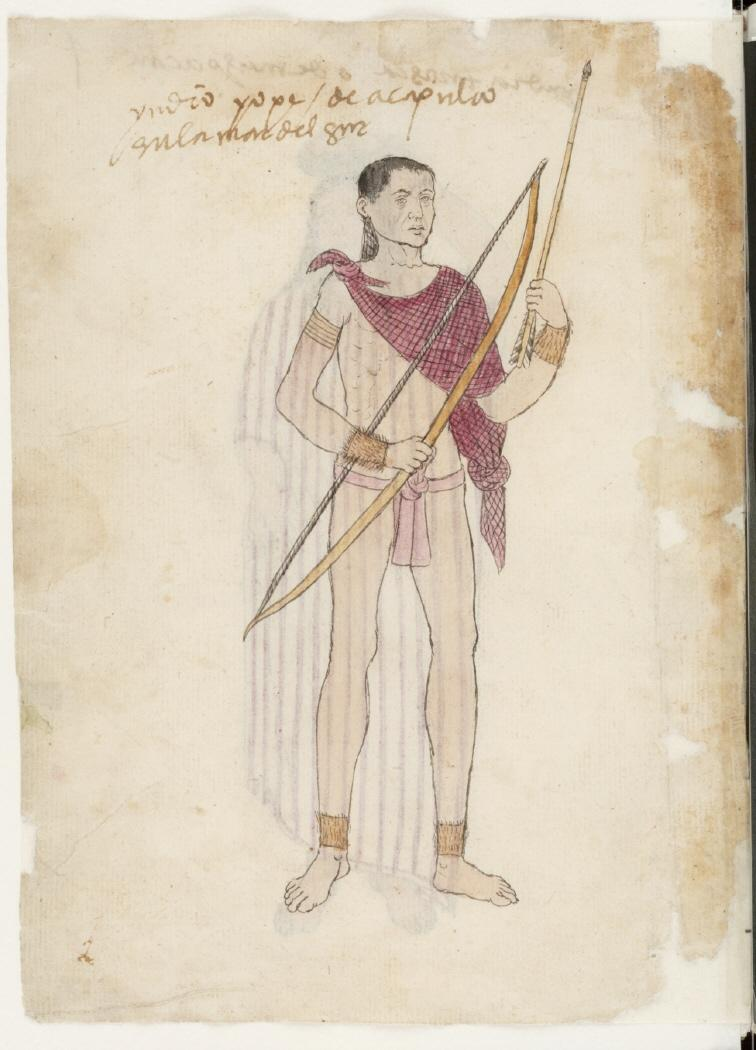
Codex Tudela: "Acapulco's Yope Indian, at the South Sea".

There are two stories about how Acapulco bay was discovered by Europeans. The first states that two years after the Spanish conquest of the Aztec Empire, Hernán Cortés sent explorers west to find gold. The explorers had subdued this area after 1523, and Captain Saavedra Cerón was authorized by Cortés to found a settlement here. The other states that the bay was discovered on December 13, 1526, by a small ship named the El Tepache Santiago captained by Santiago Guevara.

The first encomendero was established in 1525 at Cacahuatepec, which is still part of the modern Acapulco municipality. In 1531, a number of Spaniards, most notably Juan Rodriguez de Villafuerte, left the Oaxaca coast and founded the village of Villafuerte where the city of Acapulco now stands. Villafuerte was unable to subdue the local native peoples, and this eventually resulted in the Yopa Rebellion in the region of Cuautepec. Hernán Cortés was obligated to send Vasco Porcayo to negotiate with the indigenous people giving concessions. The province of Acapulco became the encomendero of Rodriguez de Villafuerte who received taxes in the form of cocoa, cotton and corn.

Cortés established Acapulco as a major port by the early 1530s, with the first major road between Mexico City and the port constructed by 1531. The wharf, named Marqués, was constructed by 1533 between Bruja Point and Diamond Point. Soon after, the area was made an "alcadia" (major province or town).

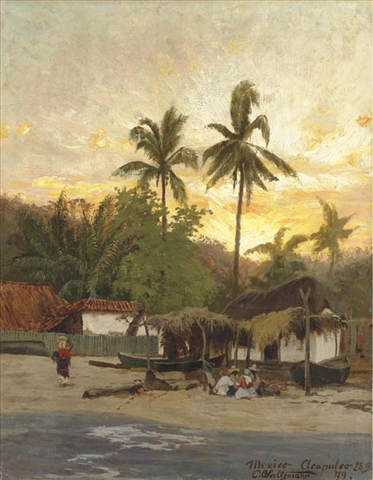
View of Acapulco, 1879, oil painting by Carl Saltzmann.

Spanish trade with the Far East gave Acapulco a prominent place in the economy of New Spain. In 1550, thirty Spanish families were sent from Mexico City to establish a permanent base of European residents. Galleons began arriving from Asia in 1565, and the Manila-Acapulco trade route made Acapulco the second most important port in New Spain after Veracruz. In 1573, the Crown granted a monopoly on trade with Manila and Acapulco became a center of communication between Europe, Asia, and the Americas introducing many American crops from Spanish colonies westward to Asia: the native Senna alata itself is given the Filipino name of akapulko.

=== 17th–19th centuries ===
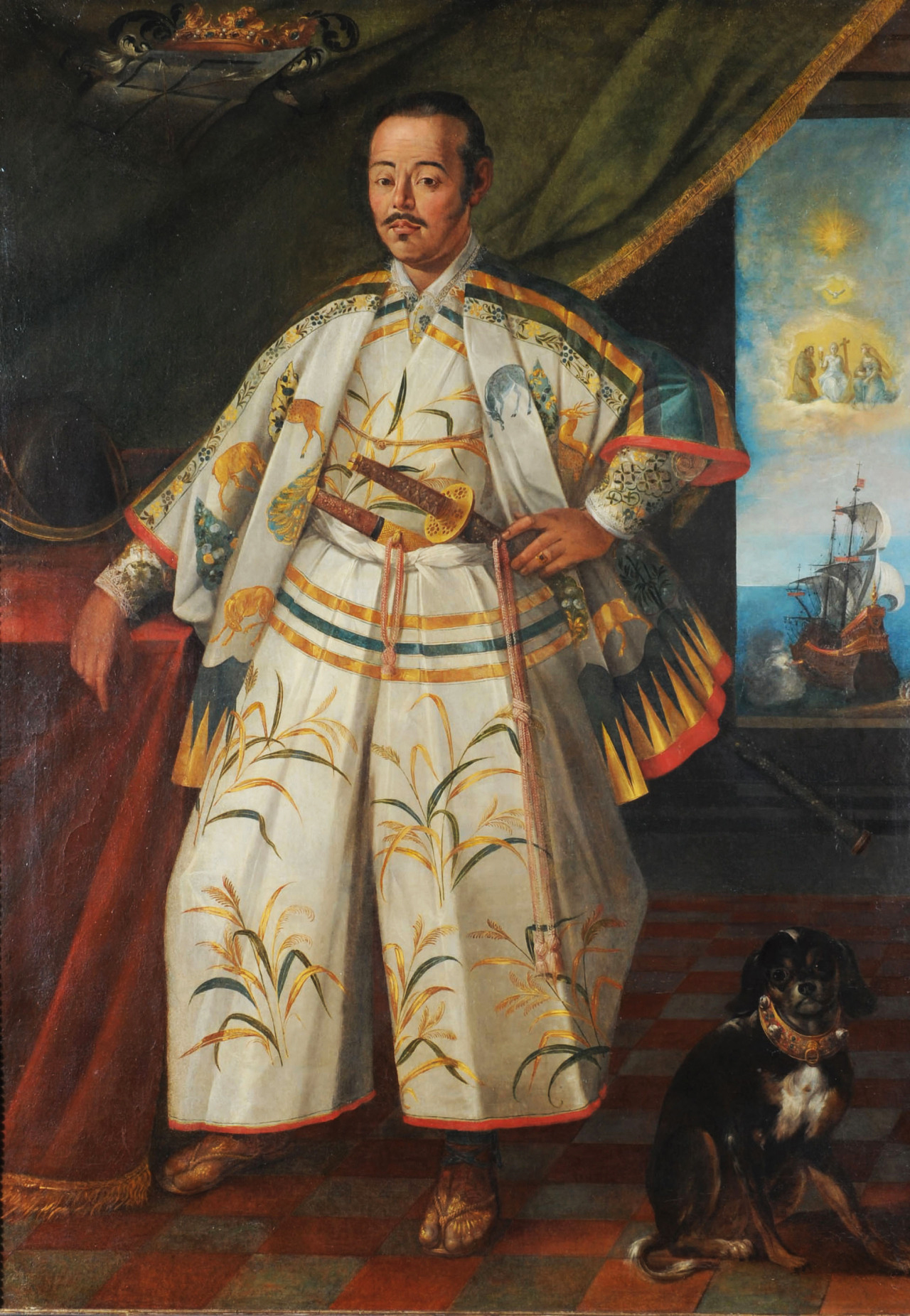
Hasekura Tsunenaga; the Japanese samurai who led the delegation to Mexico.

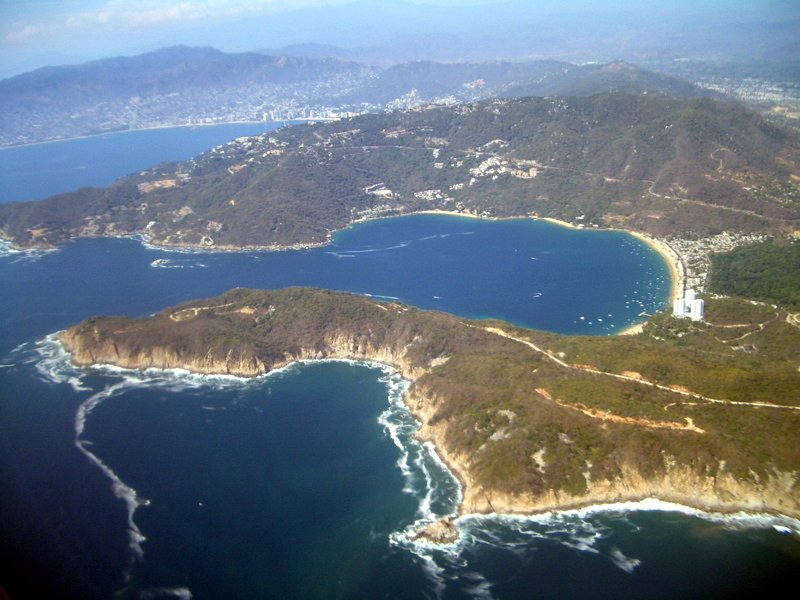
Puerto Marqués.

On January 25, 1614, a delegation led by samurai Hasekura Tsunenaga, which included over one hundred Japanese Christians as well as twenty-two samurai under the shōgun Tokugawa Ieyasu, arrived from Japan to Acapulco as part of a mission to form closer relations with Catholic Europe. A fight soon broke out in which a Japanese samurai stabbed a Spanish colonial soldier in Acapulco. This was witnessed and recorded by historian Chimalpahin, who was the grandson of an Aztec nobleman. Some of Tsunenaga's delegation would stay and marry with the locals.

The galleon trade made its yearly run from the mid-16th century until the early 19th. The luxury items it brought to New Spain attracted the attention of English and Dutch pirates, such as Francis Drake, Henry Morgan and Thomas Cavendish, who called it "The Black Ship". A Dutch fleet invaded Acapulco in 1615, destroying much of the town before being driven off. The Fort of San Diego was built the following year to protect the port and the cargo of arriving ships. The fort was destroyed by an earthquake in 1776 and was rebuilt between 1778 and 1783.

At the beginning of the 19th century, King Charles IV declared Acapulco a Ciudad Official and it became an essential part of the Spanish Crown. However, not long after, the Mexican War of Independence began. In 1810, José María Morelos y Pavón attacked and burnt down the city, after he defeated royalist commander Francisco Parés at the Battle of Tres Palos. The independence of Mexico in 1821 ended the run of the Manila Galleon. Acapulco's importance as a port recovered during the California Gold Rush in the mid-19th-century, with ships going to and coming from Panama stopping here. This city was besieged on April 19, 1854 by Antonio López de Santa Anna after Guerrero's leadership had rebelled by issuing the Plan de Ayutla. After an unsuccessful week of fighting, Santa Anna retreated.

=== 20th century ===
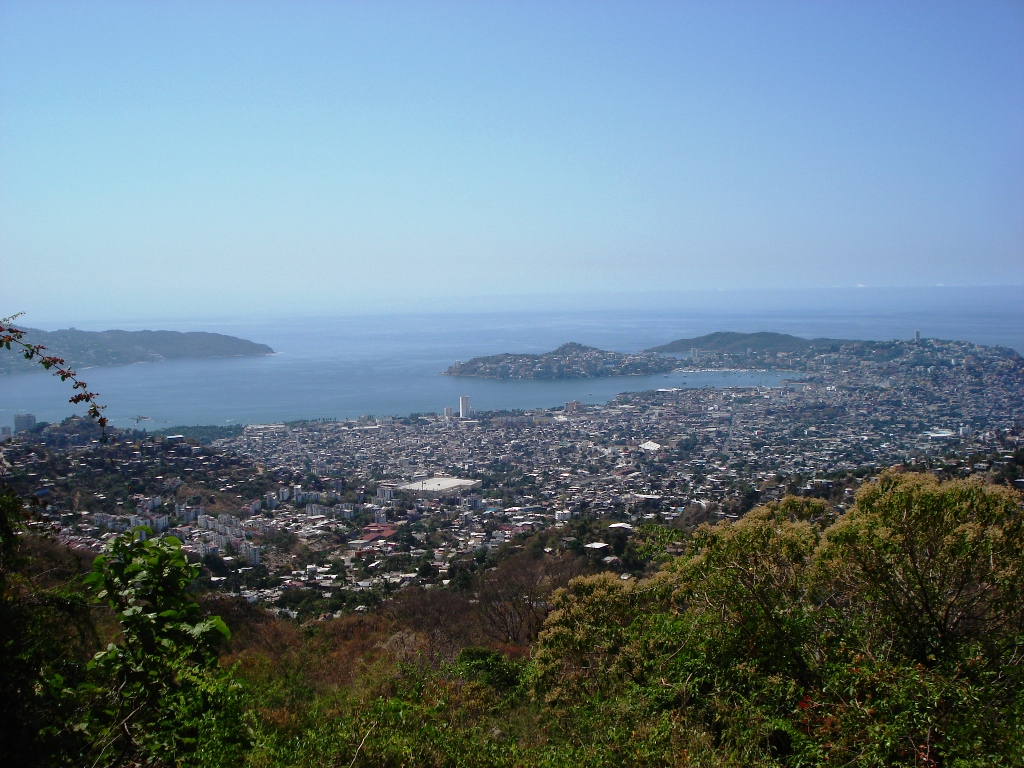
The Bay of Acapulco from the top of Palma Sola.

In 1911, revolutionary forces took over the main plaza of Acapulco. In 1920, the Prince of Wales (the future King Edward VIII) visited the area. Impressed by what he saw, he recommended the place to his compatriots in Europe, making it popular with the elite there. Much of the original hotel and trading infrastructure was built by a businessman named Albert B. Pullen from Corrigan, Texas, in the area now known as Old Acapulco. In 1933, Carlos Barnard started the first section of Hotel El Mirador, with 12 rooms on the cliffs of La Quebrada. Albert Pullen built the Las Americas Hotel. In the late 1930s, "La Fraccionadora de Acapulco, S.A." (FASA), consisting of William Pullen, Anacleto Martínez, Juan M. Salcedo, and Wolf Schoenburg, who was especially instrumental, started tourism development in earnest.

In the mid-1940s, the first commercial wharf and warehouses were built. In the early 1950s, President Miguel Alemán Valdés upgraded the port's infrastructure, installing electrical lines, drainage systems, roads and the first highway to connect the port with Mexico City.

The economy grew and foreign investment increased with it. During the 1950s, Acapulco became the fashionable place for millionaire Hollywood stars such as Elizabeth Taylor, Frank Sinatra, Eddie Fisher and Brigitte Bardot. The 1963 Hollywood movie Fun in Acapulco, starring Elvis Presley, is set in Acapulco although the filming took place in the United States. Former swing musician Teddy Stauffer, the so-called "Mister Acapulco", was a hotel manager ("Villa Vera", "Casablanca"), who attracted many celebrities to Acapulco.

From a population of only 4,000 or 5,000 in the 1940s, by the early 1960s, Acapulco had a population of about 50,000. In 1958, the Diocese of Acapulco was created by Pope Pius XII. It became an archdiocese in 1983.

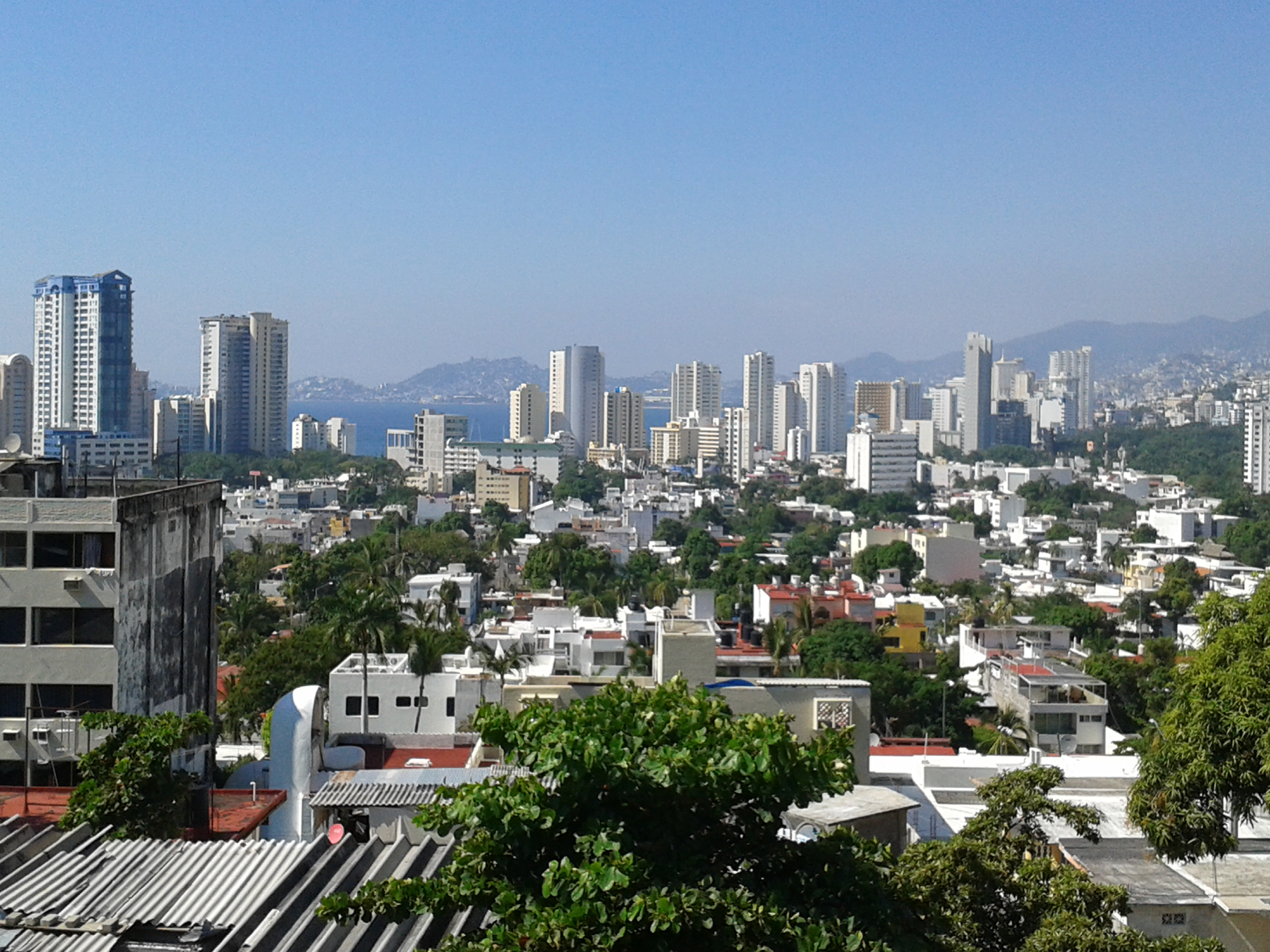
Acapulco skyline.

During the 1960s and 1970s, new hotel resorts were built, and accommodation and transport were made cheaper. It was no longer necessary to be a millionaire to spend a holiday in Acapulco; the foreign and Mexican middle class could now afford to travel here. However, as more hotels were built in the south part of the bay, the old hotels of the 1950s lost their grandeur. For the 1968 Summer Olympics in neighboring Mexico City, Acapulco hosted the sailing (then yachting) events.

In the 1970s, there was a significant expansion of the port.

The Miss Universe 1978 pageant took place in the city. In 1983, singer-songwriter Juan Gabriel wrote the song "Amor eterno", which pays homage to Acapulco. The song was first and most famously recorded by Rocío Dúrcal. Additionally, Acapulco is the hometown of actress, singer, and comedian Aída Pierce, who found fame during the 1980s, 1990s and the first decade of the 21st century.

Construction of the Cuernavaca–Acapulco section of Federal Highway 95D, commonly known as the Autopista del Sol, began in 1989 and was completed and inaugurated in 1993. Together with the Mexico City–Cuernavaca motorway, it substantially shortened the journey between Mexico City and Acapulco and helped establish Acapulco as a popular weekend destination for residents of the capital.

The port continued to grow and in 1996, a new private company, API Acapulco, was created to manage operations. This consolidated operations and now Acapulco is the major port for car exports to the Pacific.

The city was devastated by Hurricane Pauline in 1997. The storm stranded tourists and left more than 100 dead in the city. Most of the victims were from the shantytowns built on steep hillsides that surround the city. Other victims were swept away by the winds and waves. The main road, Avenida Costera, became a fast-moving river of sludge three feet (0.91 m) in depth.

=== 21st century ===
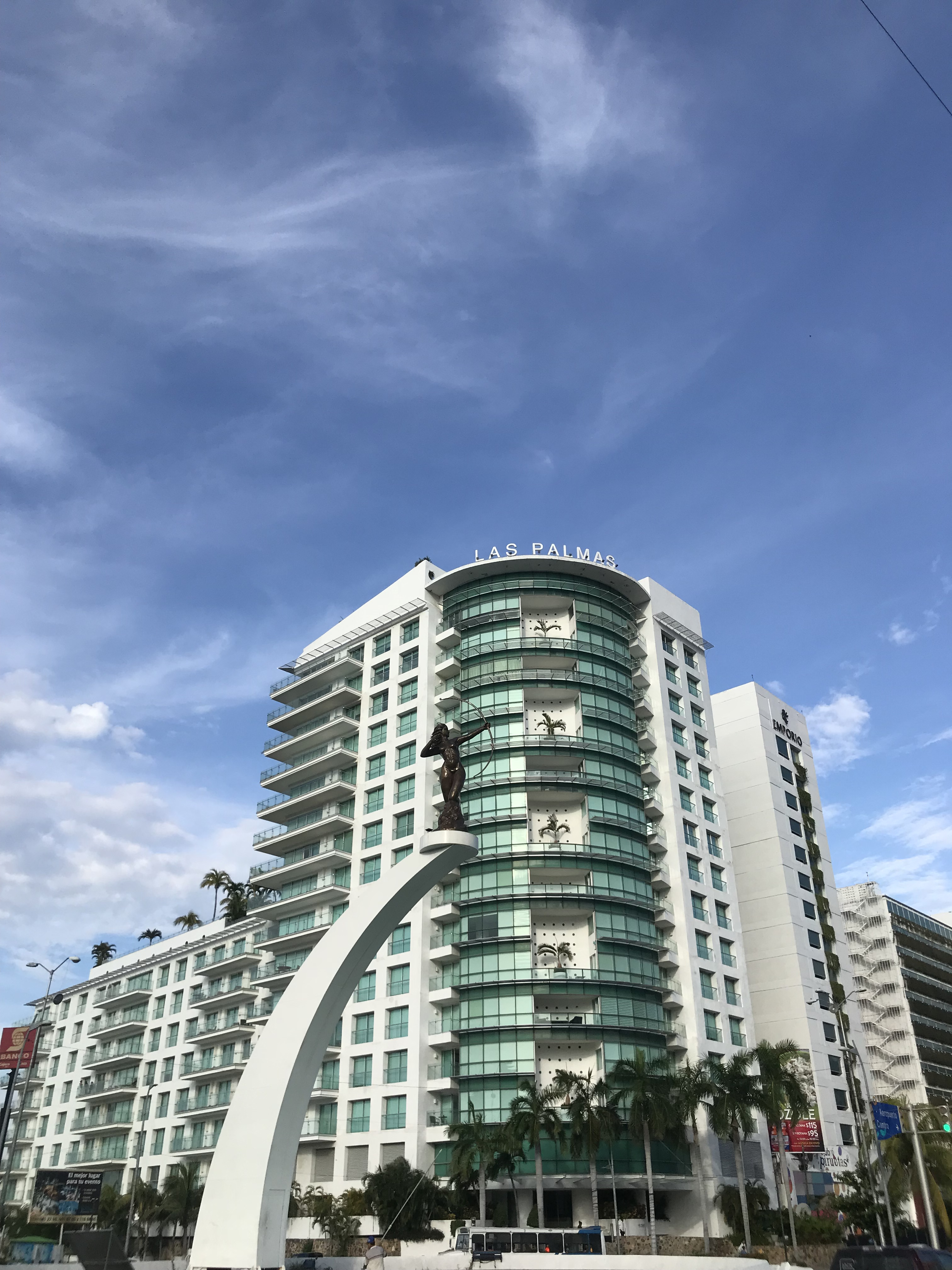
Fountain of the Huntress Diana.

Since 2006, violence associated with conflicts between criminal organizations and the government’s militarized anti-drug campaign has affected tourism in Acapulco. Criminal groups have competed for territorial control, local drug markets, extortion income and trafficking routes.

A major gun battle between 18 gunmen and soldiers took place in the summer of 2009 in the Old Acapulco seaside area, lasting hours and killing 16 of the gunmen and two soldiers. This came after the 2009 swine flu pandemic outbreak earlier in the year nearly paralyzed the Mexican economy, forcing hotels to give discounts to bring tourists back. However, hotel occupancy for 2009 was down five percent from the year before. The death of Arturo Beltrán Leyva in December 2009 resulted in infighting among different groups within the Beltrán Leyva cartel.

Gang violence continued to plague Acapulco through 2010 and into 2011, most notably with at least 15 dying in drug-related violence on March 13, 2010, and another 15 deaths on January 8, 2011. Among the first incident's dead were six members of the city police and the brother of an ex-mayor. In the second incident, the headless bodies of 15 young men were found dumped near the Plaza Sendero shopping center. On August 20, 2011, Mexican authorities reported that five headless bodies were found in Acapulco, three of which were placed in the city's main tourist area and two of which were cut into multiple pieces.

On February 4, 2013, six Spanish men were tied up and robbed and the six Spanish women with them were gang-raped by five masked gunmen who stormed a beach house on the outskirts of Acapulco, though after these accusations, none of the victims decided to press charges. On September 28, 2014, Mexican politician Braulio Zaragoza was gunned down at the El Mirador hotel in the city. He was the leader of the conservative opposition National Action Party (PAN) in southern Guerrero state. Several politicians have been targeted by drug cartels operating in the area. Investigations are under way, but no arrests have yet been made as of September 29. The insecurity due to individuals involved with drug cartels has cost the city of Acapulco its popularity among national and international tourists. It was stated by the Dirección General de Aeronáutica Civil that the number of international flyers coming to Acapulco decreased from 355,760 flyers registered in 2006 to 52,684 flyers in the year 2015, the number of international tourists flying to Acapulco dropped 85% in the interval of nine years. In 2018, the Mexican Armed Forces entered the city, placing it under occupation. The police department was disarmed after allegations of the latter being linked to the cartels.

==== Hurricane Otis ====
On October 25, 2023, Hurricane Otis, a Category 5 hurricane with 1-minute sustained winds of 160 mph (260 km/h), caused widespread devastation throughout the city while making landfall nearby.

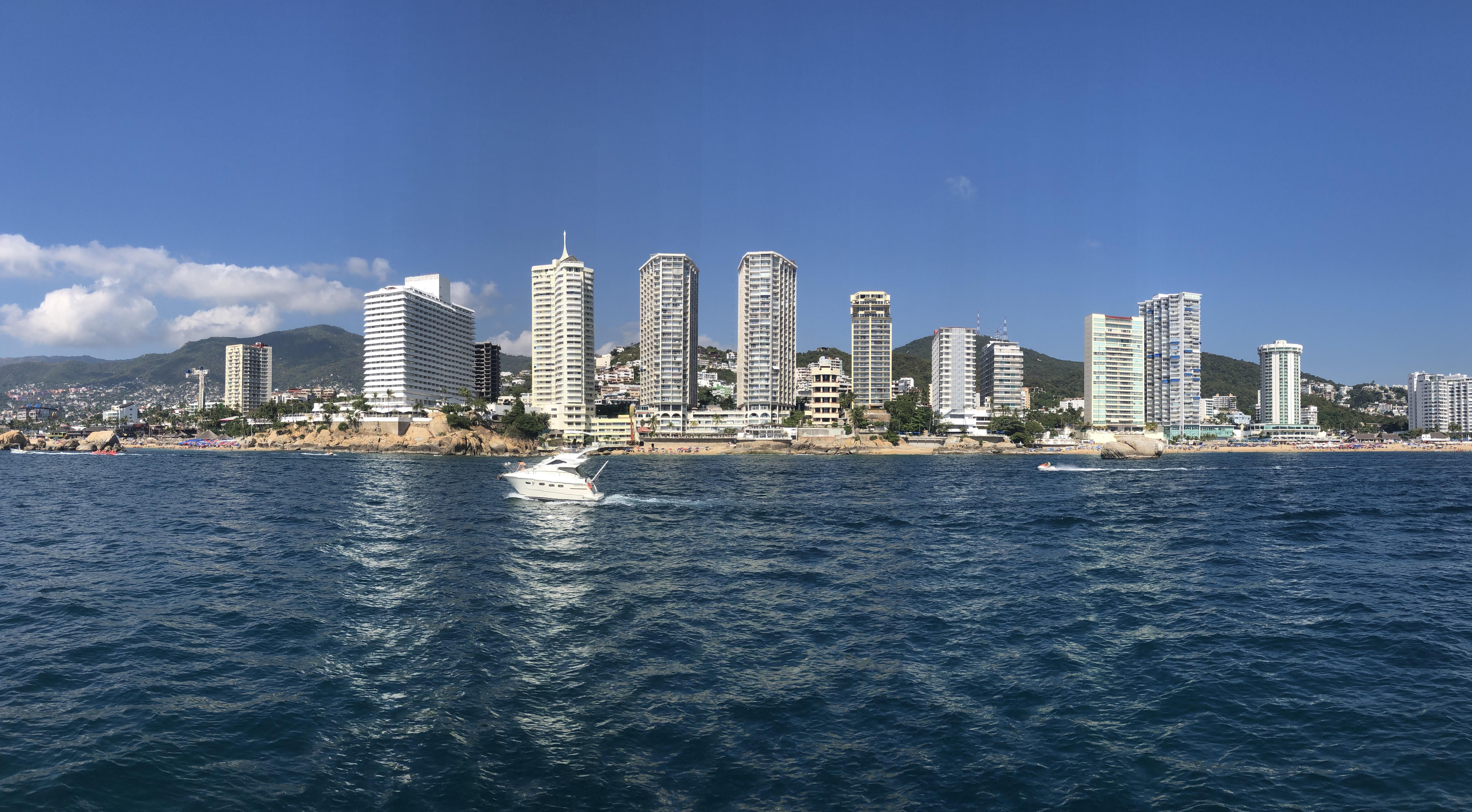
Panoramic view of the bay.

==== Hurricane John ====
Hurricane John struck Acapulco and Mexico's Pacific coast in late September 2024 as a Category 3 hurricane, delivering powerful winds and extreme rainfall that led to widespread flooding and significant damage. Acapulco experienced nearly one meter of rainfall, resulting in submerged neighborhoods and serious disruptions. Roads became impassable due to landslides, and extensive power outages left tens of thousands without electricity across Guerrero and Oaxaca. Around 40,000 homes were damaged impacting over 150,000 residents.

== Geography ==
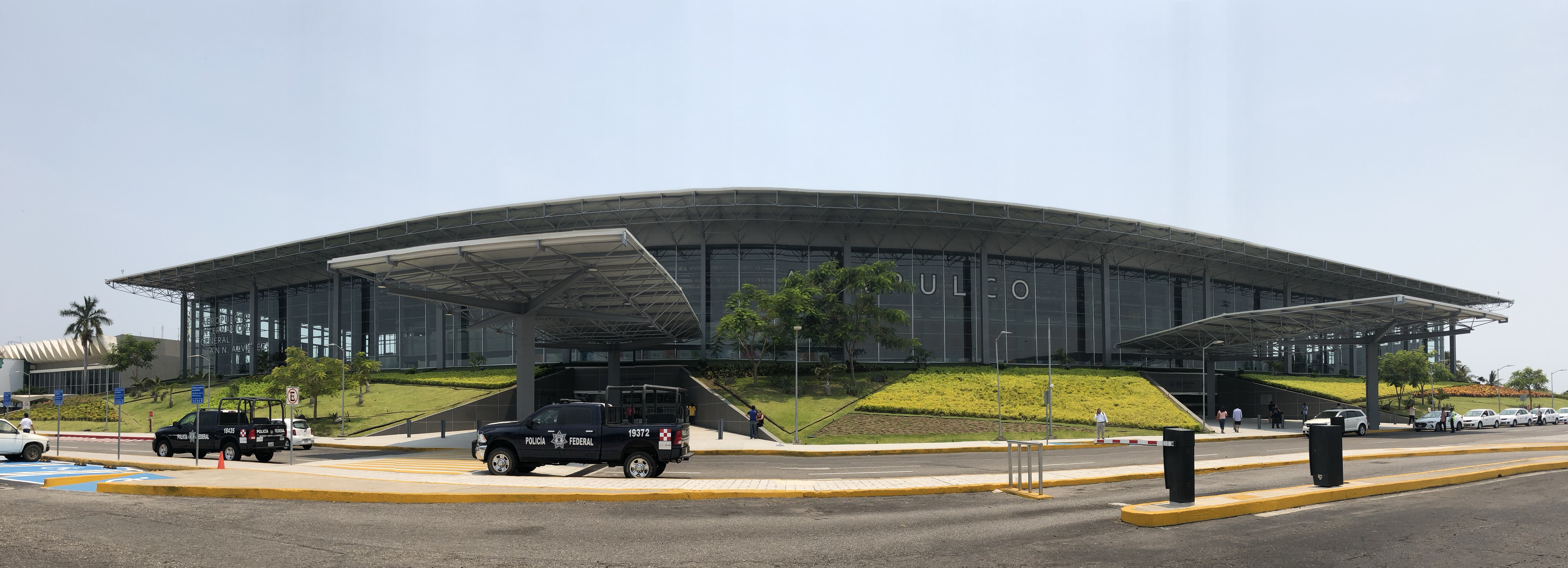
Acapulco International Airport.

The city, located on the Pacific coast of Mexico in the state of Guerrero, is classified as one of the state's seven regions, dividing the rest of the Guerrero coast into the Costa Grande and the Costa Chica. Forty percent of the municipality is mountainous terrain; another forty percent is semi-flat; and the other twenty percent is flat. Elevation varies from sea level to 1,699 metres (5,574 feet). The highest peaks are Potrero, San Nicolas, and Alto Camarón. One major river runs through the municipality, the Papagayo, along with a number of arroyos (streams). There are also two small lagoons, Tres Palos and Coyuca, along with a number of thermal springs.

=== Climate ===
Acapulco features a tropical wet and dry climate (Köppen: Aw): hot with distinct wet and dry seasons, with more even temperatures between seasons than resorts farther north in Mexico, but this varies depending on altitude. The warmest areas are next to the sea where the city is. Pacific hurricanes and tropical storms are threats from May through November; notably, the city was struck directly by Category 5 Hurricane Otis on October 25, 2023, which caused extensive damage. The forested area tends to lose leaves during the winter dry season, with evergreen pines in the highest elevations. Fauna consists mostly of deer, small mammals, a wide variety of both land and seabirds, and marine animals such as turtles. Oddly enough, January, its coolest month, also features its all-time record high.

Climate data for Acapulco (1991–2020)
Month	Jan	Feb	Mar	Apr	May	Jun	Jul	Aug	Sep	Oct	Nov	Dec	Year
Record high °C (°F)	39.5 (103.1)	35.5 (95.9)	35.5 (95.9)	37.0 (98.6)	38.0 (100.4)	36.0 (96.8)	37.5 (99.5)	37.5 (99.5)	36.0 (96.8)	36.0 (96.8)	35.5 (95.9)	36.5 (97.7)	39.5 (103.1)
Mean daily maximum °C (°F)	30.3 (86.5)	30.4 (86.7)	30.5 (86.9)	30.8 (87.4)	31.8 (89.2)	32.1 (89.8)	32.5 (90.5)	32.5 (90.5)	31.9 (89.4)	31.8 (89.2)	31.6 (88.9)	30.8 (87.4)	31.4 (88.5)
Daily mean °C (°F)	26.8 (80.2)	26.8 (80.2)	26.9 (80.4)	27.2 (81.0)	28.4 (83.1)	28.6 (83.5)	28.8 (83.8)	28.7 (83.7)	28.2 (82.8)	28.3 (82.9)	28.1 (82.6)	27.3 (81.1)	27.8 (82.0)
Mean daily minimum °C (°F)	23.2 (73.8)	23.3 (73.9)	23.3 (73.9)	23.7 (74.7)	25.0 (77.0)	25.1 (77.2)	25.1 (77.2)	25.0 (77.0)	24.5 (76.1)	24.8 (76.6)	24.7 (76.5)	23.9 (75.0)	24.3 (75.7)
Record low °C (°F)	18.5 (65.3)	19.5 (67.1)	17.0 (62.6)	16.0 (60.8)	19.0 (66.2)	18.0 (64.4)	19.0 (66.2)	19.0 (66.2)	20.5 (68.9)	16.0 (60.8)	20.0 (68.0)	20.0 (68.0)	16.0 (60.8)
Average precipitation mm (inches)	9.3 (0.37)	5.5 (0.22)	5.4 (0.21)	1.9 (0.07)	41.0 (1.61)	265.4 (10.45)	237.7 (9.36)	302.8 (11.92)	346.7 (13.65)	187.1 (7.37)	24.2 (0.95)	8.4 (0.33)	1,435.4 (56.51)
Average precipitation days (≥ 0.1 mm)	0.7	0.4	0.3	0.1	2.7	11.3	11.7	13.8	15.9	8.7	1.7	0.6	67.8
Average relative humidity (%)	77.3	77.1	77.0	76.8	77.2	78.8	78.6	79.1	81.4	82.0	80.6	78.5	78.7
Mean monthly sunshine hours	266.9	266.6	275.8	294.3	273.4	231.2	253.4	243.1	203.7	246.6	271.1	266.4	3,092.5
Source 1: Servicio Meteorológico Nacional
Source 2: NCEI

Acapulco mean sea temperature
Jan	Feb	Mar	Apr	May	Jun	Jul	Aug	Sep	Oct	Nov	Dec
28.1 °C (82.6 °F)	28.2 °C (82.8 °F)	27.6 °C (81.7 °F)	28.6 °C (83.5 °F)	29.4 °C (84.9 °F)	29.7 °C (85.5 °F)	29.9 °C (85.8 °F)	30.0 °C (86.0 °F)	29.9 °C (85.8 °F)	29.5 °C (85.1 °F)	29.1 °C (84.4 °F)	28.7 °C (83.7 °F)

The temperature of the sea is quite stable, with lows of 82 °F (28 °C) between January – March, and a high of 86 °F (30 °C) in August. These sea surface temperatures are much warmer than those further north along the Pacific coast, and indeed warmer than most places further south, as sea surface temperatures begin to decline with proximity to the Southern Hemisphere's Humboldt Current.

== Government ==
As the seat of a municipality, the city of Acapulco is the government authority for over 700 other communities, which together have a territory of 1,880.60 km^{2}. This municipality borders the municipalities of Chilpancingo, Juan R Escudero (Tierra Colorada), San Marcos, Coyuca de Benítez with the Pacific Ocean to the south.

The metropolitan area is made up of the municipalities of Acapulco de Juárez and Coyuca de Benitez. The area has a population (as of 2005) of 786,830.

For the names and terms of some Acapulco mayors, you can check a List of municipal presidents of Acapulco.

== Demographics ==
=== Population ===
Acapulco is the most populated city in the state of Guerrero, according to the results of the II Population and Housing Census 2010 carried out by the National Institute of Statistics and Geography (INEGI) with a census date of June 12, 2010, The city had until then a total population of 673,479 inhabitants, of that amount, 324,746 were men and 348,733 women. It is considered the twenty-second most populous city in Mexico and the tenth most populous metropolitan area in Mexico. It is also the city with the highest concentration of population of the homonymous municipality, representing 85.25 percent of the 789,971 inhabitants. In the 2020 census of 658,609 people where counted in the locality and 779,566 in the municipality of Acapulco, a small drop from the last census.

The metropolitan area of Acapulco is made up of six towns in the municipality of Acapulco de Juárez and four in the municipality of Coyuca de Benítez. In agreement with the last count and official delimitation realized in 2010 altogether by the National Institute of Statistics and Geography, the National Council of Population and the Secretariat of Social Development, the metropolitan area of Acapulco grouped a total of 863,431 inhabitants in a surface of 3,538.5 km^{2}, which placed it as the tenth most populated district in Mexico.

Historical population
Year	Pop.	±%
1900	4,932	—
1910	5,900	+19.6%
1921	5,768	−2.2%
1930	6,529	+13.2%
1940	9,993	+53.1%
1950	28,512	+185.3%
1960	49,149	+72.4%
1970	174,378	+254.8%
1980	301,902	+73.1%
1990	515,374	+70.7%
2000	620,656	+20.4%
2010	673,479	+8.5%
2020	658,609	−2.2%

Notes

Source: Instituto Nacional de Estadística y Geografía
- Population census (1895 – 1990, 2000 and 2010)
- Population Counts (1995 and 2005)

== Economy ==
Tourism is the main economic activity of the municipality and most of this is centered on Acapulco Bay. About seventy-three percent of the municipality's population is involved in commerce, most of it related to tourism and the port. Mining and manufacturing employ less than twenty percent and only about five percent is dedicated to agriculture. Industrial production is limited mostly to bottling, milk products, cement products, and ice and energy production. Agricultural products include tomatoes, corn, watermelon, beans, green chili peppers, and melons.

=== Tourism ===
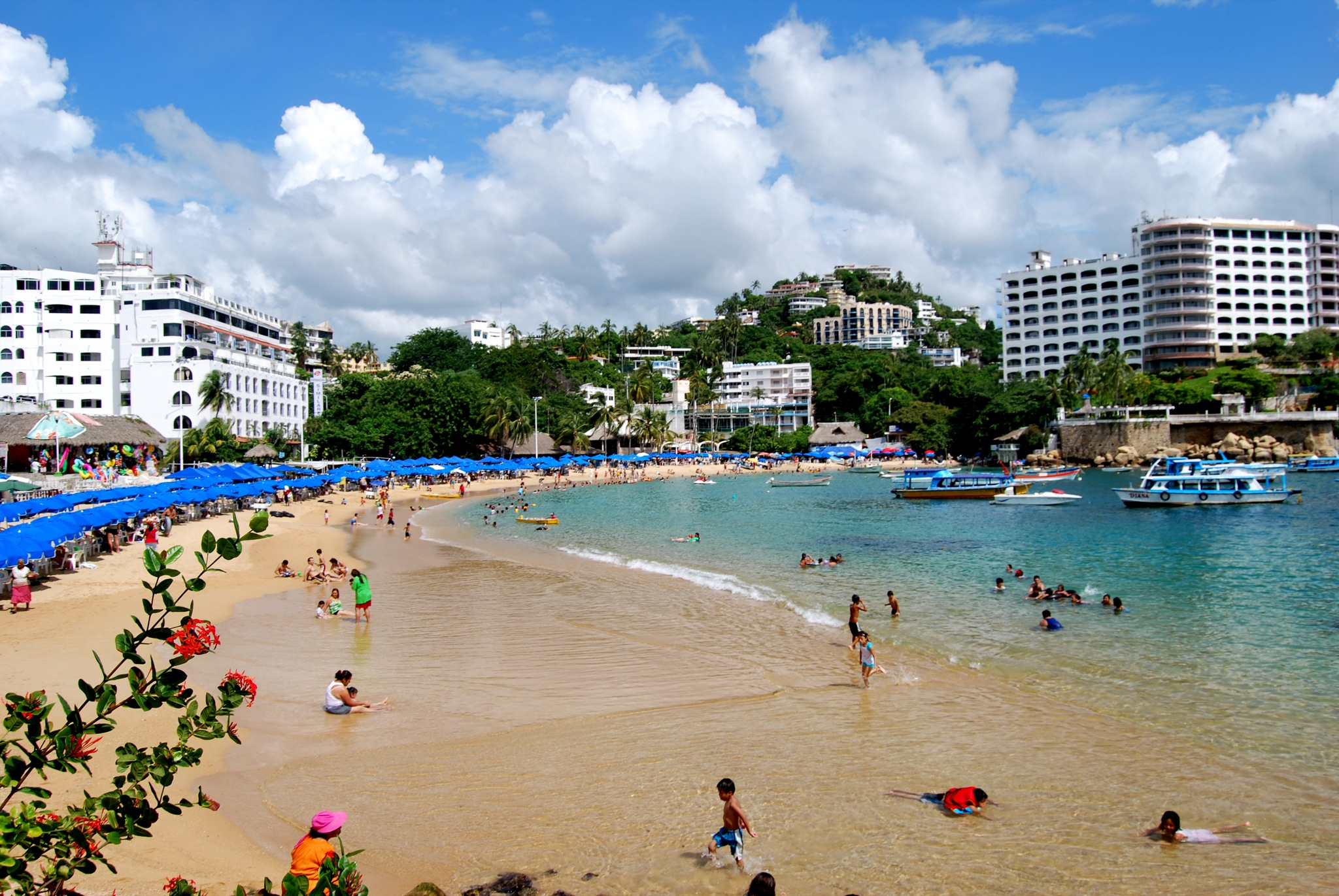
Caleta Beach.

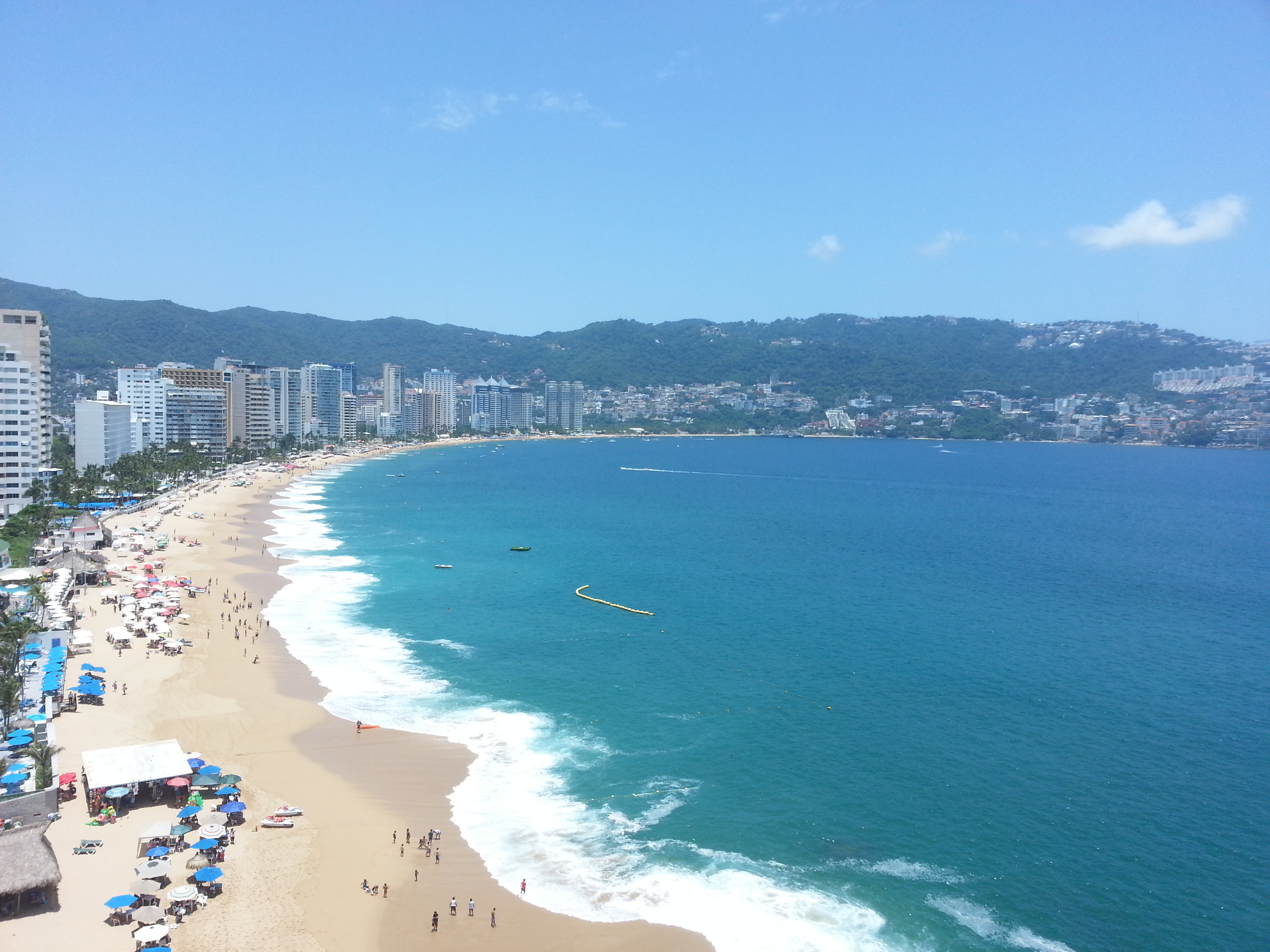
Acapulco Bay.

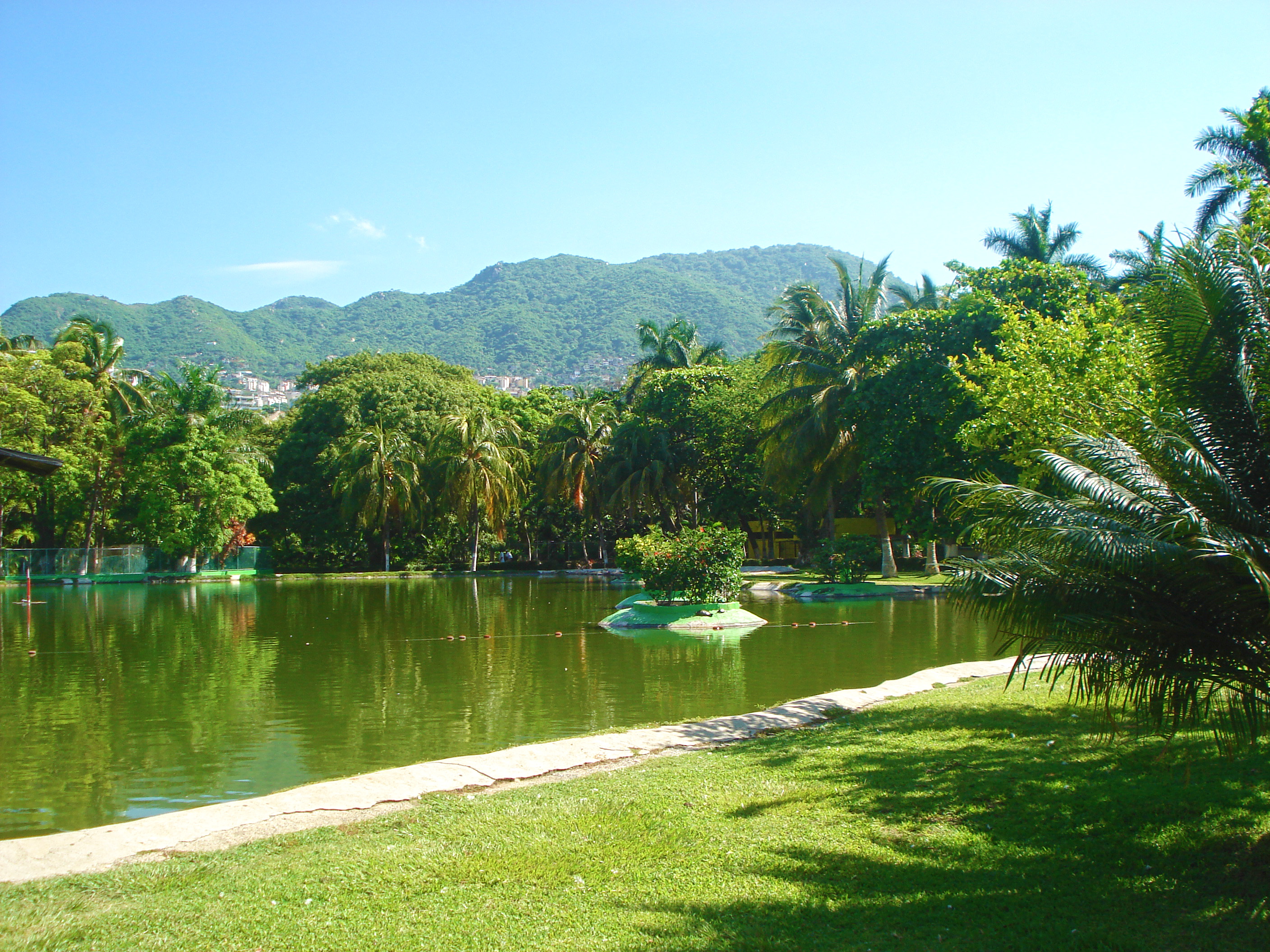
Papagayo Park.

Acapulco is one of Mexico's oldest coastal tourist destinations, reaching prominence in the 1950s as the place where Hollywood stars and millionaires vacationed on the beach in an exotic locale. In modern times, tourists in Acapulco have been facing problems with corrupt local police who steal money by extortion and intimidate visitors with threats of jail.

The city is divided into three tourist areas.

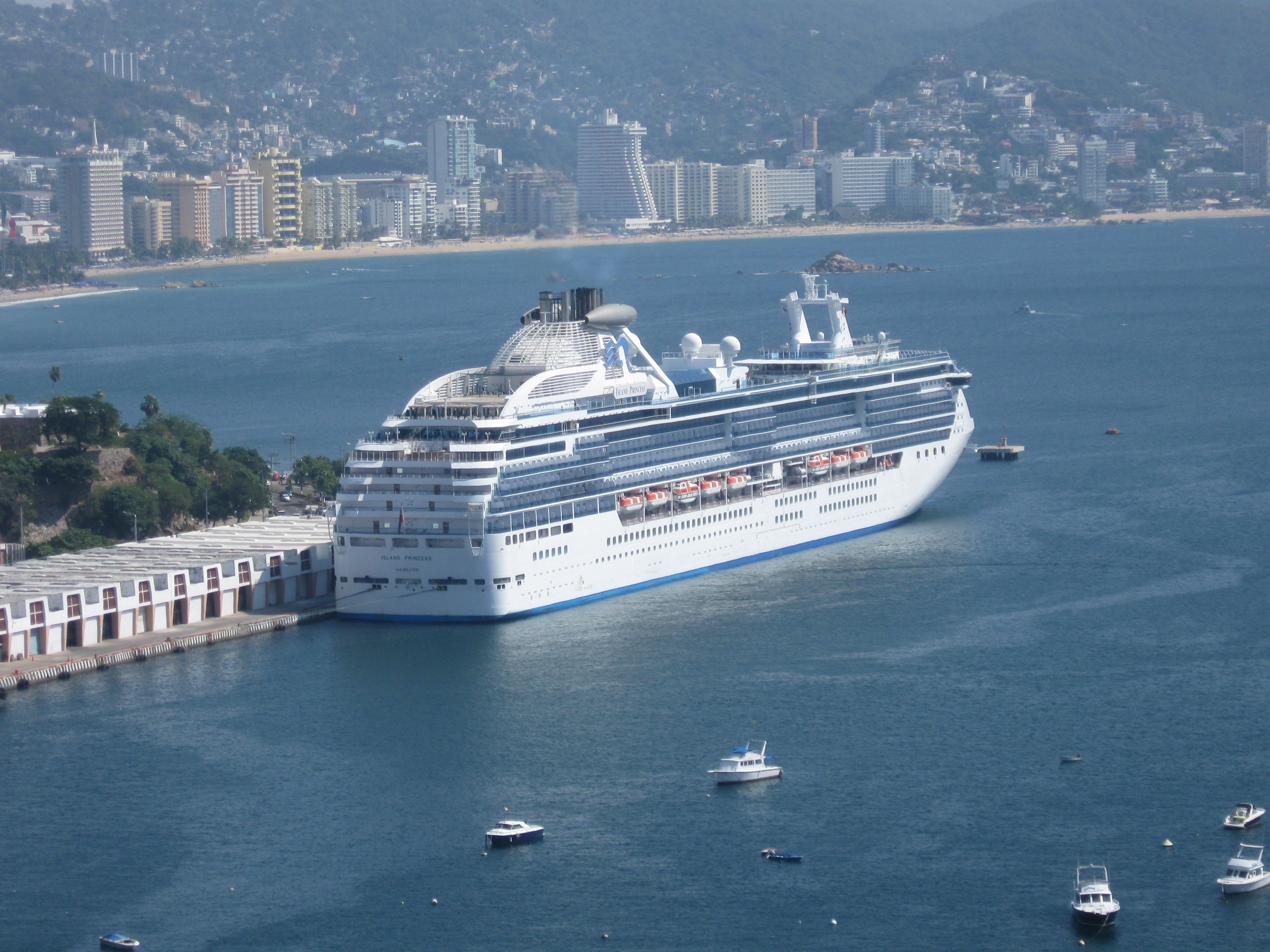
Cruise liner at the International Transatlantic Port Lieutenant José Azueta.

Traditional Acapulco is the old part of the port, where hotels like Hotel Los Flamingos, owned by personalities Johnny Weissmuller and John Wayne are located, is on the northern end of the bay. Anchored by attractions such as the beaches of Caleta and Caletilla, the cliff divers of La Quebrada, and the city square, known as El Zocalo. The heyday of this part of Acapulco ran from the late 1930s until the 1960s, with development continuing through the 1980s. This older section of town now caters to a mostly middle-class, almost exclusively Mexican clientele, while the glitzier newer section caters to the Mexican upper classes, many of whom never venture into the older, traditional part of town.

Acapulco Dorado had its development between the 1950s and the 1970s, and is about 25 minutes from the Acapulco International Airport. It is the area that presents the most tourist influx in the port, runs through much of the Acapulco bay, from Icacos, passing through Costera Miguel Aleman Avenue, which is the main one, to Papagayo Park. It has several hotels,

Acapulco Diamante, also known as Punta Diamante, is the newest and most developed part of the port, with investment having created one of the greatest concentrations of luxury facilities in Mexico, including exclusive hotels and resorts of international chains, residential complexes, luxury condominiums and private villas, spas, restaurants, shopping areas and a golf course. Starting at the Scenic Highway in Las Brisas, it includes Puerto Marqués and Punta Diamante and extends to Barra Vieja Beach. It is 10 minutes from the Acapulco International Airport. In this area, all along Boulevard de las Naciones, almost all transportation is by car, limousine or golf cart.

Acapulco's reputation of a high-energy party town and the nightlife have long been draws of the city for tourists. From November to April, luxury liners stop here daily and include ships such as the MS Queen Victoria, the MS Rotterdam, Crystal Harmony, and all the Princess line ships. Despite Acapulco's international fame, most of its visitors are from central Mexico, especially the affluent from Mexico City. Acapulco is one of the embarkation ports for the Mexican cruise line Ocean Star Cruises.

For the Christmas season of 2009, Acapulco received 470,000 visitors, most of whom are Mexican nationals, adding 785 million pesos to the economy. Eighty percent arrive by land and eighteen percent by air. The area has over 25,000 condominiums, most of which function as second homes for their Mexican owners. Acapulco is still popular with Mexican celebrities and the wealthy, such as Luis Miguel and Plácido Domingo, who maintain homes there.

==== Problems ====
Over the years, a number of problems have plagued Acapulco, especially in the bay and the older sections of the city. The large number of wandering vendors on the beaches, who offer everything from newspapers to massages, are a recognized problem. It is a bother to tourists who simply want to relax on the beach, but the government says it is difficult to eradicate, as there is a lot of unemployment and poverty in the city. Around the city are many small shantytowns that cling to the mountainsides, populated by migrants who have come to the city looking for work. In the last decade, drug-related violence has caused massive problems for the local tourism trade.

Another problem is the garbage that has accumulated in the bay. Although 60.65 tons have recently been extracted from the bays of Acapulco and nearby Zihuatanejo, more needs to be done. Most of trash removal during the off seasons is done on the beaches and in the waters closest to them. However, the center of the bay is not touched. The reason trash winds up in the bay is that it is common in the city to throw it in streets, rivers and the bay itself. The most common items cleaned out of the bay are beer bottles and car tires. Acapulco has seen some success in this area, having several beaches receiving the high "blue flag" certifications for cleanliness and water quality.

=== Cuisine ===
Acapulco's cuisine is very rich. The following are typical dishes from the region: Relleno is baked pork with a variety of vegetables and fruits such as potatoes, raisins, carrots and chiles. It is eaten with bread called bolillo. Pozole is a soup with a salsa base (it can be white, red or green), hominy, meat that can be either pork or chicken and it is accompanied with antojitos (snacks) like tostadas, tacos and tamales. This dish is served as part of a weekly Thursday event in the city and the state, with many restaurants offering the meal with special entertainment, from bands to dancers to celebrity impersonators.

=== Attractions ===
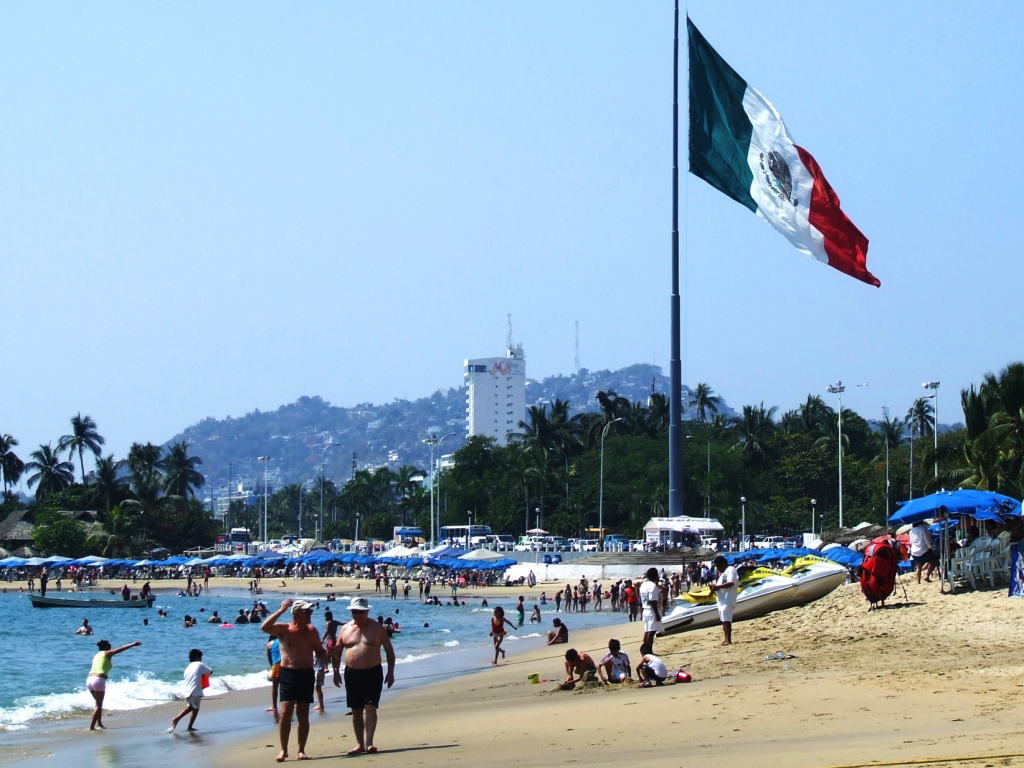
Acapulco beach with a Bandera monumental in the background.

Acapulco's main attraction is its nightlife, as it has been for many decades. Nightclubs change names and owners frequently. For example, Baby 'O has been open to the national and international public since 1976 and different celebrities have visited their installations such as Mexican singer Luis Miguel, Bono from U2 and Sylvester Stallone. Another nightclub is Palladium, located in the Escénica Avenue, the location gives the nightclub a view of the Santa Lucia Bay at night.

Informal lobby or poolside cocktail bars often offer free live entertainment. In addition, there is the beach bar zone, where younger crowds go. These are located along the Costera road, face the ocean and feature techno or alternative rock. Most are concentrated between the Fiesta Americana and Continental Plaza hotels. These places tend to open earlier and have more informal dress. There is a bungee jump in this area as well.

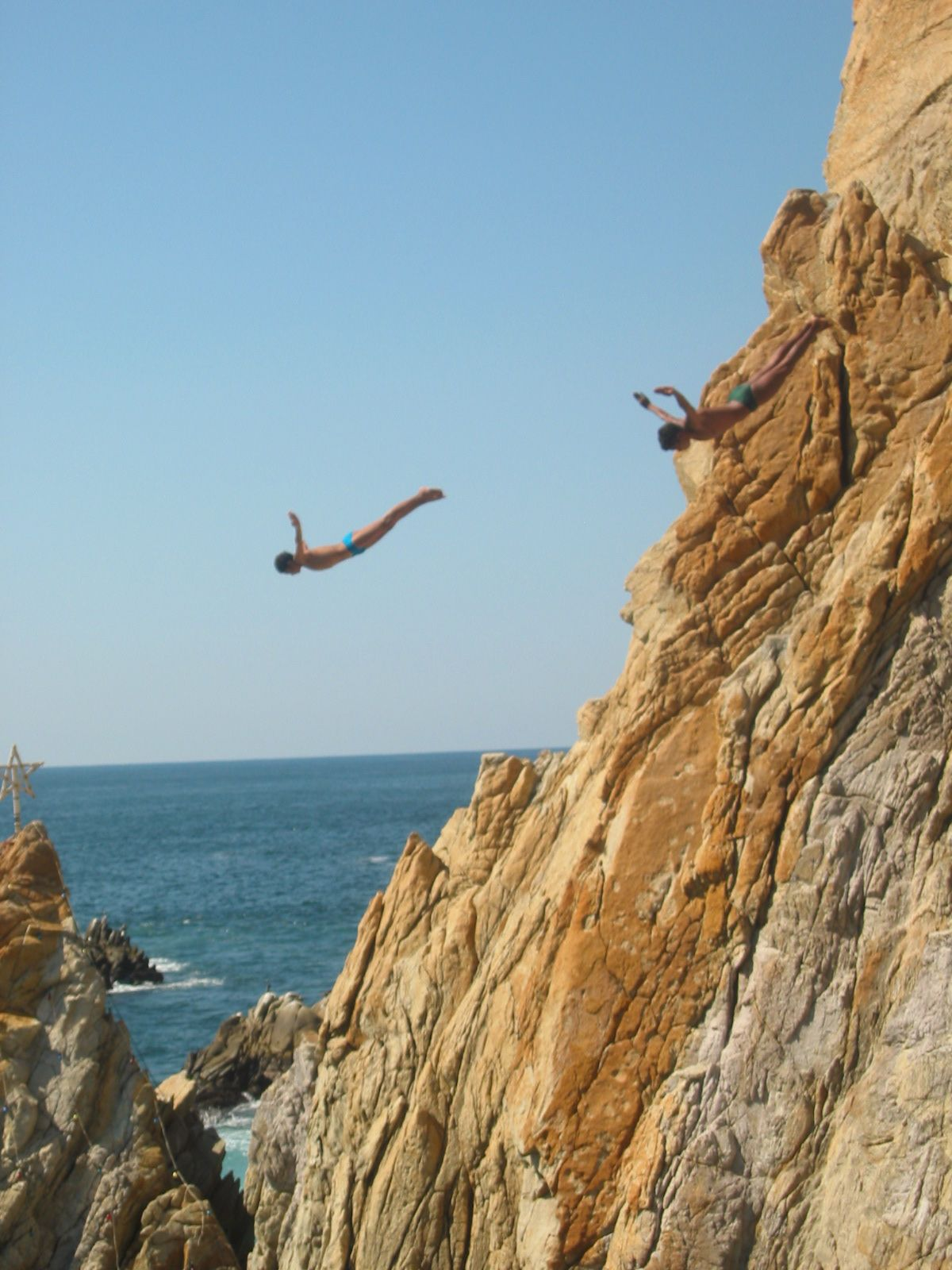
La Quebrada Cliff Divers.

Another attraction at Acapulco is the La Quebrada Cliff Divers. The tradition started in the 1930s when young men casually competed against each other to see who could dive from the highest point into the sea below. Eventually, locals began to ask for tips for those coming to see the men dive. Today the divers are professionals, diving from heights of 40 metres (130 feet) into an inlet that is only 7 metres (23 ft) wide and 4 metres (13 ft) deep, after praying first at a shrine to the Virgin of Guadalupe. On the evening before December 12, the feast day of this Virgin, freestyle cliff divers jump into the sea to honor her. Dives range from the simple to the complicated and end with the "Ocean of Fire" when the sea is lit with gasoline, making a circle of flames which the diver aims for. The spectacle can be seen from a public area which charges a small fee or from the Hotel Plaza Las Glorias/El Mirador from its bar or restaurant terrace.

There are a number of beaches in the Acapulco Bay and the immediate coastline. In the bay proper there are the La Angosta (in the Quebrada), Caleta, Caletilla, Dominguillo, Tlacopanocha, Hornos, Hornitos, Honda, Tamarindo, Condesa, Guitarrón, Icacos, Playuela, Playuelilla and Playa del Secreto. In the adjoining, smaller Bay of Puerto Marqués there is Pichilingue, Las Brisas, and Playa Roqueta. Facing open ocean just northwest of the bays is Pie de la Cuesta and southeast are Playa Revolcadero, Playa Aeromar, Playa Encantada and Barra Vieja. Two lagoons are in the area, Coyuca to the northwest of Acapulco Bay and Tres Palos to the southeast. Both lagoons have mangroves and offer boat tours. Tres Palos also has sea turtle nesting areas which are protected.

In addition to sunbathing, the beaches around the bay offer a number of services, such as boat rentals, boat tours, horseback riding, scuba diving and other aquatic sports. One popular cruise is from Caletilla Beach to Roqueta Island, which has places to snorkel, have lunch, and a lighthouse. There is also an underwater statue of the Virgin of Guadalupe here, created in 1958 by Armando Quesado in memory of a group of divers who died here. Many of the scuba-diving tours come to this area as well, where there are sunken ships, sea mountains, and cave rock formations. Another popular activity is deep-sea fishing. The major attraction is sail fishing. Fish caught here have weighed between 89 and 200 pounds. Sailfish are so plentiful that boat captains have been known to bet with a potential customer that if he does not catch anything, the trip is free.

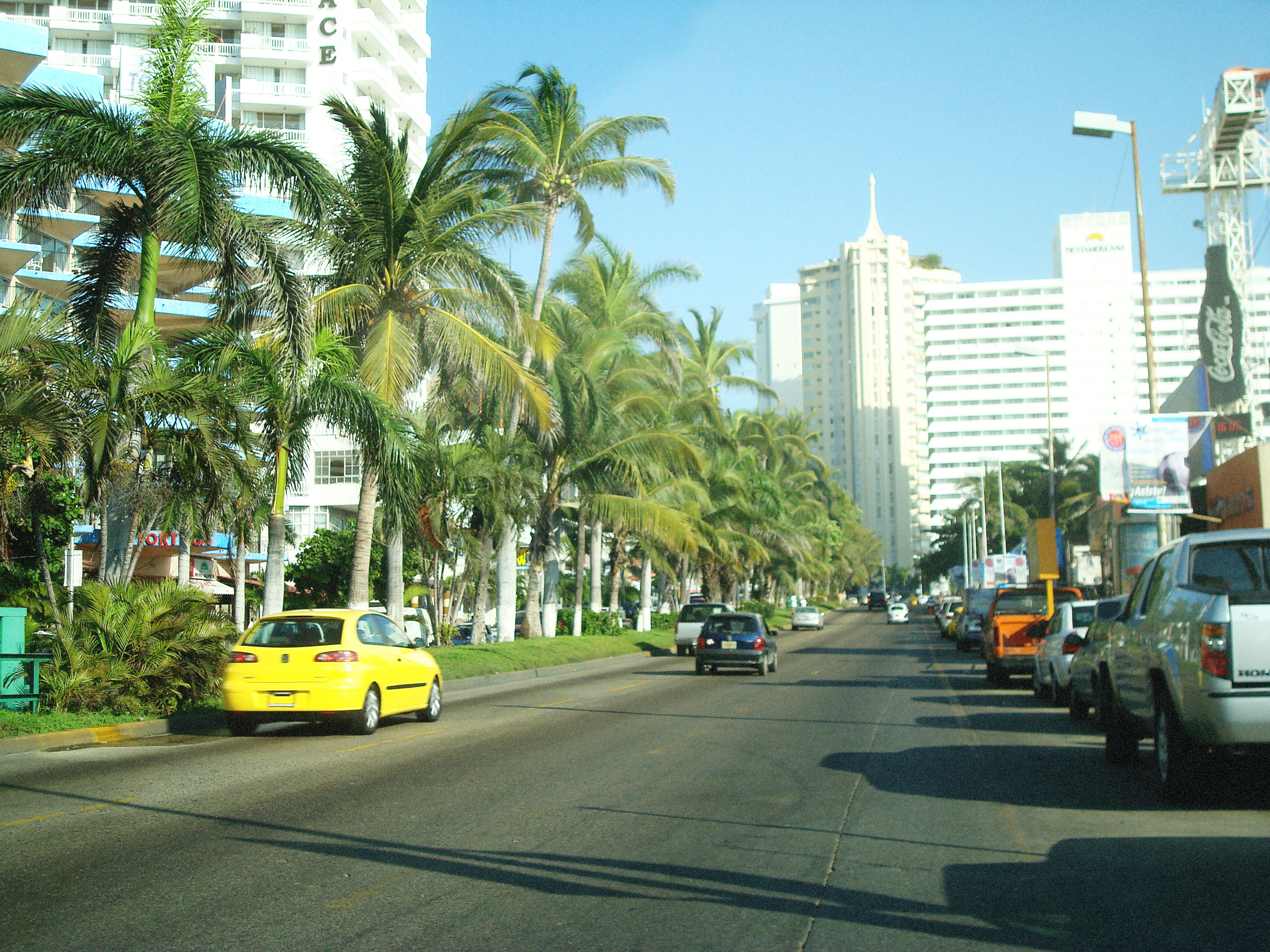
Acapulco's Miguel Alemán Coastal Avenue.

In the old part of the city, there is a traditional main square called the Zócalo, lined with shade trees, cafés and shops. At the north end of the square is Nuestra Señora de la Soledad cathedral, with blue onion-shaped domes and Byzantine towers. The building was originally constructed as a movie set, but was later adapted into a church. Acapulco's most historic building is the Fort of San Diego, located east of the main square and originally built in 1616 to protect the city from pirate attacks. The fort was built by a Dutch engineer and finished in 1617 then destroyed in 1776 by an earthquake. It was rebuilt by 1783 and this is the building that can be seen today, unchanged except for renovations done to it in 2000. Parts of the moats remain as well as the five bulwarks and the battlements. Today the fort serves as the Museo Histórico de Acapulco (Acapulco Historical Museum), which shows the port's history from the pre-Hispanic period until independence. There are temporary exhibits as well. For many years tourists could ride around the city in colorful horse-drawn carriages known as calandrias, but the practice ended in February 2020 due to concerns about mistreatment of the animals.

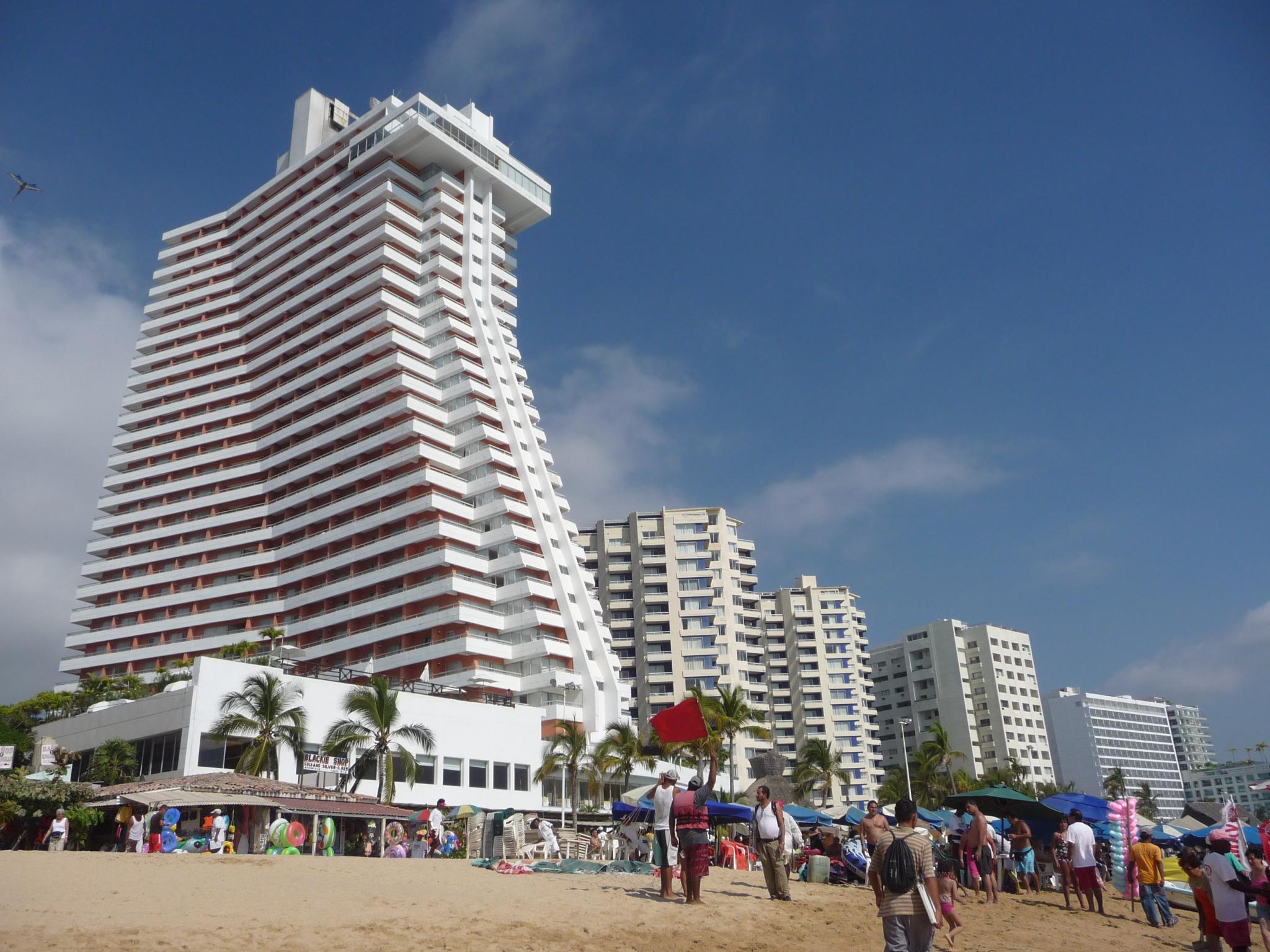
Tlacopanocha, or Tlaco de Panocha, is one of the city's main beaches.

The El Rollo Acapulco is a sea-life and aquatic park located on Costera Miguel Aleman. It offers wave pools, water slides and water toboggans. There are also dolphin shows daily and a swim with dolphins program. The center mostly caters to children. Another place that is popular with children is the Parque Papagayo: a large family park which has a life-sized replica of a Spanish galleon, three artificial lakes, an aviary, a skating rink, rides, go-karts and more.

The Dolores Olmedo House is located in the traditional downtown of Acapulco and is noted for the murals by Diego Rivera that adorn it. Olmedo and Rivera had been friend since Olmedo was a child and Rivera spent the last two years of his life here. During that time, he painted nearly nonstop and created the outside walls with tile mosaics, featuring Aztec deities such as Quetzalcoatl. The interior of the home is covered in murals. The home is not a museum, so only the outside murals can be seen by the public.

There is a small museum called Casa de la Máscara (House of Masks) which is dedicated to masks, most of them from Mexico, but there are examples from many parts of the world. The collection contains about one thousand examples and is divided into seven rooms called Masks of the World, Mexico across History, The Huichols and the Jaguar, Alebrijes, Dances of Guerrero, Devils and Death, Identity and Fantasy, and Afro-Indian masks. The Botanical Garden of Acapulco is a tropical garden located on lands owned by the Universidad Loyola del Pacífico. Most of the plants here are native to the region, and many, such as the Peltogyne mexicana or purple stick tree, are in danger of extinction.

One cultural event that is held yearly in Acapulco is the Festival Internacional de la Nao, which takes place in the Fort of San Diego, located near the Zócalo in downtown of the city. The Festival honors the remembrance of the city's interaction and trades with Oriental territories which started back in the Sixteenth Century. The Nao Festival consists of cultural activities with the support of organizations and embassies from India, China, Japan, Philippines, Thailand, Indonesia and South Korea. The variety of events go from film projections, musical interpretations and theatre to gastronomical classes, some of the events are specifically for kids.

The annual French Festival takes place throughout Acapulco city and offers a multitude of events that cement cultural links between Mexico and France. The main features are a fashion show and a gourmet food fair. The Cinépolis Galerías Diana and the Teatro Juan Ruíz de Alarcón present French and French literary figures who give talks on their specialised subjects. Even some of the local nightclubs feature French DJs. Other festivals celebrated here include Carnival, the feast of San Isidro Labrador on 15 May, and in November, a crafts and livestock fair called the Nao de China.

There are a number of golf courses in Acapulco including the Acapulco Princess and the Pierre Marqués course, the latter designed by Robert Trent Jones in 1972 for the World Cup Golf Tournament. The Mayan Palace course was designed by Pedro Guericia and an economical course called the Club de Golf Acapulco is near the convention center. The most exclusive course is that of the Tres Vidas Golf Club, designed by Robert von Hagge. It is located next to the ocean and is home to flocks of ducks and other birds.

Another sport tournament that has been held in Acapulco since 1993 is the Mexican Open tennis tournament, an ATP 500 event that currently takes place at the Arena GNP Seguros. Initially it was played in clay courts but it changed to hard court. The event has gained popularity within the passing of the years, attracting some of the top tennis players in the world including Novak Djokovic, Rafael Nadal and Marin Cilic. The total prize money is US$250,000.00 for WTA (women) and US$1,200,000.00 for ATP (men).

Acapulco also has a bullring, called the Plaza de Toros, near Caletilla Beach. The season runs during the winter and is called the Fiesta Brava.

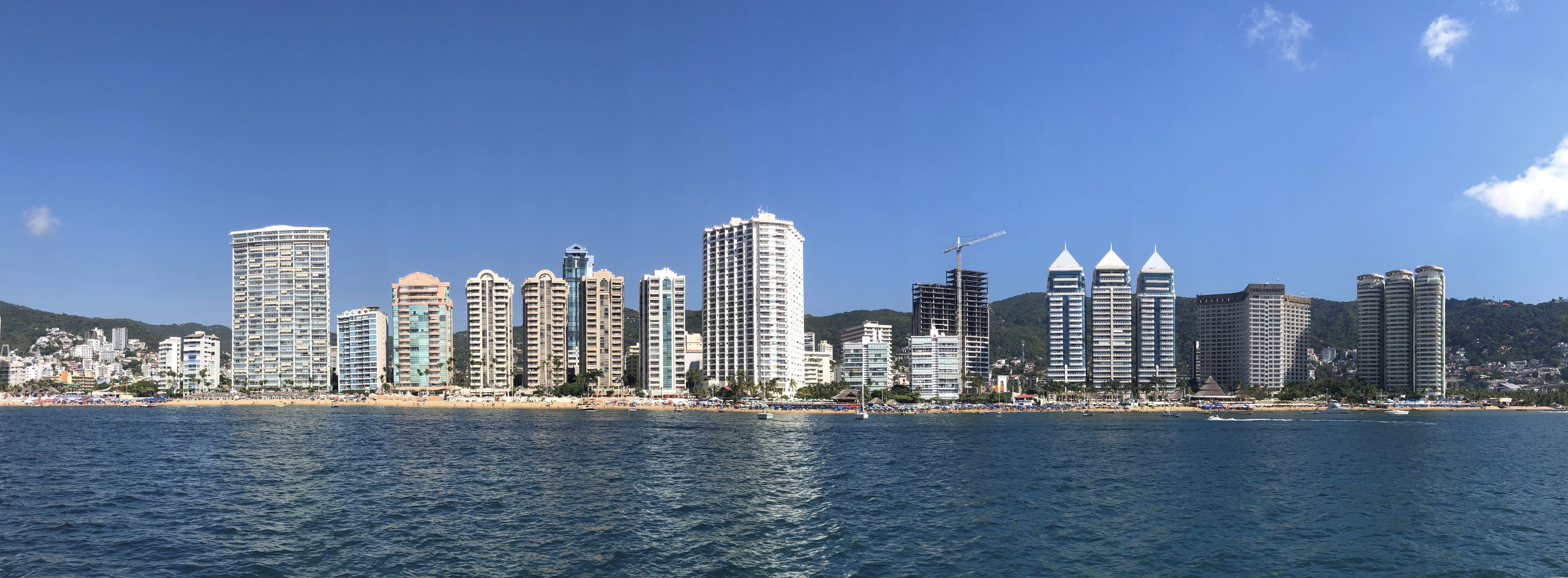
Hotels in the bay.

=== Spring break ===
Before 2010, over 100,000 American teenagers and young adults traveled to resort areas and balnearios throughout Mexico during spring break each year. The main reason students head to Mexico is the drinking age of 18 years (versus 21 for the United States), something that has been marketed by tour operators along with the sun and ocean. This has become attractive since the 1990s, especially since more traditional spring break places such as Daytona Beach, Florida, have enacted restrictions on drinking and other behaviors. This legislation has pushed spring break tourism to various parts of Mexico, with Acapulco as one of the top destinations.

In the late 1990s and early 2000s, Cancún had been favored as the spring break destination of choice. However, Cancún has taken some steps to control the reckless behavior associated with the event, and students have been looking for someplace new. This led many more to choose Acapulco, in spite of the fact that for many travelers, the flight is longer and more expensive than to Cancún. Many were attracted by the glitzy hotels on the south side and Acapulco's famous nightlife. In 2008, 22,500 students came to Acapulco for spring break. Hotels did not get that many in 2009, due mostly to the economic situation in the United States, and partially because of scares of drug-related violence.

In February 2009, the US State Department issued a travel alert directed at college students planning spring break trips to Acapulco. The warning—a result of violent activity springing from Mexico's drug cartel débâcle—took college campuses by storm, with some schools going so far as to warn their students about the risks of travel to Mexico over spring break. Bill O'Reilly devoted a segment of his show, The O'Reilly Factor, to urge students to stay away from Acapulco. In June 2009, a number of incidents occurred between the drug cartel and the government. These included coordinated attacks on police headquarters and open battles in the streets, involving large-caliber weapons and grenades. However, no incidents of violence against travelers on spring break were reported.

== Transportation ==
=== Air ===
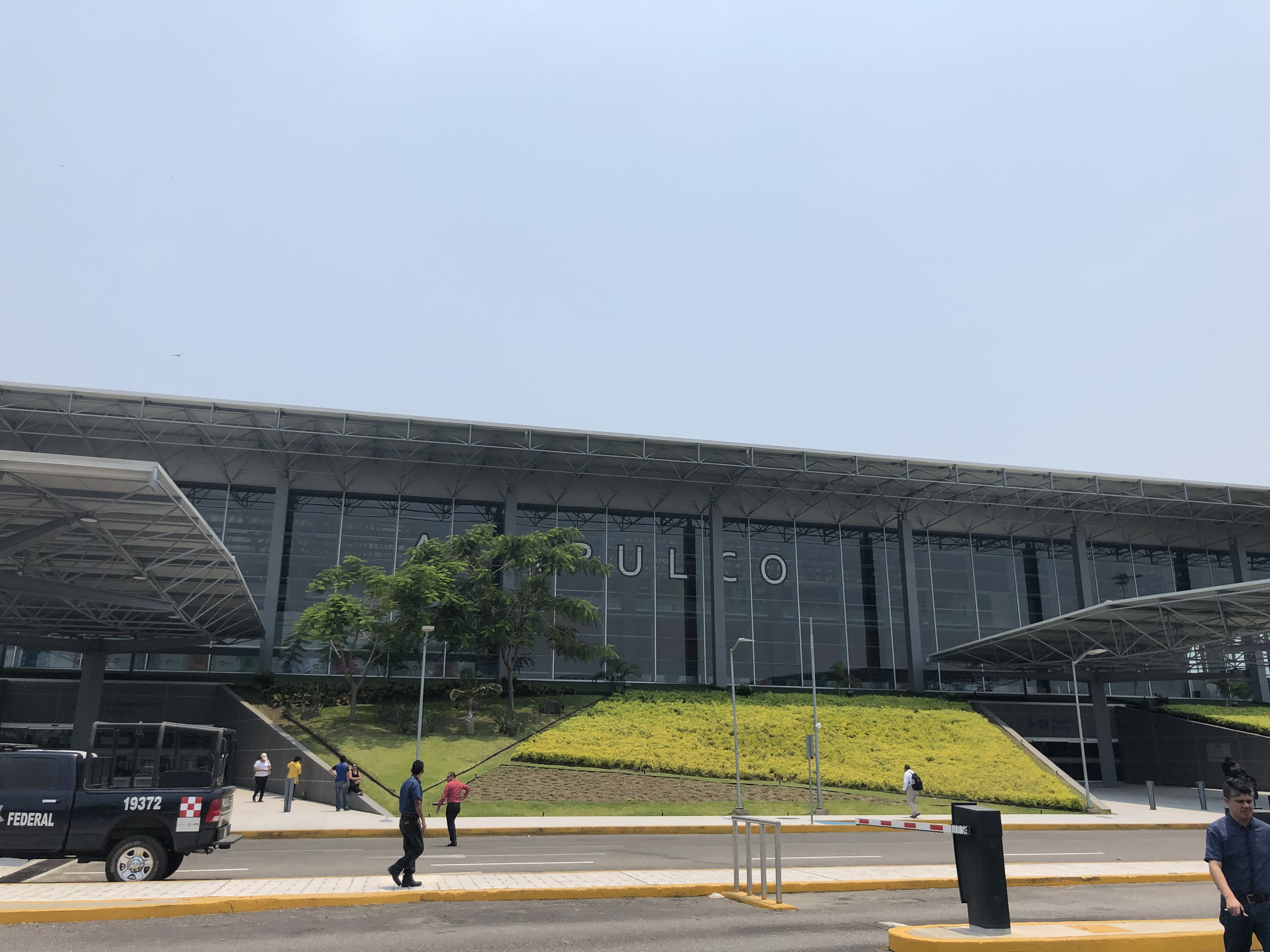
Acapulco International Airport

Acapulco International Airport (ACA), also known as General Juan N. Álvarez International Airport, is the primary airport serving the city. The airport once had several long-haul flights to destinations such as Europe, but is now primarily serve by domestic flights and seasonal flights to the United States and Canada. Despite its location, the airport is owned and operated by the Grupo Aeroportuario Centro Norte (OMA) rather than the Grupo Aeroportuario del Pacífico.

=== Public transport ===
Acabus serves as the city's bus rapid transit system

Acabús serves as the city's bus rapid transit (BRT) and opened in 2016. The system spans 36.2 kilometres (22.5 miles), with 17 routes spread throughout the city of Acapulco, with five routes serving as trunk routes. Boarding is sped by prepayment at stations.

An important mode of transportation is the government-subsidized 'Colectivo' cab system. These cabs cost 13 pesos per person to ride, but they are not private. The driver will pick up more passengers as long as seats are available, and will transport them to their destination based on first-come, first-served rules. The colectivos each travel a designated area of the city, the three main ones being Costera, Colosio, Coloso, or a mixture of the three. Coloso cabs travel mainly to old Acapulco. Colosio cabs travel through most of the tourist area of Acapulco. Costera cabs drive up and down the coast of Acapulco, where most of the hotels for visitors are located, but which includes some of old Acapulco. Drivers have discretion over destinations; some are willing to travel to the other designated areas, especially during slow periods of the day.

== International relations ==
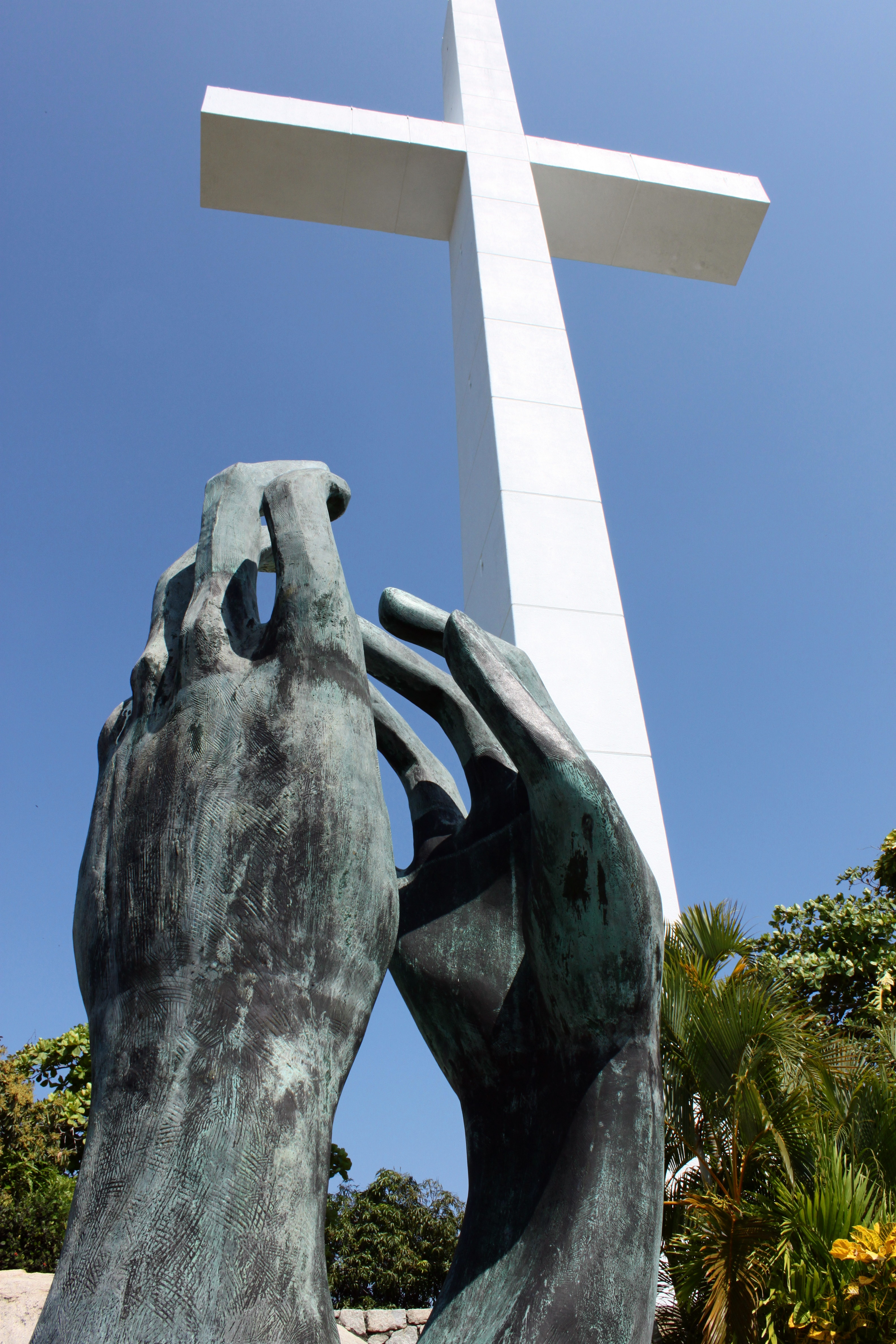
Hands of Brotherhood and cross, Peace Ecumenical Chapel.

=== Consulates ===
Country	Type	Ref.
Canada	Consular agency	
United States	Consular agency	
The Russian Federation	Honorary consul	
Finland	Honorary consul	
France	Honorary consul	
Philippines	Honorary consul	
Poland	Honorary consul	
Spain	Honorary consul	
United Kingdom	Honorary consul	

=== Twin towns and partner cities ===
==== International ====
- (Philippines) Manila, 1969
- (Israel) Netanya, 1980
- (Japan) Sendai, 1983
- (China) Qingdao, 1985
- (Canada) Quebec City, 1986
- (Italy) Naples, 1986
- (United States) Beverly Hills, 1988
- (Japan) Onjuku, 1988
- (France) Cannes, 1994
- (United States) McAllen, 1997
- (Colombia) Santa Marta, 2005
- (Ecuador) Manta, 2005
- (Spain) Ordizia, 2008
- (Ukraine) Yalta, 2012
- (Dominican Republic) Sosúa, 2012
- (The Bahamas) Nassau, 2012
- (Peru) Callao, 2014
- (Colombia) Cartagena, 2017
- (Israel) Eilat, 2017

==== Domestic ====
- (Mexico) Teocaltiche, 2005
- (Mexico) Dolores Hidalgo, 2009
- (Mexico) Guanajuato City, 2010
- (Mexico) Boca del Río, 2012
- (Mexico) Morelia, 2013

== UNESCO World Heritage Site nominations ==
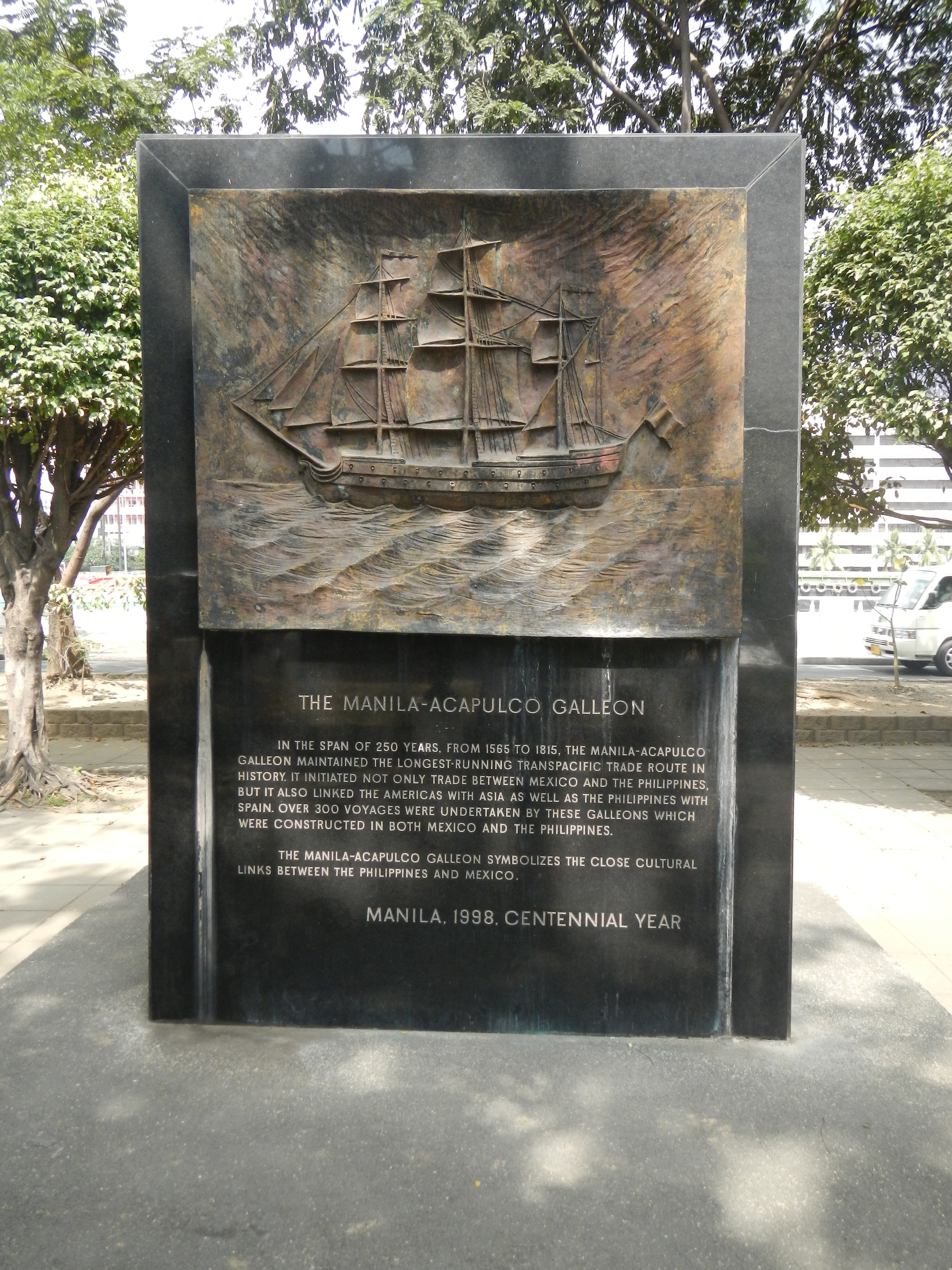
The Manila-Acapulco Galleon Memorial at Plaza Mexico in Intramuros, Manila.

In 2014, the idea to nominate the Manila-Acapulco Galleon Trade Route was initiated by the Mexican ambassador to UNESCO with the Filipino ambassador to UNESCO.

An Experts' Roundtable Meeting was held at the University of Santo Tomas (UST) on April 23, 2015, as part of the preparation of the Philippines for the possible transnational nomination of the Manila-Acapulco Galleon Trade Route to the World Heritage List. The nomination will be made jointly with Mexico.

The following are the experts and the topics they discussed during the roundtable meeting: Dr. Celestina Boncan on the Tornaviaje; Dr. Mary Jane A. Bolunia on Shipyards in the Bicol Region; Mr. Sheldon Clyde Jago-on, Bobby Orillaneda, and Ligaya Lacsina on Underwater Archaeology; Dr. Leovino Garcia on Maps and Cartography; Fr. Rene Javellana, S.J. on Fortifications in the Philippines; Felice Sta. Maria on Food; Dr. Fernando Zialcita on Textile; and Regalado Trota Jose on Historical Dimension. The papers presented and discussed during the roundtable meeting will be synthesized into a working document to establish the route's Outstanding Universal Value.

The Mexican side reiterated that they will also follow suit with the preparations for the route's nomination.

Spain has also backed the nomination of the Manila-Acapulco Trade Route in the UNESCO World Heritage Site list and has also suggested the Archives of the Manila-Acapulco Galleons to be nominated as part of a separate UNESCO list, the UNESCO Memory of the World Register.

Type (criteria)	Site	Location	Description	Image	Ref
Mixed	The Historic Manila‑Acapulco Galleon Trade Route	Philippines and Mexico		White represents the route of the Manila Galleons in the Pacific.	

== See also ==
- Acapulco (municipality)
- Acapulco Chair
- Triangle of the Sun
- Loco in Acapulco
