= La Quebrada Cliff Divers =

Professional high divers based in Acapulco, Mexico

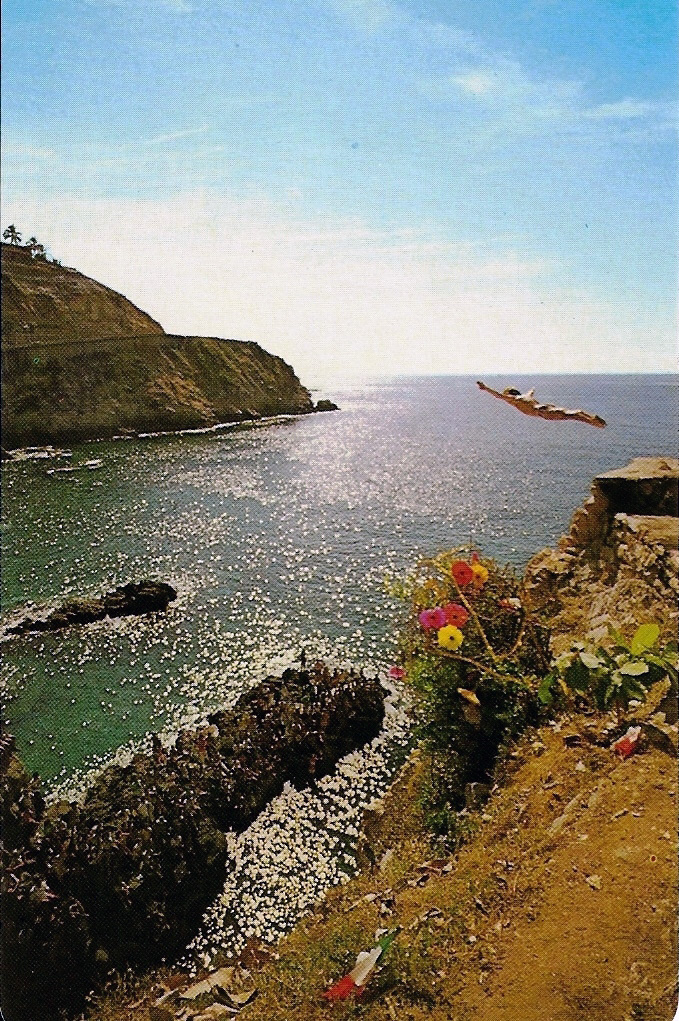
Champion Cliff Diver

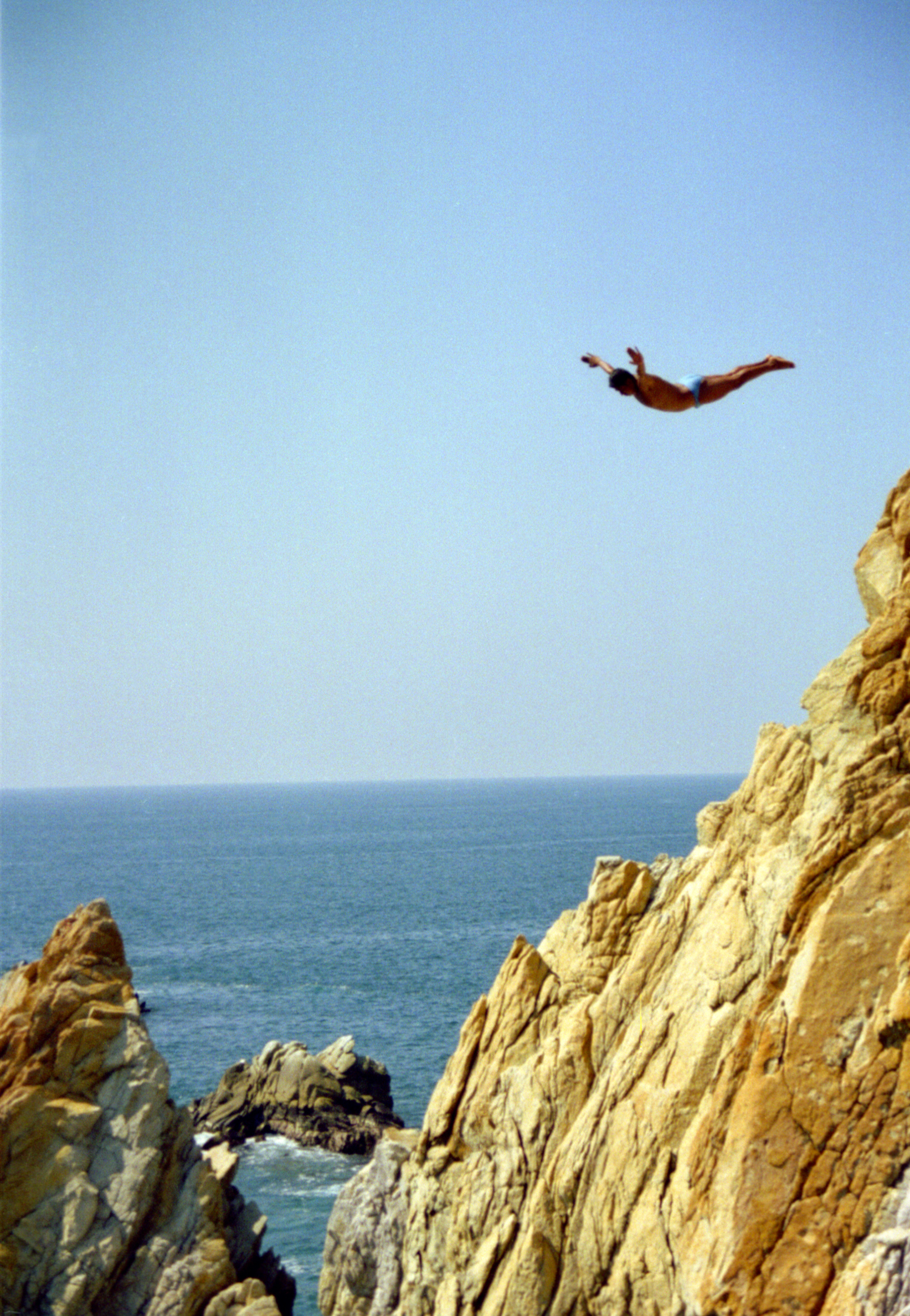
A cliff diver

The La Quebrada Cliff Divers are a group of professional high divers, based in Acapulco, Mexico. They perform daily shows for the public, which involve diving 30 or 41 meters (98 or 135 feet) from the cliffs of La Quebrada into the sea below. The depth of water in the "Gulch" can vary from 4.8 to 5.8 meters (16 to 19 feet) depending on the waves. The width of the channel varies from 12.8 to 14.6 meters (42 to 48 feet). Timing is crucial for the divers. During the night, they often hold torches while diving. Acapulco cliff diving was regularly featured on weekend sports television programming in the United States during the 1960s and 1970s when the USA High Diving Team competed with the La Quebrada Cliff Divers annually during the Acapulco Christmas Festival. The 2002 Guinness Book of World Records lists this as "the highest regularly performed headfirst dives" in the world.

Although cliff diving at La Quebrada had taken place for many years, it was not until 1934 that the La Quebrada Cliff Divers was formed. One of the more famous Cliff Divers was Raoul Garcia. Swiss big-band leader, playboy, club owner and hotelier Teddy Stauffer, the man who is credited with turning Acapulco into a world class resort and for some time managed the El Mirador Hotel at La Quebrada, actually turned the boys, who were diving from the cliffs there, into stars, some ten years later. He is remembered as "Mr. Acapulco" to this day.

The 1963 Elvis Presley film Fun in Acapulco brought the cliffs to worldwide attention.

ABC's Wide World of Sports popularized La Quebrada during the 1970s as one of the early extreme sports. Professional high divers worldwide regard La Quebrada as one of their favorites.

The Cliff Divers show as seen from the El Mirador Hotel is a popular cruise destination.

== See also ==
- 2014 FINA High Diving World Cup
- Coasteering
- List of World Aquatics Championships medalists in high diving
- Red Bull Cliff Diving World Series – annual international series of cliff diving events that was established in 2009
- Tombstoning
