= Ixtapa-Zihuatanejo International Airport =

International airport serving Ixtapa-Zihuatanejo, Mexico

Ixtapa-Zihuatanejo International Airport Aeropuerto Internacional de Ixtapa-Zihuatanejo

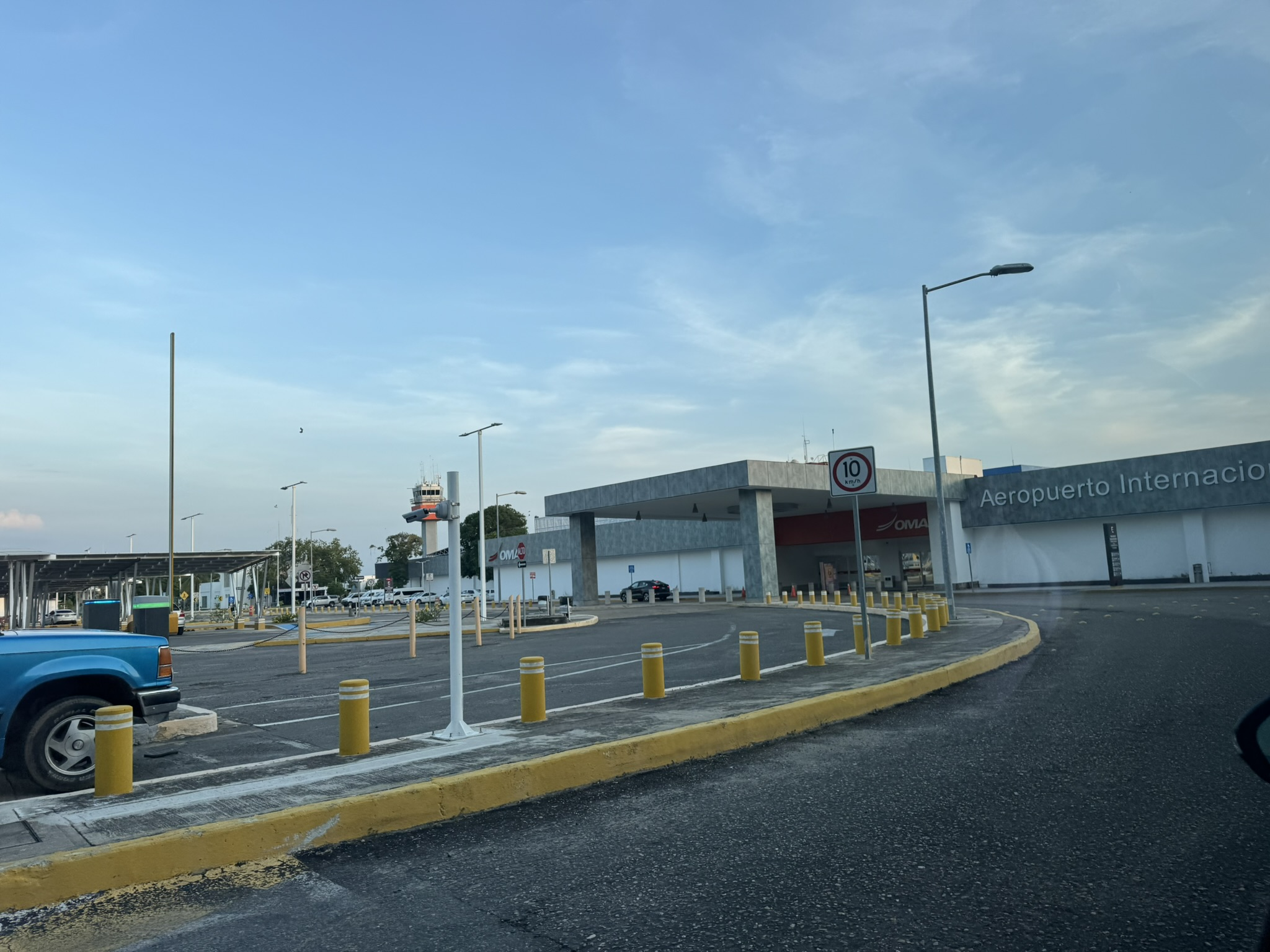
- IATA: ZIH; ICAO: MMZH

Summary
- Airport type: Public
- Operator: Grupo Aeroportuario Centro Norte
- Serves: Ixtapa and Zihuatanejo, Guerrero, Mexico
- Location: Zihuatanejo, Guerrero, Mexico
- Time zone: CST (UTC-06:00)
- Elevation AMSL: 8 m (26 ft)
- Coordinates: 17°36′05″N 101°27′37″W
- Website: www.oma.aero/en/passengers/zihuatanejo/

Map
- Location of airport in Guerrero ZIH (Mexico)

Runways
Direction	Length		Surface
Direction	m	ft	Surface
09/27	2,500	8,202	Asphalt

Statistics (2025)
- Total passengers: 733,616
- Ranking in Mexico: 32nd ▲1
- Source: Grupo Aeroportuario Centro Norte

Ixtapa-Zihuatanejo International Airport (Spanish: Aeropuerto Internacional de Ixtapa-Zihuatanejo) (IATA: ZIH, ICAO: MMZH) is an international airport located in Zihuatanejo, Guerrero, Mexico. It serves as the primary gateway for both domestic and international air travel to the resort cities of Ixtapa and Zihuatanejo, popular tourist destinations situated along the Costa Grande region of the Mexican Pacific Coast. The airport facilitates nonstop flights to numerous major cities within Mexico, along with mostly seasonal flights to destinations in the United States and Canada. Additionally, the airport supports various activities in general and executive aviation, as well as flight training.

Operated by Grupo Aeroportuario Centro Norte (OMA), Ixtapa-Zihuatanejo International Airport reported handling 674,660 passengers in 2024 and experienced an increase to 733,616 passengers in 2025.

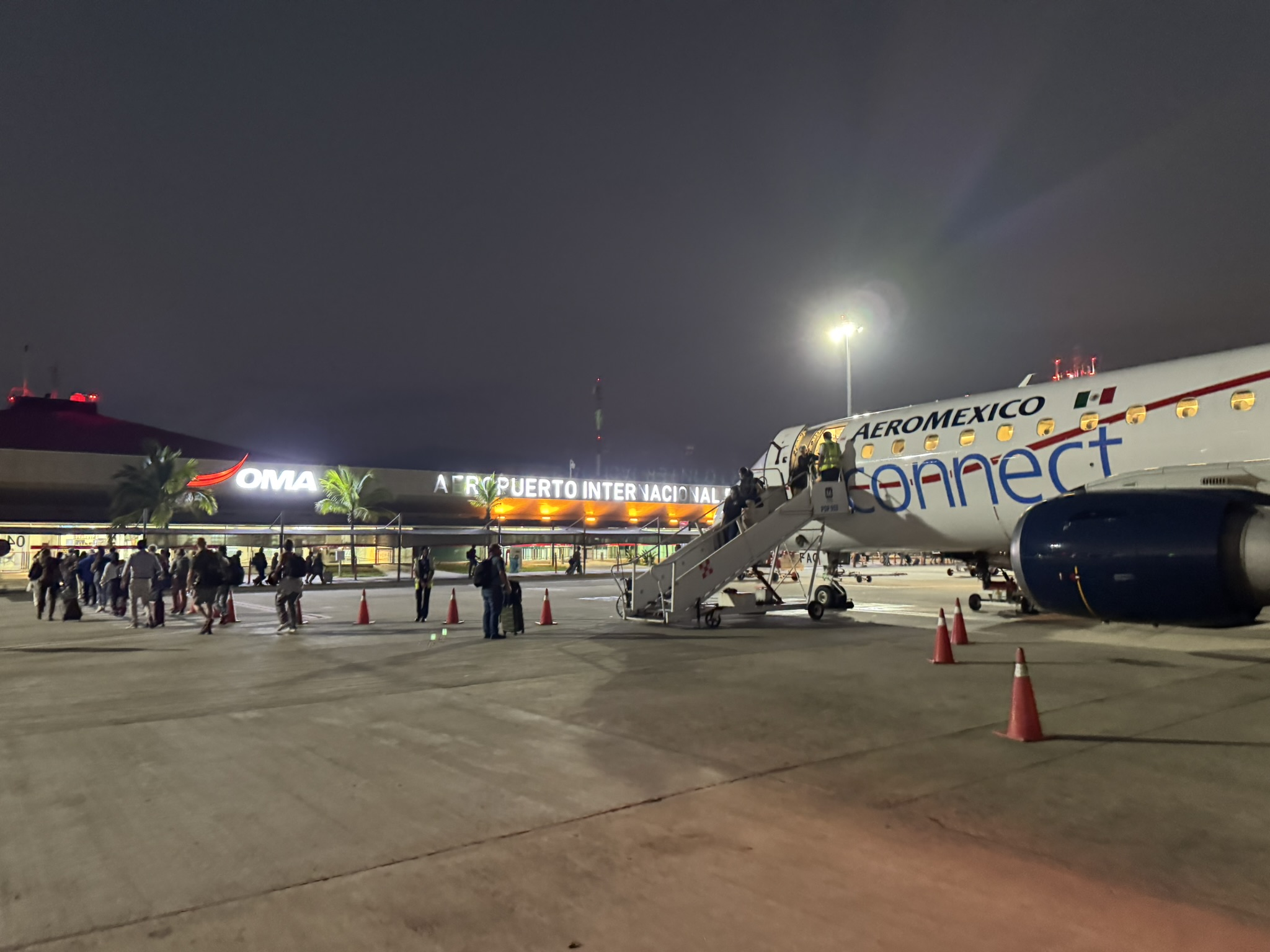
Airport's airside

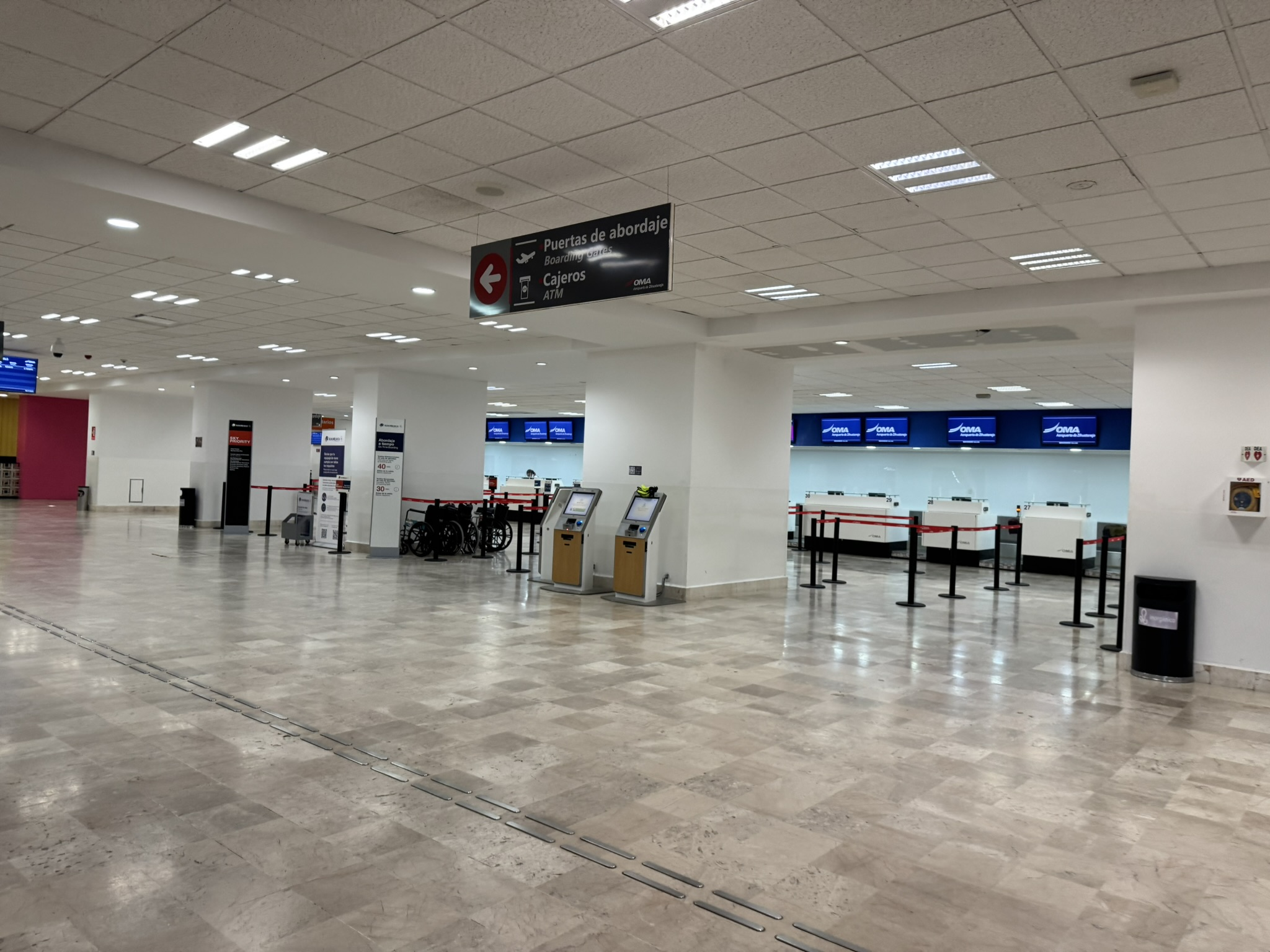
Check-in counters

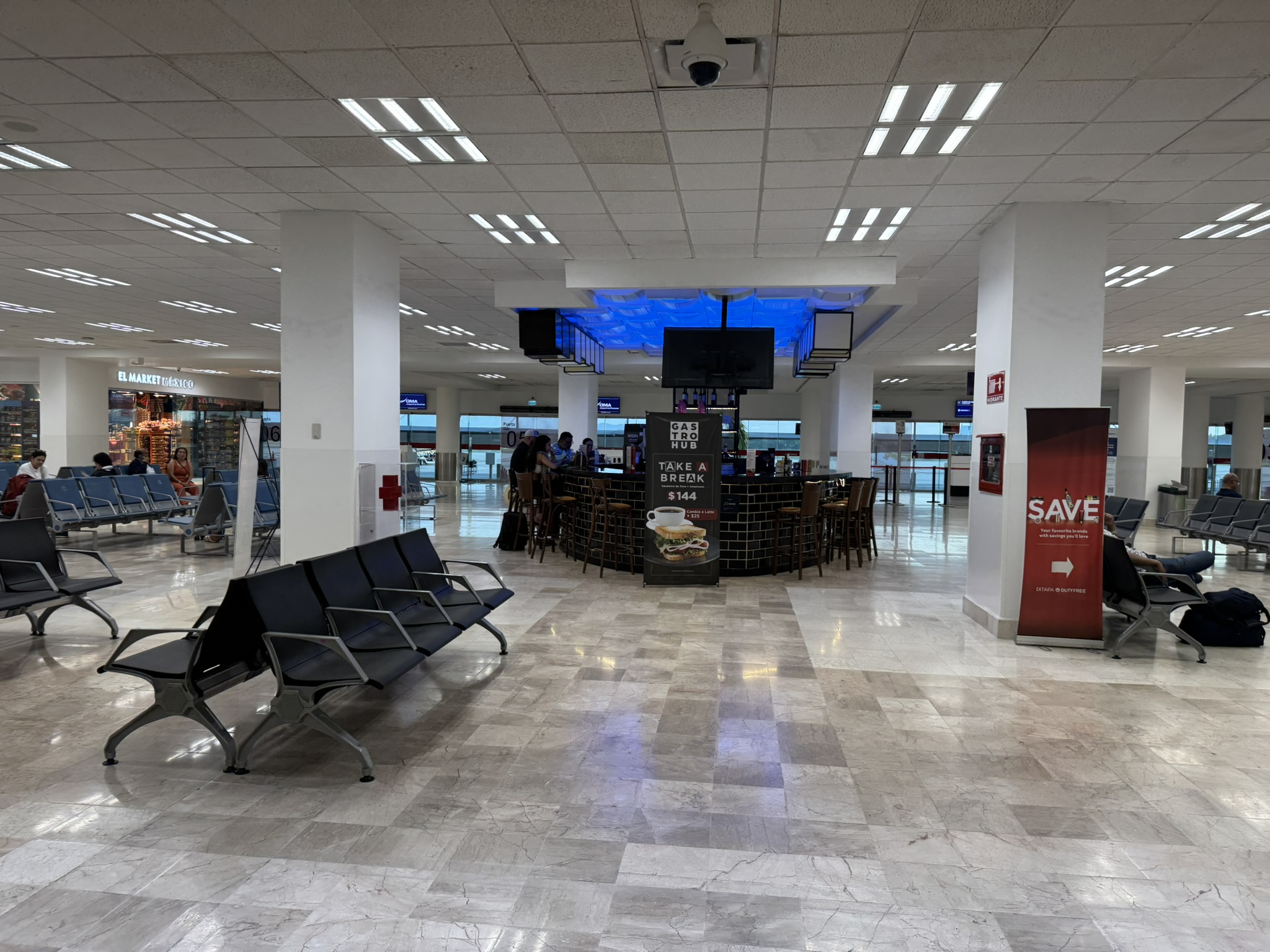
Last waiting room

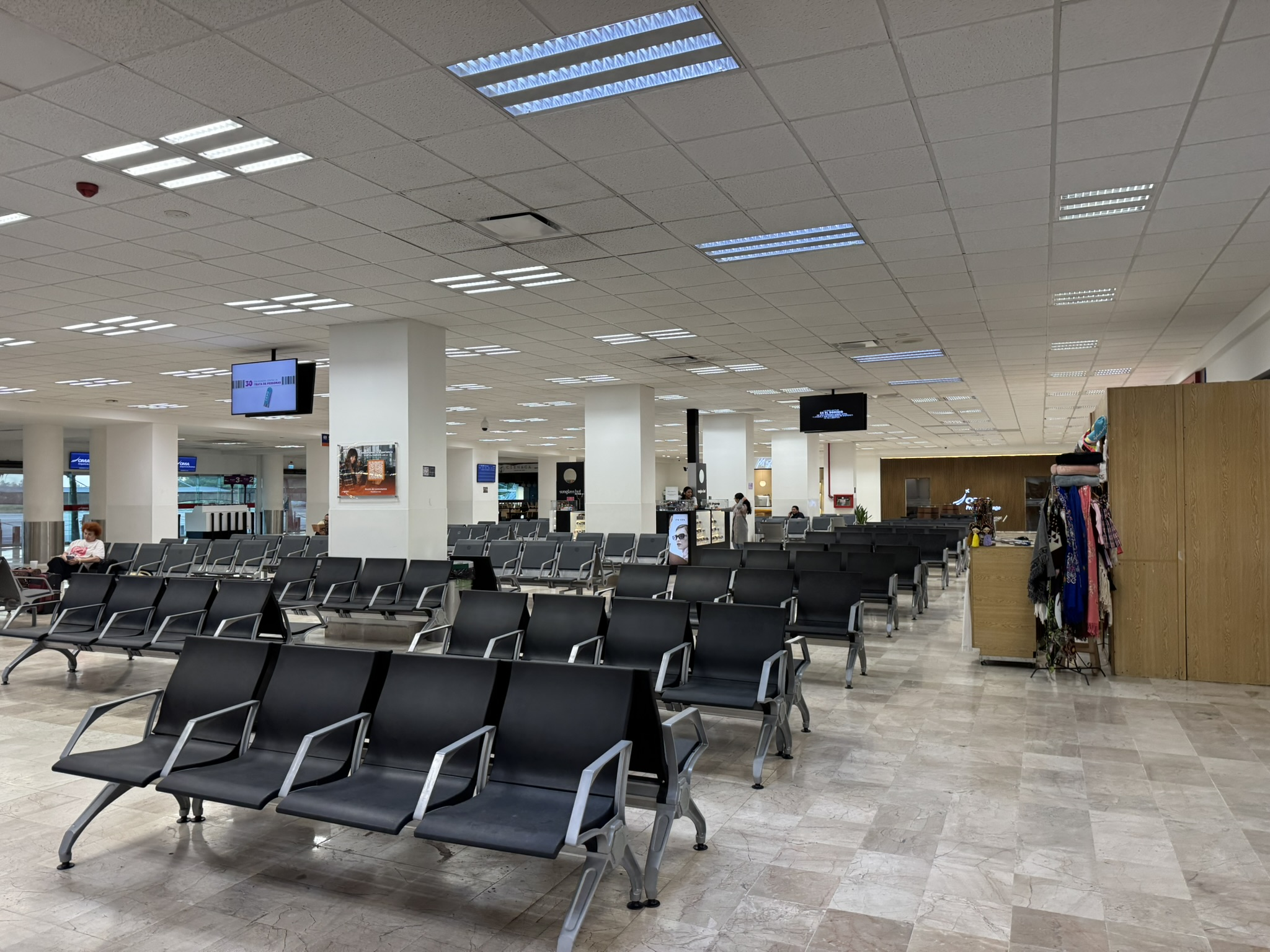
Last waiting room

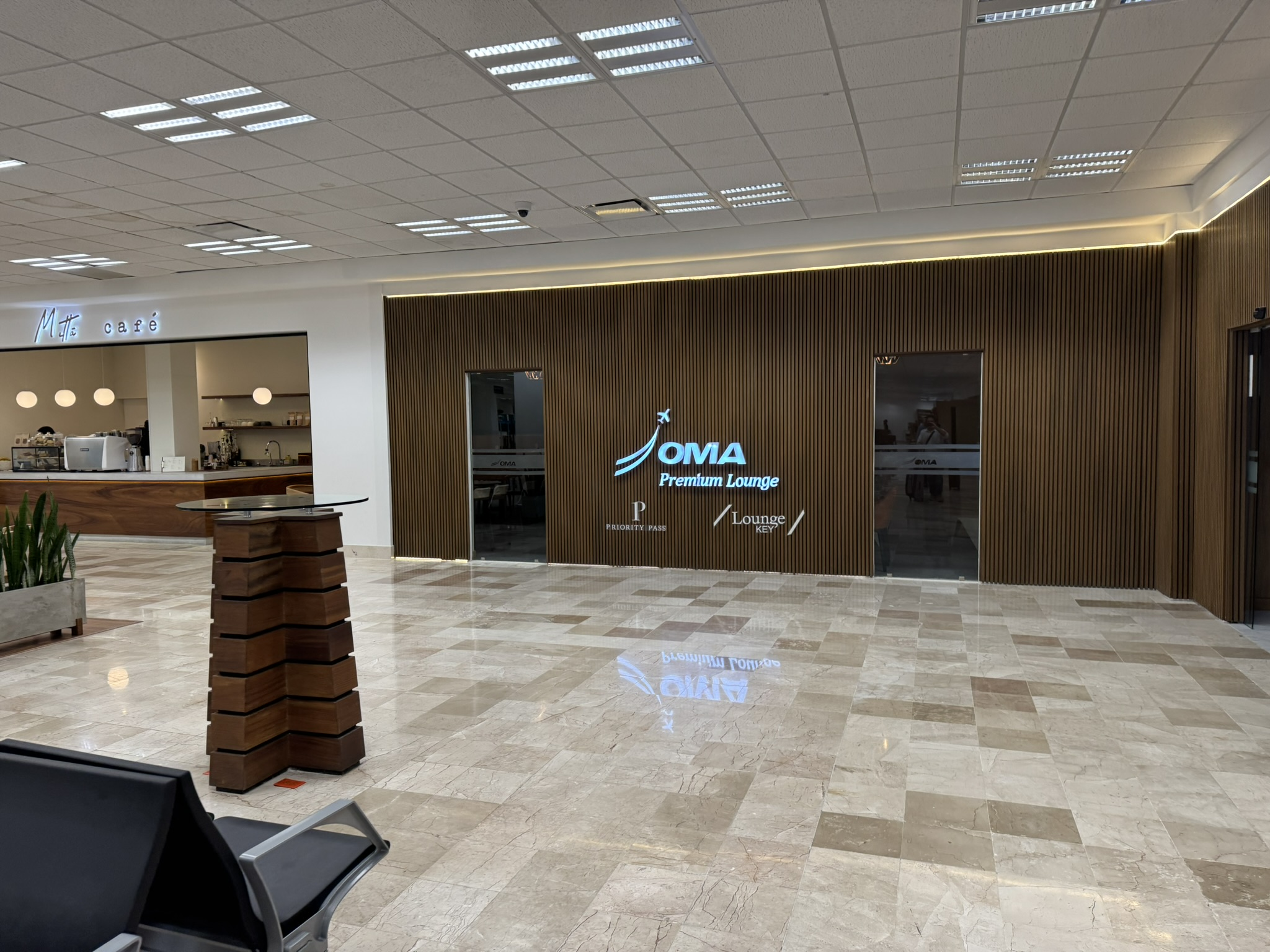
OMA Premium Lounge

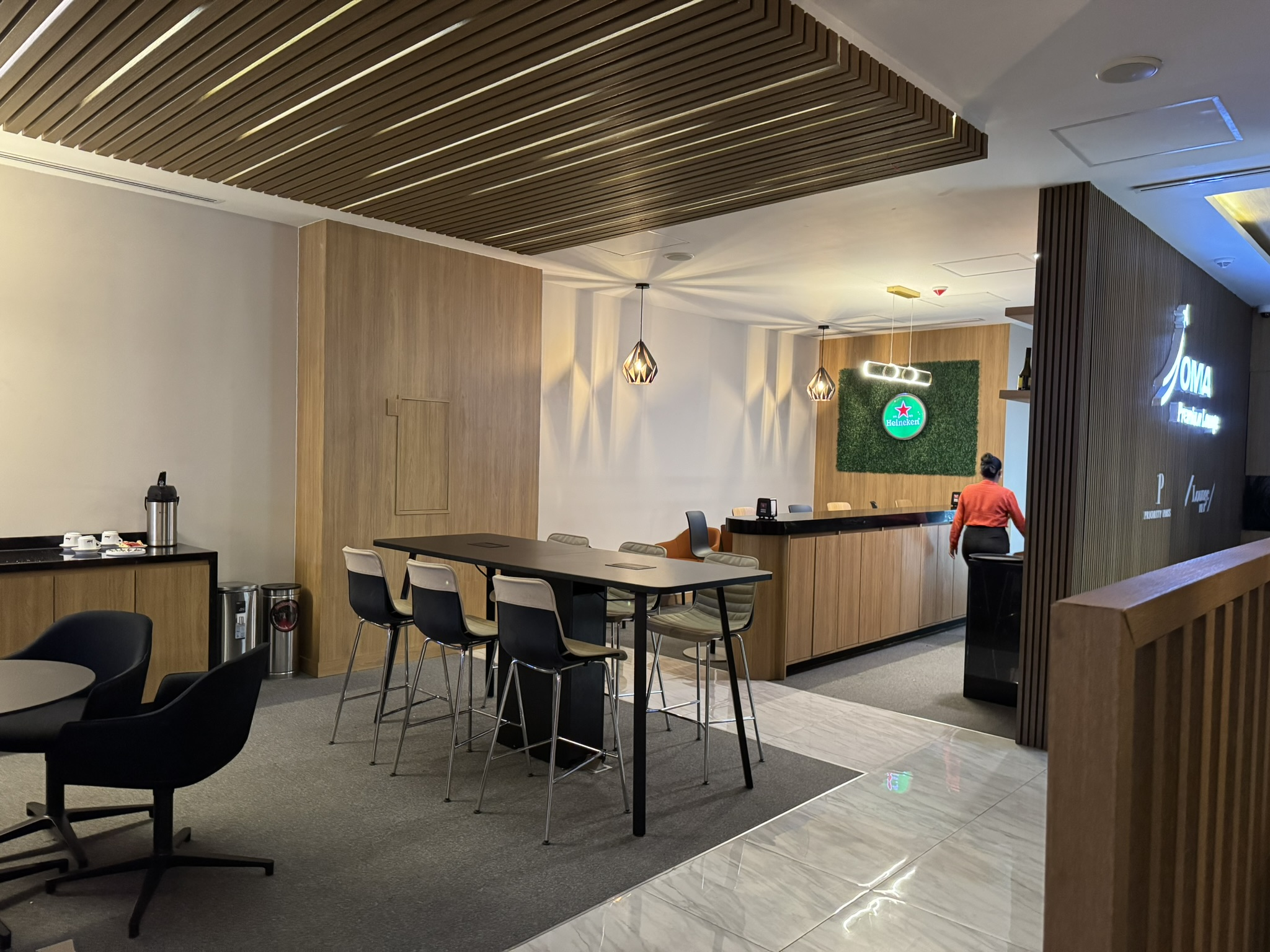
OMA Premium Lounge

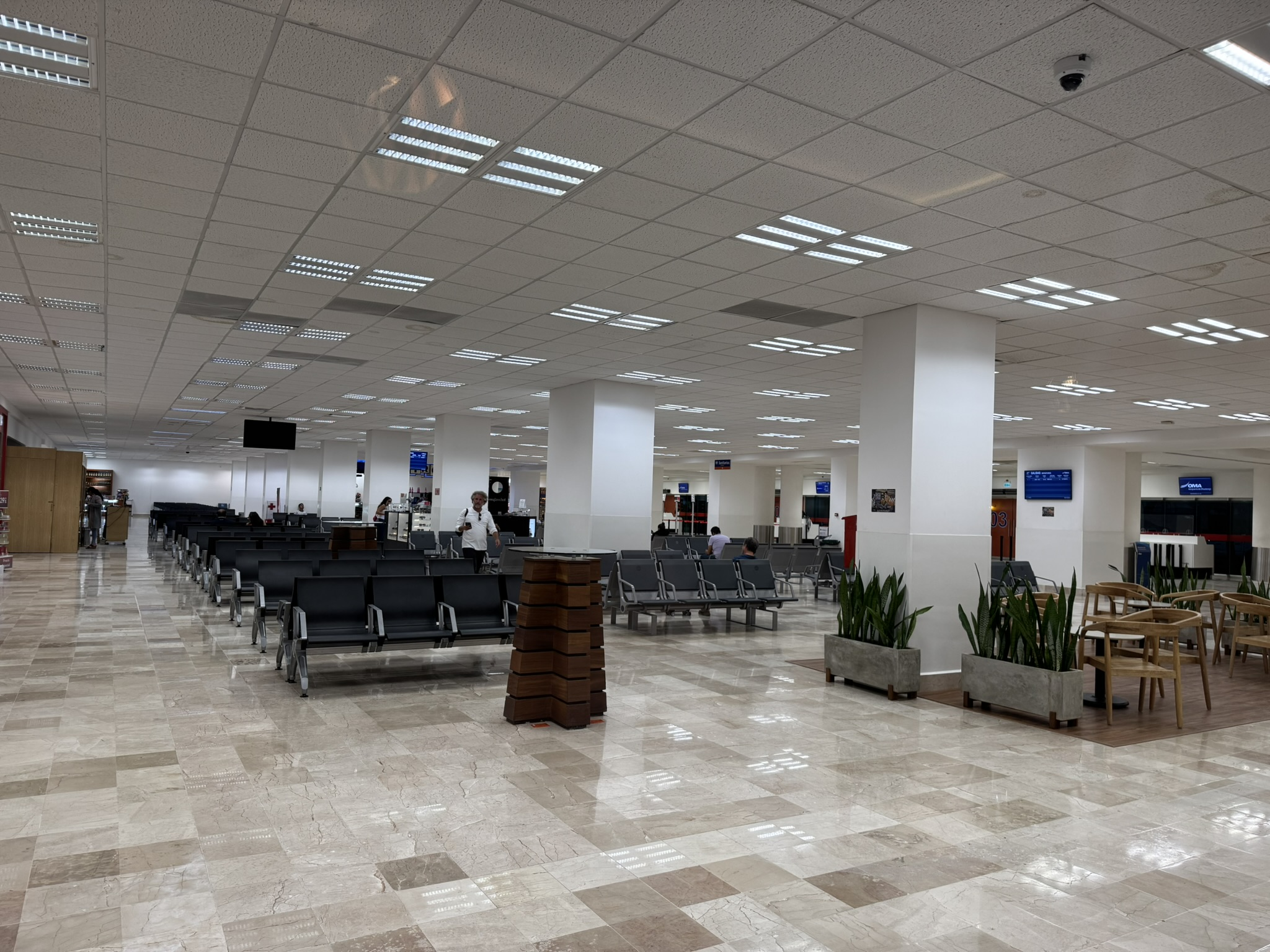
Last waiting room

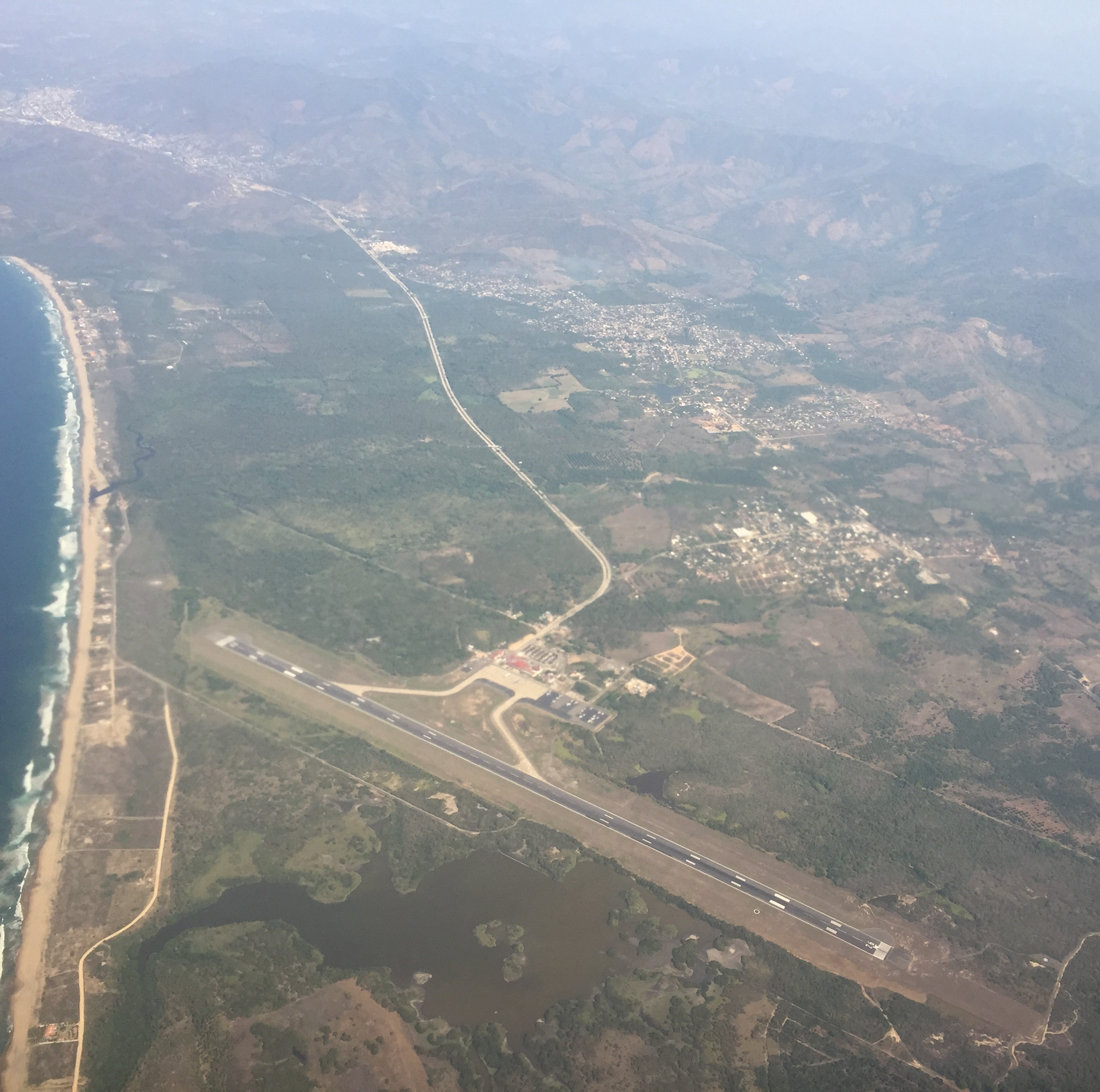
Aerial view of ZIH

== Facilities ==
Ixtapa-Zihuatanejo International Airport is situated at an elevation of 8 metres (26 ft) above mean sea level, with its grounds adjacent to the coast. The airport infrastructure includes one passenger terminal and a single runway designated as 09/27, measuring 2,500 metres (8,200 ft) in length. The apron is equipped with six aircraft stands specifically designated for the disembarkation of narrow-body aircraft.

The passenger terminal encompasses six boarding gates and provides a range of services typical of an international airport, including a VIP lounge. Amenities such as parking, taxi services, and car rental facilities are readily available on-site. In addition to serving commercial flights, the airport accommodates charter flights, as well as executive and general aviation operations.

== Airlines and destinations ==
=== Passenger ===
Airlines	Destinations
Aeroméxico Connect	Mexico City–Benito Juárez
Air Canada	Seasonal: Montreal–Trudeau, Vancouver
Alaska Airlines	Los Angeles; Seasonal: San Francisco
American Airlines	Seasonal: Phoenix–Sky Harbor
American Eagle	Dallas/Fort Worth, Phoenix–Sky Harbor
Mexicana de Aviación	Mexico City–Felipe Ángeles
Sun Country Airlines	Seasonal: Minneapolis/St. Paul
United Airlines	Seasonal: Chicago–O'Hare
United Express	Houston–Intercontinental
Viva	Mexico City–Felipe Ángeles; Seasonal: Monterrey
Volaris	Guadalajara, Mexico City–Benito Juárez, Querétaro, Tijuana
WestJet	Seasonal: Calgary, Vancouver

=== Destination maps ===
Domestic destinations from Ixtapa-Zihuatanejo International Airport
Red = Year-round destination
Blue = Future destination
Green = Seasonal destination
International destinations from Ixtapa-Zihuatanejo International Airport
Red = Year-round destination
Blue = Future destination
Green = Seasonal destination

== Statistics ==
=== Annual Traffic ===
Passenger statistics at ZIH
Year	Total Passengers	change %
2000	690,902	Steady
2001	642,735	▼7.5%
2002	572,746	▼12.2%
2003	554,516	▼3.3%
2004	599,720	▲7.5%
2005	608,897	▲1.5%
2006	681,581	▲10.6%
2007	674,612	▼1.0%
2008	644,029	▼4.7%
2009	545,051	▼18.2%
2010	496,523	▼9.8%
2011	480,613	▼3.3%
2012	457,906	▼4.7%
2013	459,799	▲0.4%
2014	508,065	▲10.5%
2015	562,099	▲10.6%
2016	557,389	▼0.6%
2017	597,902	▲7.3%
2018	566,497	▼4.2%
2019	625,186	▲10.3%
2020	317,395	▼49.2%
2021	434,176	▲36.8%
2022	593,354	▲36.7%
2023	654,392	▲10.3%
2024	674,660	▲3.1%
2025	733,616	▲8.7%

=== Busiest routes ===
Busiest domestic routes from ZIH (Jan–Dec 2025)
Rank	Airport	Passengers
1	Mexico City, Mexico City	144,023
2	Mexico City–AIFA, State of Mexico	49,850
3	Tijuana, Baja California	32,142
4	Querétaro, Querétaro	17,212
5	Morelia, Michoacán	8,099
6	Monterrey, Nuevo León	5,972
7	Guadalajara, Jalisco	4,259
8	Acapulco, Guerrero	24
9	Toluca, State of Mexico	18

Busiest international routes from ZIH (Jan–Dec 2025)
Rank	Airport	Passengers
1	Los Angeles, United States	31,937
2	Calgary, Canada	12,732
3	Dallas/Fort Worth, United States	10,460
4	Houston–Intercontinental, United States	9,290
5	Vancouver, Canada	5,751
6	Minneapolis/St. Paul, United States	5,401
7	Phoenix–Sky Harbor, United States	4,729
8	San Francisco, United States	3,314
9	Montréal–Trudeau, Canada	1,787
10	Chicago–O'Hare, United States	1,519

== See also ==
- List of the busiest airports in Mexico
- List of airports in Mexico
- List of airports by ICAO code: M
- List of busiest airports in North America
- List of the busiest airports in Latin America
- Transportation in Mexico
- Tourism in Mexico
- Grupo Aeroportuario del Pacífico
- List of beaches in Mexico
- Triangle of the Sun
- Costa Grande of Guerrero
- Ixtapa
- Zihuatanejo
