= Pie de la Cuesta, Guerrero =

Pie de la Cuesta
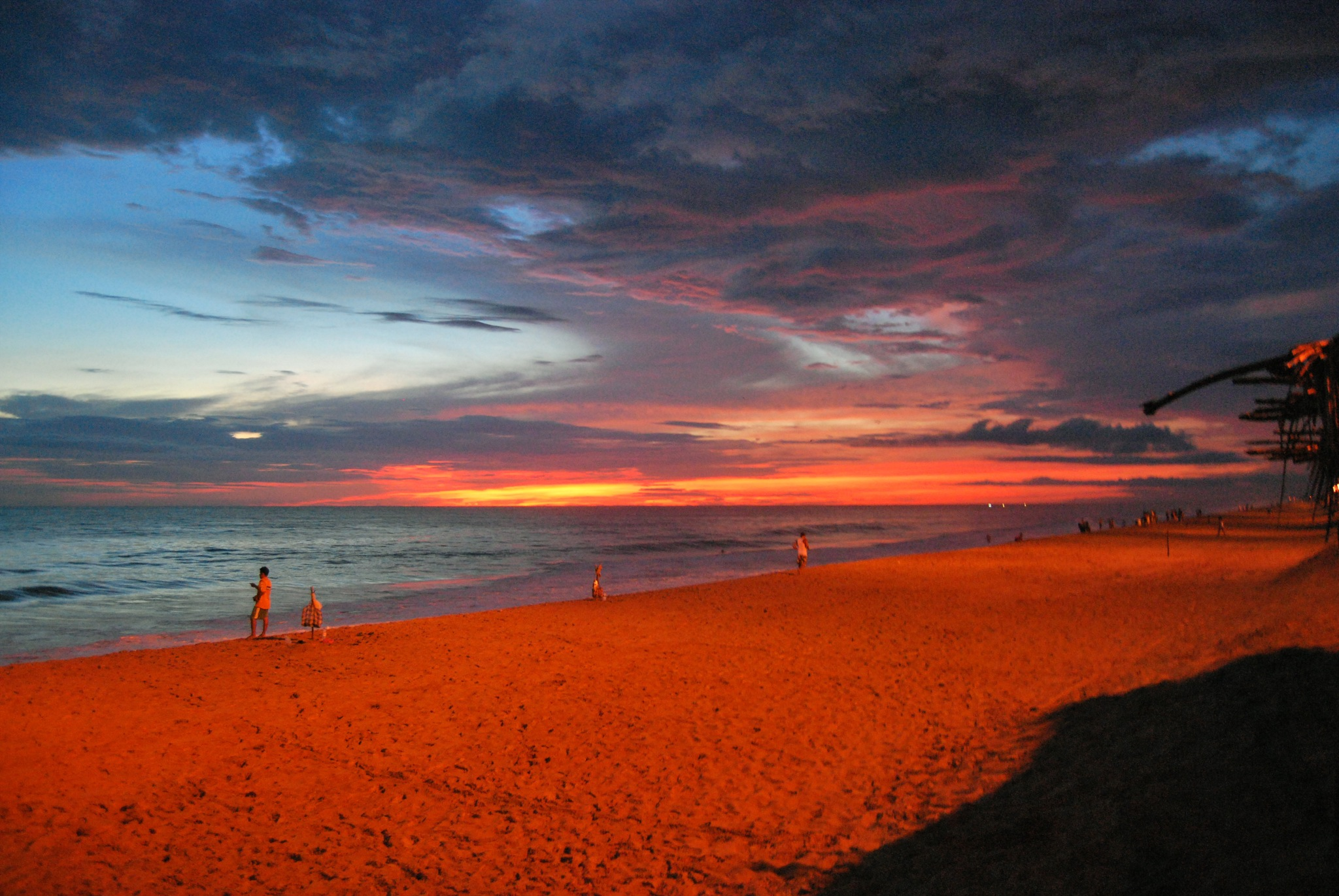
- Sunset at Pie de la Cuesta

- Location within Guerrero Location within Mexico
- Coordinates: 16°54′N 99°59′W
- Country: Mexico
- State: Guerrero
- Municipality: Acapulco
- Elevation: 0 m (0 ft)

Population
  - Demonym: Acapulqueño(a)
- Time zone: UTC-6 (CST)
- Postal code: 39300-39898
- Area code: 744

Pie de la Cuesta is a small beach resort town in the Mexican state of Guerrero, approximately 5 miles north-west of Acapulco, and it is the location of Pie de la Cuesta Air Force Base, a military base of the Mexican Air Force.

== History ==
Cave paintings from 1200 BC and petroglyphs have been discovered. They indicate the early presence of fishing settlements, with agriculture and hunting as secondary activities.

In the 1970s, when José López Portillo was president, the Judicial Police of Guerrero assassinated at least 143 alleged guerrilleras and guerrilleros from the Party of the Poor on the military base. Their bodies were dumped in the Pacific by an IAI Arava of the Escuadrón Aéreo 301 tail-number 2005.
