= Acapulco International Airport =

International airport in Acapulco, Guerrero, Mexico

Acapulco International Airport Aeropuerto Internacional de Acapulco
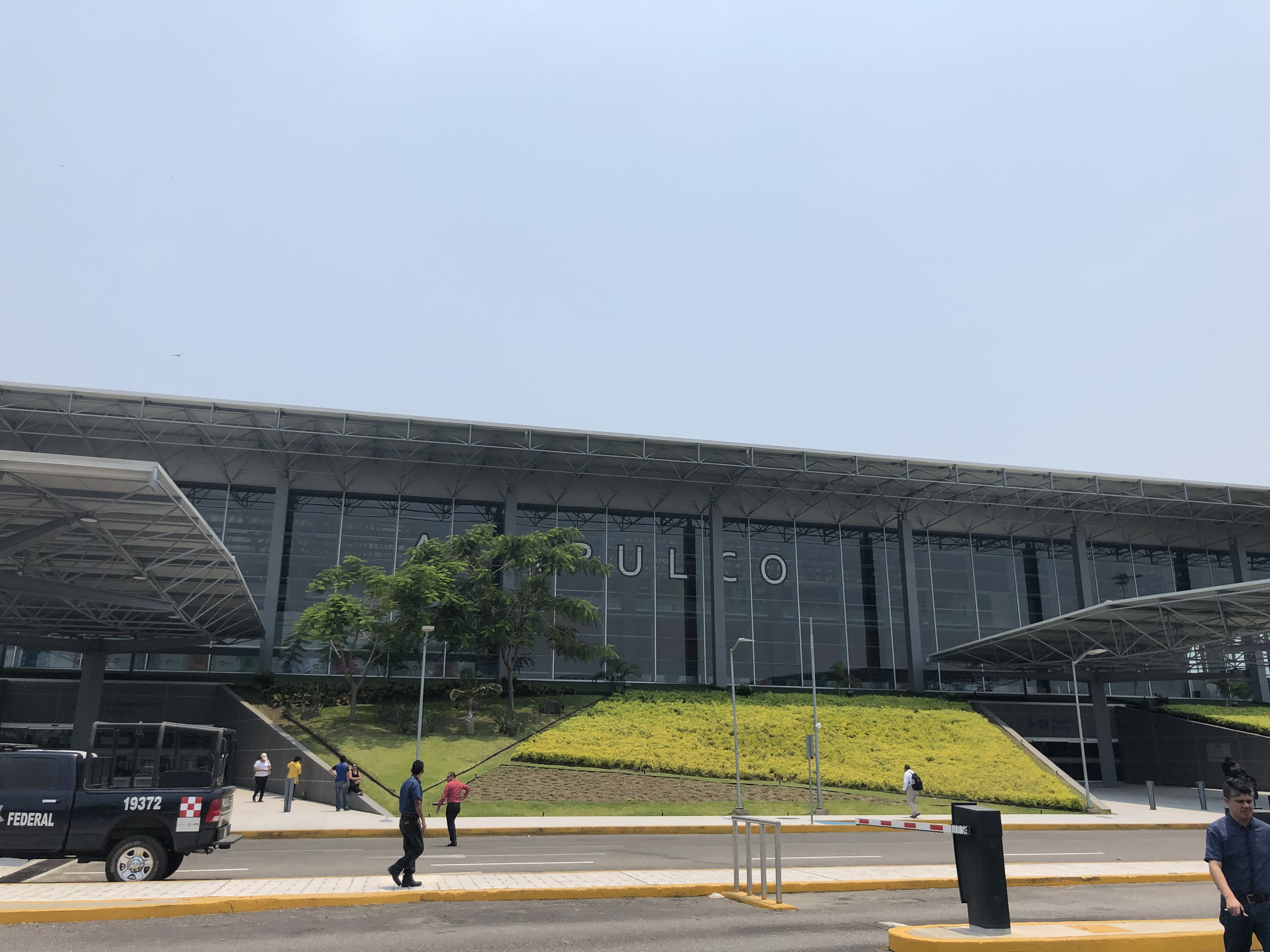
- IATA: ACA; ICAO: MMAA

Summary
- Airport type: Public
- Owner/Operator: Grupo Aeroportuario Centro Norte
- Serves: Acapulco, Guerrero, Mexico
- Time zone: CST (UTC-06:00)
- Elevation AMSL: 4 m (13 ft)
- Coordinates: 16°45′21.7″N 99°45′05.8″W
- Website: www.oma.aero/es/pasajeros/acapulco/

Map
- Location of the airport in Guerrero ACA (Mexico)

Runways
Direction	Length		Surface
Direction	m	ft	Surface
06/24	1,700	5,577	Concrete
10/28	3,302	10,832	Concrete

Statistics (2025)
- Total passengers: 684,452
- Ranking in Mexico: 34th ▲1
- Source: Grupo Aeroportuario Centro Norte

Acapulco International Airport (Spanish: Aeropuerto Internacional de Acapulco), officially Aeropuerto Internacional General Juan N. Álvarez (General Juan N. Álvarez International Airport) (IATA: ACA, ICAO: MMAA), is an international airport located in Acapulco, Guerrero, Mexico. It serves as a gateway to Acapulco, a popular Mexican tourist destination. The airport also serves charter flights and facilitates various tourism-related activities, flight training, and general aviation. It is named in honor of Juan N. Álvarez, former President of Mexico. The airport is operated by Grupo Aeroportuario Centro Norte (OMA). In 2024, the airport handled 606,610 passengers; traffic increased to 684,452 in 2025 according to OMA.

== History ==
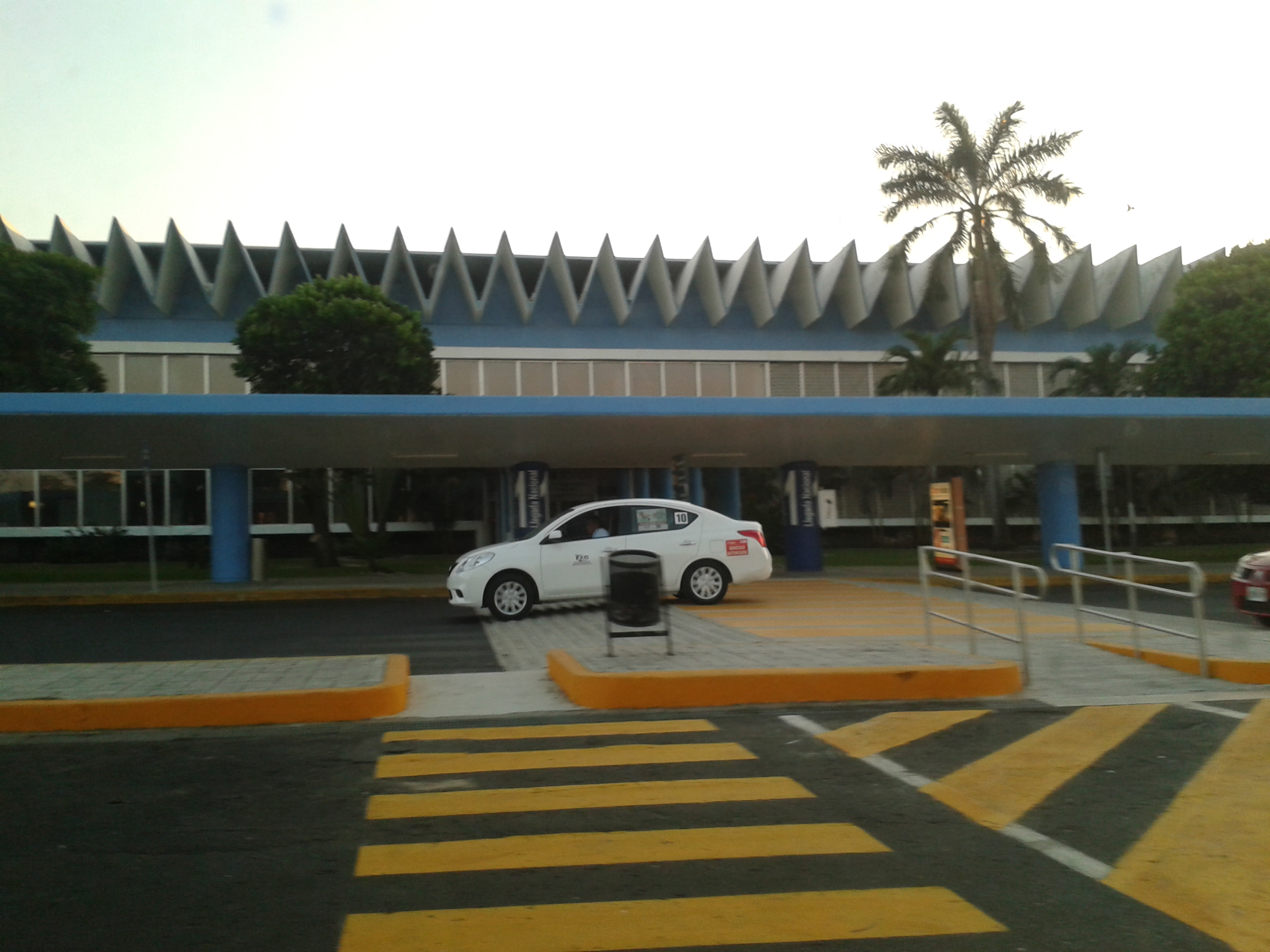
Old terminal

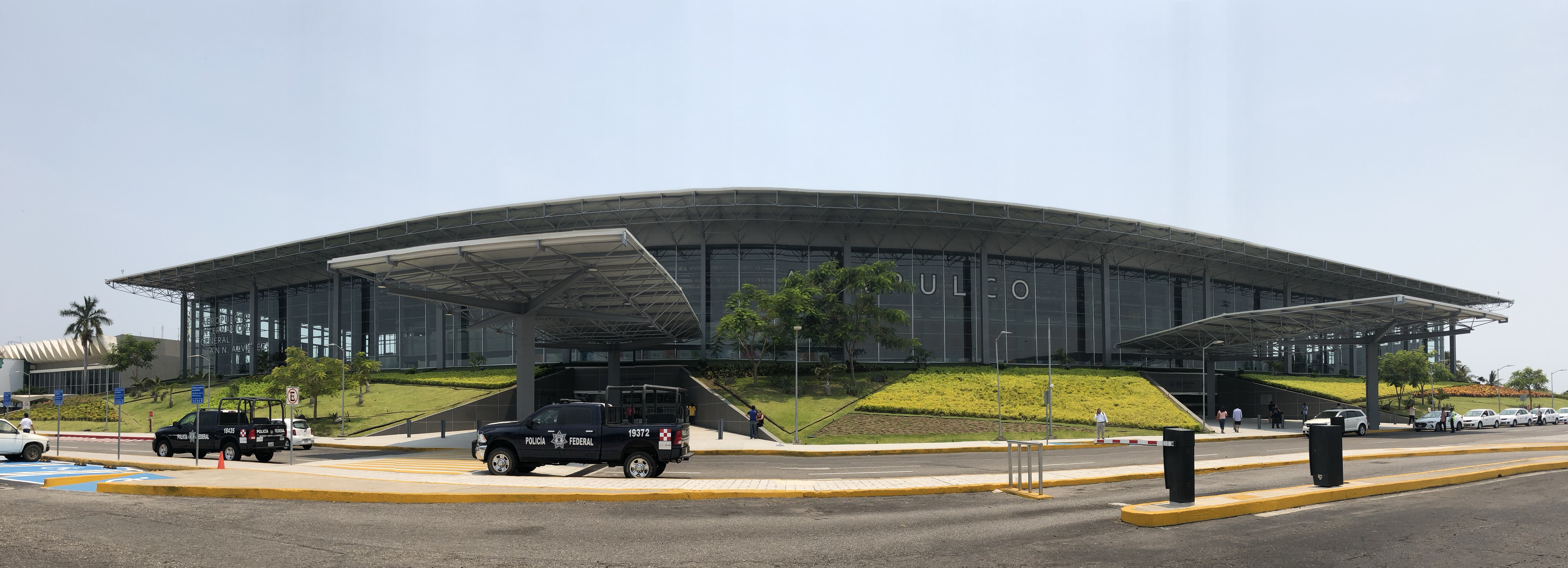
New terminal

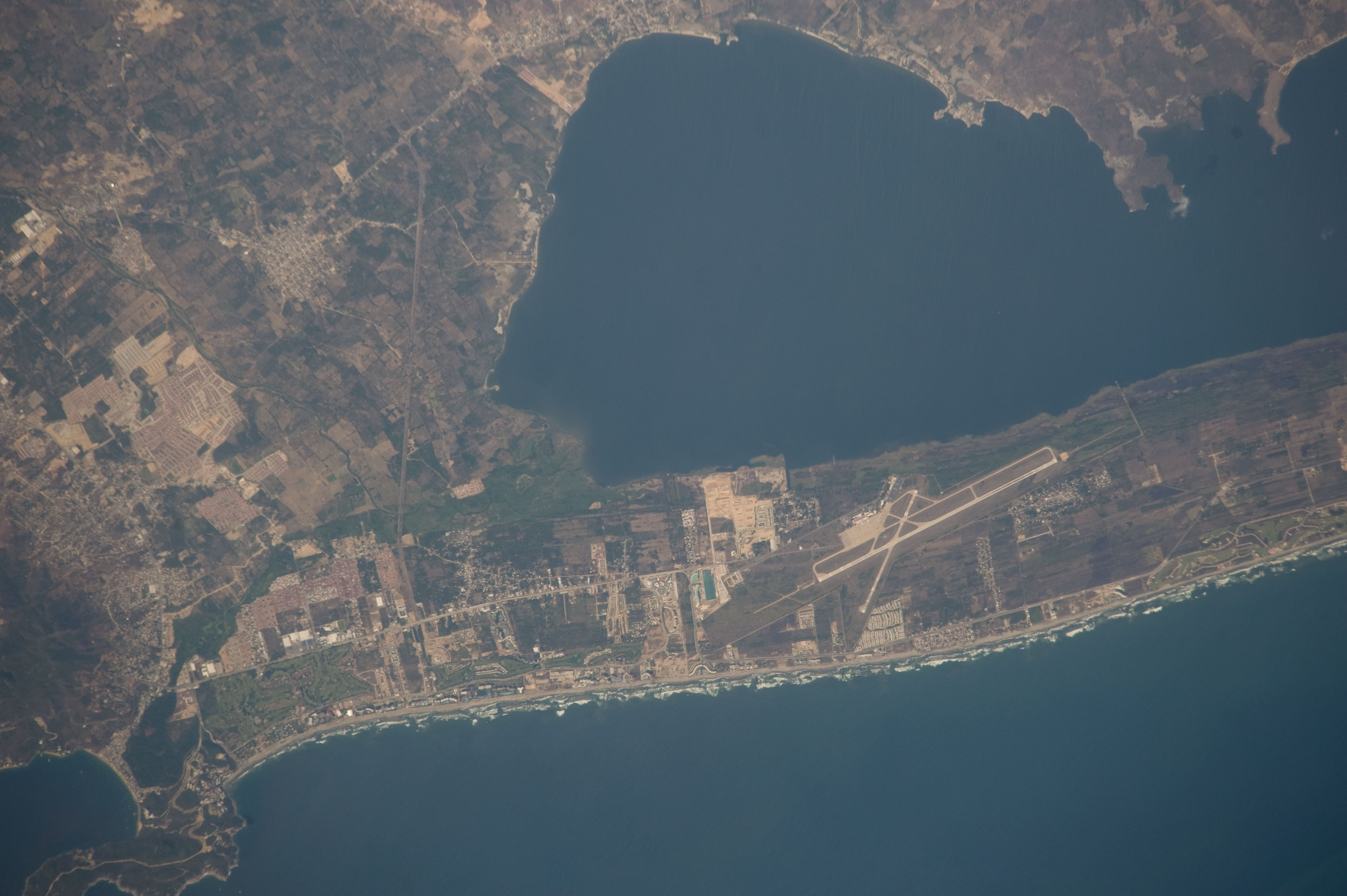
Satellite view of the airport location

In 1929, commercial flights began in Acapulco, near Playa Hornos in the city center. Aeronaves de Mexico (now Aeromexico) initiated its operations in 1934, using a single Stinson SR aircraft for flights between Mexico City and Acapulco. However, the initial location posed safety challenges, leading to the construction of a safer airport in Pie de la Cuesta in 1945.

=== Jetset era ===
Acapulco Airport has played a significant role in the development of tourism in southern Mexico. Acapulco, a well-established coastal tourist destination in Mexico, experienced a period of high popularity from the 1940s to the 1970s. It became the preferred destination for the Jetset, Hollywood celebrities, and wealthy individuals seeking exclusive beach vacations in an exotic setting. During this surge in popularity, the decision was made to construct a new airport and transfer the Pie de la Cuesta facilities to the Mexican Air Force, now known as Air Force Base No. 7.

The current Acapulco Airport, constructed in 1954, is situated 16 kilometres (9.9 mi) southeast of the city center, positioned between Tres Palos Lagoon and the Pacific Ocean in a zone known as Plan de los Amates. It was once considered a pioneering model for subsequent airport constructions due to its modern passenger terminal design and the fact that it was one of the first airports built with comprehensive planning and foresight. The Acapulco Airport received flights from numerous international destinations, primarily from the United States and Canada. It was one of the few airports, apart from Mexico City, that was served by major United States airlines such as Eastern, Braniff, and American. For a brief period, it was a stopover on the Kangaroo air route connecting Australia and the United Kingdom via the Eastern Hemisphere. This route, known as the "Fiesta" route, involved flights from London to Sydney with layovers in Bermuda, Nassau, Mexico City, Acapulco, Tahiti, and Fiji in 1965. Several other airlines, including Delta, Alaska Airlines, Air Canada, Alitalia, LTU, Northwest, US Airways, Western, Mexicana, and Aeromar, have also operated at this airport.

Between 1970 and 1973, the airport underwent significant construction and improvement projects, including the construction of a new, air-conditioned passenger terminal, a new parking area, an access road, a control tower, an apron, taxiways, perimeter roads, fencing, and facilities for fuel storage.

=== 21st century ===
However, in the 21st century, the Mexican drug war has had a detrimental effect on tourism in Acapulco, resulting in a decline in the airport's importance as an international gateway. The airport reached its peak in terms of passenger numbers in 2008 but has since been experiencing a decline. In 2018, the terminal was renovated, with the construction of a new terminal building adjacent to the old one, with plans to eventually demolish the old structure.

Furthermore, the airport has been subjected to the impact of hurricanes on multiple occasions. In 2013, Tropical Storm Manuel led to severe flooding at the airport, which forced the suspension of airport activities for several days. In 2023, Hurricane Otis, classified as a Category 5 hurricane, caused extensive damage at the airport when it made landfall nearby.

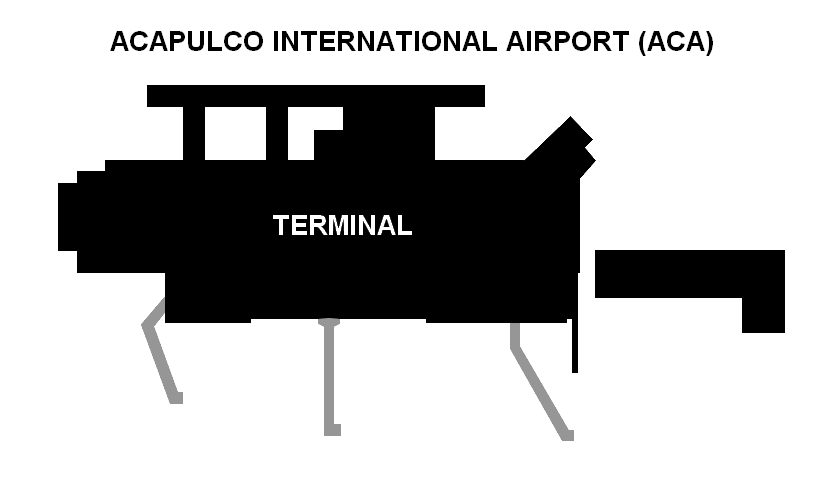
Terminal diagram

== Facilities ==
The airport covers an area of 450 hectares (1,100 acres). It is situated at an elevation of 4 metres (13 ft) above mean sea level. The airport has two runways: Runway 06/24, which is 1,700 metres (5,600 ft) long and 35 metres (115 ft) wide, and Runway 10/28, which is 3,300 metres (10,800 ft) long and 45 metres (148 ft) wide. Both runways can accommodate up to 40 operations per hour, and the airport can handle jets as large as the Boeing 747. Additionally, the airport has six taxiways leading to an apron with 18 parking positions.

The passenger terminal is a two-story building with a total floor area of 19,000 square metres (200,000 sq ft) and an annual passenger capacity of 1.3 million. It combines concrete and steel structures with extensive interior and exterior gardens, sleek windows, high ceilings, and steel accents in clear geometric shapes. The main hall serves essential functions, including check-in and baggage handling on the eastern side, and the arrivals section on the west side, which includes customs and immigration facilities. The arrivals section also offers car rental services, taxi stands, snack bars, and souvenir shops. The upper floor of the terminal houses the security checkpoint and a 3,600 square metres (39,000 sq ft) departure lounge equipped with a food court, duty-free shops, a VIP lounge, and a concourse with six gates, three of which are equipped with jet bridges.

Adjacent to the terminal, there are other facilities such as civil aviation hangars, cargo and logistics companies, and courier services. Additionally, there is a dedicated general aviation terminal that supports various activities, including tourism, flight training, executive aviation, and general aviation.

== Airlines and destinations ==
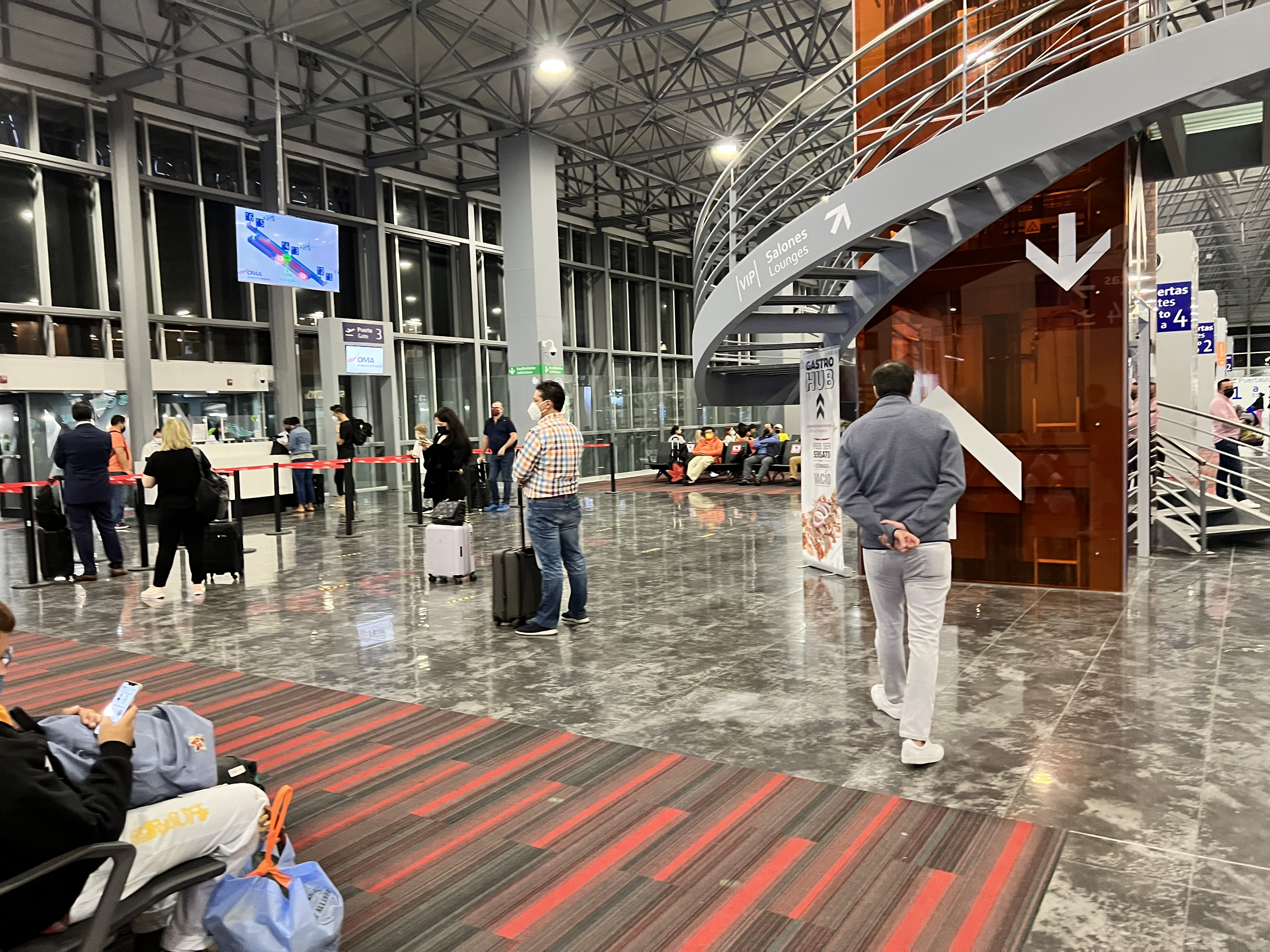
Departures concourse

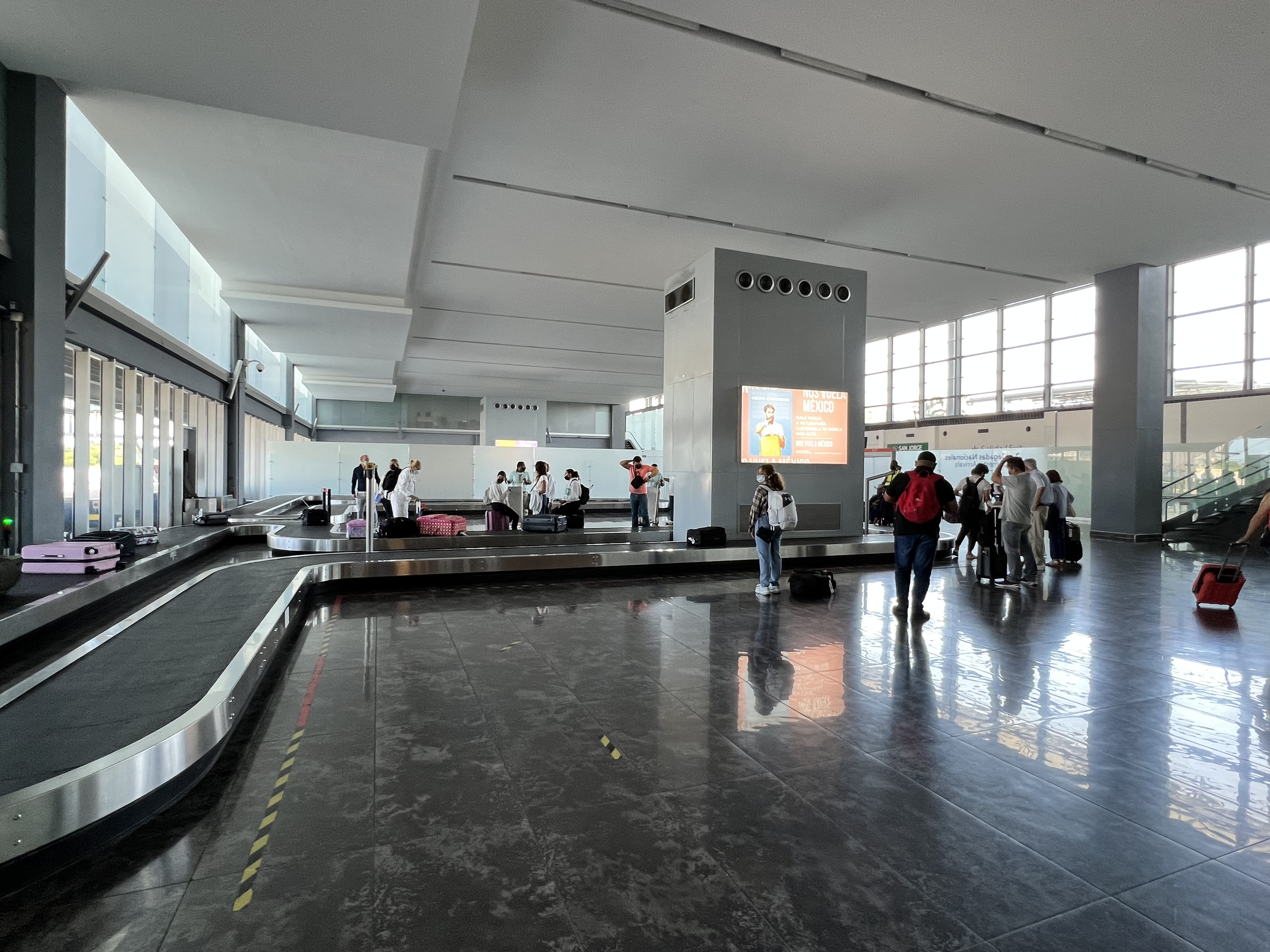
Baggage claim area

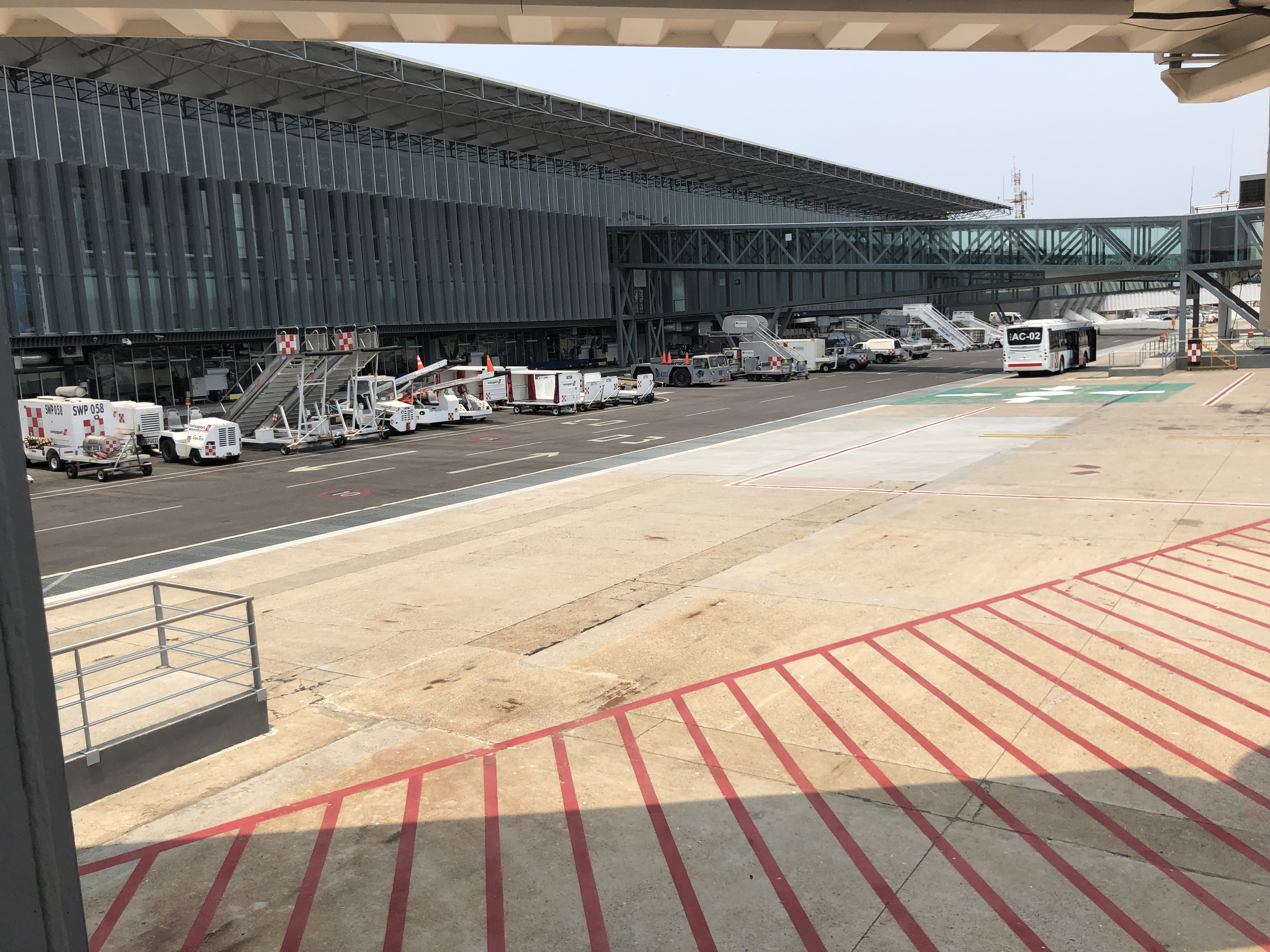
Terminal airside

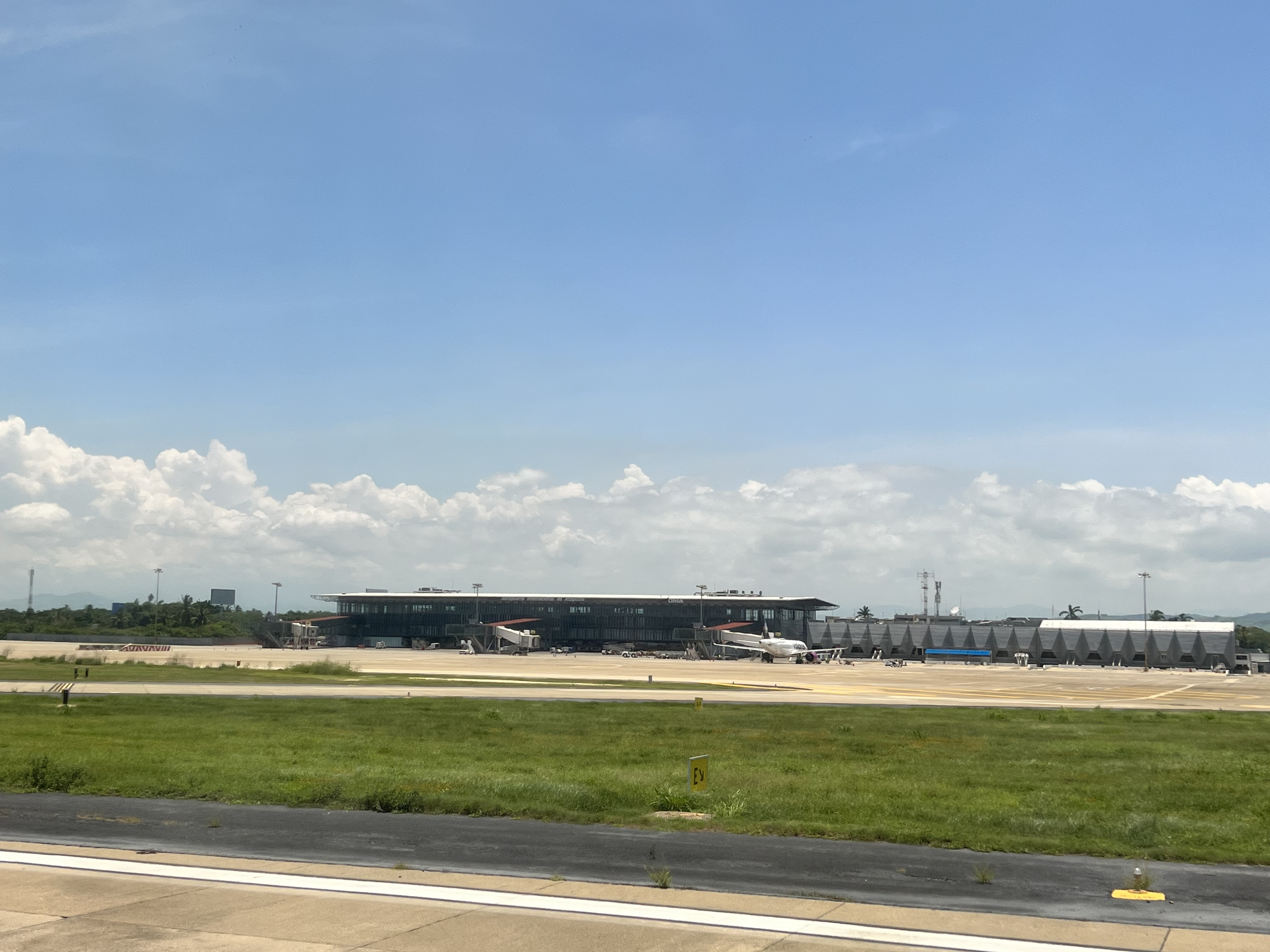
Passenger terminal

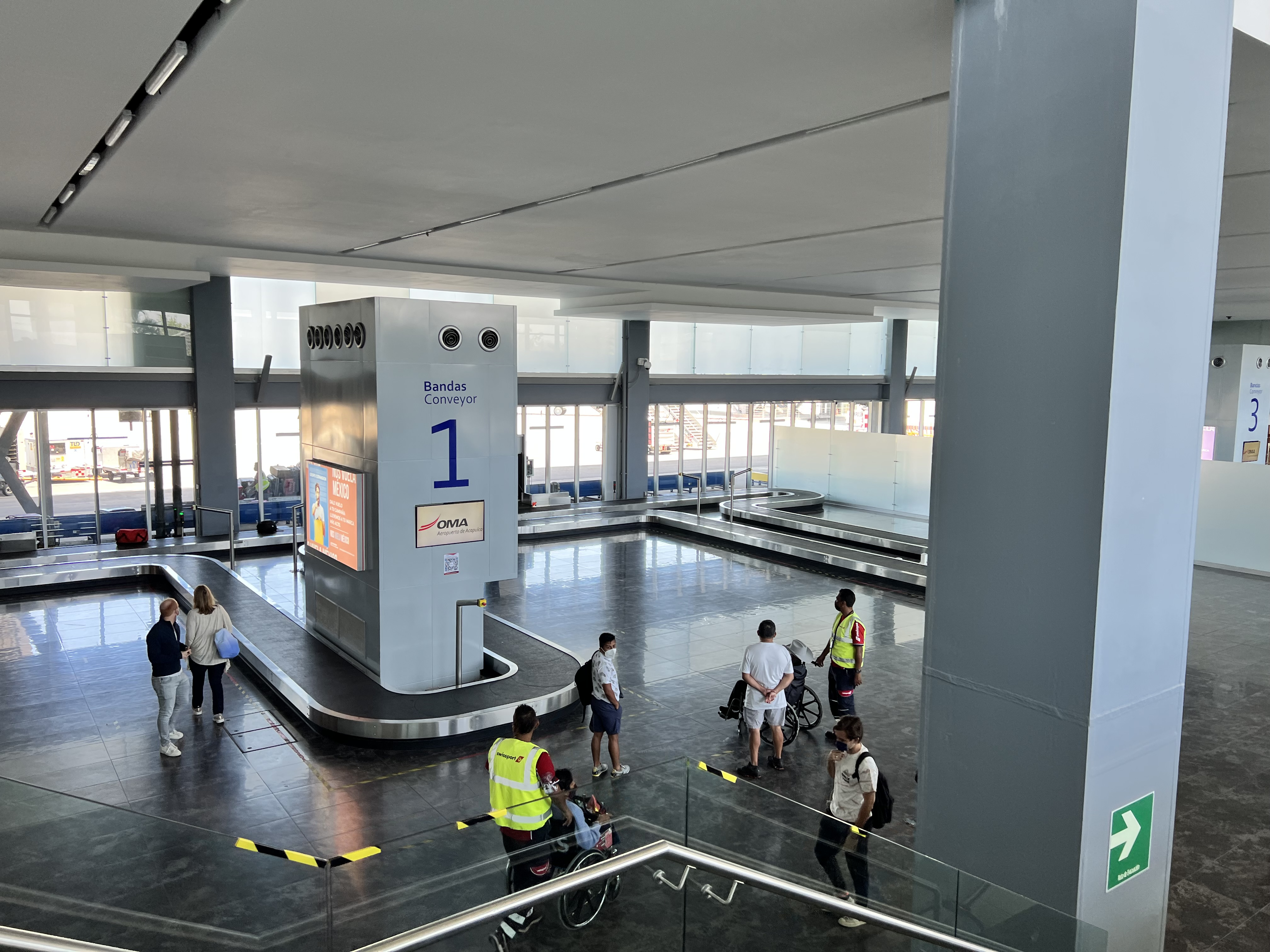
Baggage claim area

=== Passenger ===
Airlines	Destinations
Aeroméxico	Mexico City–Benito Juárez
Aeroméxico Connect	Mexico City–Benito Juárez
Air Transat	Seasonal: Montréal–Trudeau
American Eagle	Seasonal: Dallas/Fort Worth
Mexicana de Aviación	Mexico City–Felipe Ángeles
United Express	Seasonal: Houston–Intercontinental
Viva	Cancún, Mexico City–Felipe Ángeles, Monterrey
Volaris	Guadalajara, Mexico City–Benito Juárez, Puebla (begins December 1, 2026), Querétaro, Tijuana

=== Destination maps ===
Domestic destinations from Acapulco International Airport
Red = Year-round destination
Blue = Future destination
Green = Seasonal destination
International destinations from Acapulco International Airport
Red = Year-round destination
Blue = Future destination
Green = Seasonal destination

== Statistics ==
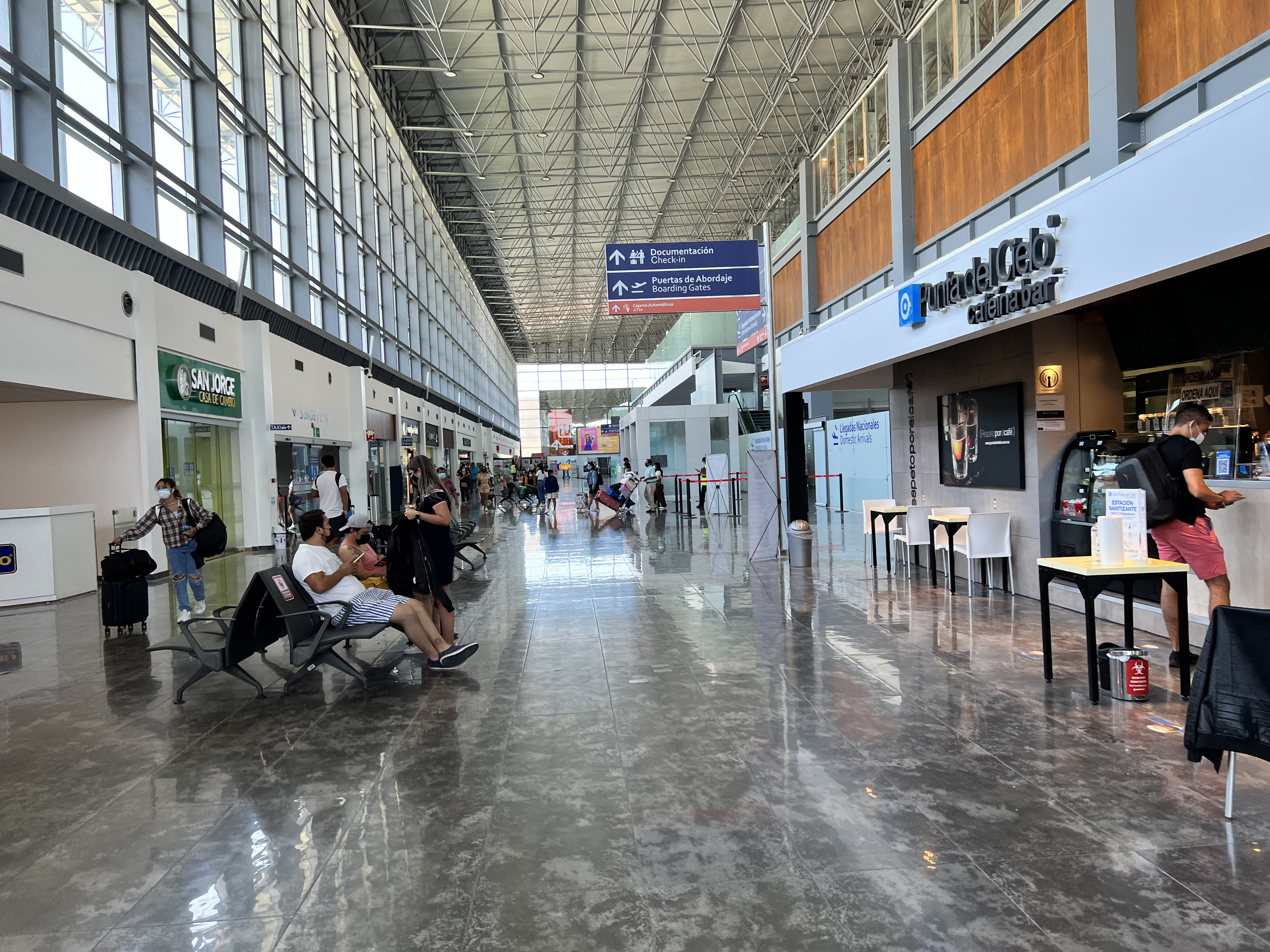
Main hall

=== Annual traffic ===
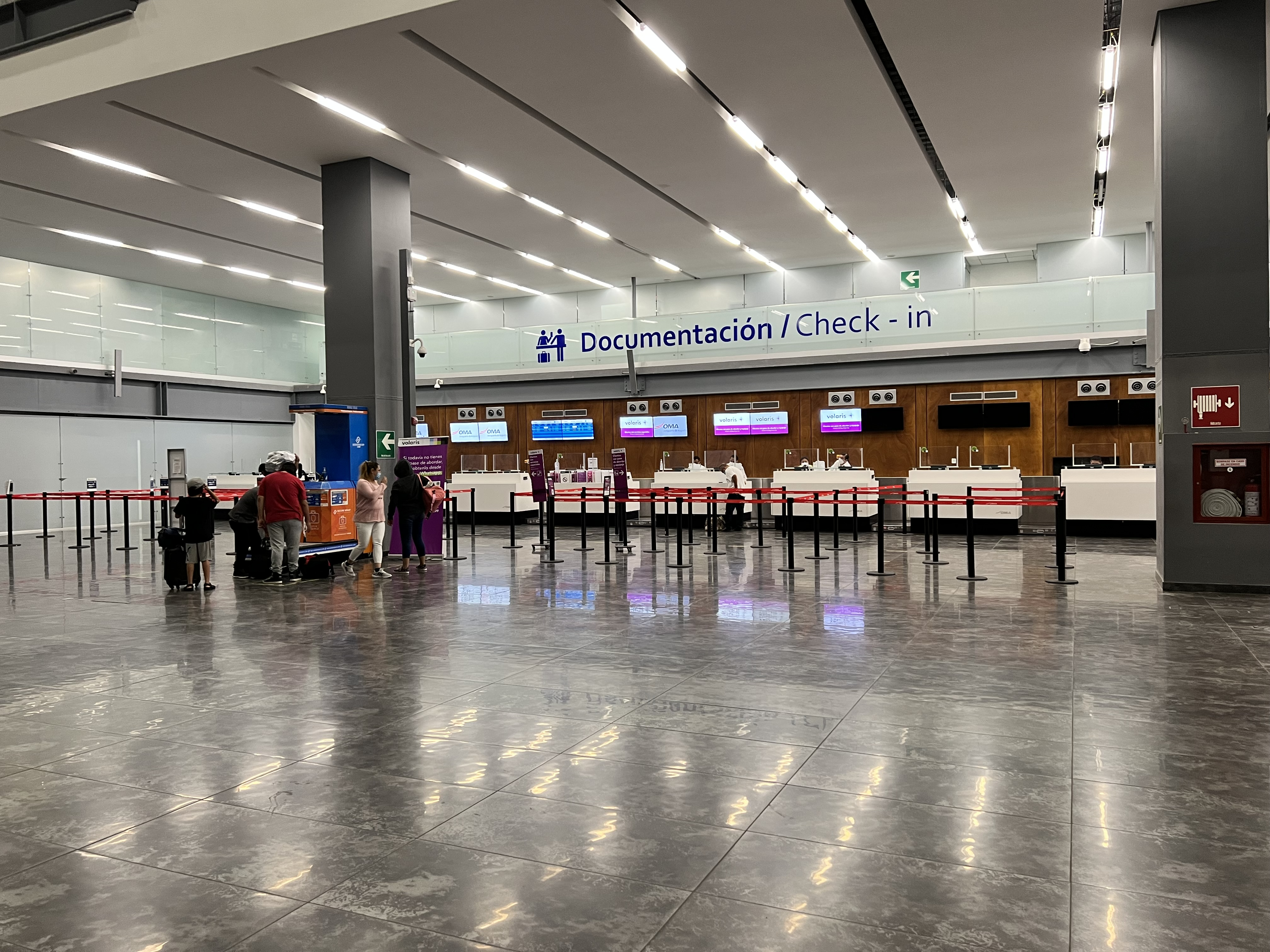
Check-in area

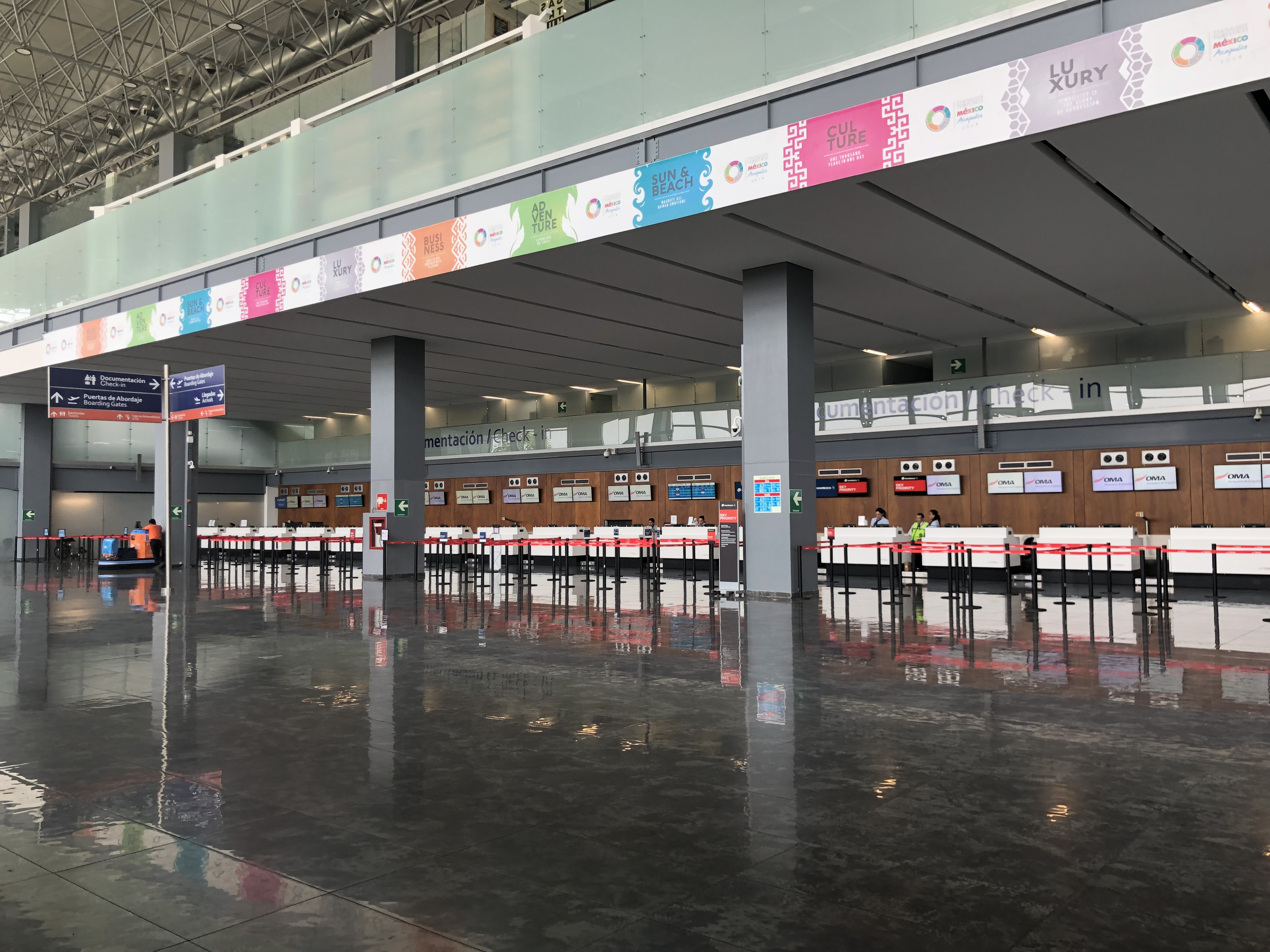
Check-in area

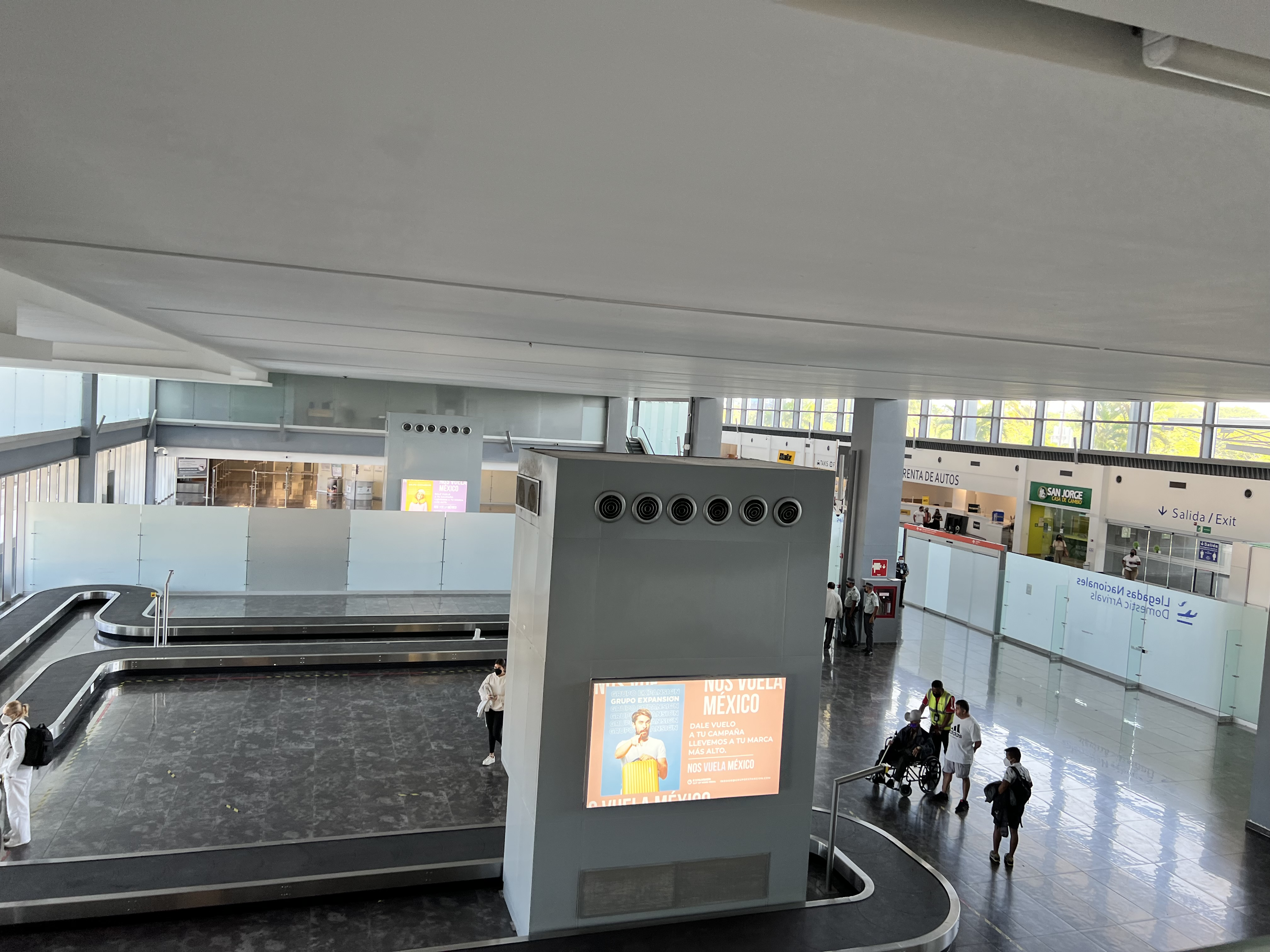
Baggage claim area

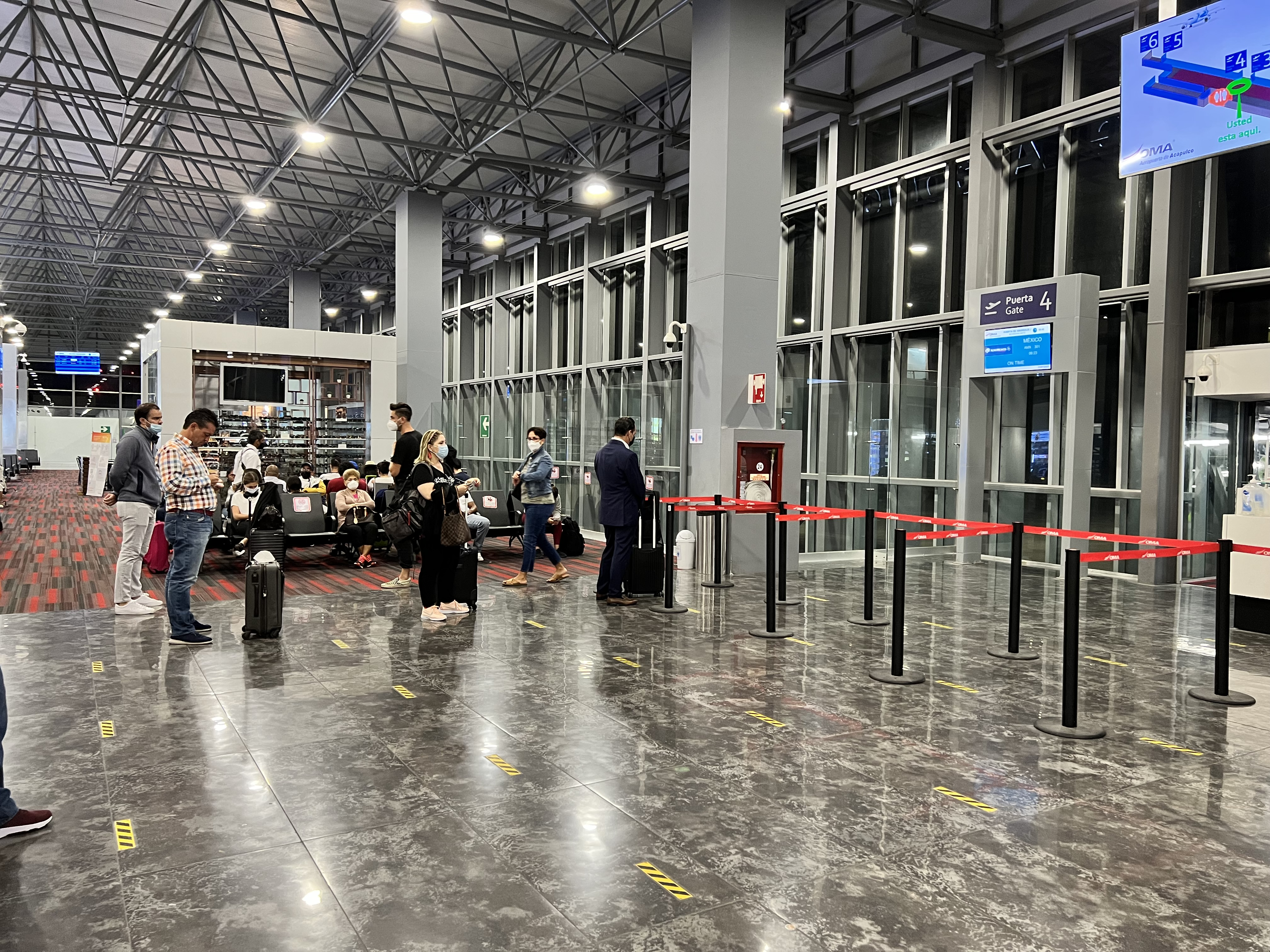
Departures lounge

Annual passenger traffic at ACA (2001–present)
Year	Passengers	% change	Domestic passengers	% change	International passengers	% change
2001	940,197	▼7.6%	569,195	▲3.3%	371,002	▼20.6%
2002	793,420	▼15.6%	523,172	▼8.0%	270,248	▼27.1%
2003	774,349	▼2.4%	527,208	▲0.7%	247,141	▼8.5%
2004	821,301	▲6.0%	542,437	▲2.8%	278,864	▲12.8%
2005	880,190	▲7.1%	554,988	▲2.3%	325,202	▲16.6%
2006	994,393	▲13.0%	638,543	▲15.1%	355,850	▲9.4%
2007	1,057,332	▲6.3%	740,289	▲15.9%	317,043	▼10.9%
2008	1,087,974	▲2.9%	818,671	▲10.6%	269,303	▼15.1%
2009	839,048	▼22.9%	636,418	▼22.3%	202,630	▼24.8%
2010	736,878	▼12.2%	547,420	▼14.0%	189,458	▼6.5%
2011	596,326	▼19.1%	495,018	▼9.6%	101,308	▼46.5%
2012	546,951	▼8.2%	486,268	▼1.7%	60,683	▼40.1%
2013	617,079	▲12.9%	560,945	▲15.4%	56,134	▼7.5%
2014	631,570	▲2.3%	576,042	▲2.7%	55,528	▼1.1%
2015	730,382	▲15.7%	677,698	▲17.7%	52,684	▼5.1%
2016	718,493	▼1.7%	664,418	▼2.0%	54,075	▲2.6%
2017	673,809	▼6.2%	631 829	▼4.9%	53 295	▼1.4%
2018	739,120	▲9.7%	681 587	▲7.9%	57 533	▲8.0%
2019	875,315	▲18.4%	814,636	▲19.5%	60,679	▲5.5%
2020	395,948	▼54.8%	361,029	▼55.7%	34,919	▼42.5%
2021	670,239	▲69.3%	623,763	▲72.8%	46,476	▲33.1%
2022	838,991	▲25.2%	773,846	▲24.1%	65,145	▲40.2%
2023	894,012	▲6.6%	838,123	▲8.3%	55,889	▼14.2%
2024	601,610	▼32.7%	571,886	▼31.8%	29,724	▼46.8%
2025	684,452	▲13.8%	636,899	▲11.4%	47,553	▲60.0%

=== Busiest routes ===
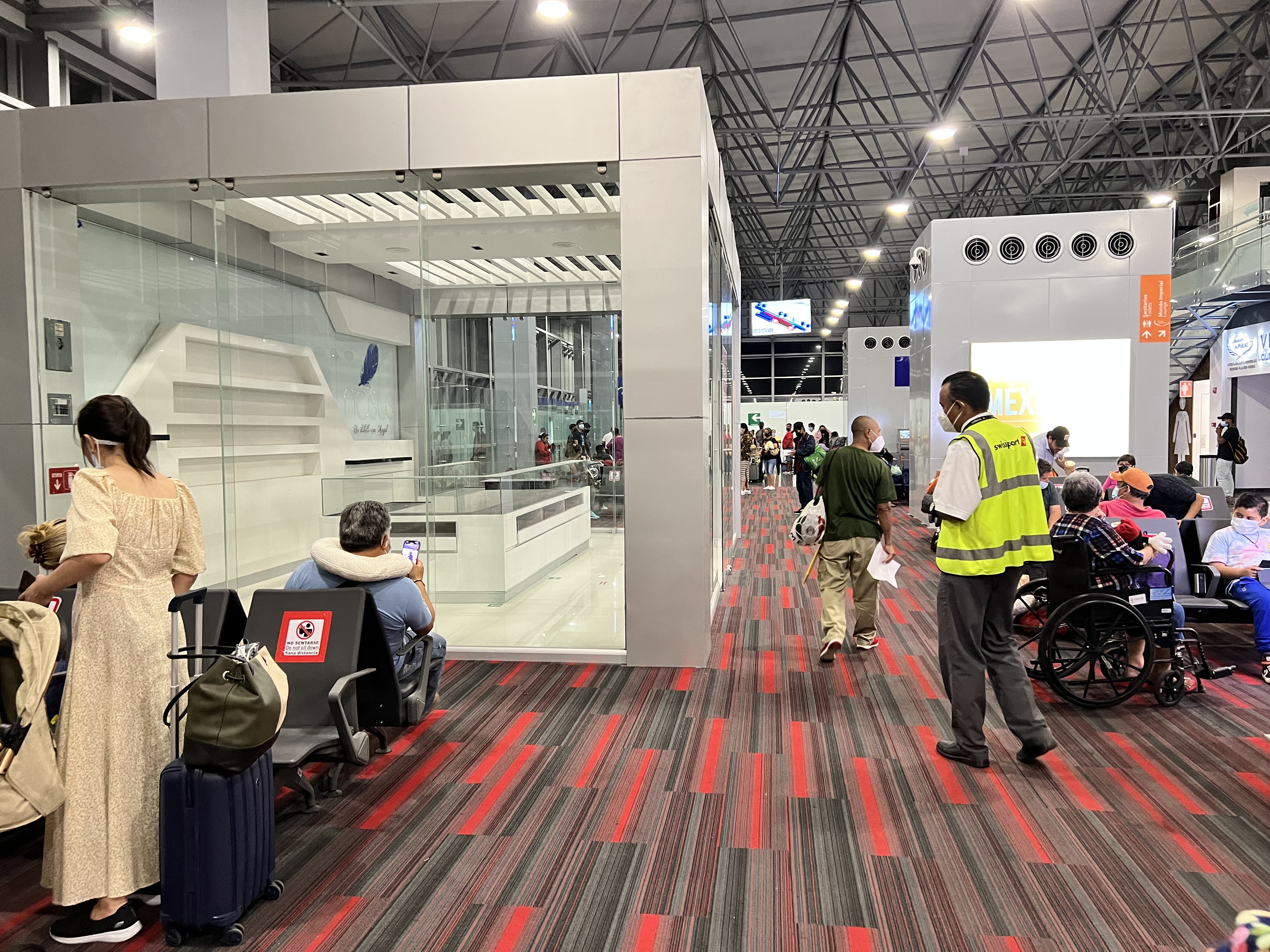
Departures lounge

Busiest routes from ACA (Jan–Dec 2025)
Rank	Airport	Passengers
1	Mexico City, Mexico City	140,592
2	Tijuana, Baja California	83,321
3	Guadalajara, Jalisco	52,242
4	Mexico City–AIFA, State of Mexico	22,145
5	Monterrey, Nuevo León	14,461
6	Montréal–Trudeau, Canada	4,148
7	Houston–Intercontinental, United States	4,125
8	Dallas/Fort Worth, United States	3,691
9	Toluca, State of Mexico	255
10	Querétaro, Querétaro	233

== See also ==
- List of the busiest airports in Mexico
- List of airports in Mexico
- List of airports by ICAO code: M
- List of busiest airports in North America
- List of the busiest airports in Latin America
- Transportation in Mexico
- Tourism in Mexico
- Grupo Aeroportuario Centro Norte
- List of beaches in Mexico
- Triangle of the Sun
- Kangaroo Route
