= Triangle of the Sun =

Triangle of the Sun Triángulo del Sol
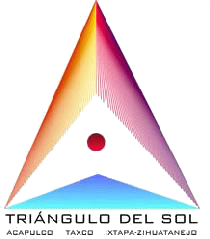

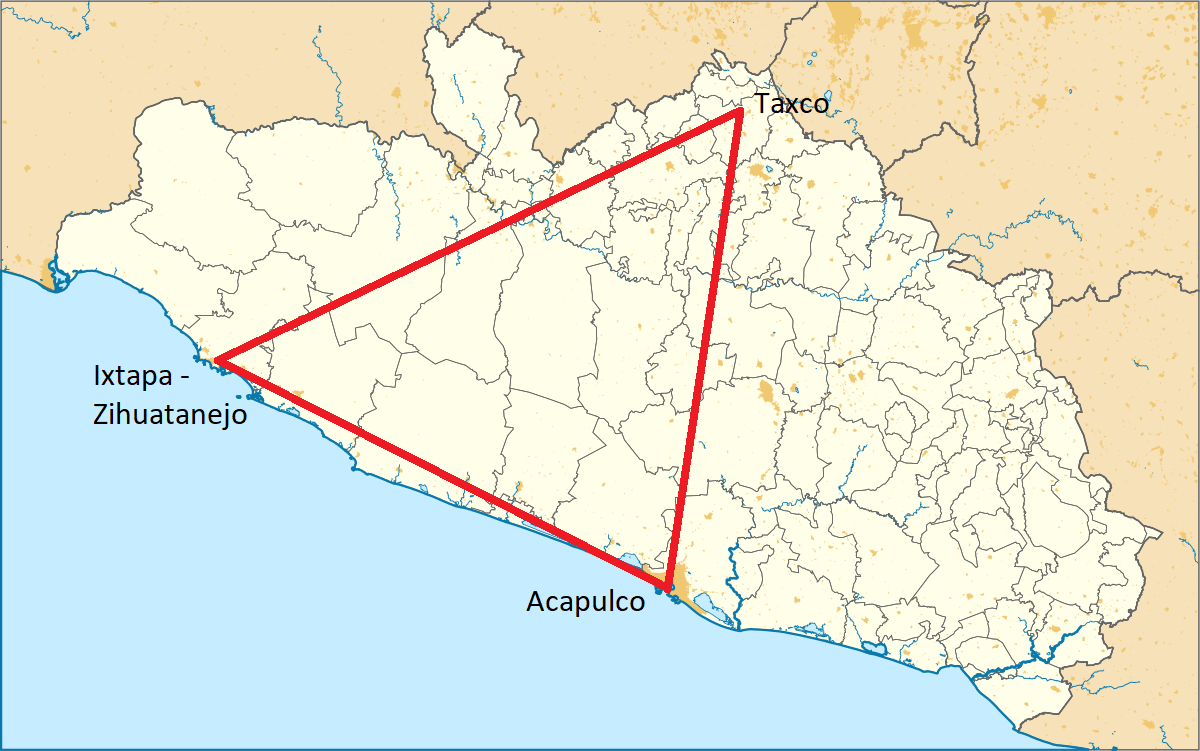
- Location of the Triangle of the Sun
- Country: Mexico
- State: Guerrero
- Cities: List: Acapulco; Ixtapa; Taxco; Zihuatanejo

Population (2010)
  - Total: 802,096
- Time zone: UTC−6 (CST)
  - Summer (DST): UTC−5 (CDT)

The Triangle of the Sun is a tourist area in the state of Guerrero that runs through the Sierra Madre del Sur of that state. This tourist area is formed by the cities of Acapulco in the south, the pair of Ixtapa–Zihuatanejo in the north, and Taxco in the center of the state. These cities are those that receive more tourists in Guerrero.

== Acapulco ==
Acapulco is the largest port city and populous state of Guerrero and the most visited by tourists and internacionales.

This destination got its fame from the 1950s and 1970s also becoming a favorite of Hollywood stars such as Elizabeth Taylor, Elvis Presley, among others.

Acapulco was the first tourist destination in Mexico which was released worldwide. And now the fate that has the biggest number of tourists in the state. In addition to being an important port of trade in the New Spain, is currently one of the earliest and most important ports in Mexico as a scale for shipping and intersection of lines running between Panama and San Francisco. Acapulco became his world famous in 1950, being visited mainly by Hollywood stars, now Acapulco is still famous for its nightlife and still attracts many vacationers, although most are national, becoming one of Mexico tourist destinations most important along with Cancun and Mexico City.

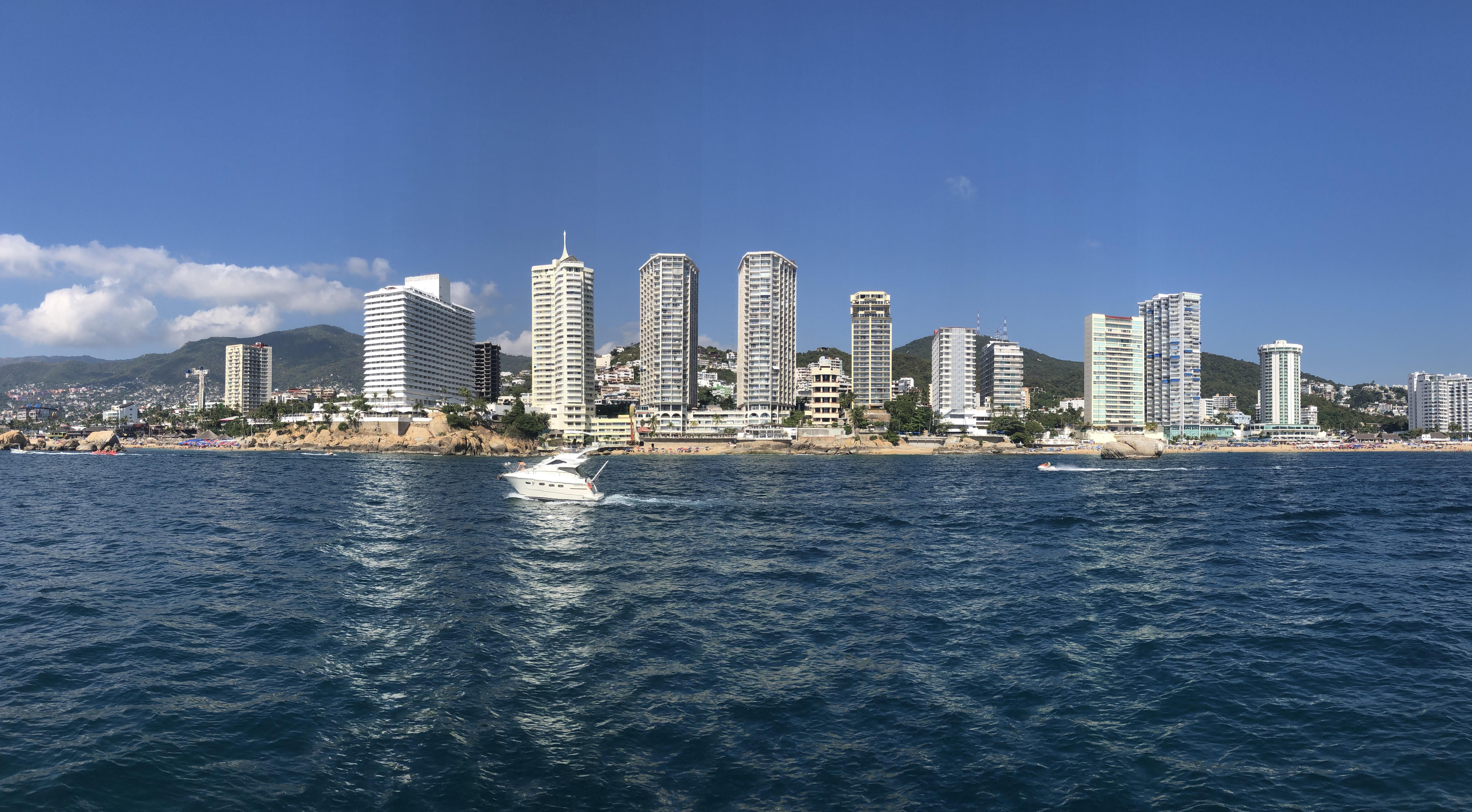
Acapulco

== Ixtapa ==
Ixtapa is a beach resort offers a variety of hotels, there are over 5,000 hotel rooms available for tourists in Ixtapa. This resort is a tourist development planned by the government that included a hotel zone, shopping areas and new housing areas especially to attract international tourists.

The term Ixtapa-Zihuatanejo does not refer to one city, but in reality is named for Ixtapa's proximity to the municipal seat of Zihuatanejo. Marina Ixtapa with a 2 square km area consists of sailing facilities with capacity for 621 yachts mooring, private villas, restaurants, shops, a beach club and a tennis center, and a golf course with 18 holes, crossed by canals, was designed by Robert Von Hagge. In 1976, he built the international airport, located just 10 minutes from the city by the National Zihuatanejo-Acapulco highway that serves the cities of Ixtapa. To Zihuatanejo and Ixtapa and Zihuatanejo travel between there are numerous options, from collective to taxis. There is a regular service between the two cities minibuses every half-hour to 23 hours.

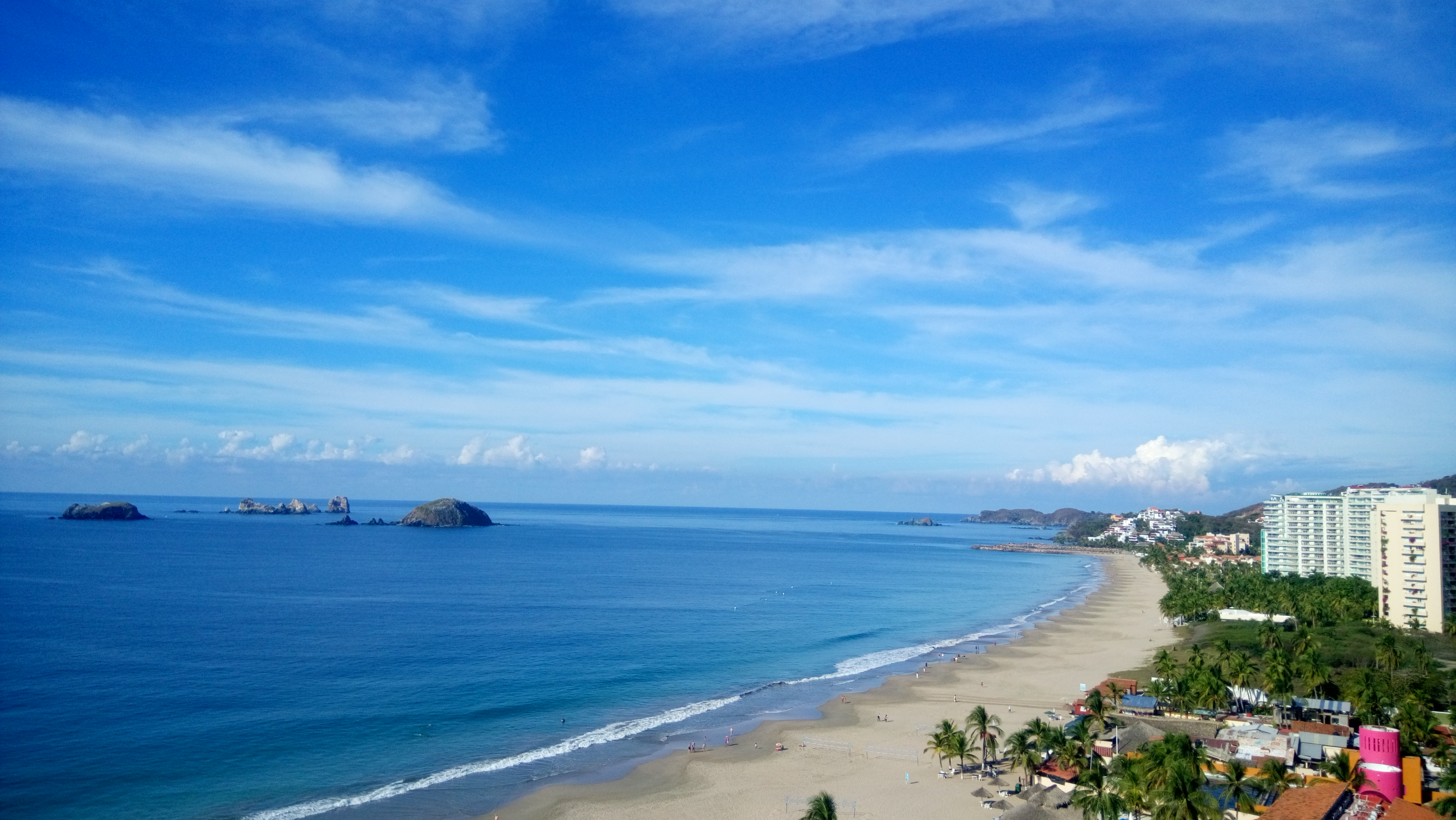
Ixtapa

== Taxco ==
Unlike Acapulco and Zihuatanejo, Taxco is a colonial city and is the oldest mining center of the continent so the Ministry of Tourism has been named as People Luzy Magic City. The Grutas de Cacahuamilpa National Park have been one of the attractions of this city visited, as well as museums, Panoramic Christ, Churches, Temples, among others. Taxco is the oldest mining center of the continent, why is known for its silver mines, which have existed since colonial times, so its Traditional silver worked is world-renowned. Taxco is the oldest mining center of the continent, why is known for its silver mines, which have existed since the viceroyalty. Since 1800, the population began to extract silver Taxco, which is not much by the melting of the mine and a lot of loose oil extraction of silver. The city of Taxco still retains much of its colonial style.

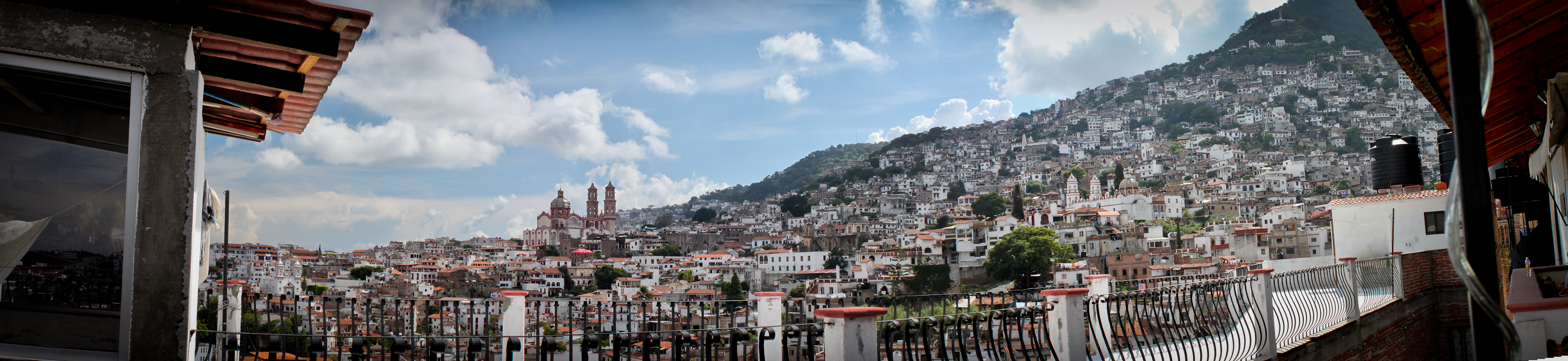
Taxco

== Zihuatanejo ==
Zihuatanejo is a small historic fishing port in the state of Guerrero near Ixtapa, which has had a huge growth in population and economic activity through tourism. The wide variety of beaches, the hospitality of its people and its rich gastronomic Zihuatanejo make major beach resorts in Mexico. It extends around the Bay of Zihuatanejo and inland toward the mountains of the Sierra Madre del Sur. The city is the seat of government of the municipality and the principal community in the region. Since 1970, has been developed in close collaboration with Ixtapa, but conserving its traditional Mexican flare. The city center is located at the northern end of the bay. The center still has its narrow streets paved with stones or bricks. The city also has a long-standing community of Swiss and Italian immigrants.

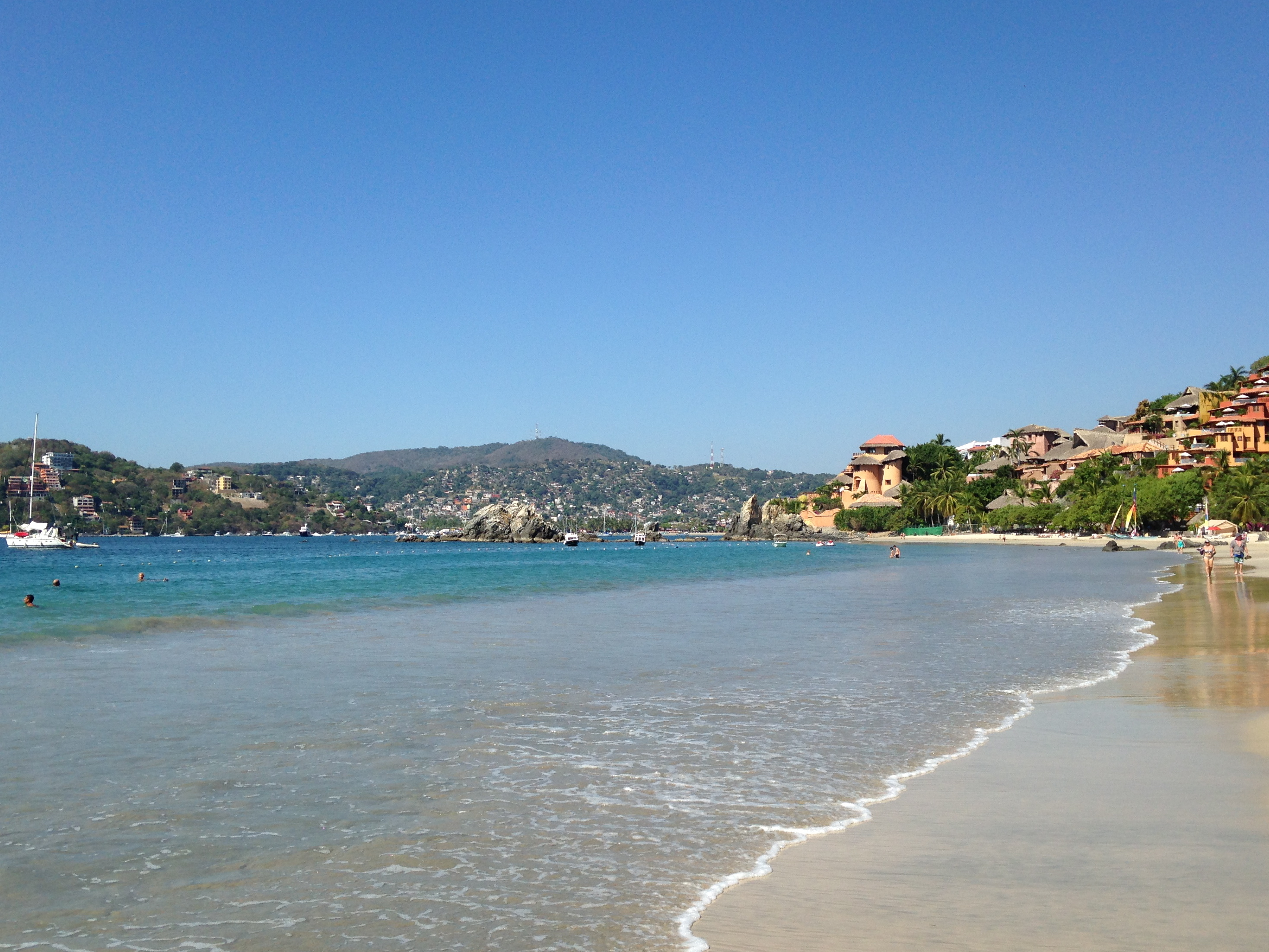
Zihuatanejo

== Hotel activity ==
Destination	Occupied rooms		Available rooms		Hotel occupation	
Destination	2019	18-19	2019	18-19	2019	18-19
Acapulco	9,178		18,806		48.8	
Ixtapa–Zihuatanejo	3,618		6,282		57.6	
Taxco	353		894		39.5	
Triangle of the Sun	13,149		25,982		50.6	

== Means of transport ==
To reach this tourist area there are different means of transport such as:

- Acapulco International Airport
- Ixtapa-Zihuatanejo International Airport
- Mexican Federal Highway 95
- Autopista del Sol

== See also ==
- Baja California
- Riviera Nayarit
- Riviera Maya
