= Pie de la Cuesta Air Force Base =

Mexican Air Force Base in Acapulco, Guerrero, Mexico

Pie de la Cuesta Air Force Base Base Aérea Militar No. 7 Pie de la Cuesta
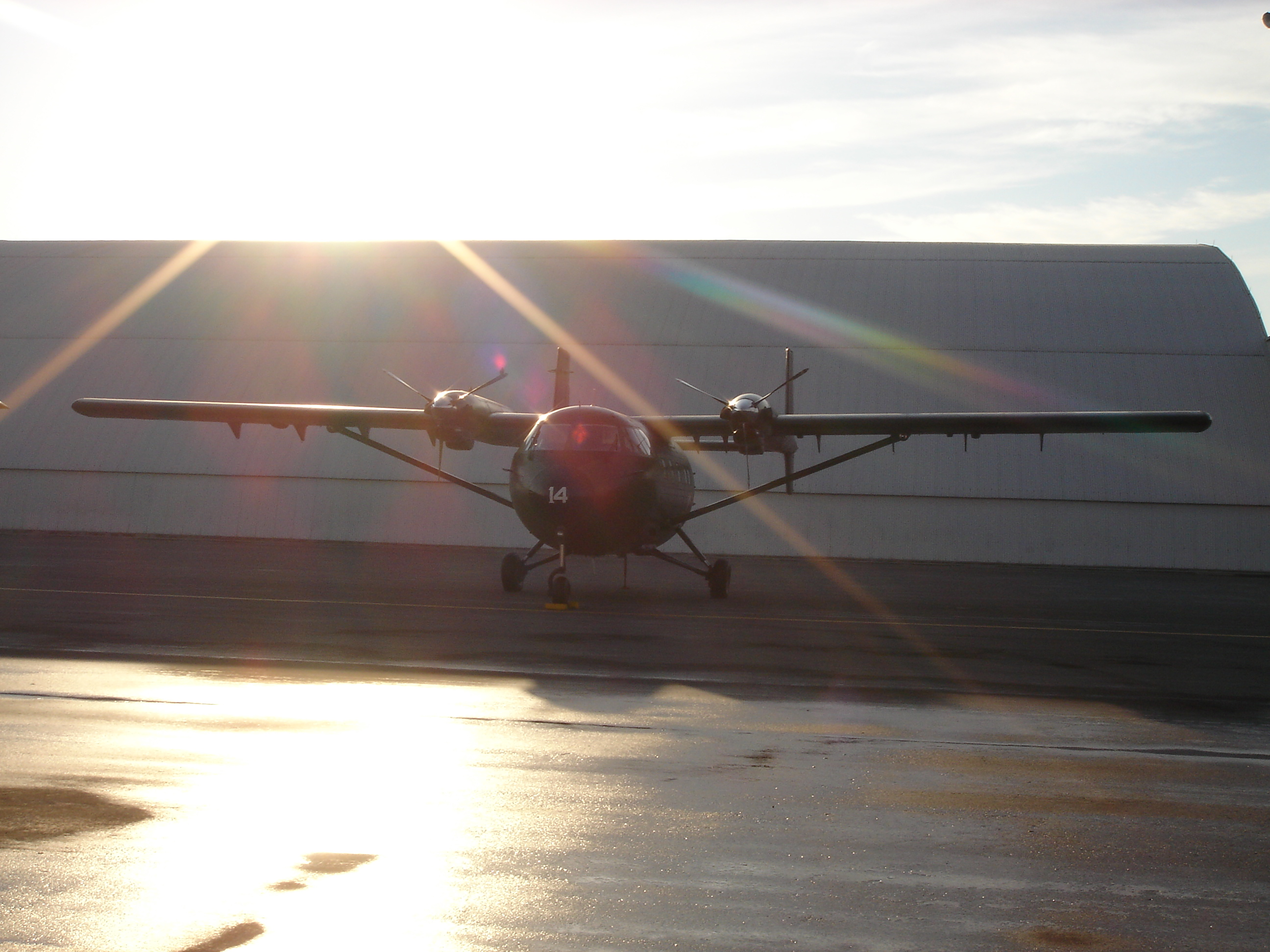
- IATA: none; ICAO: MM41

Summary
- Airport type: Military
- Owner/Operator: Mexican Air Force
- Location: Acapulco, Guerrero, Mexico
- Built: 1945
- Commander: General de Grupo Piloto Aviador Diplomado de Estado Mayor Aéreo Pedro Velázquez Rodríguez
- Time zone: CST (UTC−06:00)
- Elevation AMSL: 20 ft / 6 m
- Coordinates: 16°54′37″N 99°59′19″W
- Website: www.gob.mx/sedena

Map
- Location of the airport in Guerrero MM41 (Mexico)

Runways
Direction	Length		Surface
Direction	ft	m	Surface
10-28	7,611	2,320	Asphalt
- SEDENA

Pie de la Cuesta Air Force Base (Spanish: Estación Aeronaval de Salina Cruz; B.A.M. 7), officially Base Aérea Militar No. 7 General de División Gustavo G. León González, Pie de la Cuesta (Air Force Base No. 7 Major General Gustavo G. León González) (ICAO: MM41), is a military airport located in Acapulco, Guerrero, Mexico. The airport takes its name from Pie de la Cuesta, a beach neighborhood situated in the Acapulco Metropolitan Area where the airport is located.

== History ==
In 1945, the airport was inaugurated as the civil airport serving Acapulco, a well-established coastal tourist destination in Mexico. During the 1940s to the 1970s, Acapulco became the preferred destination for the Jetset, Hollywood celebrities, and affluent individuals seeking exclusive beach vacations in an exotic setting. As the popularity of Acapulco soared, the decision was made to construct a new airport. On April 23, 1953, Acapulco International Airport was inaugurated, and the management of Pie de la Cuesta Airport was transferred to the Mexican Air Force.

During the period known as the Mexican Dirty War, or state terrorism, in Mexico, the base served as a clandestine detention center. Illegal arrests, detentions, torture, interrogations, and the infamous "death flights" occurred here, involving the dropping of murdered and dying individuals from military planes into the Pacific Ocean. Military personnel accused of operating this method include Mario Arturo Acosta Chaparro, Alfredo Mendiola, Alberto Aguirre, and Humberto Rodríguez Acosta. Testimony suggests that teacher and guerrilla member Alicia de los Ríos Merino was last seen alive at this site.

== Facilities ==
The Air Force Station is situated at an elevation of 6 metres (20 ft) above sea level, it features one asphalt-surfaced runway, designated 10/28, measuring 2,320 metres (7,612 ft), and an apron measuring 14,153 square metres (152,342 sq ft) with parking positions for narrow-body aircraft and helipads. Adjacent facilities include 3 hangars, a control tower, and additional structures to house Air Force personnel.

The airport is used by 204th Fighter Air Squad, that operates Pilatus PC-7 aircraft. Also is used by the 102nd Air Squad, that operates Bell 206 and Bell 212 aircraft.

== See also ==
- List of airports in Mexico
- List of airports by ICAO code: M
- List of Mexican military installations
- Mexican Air Force
- Acapulco International Airport
