= Outdoor recreation =

Recreation engaged in out of doors

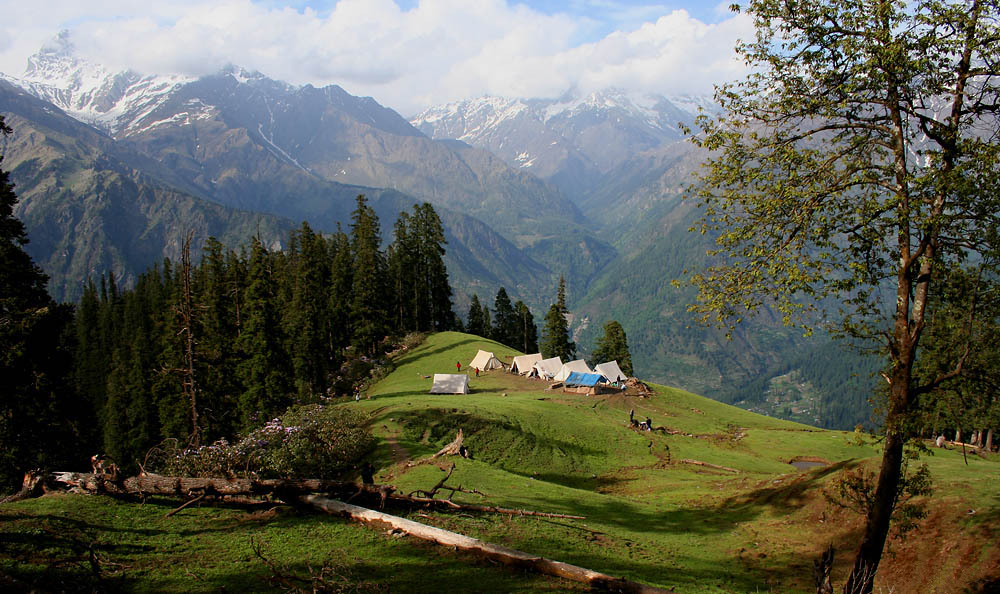
Camping in the Kullu District of Himachal Pradesh, India

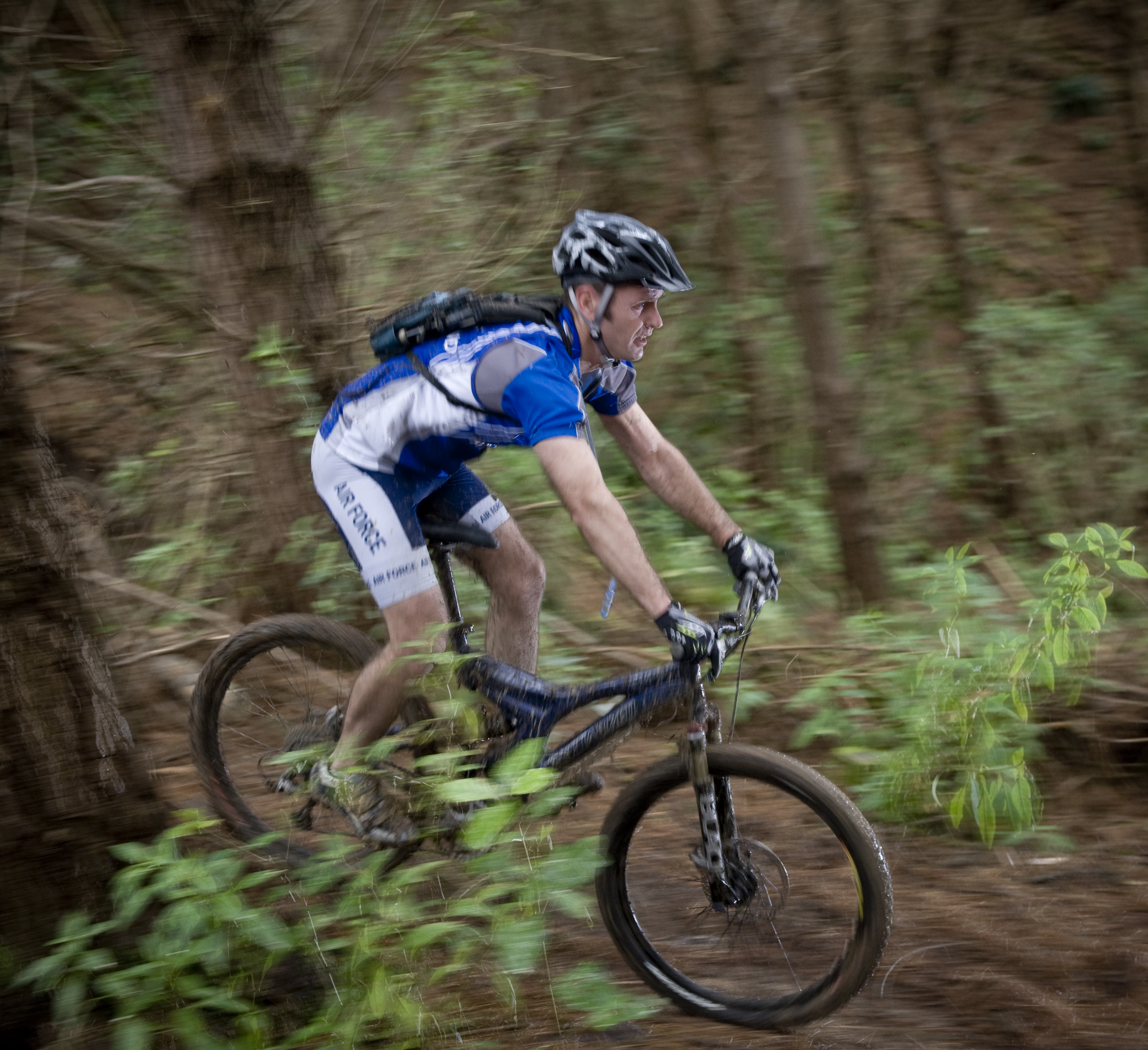
Mountain biker in Levin, New Zealand

Outdoor recreation or outdoor activity refers to recreation done outside, most commonly in natural settings. The activities that encompass outdoor recreation vary depending on the physical environment they are being carried out in. These activities can include fishing, hunting, backpacking, walking and horseback riding — and can be completed individually or collectively. Outdoor recreation is a broad concept that encompasses a varying range of activities and landscapes.

Outdoor recreation is typically pursued for purposes of physical exercise, general wellbeing, and spiritual renewal. While a wide variety of outdoor recreational activities can be classified as sports, they do not all demand that a participant be an athlete. Rather, it is the collectivist idea that is at the fore in outdoor recreation, as outdoor recreation does not necessarily encompass the same degree of competitiveness or rivalry that is embodied in sporting matches or championships. Competition generally is less stressed than in organized individual or team sports. (Note: The term "outdoor recreation" may also refer to a team sport game or practice held in an outdoor setting, such as an under-12 flag football league, often organized by a municipality or camp, but this is merely a case of shared nomenclature.) When the activity involves exceptional excitement, physical challenge, or risk, it is sometimes referred to as "adventure recreation" or "adventure training", rather than an extreme sport.

Other traditional examples of outdoor recreational activities include hiking, camping, mountaineering, cycling, dog walking, canoeing, caving, kayaking, rafting, rock climbing, running, sailing, skiing, sky diving and surfing. As new pursuits, often hybrids of prior ones, emerge, they gain their own identities, such as coasteering, canyoning, river trekking, fastpacking, and plogging.

== Purpose and economic impact ==
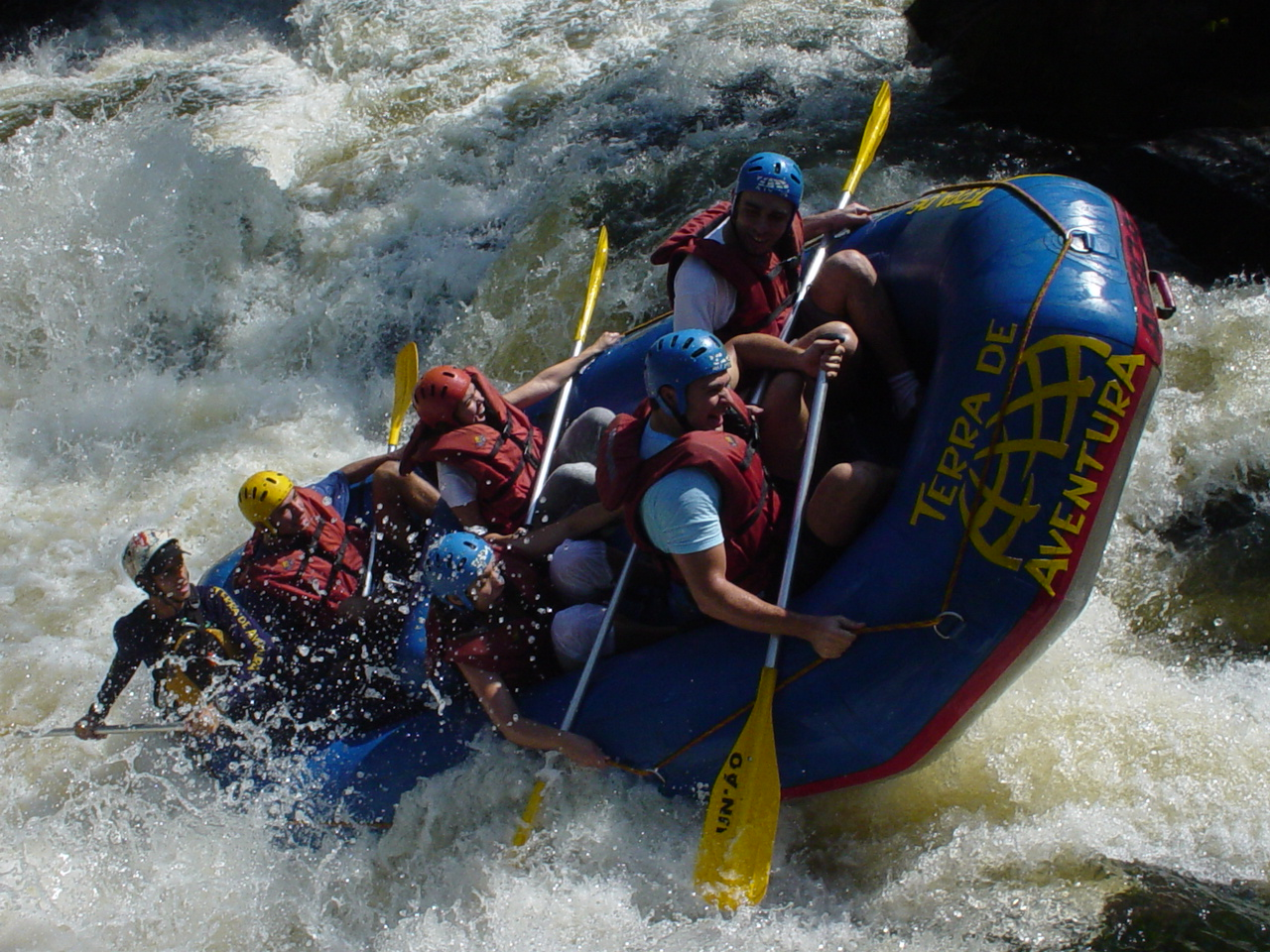
Whitewater rafting

Outdoor recreation involves any kind of activity within an outdoor environment. Outdoor recreation can include established sports, and individuals can participate without association with teams, competitions or clubs. Activities include backpacking, canoeing, canyoning, caving, climbing, hiking, hill walking, hunting, kayaking, and rafting. Broader groupings include water sports, snow sports, and horseback riding.

People engage in physical activity outdoors as a form of recreation. Various physical activities can be completed individually or communally. Sports which are mainly played indoors or other settings such as fields are able to transition to an outdoor setting for recreational and non-competitive purposes. Outdoor physical activities can help people learn new skills, test stamina and endurance, and participate in social activities.

Outdoor activities are also frequently used as a setting for education and team building.

According to the U.S. Bureau of Economic Analysis, outdoor recreation accounted for $696.7 billion in current-dollar value added, or 2.4 percent of U.S. gross domestic product (GDP), in 2024. Inflation-adjusted GDP for the outdoor recreation economy grew 2.7 percent that year, compared with 2.8 percent for the overall U.S. economy.

== Setting ==
Outdoor recreation often occurs in sparsely populated areas with mountains, lakes, rivers, scenic views, and rugged terrain. In the United States, state parks and national parks offer campgrounds and opportunities for outdoor recreation. In the UK, all of rural Scotland and all those areas of England and Wales designated as "right to roam" areas are available for outdoor recreation on foot. Some areas are also open to mountain bikers and to horse riders.

In many cities, recreational areas for various outdoor activities are created for the population. These include natural parks, parks, playgrounds, sports facilities but also areas with free sea access such as the beach area of Venice Beach in California, the Promenade des Anglais in Nice or the waterfront of Barcola in Trieste.

== List of activities ==
- Abseiling
- Adventure park
- Adventure travel
- Airsoft
- All-terrain vehicle riding
- Amusement park
- Angling
- Archery
- Aviation
- Backpacking
- BASE jumping
- Benchmarking (geolocating)
- Birdwatching
- Bungee jumping
- Bushcraft
- Camping
- Canoeing
- Canyoning
- Caving
- Clam digging
- Clay pigeon shooting
- Cliff jumping
- Coasteering
- Cold-weather biking
- Corn maze
- Cross country running
- Cross-country skiing
- Cycling
- Dog park
- Driving
- Extreme sport
- Falconry
- Field archery
- Fitness trail
- Fly fishing
- Freerunning
- Gardening
- Geocaching
- Gliding
- Grilling
- Hang gliding
- Hiking
- Horseback riding
- Hot air ballooning
- Hunting
- Historical reenactment
- Ice climbing
- Ice fishing
- Ice skating
- Jetskiing
- Kayaking
- Kicksledding
- Letterboxing
- Metal detecting
- Mountain biking
- Mountain climbing
- Mountaineering
- Mushroom hunting
- Nordic walking
- Off-roading
- Overlanding
- Orienteering
- Outdoor fitness
- Outdoor gym
- Paragliding
- Parasailing
- Parkour
- Outdoor party
- Photography
- Picnic
- Plogging
- Paramotoring
- Rafting
- Rappelling
- River trekking
- Rock climbing
- Running
- Safari park
- Safari
- Sandboarding
- Scuba diving
- Seatrekking
- Sightseeing
- Skateboarding
- Skiing
- Slacklining
- Sport fishing
- Skydiving
- Shooting
- Skyrunning
- Sledding
- Snorkeling
- Snowboarding
- Snowmobiling
- Snowshoeing
- Standup paddleboarding
- Sunbathing
- Surfing
- Swimming
- Tourism
- Trail running
- Tree climbing
- Trekking
- Urban exploration
- Water sports
- Waterskiing
- Windsurfing
- Wingsuit flying
- Winter swimming
- Zip line

== Examples ==
=== Trekking ===
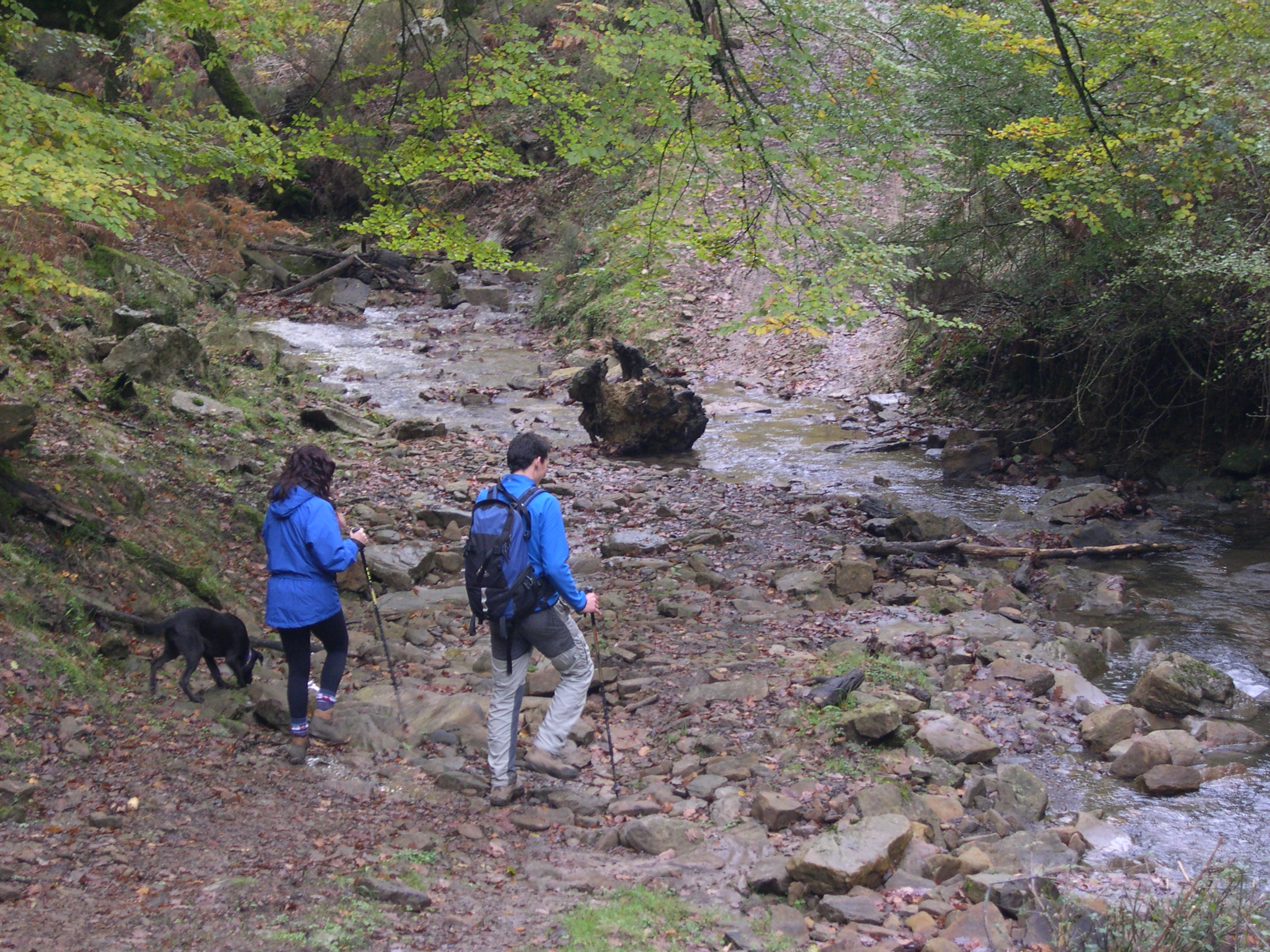
Trekkers in Gorbea park, south of Biscay in Basque Country, Spain

Trekking can be understood as an extended walk and involves day hikes, overnight or extended hikes. An example of a day trek is hiking during the day and returning at night to a lodge for a hot meal and a comfortable bed. Physical preparation for trekking includes cycling, swimming, jogging and long walks. Trekking requires experience with basic survival skills, first aid, and orienteering when going for extended hikes or staying out overnight.

=== Mountain biking ===
The activity of mountain biking involves steering a mountain cycle over rocky tracks and around boulder-strewn paths. Mountain bikes or ATBs (all-terrain bikes) feature a rugged frame and fork. Their frames are often built of aluminum so they are lightweight and stiff, making them efficient to ride.

Many styles of mountain biking are practiced, including all mountain, downhill, trials, dirt jumping, trail riding, and cross country. The latter two are the most common.

Balance, core strength, and endurance are all physical traits that are required to go mountain biking. Riders also need bike handling skills and the ability to make basic repairs to their bikes. More advanced mountain biking involves technical descents such as down hilling and free riding.

=== Canyoning ===
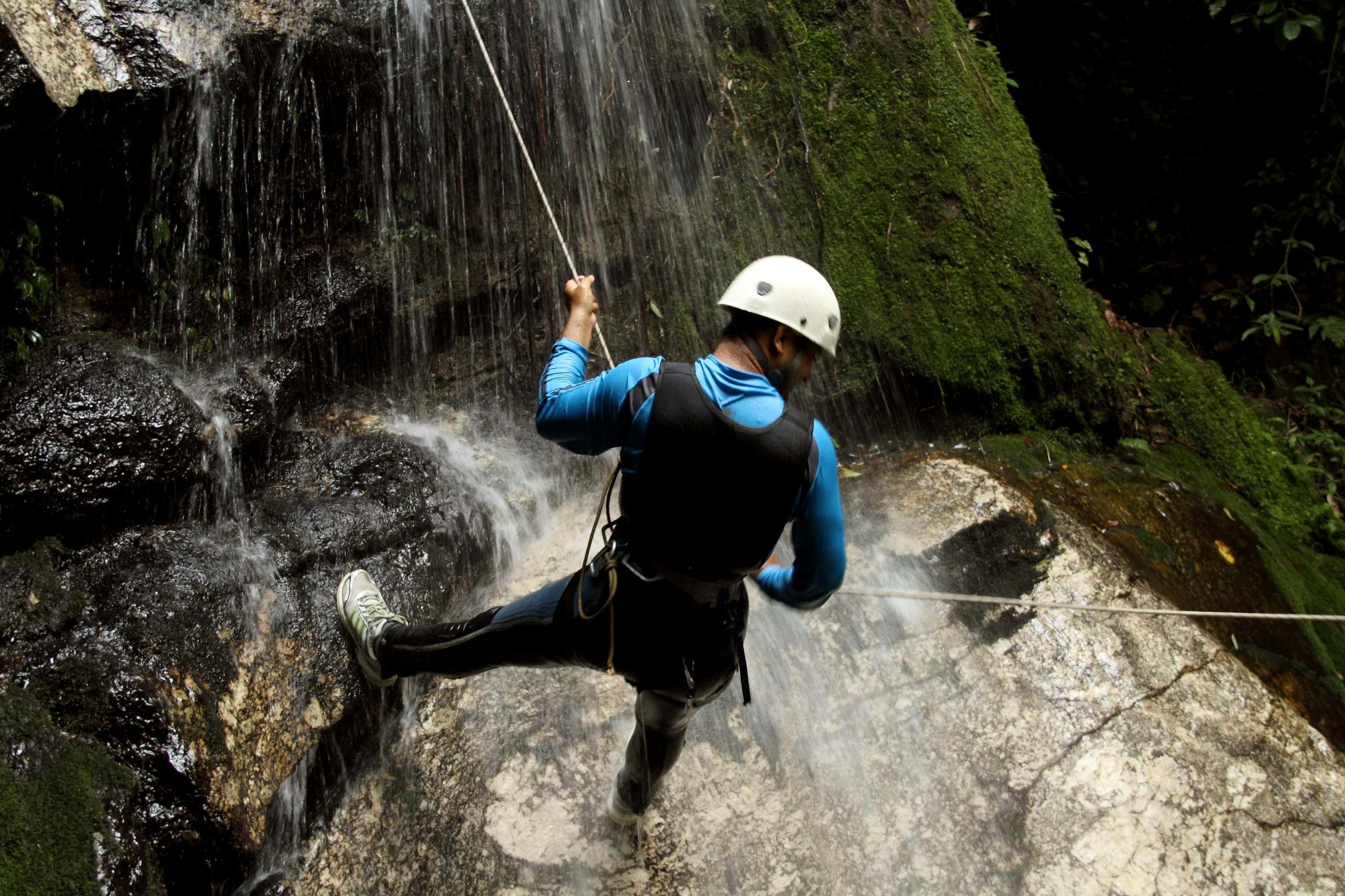
Canyoning at Sundarijal, Kathmandu, Nepal

Canyoning is an activity which involves climbing, descending, jumping and trekking through canyons. The sport originates from caving and involves both caving and climbing techniques. Canyoning often includes descents that involve rope work, down-climbing, or jumps that are technical in nature. Canyoning is frequently done in remote and rugged settings and often requires navigational, route-finding and other wilderness skills.

== Education ==
=== Outdoor education in the United States ===
Education is also a popular focus of outdoor activity. University outdoor recreation programs are becoming more popular in the United States. Studies have shown that outdoor recreation programs can be beneficial to a student's well-being and stress levels in terms of calming and soothing the mind. Universities in the United States often offer indoor rock climbing walls, equipment rental, ropes courses and trip programming. A few universities give degrees in adventure recreation, which aims to teach graduates how to run businesses in the field of adventure recreation.

=== Outdoor education in the United Kingdom ===
In the UK, the house of commons' Education and Skills Committee supports outdoor education. The committee encourages fieldwork projects since it helps in the development of ‘soft’ skills and social skills, particularly in hard to reach children. These activities can also take place on school trips, on visits in the local community or even on the school grounds.

== Outdoor enthusiast ==
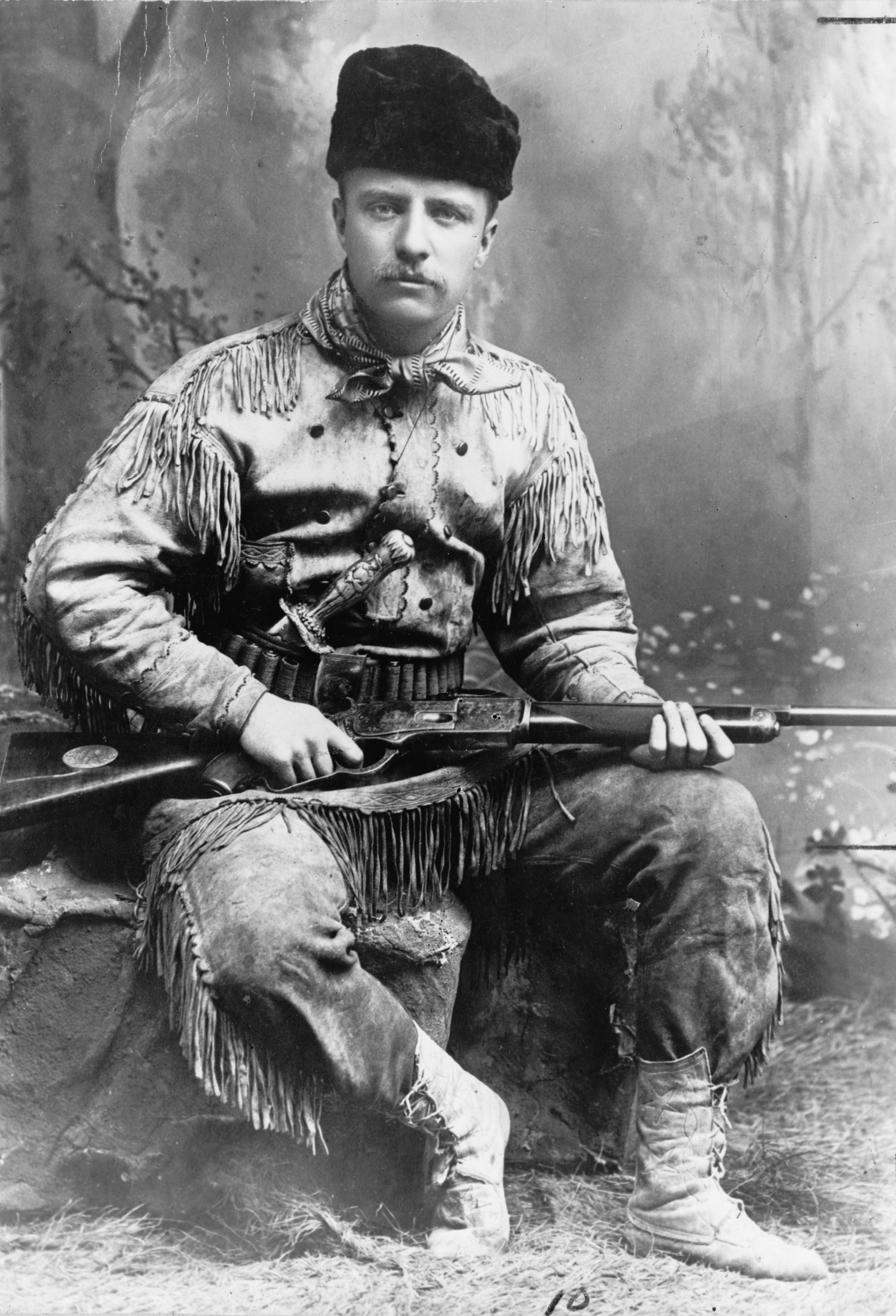
Theodore Roosevelt was a noted outdoorsman, conservationist, and big-game hunter

Outdoor enthusiast and outdoorsy are terms for a person who enjoys outdoor recreation. The terms outdoorsman, sportsman, woodsman, or bushman have also been used to describe someone with an affinity for the outdoors.

Some famous outdoor enthusiasts include:

- Teddy Roosevelt
- Robert Baden-Powell
- Ernest Hemingway
- Ray Mears
- Bear Grylls
- Doug Peacock
- Richard Wiese
- Earl Shaffer
- Jo Gjende
- Saxton Pope
- Randy Stoltmann
- Christopher Camuto
- Eva Shockey
- Jim Shockey
- Henry Pittock
- Eddie Bauer
- Gaylord DuBois
- Euell Gibbons
- Clay Perry
- Arthur Hasketh Groom
- Les Hiddins
- Bill Jordan
- Corey Ford

Some pioneering female outdoor enthusiasts include:

- Mary Seacole
- Isabella Bird
- Emma Rowena Gatewood
- Claire Marie Hodges
- Mina Benson Hubbard
- Beryl Markham
- Freya Stark
- Margaret Murie
- Celia Hunter
- Rachel Carson
- Terry Tempest Williams
- Marjory Stoneman Douglas
- Arlene Blum

== See also ==
- Adventure travel
- Hazards of outdoor recreation
- Health effects of sunlight exposure
