= Diaphragmatic spasm =

Diaphragmatic spasm can refer to:

- Hiccups (synchronous diaphragmatic spasm or flutter)
- Getting the wind knocked out of you (transient or temporary diaphragmatic spasm)
- Bornholm disease (epidemic transient diaphragmatic spasm)
