= Coasteering =

Navigating along the intertidal zone

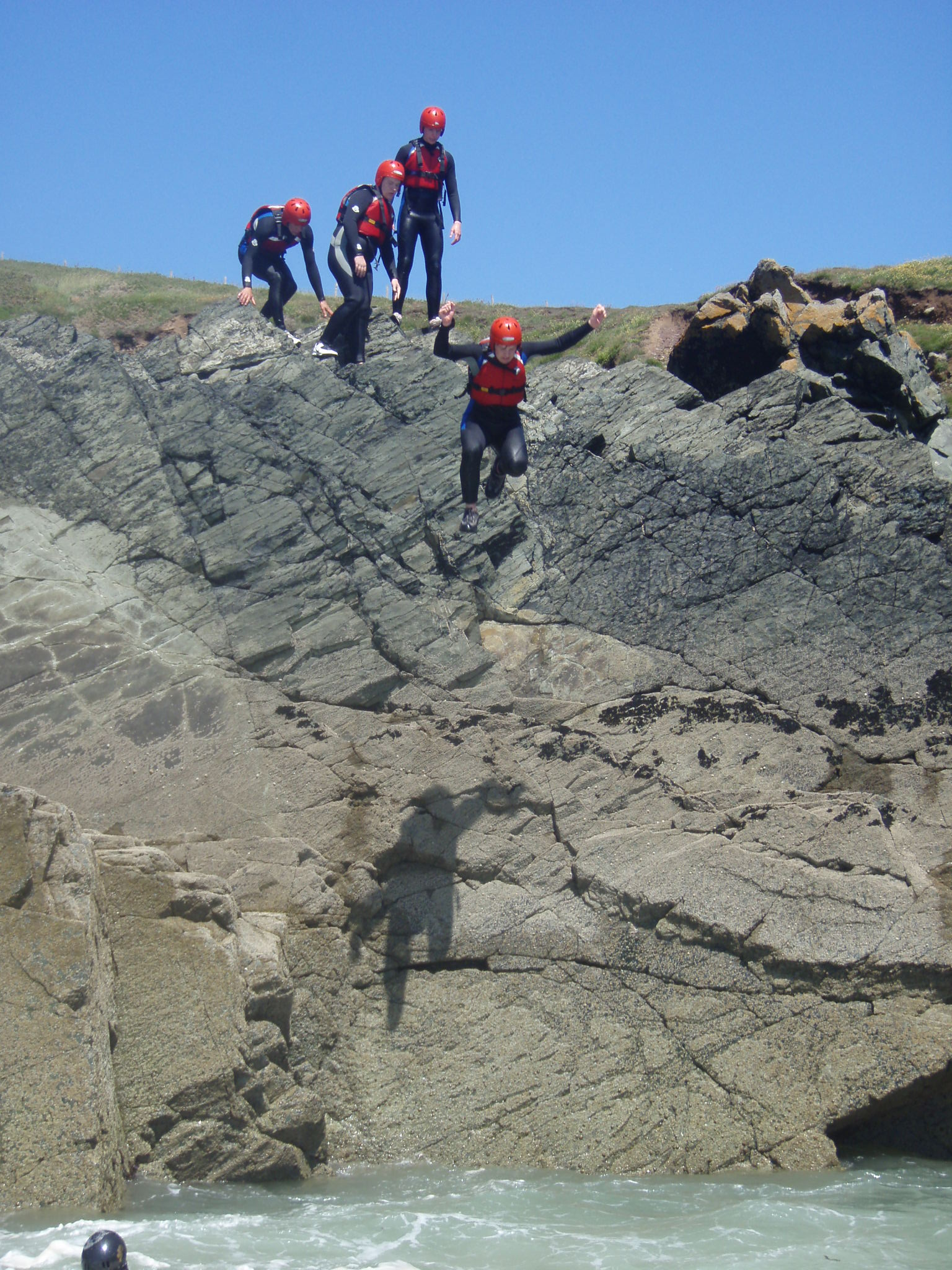
Coasteering near Porthclais, Pembrokeshire

Coasteering is movement along the intertidal zone of a rocky coastline on foot or by swimming, without the aid of boats, surf boards or other craft.

Coasteering allows a person to move in the “impact zone” between a body of water and the coast where waves, tides, wind, rocks, cliffs, gullies, and caves come together.

The term was first used by Edward C Pyatt as the combination of the words "mountaineering" and "coast" and was adopted by Andy Middleton in Wales in 1985, who then made it a business idea.

== History ==
Although all aspects of coasteering have been informally practised by people for a very long time, if only as a means of access to a cut-off cove beyond a headland, the term appears first to have been used in 1973. In the book Sea Cliff Climbing, John Cleare and Robin Collomb said "A few enthusiasts believe that coasteering will become popular and has a big future".

In the late 1980s Andy Middleton of Twr-y-Felin Outdoor Centre developed it as a commercially guided recreational activity initially along the cliff coastline of St.Davids in Pembrokeshire in Wales. By the mid-1990s write-ups started appearing in the travel/recreational pages of the newspapers showing that several commercial companies were offering such activity. The activity then spread to all regions of the UK where there are suitable rocky coasts, including Cornwall, Pembrokeshire, Anglesey and the Highlands and Isles of Scotland.

The advisory organisation for coasteering in the UK is the National Coasteering Charter (NCC). In the UK the activity is recognized by the Adventure Activities Licensing Authority, which is a department of the Health and Safety Executive.

== Activities ==
Coasteering may include all or some of the following activities:

- Swimming or Adventure Swimming: These activities can occur in calm, rough or white water; and/or tidal currents. Dressing for swimming in the sea (wetsuits, buoyancy aids, etc.) is often an integral part of coasteering, even on routes where it is possible to stay dry. A route, or activity, where the group start out with the intention of staying dry – whether through route choice or the use of ropes and harnesses – would not usually be considered as coasteering but sea level traversing, which is usually a dry pursuit.
- Climbing, scrambling: The very nature of the coastline that is needed for coasteering demands aspects of these activities. Ropes, as security on rock, are not used. Any climbing activity usually takes place above deep water, with safety spotters used where appropriate. There is a similarity to the sport of deep-water soloing, but this would normally be carried out by experienced individuals not wearing equipment suitable for coasteering. Coasteering is not usually intended as an 'always dry', climbing activity.
- Jumping into water: Coasteering "...often involves a series of jumps into deep water."

== Guided adventure experience ==
The rocky cliff coasts of western Britain provide the world's principal location for organised guided coasteering, where it is available from over 100 activity centres. Usually half-day or one-day trips are offered at a variety of levels catering for beginners, intermediates and advanced. Some trips are especially slanted towards study of coastal ecology. Some centres cater for parties of schoolchildren.

== Adventure races ==
Coasteering may be included as one of the disciplines for a stage of an adventure race. This is especially common in New Zealand, but is also to be found in Australia, Canada, and the USA.

== Safety ==
In 2015 in the UK a document giving safety advice for coasteering providers was published. Also in the UK, the HSE has an information sheet of good practice for the Adventure Activities Industry.

=== Basic safety equipment ===
Safety equipment reflects the environment in which the sport is performed and often includes:

- Wetsuit (for cooler waters outside the tropics)
- Protective clothing and gloves to prevent abrasions – may be provided by the wetsuit
- Buoyancy aid
- Helmet
- Shoes to provide grip on rocks
- Wetsuit boots, trainers or canyoning boots (closed toes)
- Throw line
- Communications – hand-held VHF and/or mobile telephone
- Knife

== Hazards ==
When jumping into water from height, water resistance increases with the speed of entry, so entering the water at high-velocity induces rapid and potentially dangerous decelleration. Jumping from a height of 20 feet (6.1 m) results in a person hitting the water at 25 mph (40 km/h). Impacting with the water surface at this velocity is capable of giving a person temporary paralysis of the diaphragm, a compressed spine, broken bones, or concussion.

When diving and flipping into water along the intertidal zone there is an increased risk of receiving an injury including a spinal injury.

Height falling from	Speed reached at water surface
5 feet (1.5 metres)	12 mph (19 km/h)
10 feet (3 metres)	17 mph (27 km/h)
20 feet (6.1 metres)	25 mph (40 km/h)
50 feet (15 metres)	38 mph (61 km/h)
85 feet (26 metres)	53 to 62 mph (85 to 100 km/h)

=== List of hazards ===
- Being swept away by currents
- Clothing or feet being caught in rocks or objects underneath the water surface
- Cold water shock
- Drowning
- Hypothermia
- Jumping from height and impacting with water surface
- Jumping from height and impacting with submerged objects "...like rocks, fishing gear, mooring lines and other under water hazards [that] may not be visible"
- Jumping from height and impacting with rocks above the water surface

== Places known for coasteering ==
- Hong Kong
- Wales
- England
- Scotland
- Madeira
- Athens
- Goa
- New Zealand
- Big Sur, California, USA

== See also ==
- Bouldering
- Caving
- Outdoor activity
- Rock fishing
- Scrambling
- Seatrekking
- Cliff jumping
