= Seatrekking =

Seatrekking is a sport that consists in exploring the shorelines of oceans, seas, bays, lakes or rivers both above and below the water over the course of several days, without the aid of a boat or a watercraft. Seatrekking involves swimming, snorkeling, freediving and hiking, and combines all these disciplines into a distinctive form of sport and outdoor experience. Unlike coasteering, seatrekking includes overnight camping and involves trips of longer distances.

== Ethics ==
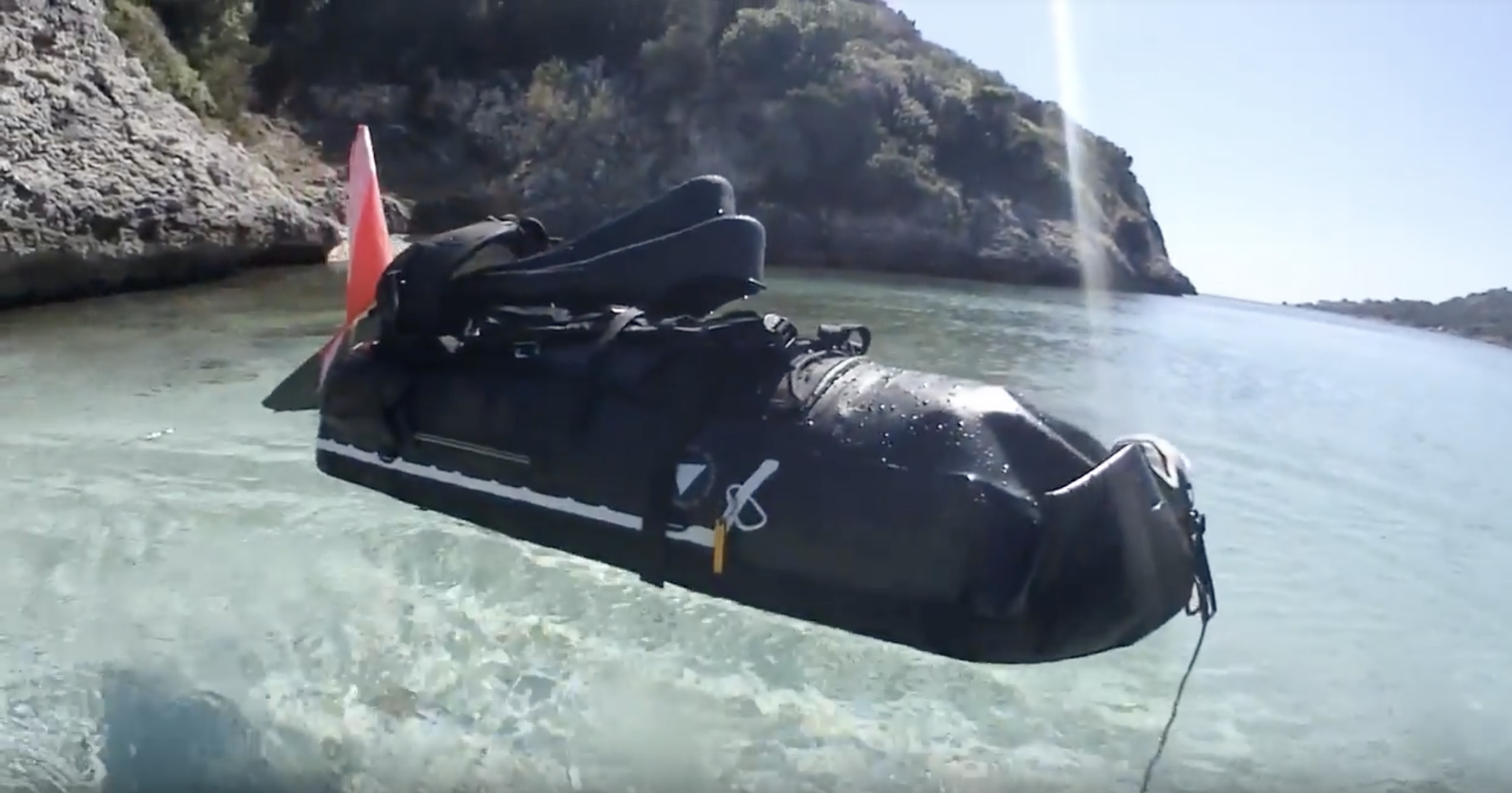
Waterproof inflatable bag

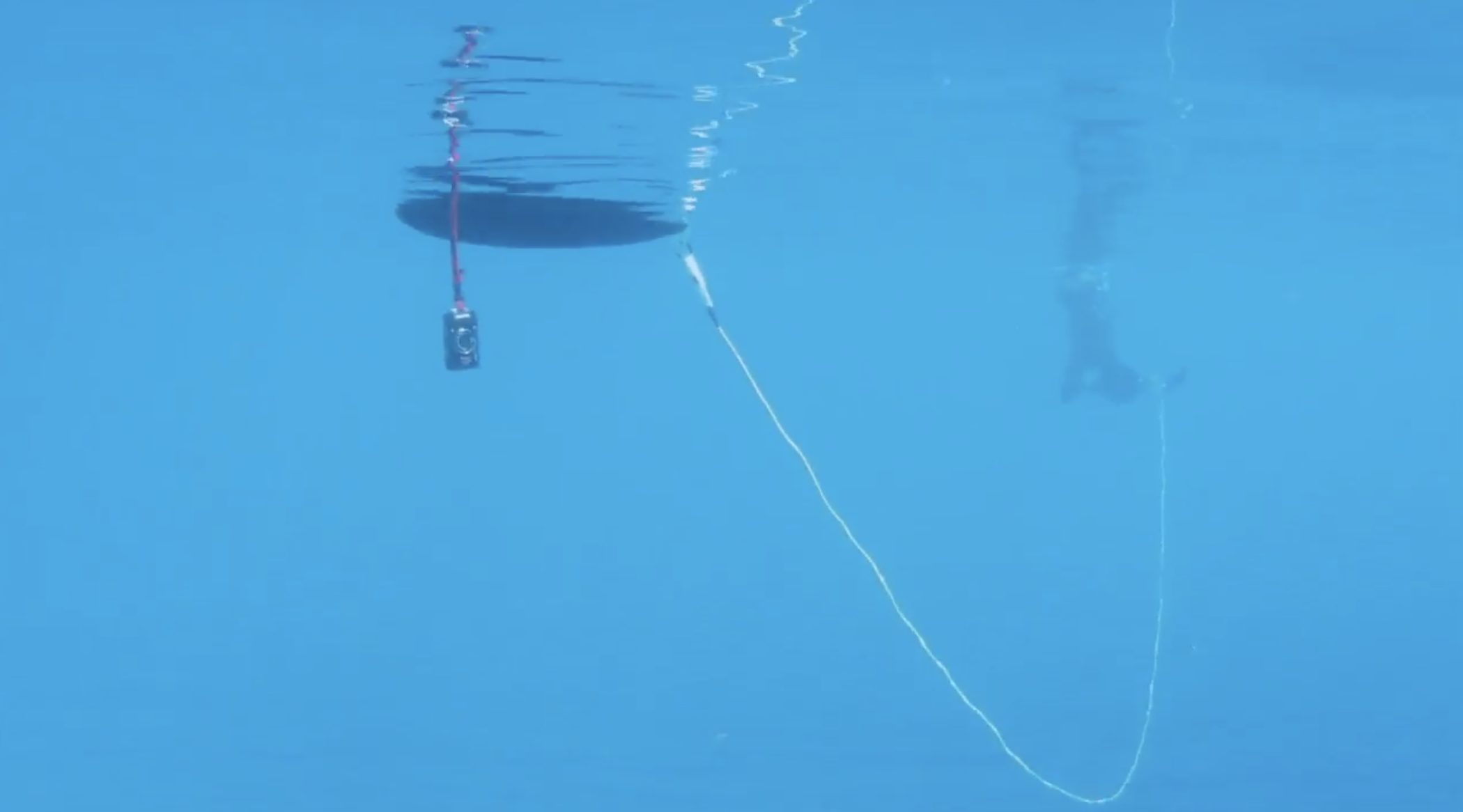
Waterproof inflatable bag attached to seatrekker using a leash

Seatrekking adheres to the Leave No Trace principles. Additionally the sport is specifically committed to the conservation of natural environments along the coastline by travelling in small groups to minimize the impact on the environment and the disturbance on wildlife, and by complying with any local regulations and obtaining any necessary authorizations.

== Hazards ==
Seatrekking can be dangerous, and is a physically demanding activity due to its engagement with the sea and open bodies of water.

Seatrekking "...often involves a series of jumps into deep water.". Jumping from a height of 20 feet (6.1 m) results in a person hitting the water at 25 mph (40 km/h). Impacting with the water surface at this velocity is capable of giving a person temporary paralysis of the diaphragm, a compressed spine, broken bones, or concussion.

In the United Kingdom between 2005 and 2015 there were 83 people injured and 20 people who died whilst jumping from height into water.

When diving and flipping into water along the intertidal zone there is an increased risk of receiving an injury including a spinal injury

=== List of hazards ===
- Being swept away by strong currents
- Cold Water Shock
- Clothing or feet being caught in rocks or objects underneath the water surface
- Drowning
- Hypothermia
- Impact with rocks
- Impact with water surface
- Submerged objects "...like rocks, fishing gear, mooring lines and other under water hazards [that] may not be visible"

Height falling from	Velocity reached at water surface
5 feet (1.5 metres)	12 mph (19 kmh)
10 feet (3 metres)	17 mph (27 kmh)
20 feet (6 metres)	25 mph (40 kmh)
50 feet (15 metres)	38 mph (61 kmh)
85 feet (26 metres)	53 to 62 mph (85 to 100 kmh)

== Safety ==
A good physical condition, swimming proficiency, knowledge of outdoor safety, self-rescue and usage of adequate equipment are important to practicing seatrekking safely. Recommended safety equipment may include a wetsuit, personal locator beacon, hand-held VHF radio and/or mobile telephone, dive flag, throw line and a whistle. Weather and ocean patterns and forecast require particular attention. It is crucial for personal safety to keep up-to-date with local conditions regarding tide, swell, wind, ocean currents, rip currents as well as the weather.

== Equipment ==
Seatrekking requires the use of a waterproof bag; this contains all equipment and food, and is dragged in the water using a rope or leash. Hydrodynamic properties of the bag are essential to reduce drag. It also acts as a supplementary safety flotation device in the water, especially when the bag can be inflated and maintain internal pressure. On land, the bag is carried as a normal backpack along hiking sections.

At sea, other equipment consists of common items used for swimming, snorkeling or freediving, such as mask and snorkel, fins, and optionally a wetsuit depending on water temperature. On land, essentials are hiking clothes and shoes, as well as bivouacking equipment. Additional equipment is selected for its lightness, fast drying time and suitability for prolonged use in a marine environment.

== See also ==
- Bouldering
- Caving
- Coasteering
- Long-distance swimming
- Open-water swimming
- Scrambling
- Rock fishing
- Tombstoning
