= The Sinks =

Waterfall in Tennessee, United States

Coordinates: 35°40′9″N 83°39′44″W

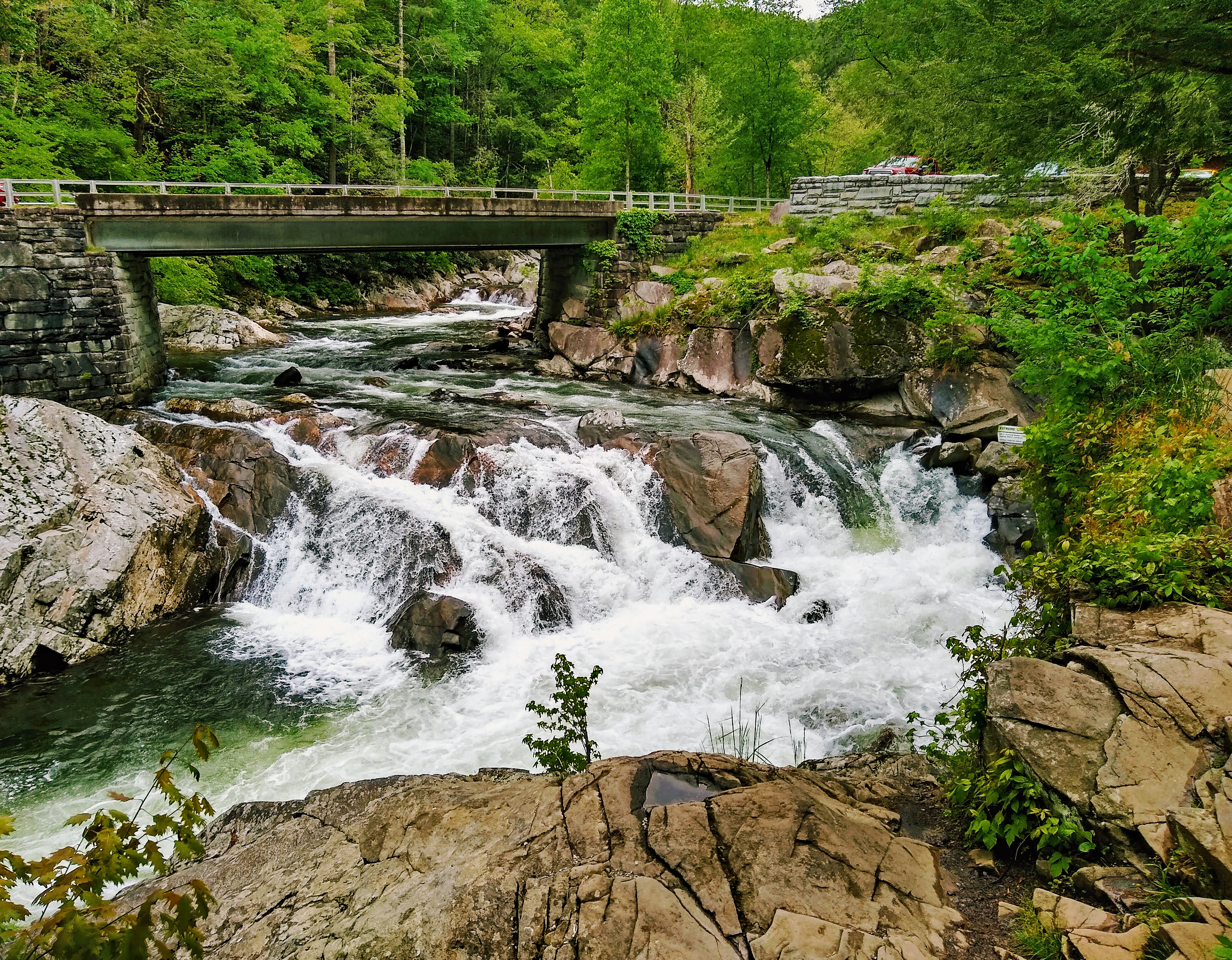
The Sinks, Great Smoky Mountain N.P., Tennessee

The Sinks is an unnatural waterfall on the Little River, in the Great Smoky Mountains National Park in Tennessee, United States. The Sinks is the most visited waterfall in the park due to the ease of access.

It was created when loggers dynamited the river, due to a huge log jam. A popular swimming spot on hot summer days, there have been multiple drownings and many serious injuries.

Rangers from the Great Smoky Mountains National Park recovered the body of a 61-year-old man who was kayaking above the Sinks on December 17, 2022.

Cliff Jumping is a popular activity at the sinks, as well as family picnics and swimming.
