= Christopher Camuto =

American nature writer, scholar and poet

Christopher Camuto is an American nature writer, scholar and poet. He is the author of three books focused on the southern Appalachians--A Fly Fisherman's Blue Ridge (Henry Holt, 1990), Another Country: Journeying Toward the Cherokee Mountains (Henry Holt, 1997), Hunting from Home: A Year Afield in the Blue Ridge (W. W. Norton, 2003) and of Time and Tide in Acadia: Seasons on Mount Desert Island (W. W. Norton, 2009). He worked under the editorship of William Strachan at Henry Holt and of Amy Cherry at Norton.

His second book, Another Country, is perhaps his most complex, interweaving historical accounts of the southern Appalachians, reflections on the Cherokee language and its relationship to the landscape, and an account of efforts to reintroduce the endangered red wolf into Great Smoky Mountains National Park.

Since 1995 Camuto has been the book review columnist for Gray's Sporting Journal, where he comments six times a year on sporting literature and art. Since 1998 he had written the quarterly "Watersheds" column, which he created, for Trout Unlimited's Trout. He was the book review columnist for Audubon from 1999 to 2002 and has written for a wide range of periodicals devoted to nature and the environment, including American Rivers, Audubon, The Boston Globe, Chesapeake Bay Journal, Field & Stream, Flyfishing, Fly Fisherman, Gray's Sporting Journal, Sewanee Review, Sierra, Sports Afield, Trout, Weber Studies in the Environment, and Wilderness.

Camuto's work has been anthologized in a number of books devoted to distinguished nature writing, including The Gift of Trout (Lyons and Burford, 1996), The Height of Our Mountains: Nature Writing from Virginia's Blue Ridge Mountains and Shenandoah Valley (The Johns Hopkins University Press, 1998), In Praise of Wild Trout (The Lyons Press, 1998), The Woods Stretched for Miles: Contemporary Southern Nature Writing (The University of Georgia Press, 1999), Uncommon Wealth: Essays on Virginia's Wild Places (Falcon Press, 1999), The Greatest Fishing Stories Ever Told (The Lyons Press, 2000), Into the Backing (The Lyons Press, 2001), Elemental South: Earth, Air, Fire and Water (The University of Georgia Press, 2004), Bartram's Living Legacy (Mercer University Press, 2010), and Afield: American Writers on Bird Dogs (Skyhorse Press, 2010). He wrote the introduction for the West Virginia University Press reprint, published in 2011, of Julia Davis' 1945 The Shenandoah, one of the titles in the celebrated Rivers of America series (1937-1974).

In the 1990s, Camuto was instrumental in publicizing the acidification of southern Appalachian headwater streams, most notably in an extended feature in the Winter 1991 Trout: "Dropping Acid in the Southern Appalachians: A Wild Trout Resource at Considerable Risk." During the 1980s and 1990s, he worked, as a writer and activist, on the controversies surrounding management of public forest lands in the southeast, especially the protection, preservation and restoration of coldwater streams and the preservation of roadless areas on national forest land. He is associated with the Southern Nature Project (www.southernnature.org), has done work on behalf of American Rivers, the Izaak Walton League, The Nature Conservancy, the Sierra Club, the Southern Appalachian Forest Coalition, Trout Unlimited, The Wilderness Society, and other environmental organizations. In the 1970s, he worked on behalf of migrant and seasonal farmworkers on the eastern shore of Virginia.

A native New Yorker and a long-time resident of Virginia (the Eastern Shore, Albemarle and Rockbridge counties), Camuto currently lives at Wolftree Farm in Union County, Pennsylvania, a hard-used but biologically diverse 78-acre woodland he acquired in 2005 and which has become an eco-restoration project in progress. Located near the foot of Buffalo Mountain, between state-owned forest land and private farmland, the property is an instructive example of the condition of private woodlands in central Pennsylvania. Despite its name, Wolftree Farm is for the most part re-grown woodland rather than tillable land, its succession toward mature woods having been defeated repeatedly by select (high-grade) logging in past decades. Working on his own, Camuto is striving to mitigate the effects of this logging, inroads of invasive species, and ill-conceived white and red pine plantings from the 1960s. He is trying to encourage a naturally diverse mix of native hardwoods—walnut, oak, hickory, black cherry—along with a healthy understory of native shrubs. Despite its problems, the property is diverse in birdlife (over a hundred species) and wildlife (including black bear, wild turkey, ruffed grouse). Camuto hopes to establish the property as a nature preserve. He has established a modest homestead on land he cleared, including a cedar log house he partly built himself near the abandoned home site of one James Glover (1824-1898), grandson of John Glover, Sr., an eighteenth-century Irish immigrant to America and an early (1772) white settler in what became Hartley Township, Pennsylvania. This homestead and woodland are now the center of Camuto's new work in nonfiction, fiction and poetry, including Works and Days: Notes on a Woodland Farm (nonfiction), A Hunter's Book of Hours (poetry), Sympathy for the Settler (poetry), Amygdala: Stories (fiction) and A Dream of Darwin (prose/poetry).

In recent years, Camuto has also been exploring his ancestral roots in Italy and the Mediterranean world. He is at work on a book of essays about his grandparents' connections to the Italian landscape—in Sicily (Bronte), in Basilicata (Melfi, Potenza, San Costantino Albanese) and Como—and a volume of poetry, Learning to Travel, about travel related to Magna Graecia, pre-Socratic philosophy, and classical Western literature, all of which are strong influences on his life, writing and teaching. He maintains close ties to the relations of his paternal grandmother, Delores Scutari, who live in Potenza, Senise and San Costantino Albanese, one of Basilicata's Arberesche mountain villages. Through his maternal grandmother, Mary Bocchetta Zanini, he is related to Vittore Bocchetta—Italian sculptor, painter, scholar and anti-Fascist resistance fighter in World War II.

== Bibliography ==
- (2007). "Christopher Camuto." Bucknell.edu. Retrieved September 11.
- (2003). "Getting in Touch With Woodland Heritage." The New York Times. September 12.
- Washabaugh, William and Catherine Washabaugh (2000). Deep Trout: Angling in Popular Culture. New York: Berg.
