= Clare Marie Hodges =

Ranger for the National Park Service (1890–1970)

- Born: 1890
- Died: 1970 (aged 79–80)
- Other name: Clare Marie Wolfsen
- Employer(s): Yosemite Valley School and National Park Service
- Spouse: Peter Wolfsen

Clare Marie Hodges (1890–1970) was one of the first paid female rangers for the National Park Service, working at Yosemite National Park.

== Early life ==
Clare Marie Hodges was born in Santa Cruz in 1890. She first visited Yosemite Valley at age 14 on a 4-day horse-riding trip with her family.

Hodges attended and graduated from the San Jose Normal School (now San Jose State University) where she helped contribute to the herbarium. She also was the president of the literary society and authored "Songs of the Trail."

== Career ==
In 1916, Hodges began teaching at the Yosemite Valley School as a grade school teacher.

During the spring of 1918, there was difficulty in finding enough male rangers, due to the World War I draft. With two years of experience working at the Yosemite School and familiarizing herself with the trails in Yosemite, she applied to become a park ranger to Yosemite's superintendent at the time, Washington B. Lewis. Later Hodges recalled that she said, "Probably you'll laugh at me, but I want to be a ranger?" To which Lewis responded, "It's been in my mind for some time to put a woman on one of these patrols — only I couldn't find the right one before."

Her job was mounted patrol through the park and included delivering the park's gate receipts from Tuolumne Meadows to the park headquarters, which required an overnight trip on horseback. She wore a park service badge and Stetson hat and had the same duties as her male colleagues, but refused to carry a gun. She served as a ranger from May 22 to September 7, 1918. Clare Marie Hodges was the only fully commissioned female park ranger for 30 years.

== Personal life ==
Hodges married Peter Wolfsen, a mariposa cattle rancher, and took on his last name. She remained active in the Mariposa community by guiding groups throughout the Yosemite region. She and her husband were both active at Camp Wawona, operated by the Seventh-Day Advent Church. Clare became the camp's first naturalist.

She died in 1970 at age 89. In honor of her and her husband's contributions to the Mariposa community, a nature trail was named in their honor.
