= Cliff jumping =

Plunging from a height for recreation

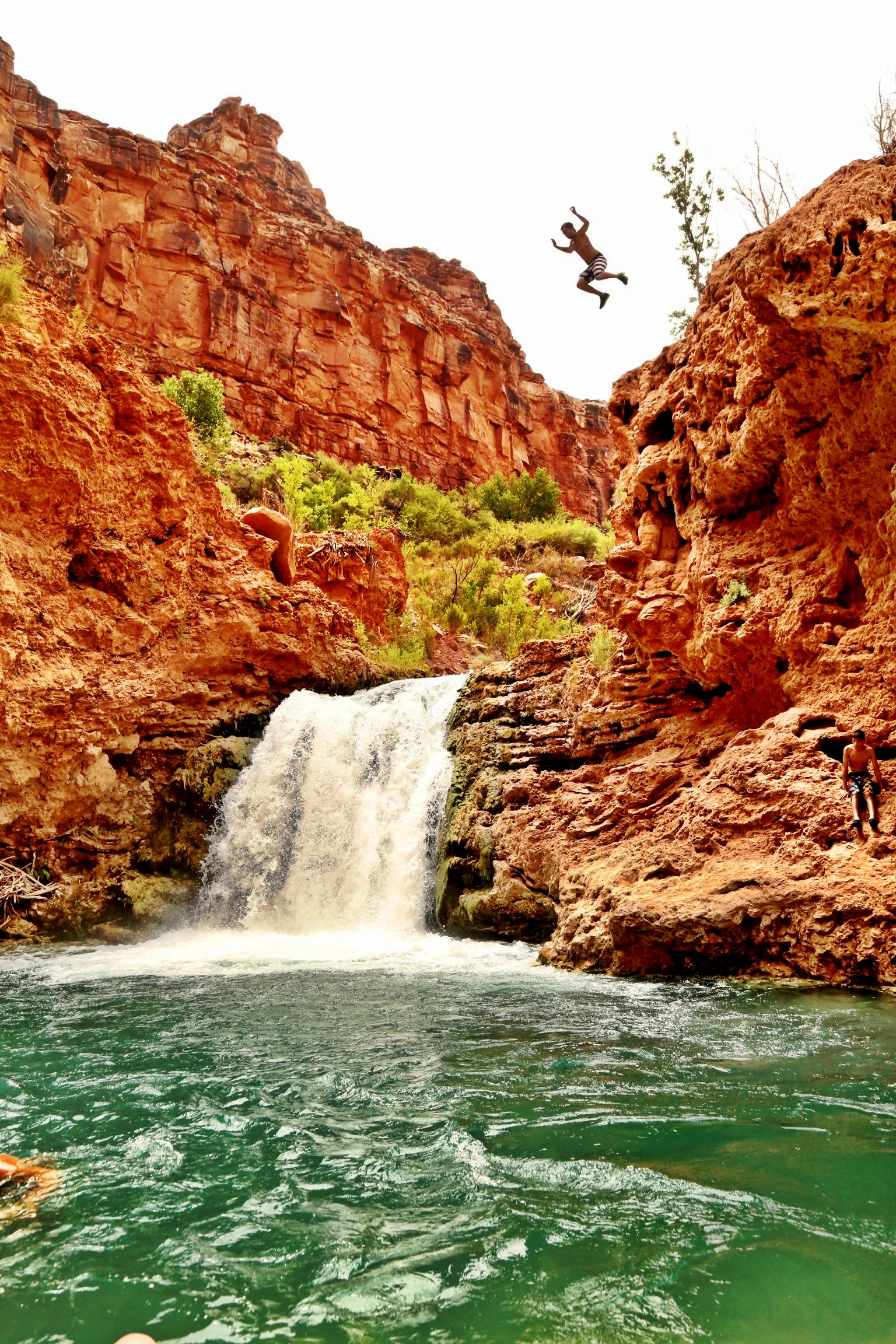
A person jumping off a cliff in Arizona. 2013

Cliff jumping is the leaping off a cliff edge, usually into a body of water, as a form of sport. It may be done as part of the sport of coastal exploration or as a standalone activity. Particular variations on cliff jumping may specify the angle of entry into the water or the inclusion or exclusion of human-made platforms or other equipment. Cliff jumping and its close relative tombstoning are specific to water landing (with diving usually implying a head-first entry and tombstoning implying a feet-first entry). Cliff jumping with the use of a parachute would typically be classified as a form of BASE jumping.

Cliff jumping has inherent dangers due to the high velocity that can be attained during a long fall and multiple cliff jumping deaths are reported every year.

In 2015 a world record for cliff jumping was set by Laso Schaller, with a jump of 58.8 m (193 ft).

== Major variants ==
=== Tombstoning ===
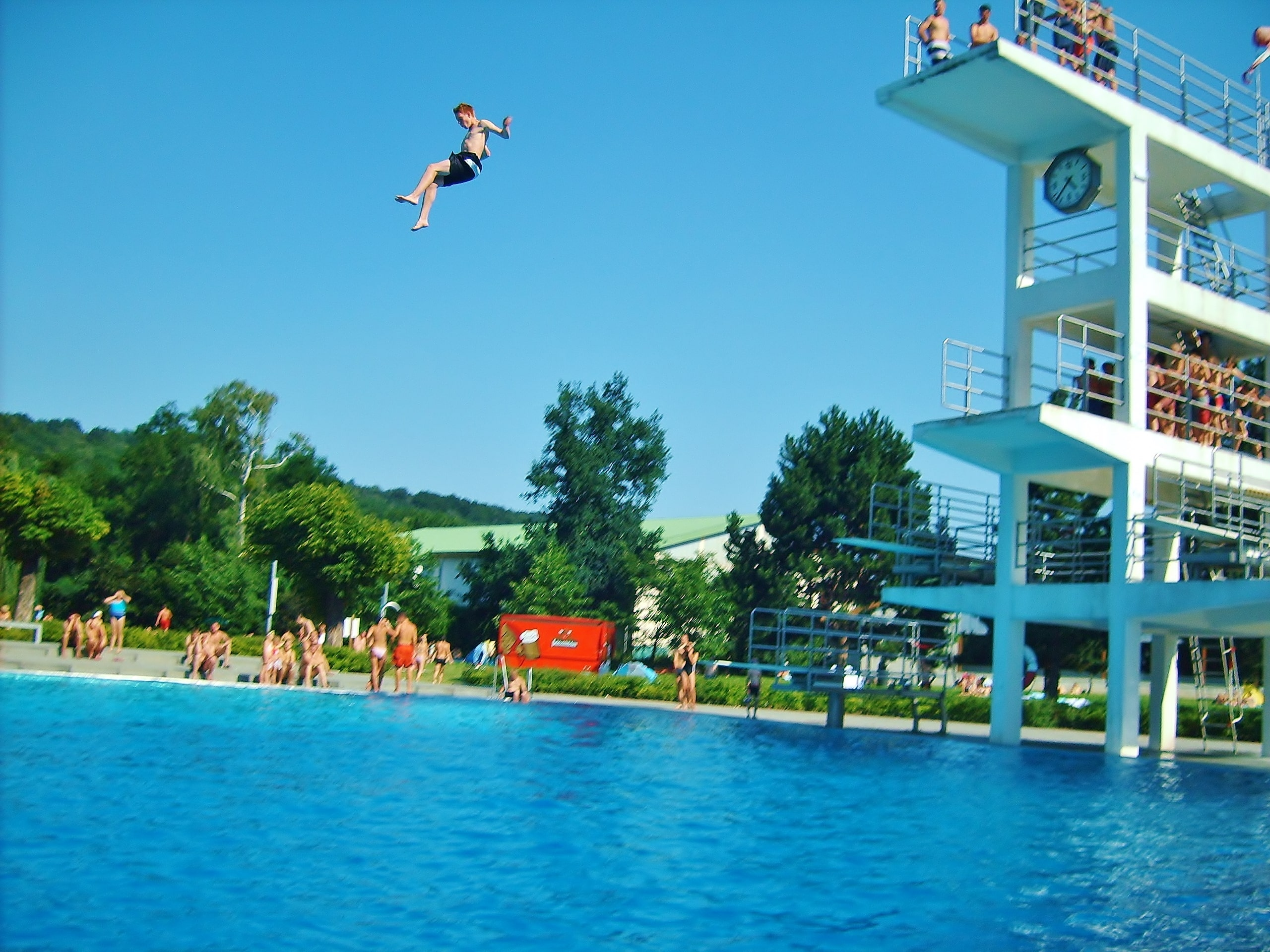
A jump from a 10 metre diving platform that has been performed by taking a running start. A running start increases the difficulty of the jump and the chances that the person may over rotate and impact the water with their stomach or back instead of their feet. Germany. 2007

Tombstoning is a form of cliff jumping popular in the United Kingdom characterized by an upright vertical position of the body. Once the person has jumped from the cliff edge or platform they maintain this upright vertical position until they reach the water surface, entering the water with their feet. The activity's name derives from a similarity between this posture and the form of a tombstone.

=== Platform jumping ===
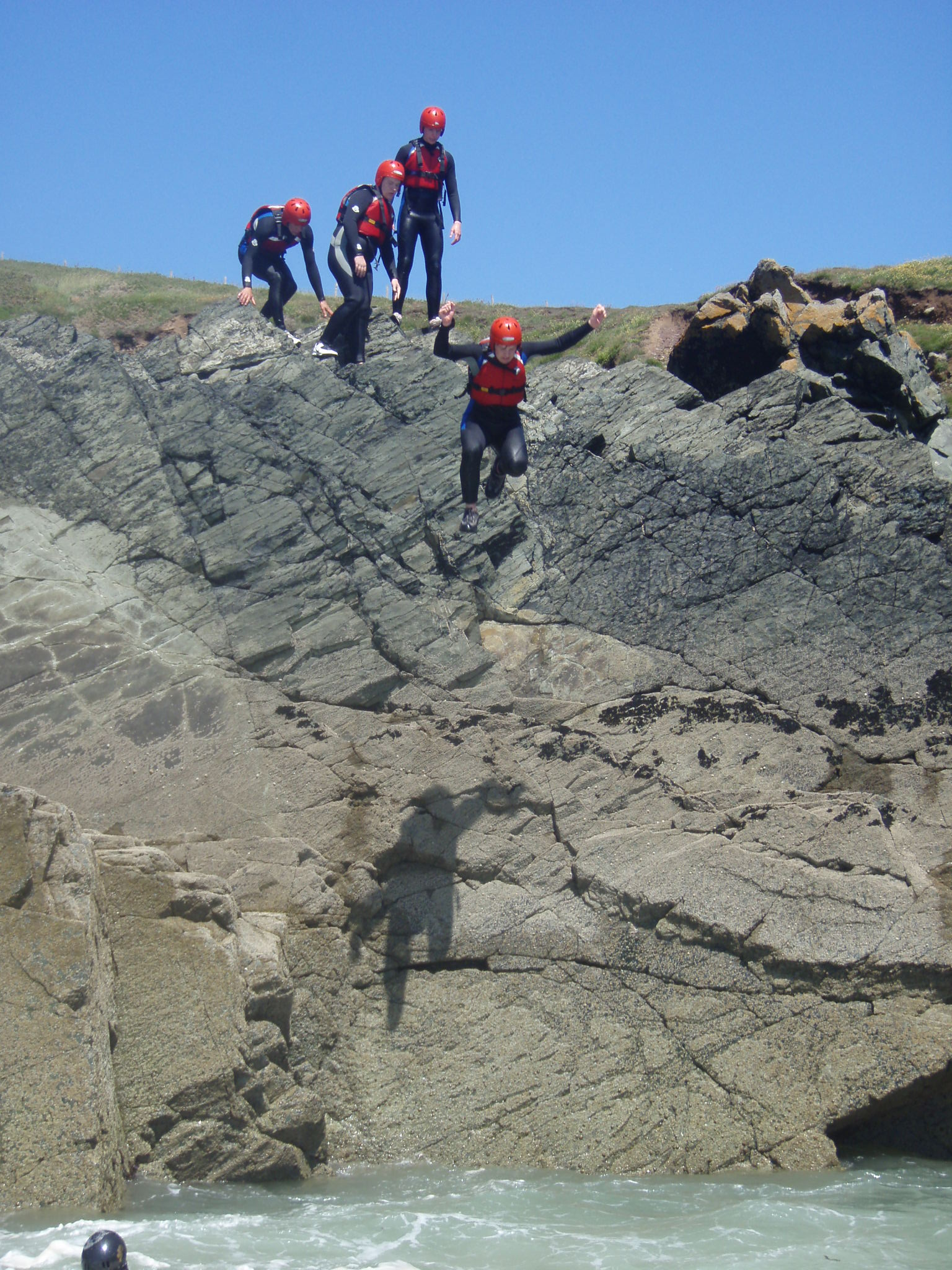
Cliff jumping as part of a coasteering adventure near Porthclais.

An alternative to a cliff as a launch point is a human-made platform. Jumping platforms may be purpose built or improvised, but they may also be repurposed existing infrastructure such as a railway bridges.

== Art ==
In the Tomb of Hunting and Fishing, there is a wall painting from around 530 to 500 BCE that shows a person climbing rocks towards a cliff face and a second person diving down the cliff face towards water.

The Tomb of the Diver in Paestum, contains a fresco dating to around 500 to 475 BCE that also shows a person diving into a pool or stream of water from a structure.

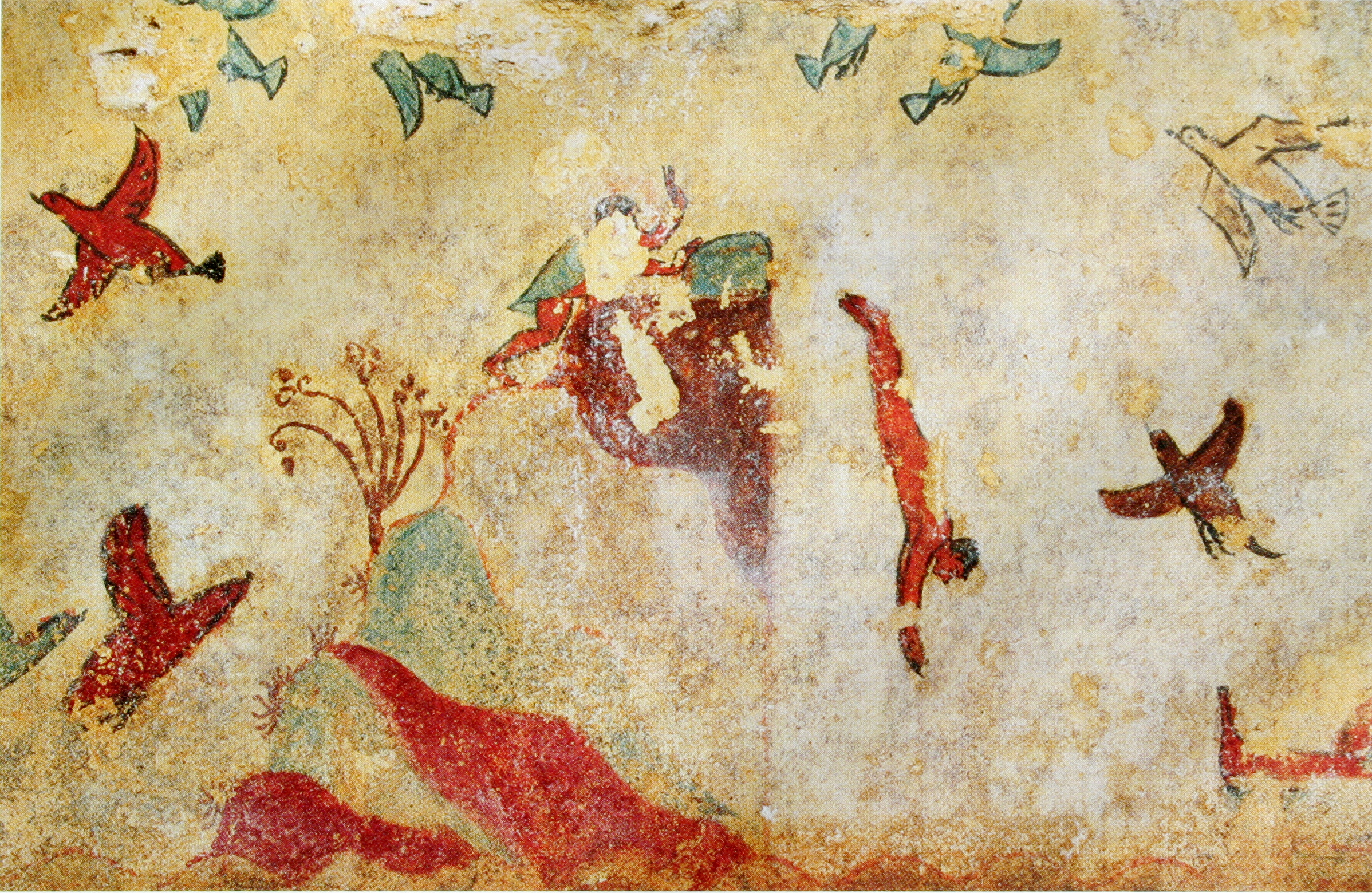
Fresco. Tomb of Hunting and Fishing. Monterozzi necropolis, Tarquinia, Italy. Around 530 - 500 BCE

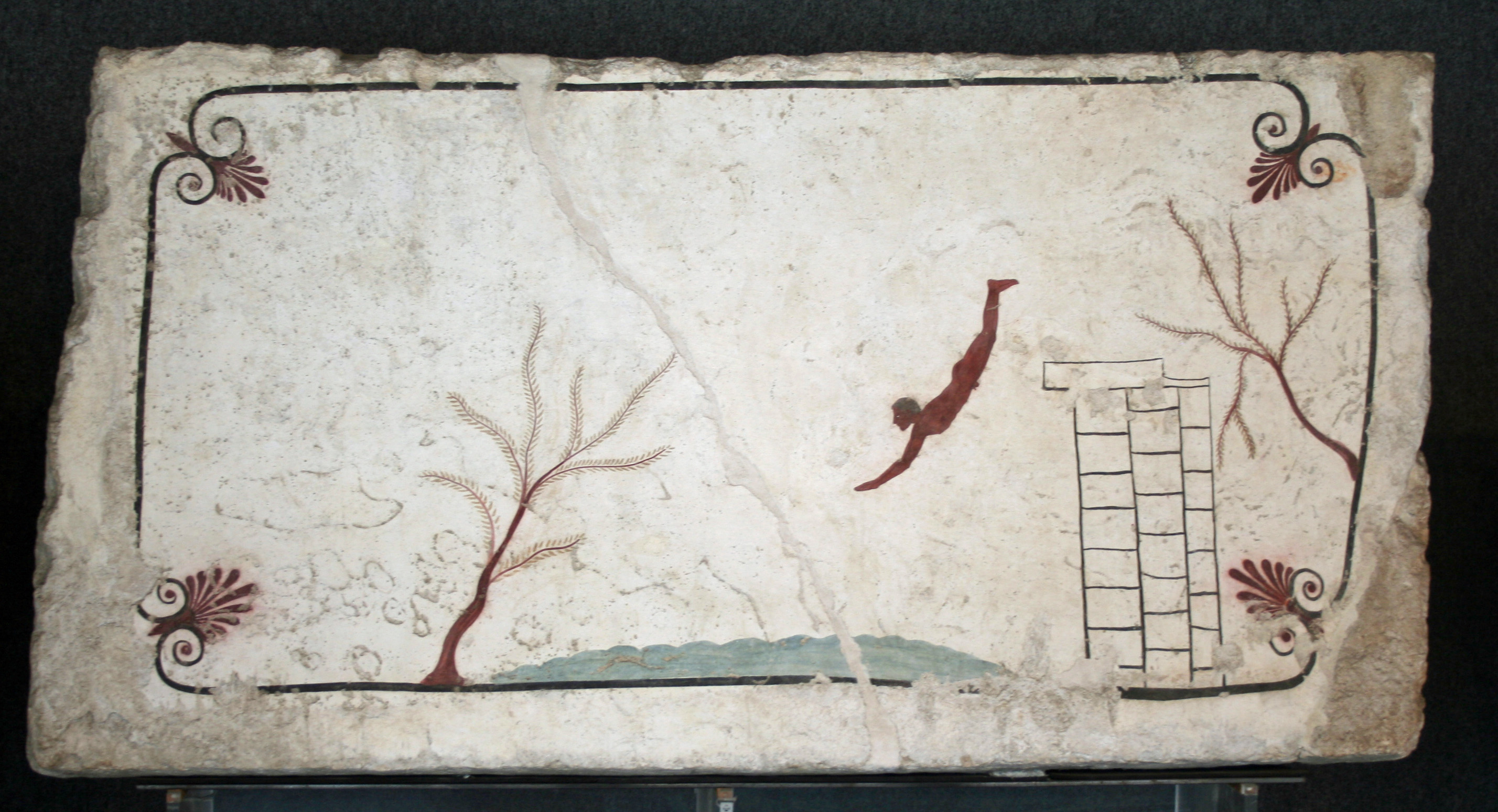
Fresco. Tomb of the Diver. Paestum, Italy. 470 BCE

== Injuries and deaths ==
In the UK between 2004 and 2008, cliff jumping lead to 139 incidents in which a rescue or emergency response was required. Spinal injuries occurred with 20% of these, and 12 people died. In the UK between 2005 and 2015, there were 83 people injured and 20 people who died whilst cliff jumping.

In recent years, injuries and deaths related to cliff jumping have increased calls for responses from local authorities and emergency services. A reaction to serious injuries and deaths at one popular tombstoning site, Plymouth Hoe, has led to the dismantling of seafront diving boards and closure of parts of the waterfront to discourage the activity.

== Dangers ==
=== Impact with water ===
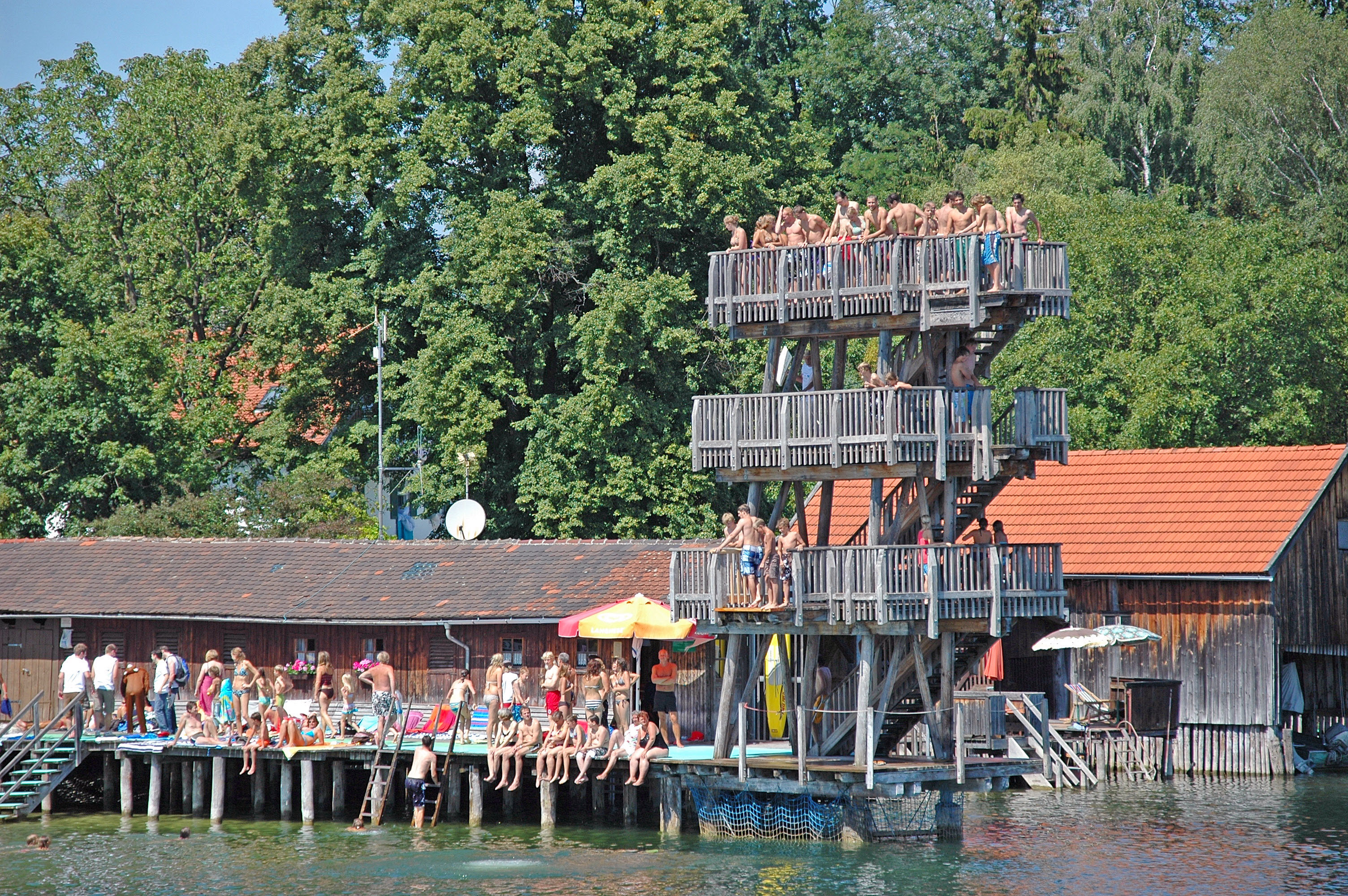
Lakeside diving platforms in Strandbad Utting am Ammersee, Germany. 2009

Water resistance increases with the speed of entry, so entering the water at high-velocity induces rapid and potentially dangerous deceleration. Jumping from a height of 20 feet (6.1 m) results in a person impacting with the water surface at 25 mph (40 km/h). Impacting with the water surface at this velocity is capable of giving a person temporary paralysis of the diaphragm, a compressed spine, broken bones, or concussion. Jumping from a height of 10 metres results in a person impacting with the water surface at 35 mph and if a person hits the water flat from 10 metres they are brought to rest in about 30 cm (1 ft). The deceleration from hitting the water flat from 10 metres can cause severe bruising both internally and externally, strains to connective tissue securing the organs and possible minor hemorrhaging to lungs and other tissues, possibly resulting in a person coughing up blood.

In 1989 a 22 year-old died from a broken neck after trying to backflip from "about 60 feet" (18 metres).

Before jumping from a cliff or platform a person may take a running approach and then jump into the water and the speed gained from a running approach will increase the person's net impact velocity.

Fall height	Velocity reached at water surface
5 feet (1.5 m)	12 mph (19 km/h)
10 feet (3.0 m)	17 mph (27 km/h)
20 feet (6.1 m)	25 mph (40 km/h)
33 feet (10 m)	35 mph (56 km/h)
50 feet (15 m)	38 mph (61 km/h)
85 feet (26 m)	53–62 mph (85–100 km/h)

=== Cold water shock ===
Cold water shock response occurs through the "rapid cooling of the skin and includes a gasp response followed by uncontrollable hyperventilation—obvious precursors to drowning."

A person can die when they aspirate into their lungs 22 ml of sea water per kilo of body mass. For a person weighing 70kg, death can occur when they aspirate one and a half litres of sea water, described as being "...one large inspiration."

For fresh water a person can die when they aspirate 44 ml per kg of fresh water. For a person weighing 70kg death can occur when they aspirate three litres of fresh water.

"Cold water shock causes the blood vessels in the skin to close, which increases the resistance of blood flow. Heart rate is also increased. As a result the heart has to work harder and your blood pressure goes up." Further that this "...rise in cardiac output and blood pressure can precipitate cardiovascular difficulties... [and] ...In such cases, survival time can be measured in seconds rather than hours."

"Cold water shock can therefore cause heart attacks, even in the relatively young and healthy."

In relation to cold water shock and sea temperatures "Anything below 15°C is defined as cold water and can seriously affect your breathing and movement... Average UK and Ireland sea temperatures are just 12°C."

"In the 1950s, scientists examined why English Channel swimmers could spend 12–20 h swimming in 12–15°C water, while estimated survival time in these temperatures was in the region of 6 h." and that "...this unusual capability of outdoor swimmers to endure cold water has been attributed to large deposits of subcutaneous fat and a high level of physical fitness; however, these swimmers can also habituate themselves by repeated immersions in cold water." and that the "...cold shock response can be reduced by 50% in as few as six 2-min cold immersions..." whilst the "Habituation of the shivering response needs longer immersions (>30 min)."

=== Impact with submerged objects or terrain ===
Submerged objects also pose a direct risk to jumpers, who may sustain severe physical trauma upon colliding with them, or risk becoming entangled and unable to surface. A too-shallow lakebed or seabed can also cause impact injury. In ocean conditions, tides can greatly affect water depth.

=== Currents and exiting the water ===
As with any other water-based activity, strong currents and rough waves can make timely exit from the water impossible and can lead to drowning whilst cliff faces and sea walls can also make climbing out of the water impossible.

== Famous jumpers ==
Sam Patch became the first famous stunt performer in America after successfully jumping from a height of more than 80 feet from a raised platform into the Niagara River near the base of Niagara Falls in 1829.

== Popular cliff jumping locations ==
A jump off the cliffs of Guffey Gorge

- Ponte Brolla, Switzerland
- Playa Forti, Curaçao
- Diving Board Island, Bermuda
- South Point, Hawaii, United States
- Negril, Jamaica
- Possum Kingdom Lake, Texas, United States
- Clarence Cove, Bermuda
- Nusa Lembongan, Bali
- Laie Point, Hawaii, United States
- La Quebrada, Acapulco, Guerrero, Mexico
- Amoudi Bay, Greece

== See also ==
- Seatrekking
- Coasteering

== Sources ==
- LaViolette, Patrick (2012), "Risk, Rescue and Recreation", Extreme Landscapes of Leisure: Not a Hap-Hazardous Sport, Ashgate, ISBN 978-1-4094-8889-7
- Williams, A. T.; Micallef, Anton (2009), Beach Management: Principles and Practice, Earthscan, ISBN 978-1-84977-003-3
