= Rock fishing =

Sea fishing from rocky outcrops

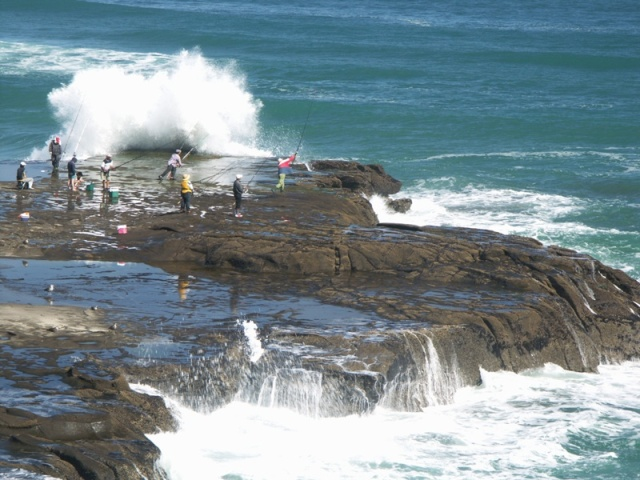
Extreme rock fishing off Muriwai Beach, New Zealand, 2006

Rock fishing is fishing from rocky outcrops into the sea. It is a popular pastime in Australia and New Zealand. It can be dangerous and many people have died as the result of it. This may improve as more people who are rock fishing are beginning to wear life jackets.

== Techniques ==
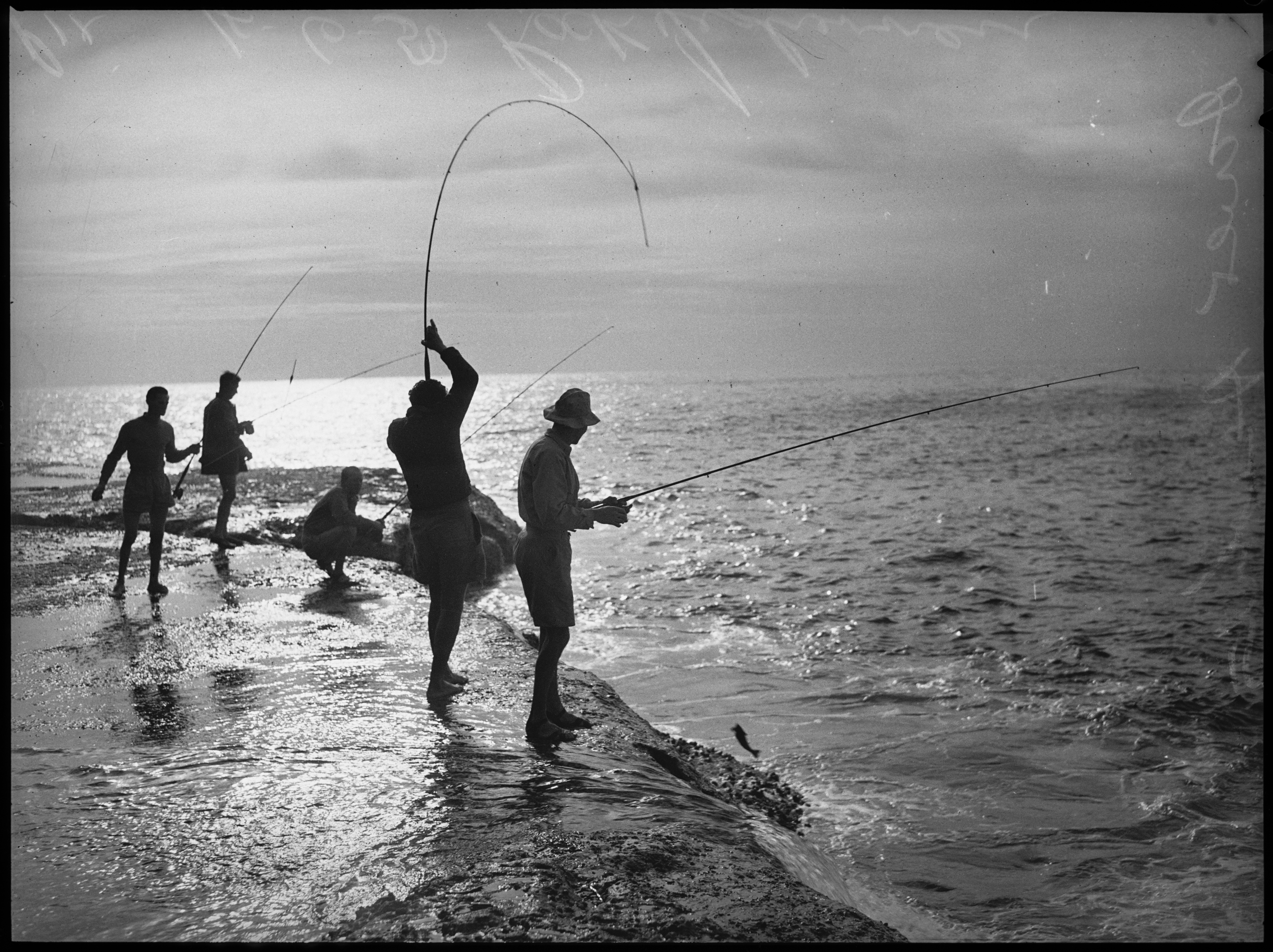
Rock fisherman at Dover Heights, Sydney, 1950

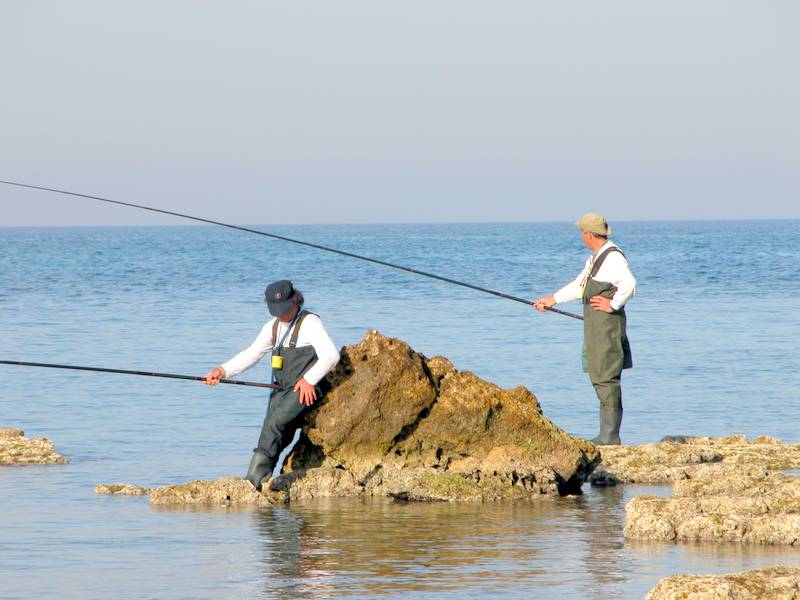
Tranquil rock fishing in Israel, 2004

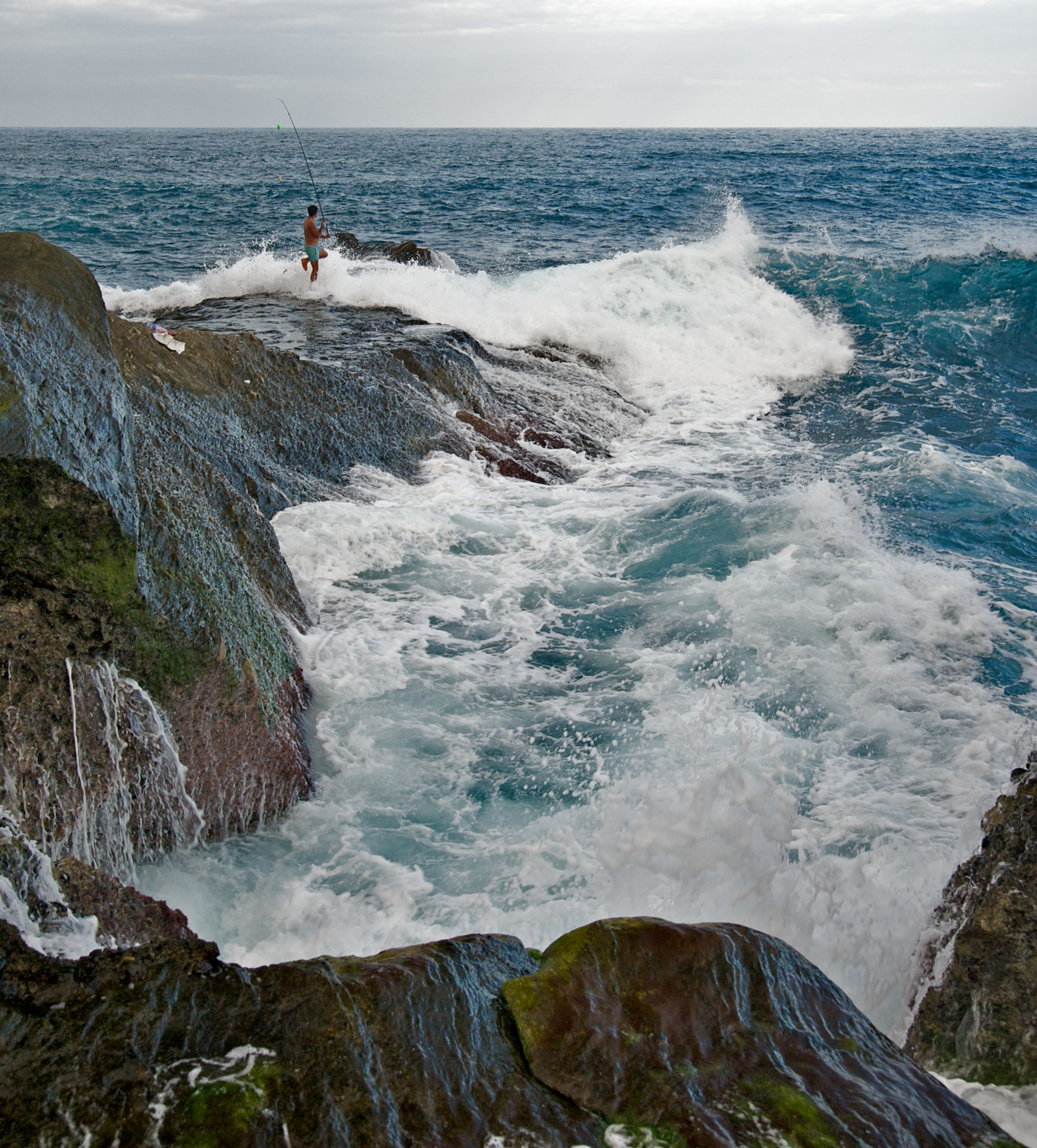
Rock fishing at Shihtiping in Taiwan, 2009

Rock fishing can be done with a rod and reel and line, or a line only.

Both ground and surface fishing are generally successful methods.

Rock fishing can be done both with artificial lures and natural bait. While bottom fishing typically relies on natural bait, both natural bait and artificial lures are used in different forms of surface rock fishing.

Some fishers who are rock fishing use an umbrella rig in spring, and use bait fish, such as perch and bluegill, in summer and autumn (the fall).

Using an umbrella rig is a method of trolling. Typically, an umbrella rig consists of four plastic neon green lures with a lead dragging behind. An additional lure is attached to the lead. Only the lure behind the lead will have hooks attached because this lure can appear to a stalking fish as the wounded or sick laggard in a school, making it a more likely target.

Another method of rock fishing is using bait fish. The bait fish may be bought from a store, or the angler can catch them himself. Bait fish can be used either whole or cut up into pieces. The size and type of bait fish used will vary depending what species is being targeted.

Problems may arise from the fact that sea bottom areas close to a rocky water's edge often consist of jagged rocks, which can cause a sinker rig to become snagged beyond recovery and thus be lost. Conversely, surface fishing with a float or buoy is often made difficult by the fact that rocky shore areas can have strong currents, in which light floats in particular can be carried away quickly from a desired area. Spin fishing as a form of surface fishing can allow more control over a lure or bait in these conditions.

== Techniques in Britain ==
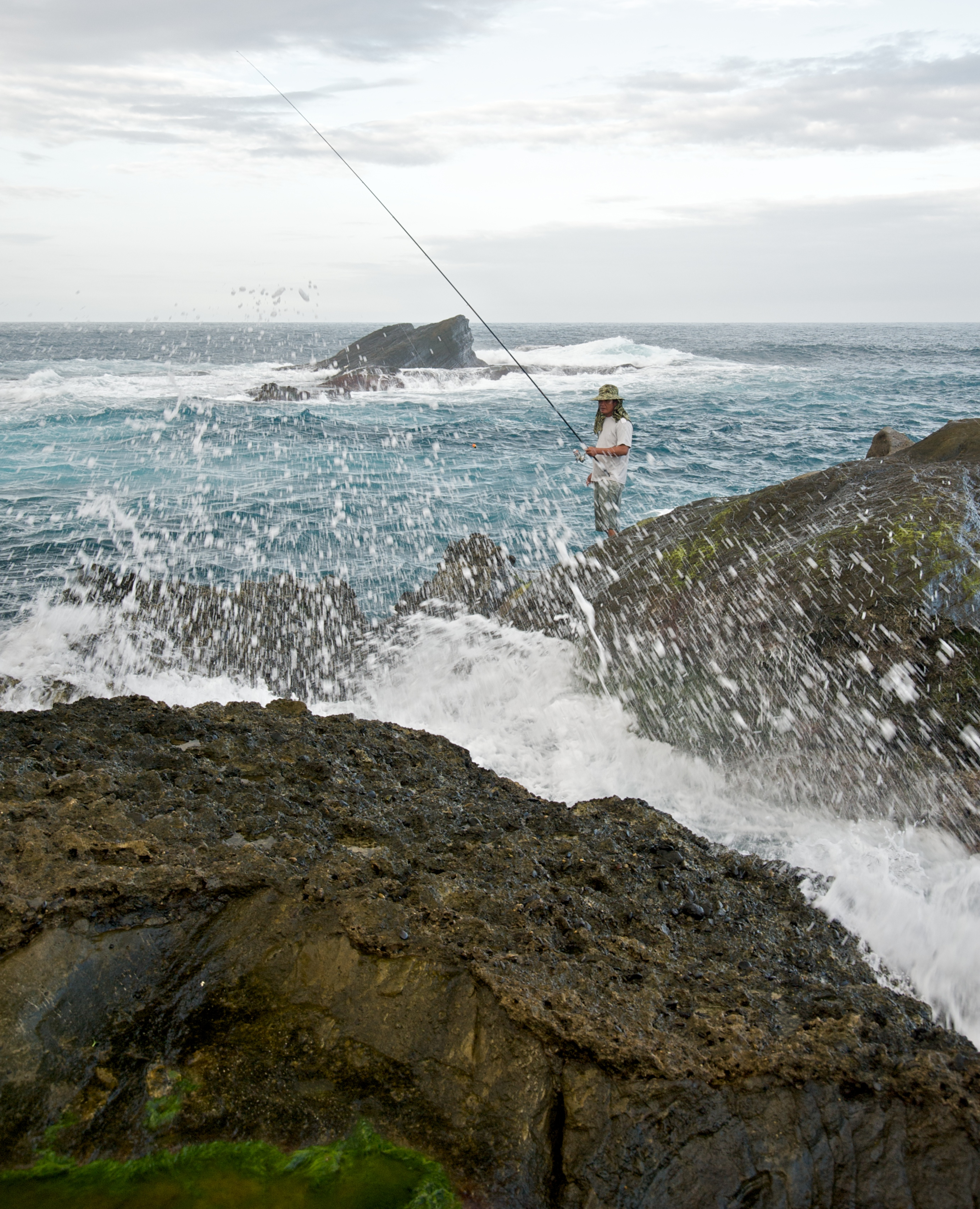
Rock fishing Shihtiping Taiwan, 2009

Rock Angling as the name suggests usually entails the angler fishing from a rock ledge or outcrop on the shore. This will usually allow the angler access to deeper water than from the beach, which usually means more fish.

An angler rock fishing will usually use a rod of between 10 and 11 feet when fishing from rocks although the full Beach Casters of 12 to 14 feet may be used when distance casting is required or a stiff rod is required due to rough ground. It is usual that only short casting is required from rocks to catch fish as they tend to be close in trying to feed of crabs and other animals. Again the angler may use a fixed spool reel or a multiplier reel loaded with line from as little as 8 pound (float fishing) to 30 pounds over rough ground. When fishing from rocks several different methods can be used such as bait fishing, spinning/plugging and float fishing. Bait fishing will be much the same as from the beach but the most common bait would now be peeler crab and hard back crab. Spinning/plugging involves casting an artificial lure or plug and retrieving it to induce a fish to 'take' attack the lure or plug. Whilst float fishing is simply suspending a bait usually a rag worm, sand eel of prawn below a float. The species of fish targeted will be the same as from the beach but will include species such as Ballan Wrasse. Species varie from coast to coast, but the main species from rock marks are conger eels, various species of ray, tope, cod, bass and bullhuss. A rotten bottom system is commonly used among professional anglers looking to cut down on tackle losses due to rocky snags.

== Injuries and deaths ==
In Australia between 2004 and 2019 192 people died in relation to rock fishing. 185 of these 192 deaths occurred from drowning. Of these 192 deaths "...waves and slippery surfaces contributed to 85%". This figure of 85% does not include the rock fishing deaths where the circumstances of what happened to the person prior to their death are unknown.

In Australia between 2004 and March 2021 nearly 200 people had died in relation to rock fishing.

In New South Wales between 1992 and 2000 74 people died in relation to rock fishing. It was reported that for rock fishing "...many people who have drowned received some sort of head injury."

In New Zealand between 1980 and 1995 63 people died from "Fishing from rocky shorelines...". In New Zealand between 2010 and 2020 31 people died in relation to rock fishing.

It was reported that "Between 2012-2016, 46 anglers died fishing off the UK coast, 25 of them while fishing from the shore." and "...that 70% of shore anglers who drowned were swept into the sea by waves."

== Safety ==
Safety measures include:

- carrying a device that can be used to call for help when in the water such as a VHF/DSC radio or mobile phone in a waterproof pouch
- having two other people present
- head protection
- life jacket - It has been reported that wearing a lifejacket increases your chances of surviving by 50%.
- lightweight gear "...that reduces problems if you do go into the surf such as shorts and a spray jacket.".
- non-slip shoes
- throw line

Safety measures for weather are to "Check the local weather forecast before you go" and "Spend 20-30 minutes watching the wind and wave conditions from a safe distance before deciding if a fishing spot is suitable."

Safety measures for fishing rods include "...using longer fishing rods, about ten feet or longer, increasing your vision of the ocean in front of you, watching the waves and swells, tidal and weather changes, landing your catch, and avoid getting snagged up. [A long rod] moves you backwards away from the edge of the rock platform danger zone, back further reducing those wash ins, slips, trips and fall ins."

== Wave periods ==
It was reported that "A wave period or interval is the time it takes for one complete wave length to pass a fixed point, and it’s given in seconds. Shorter wave periods can be eight to 12 seconds apart, they tend to look peakier and closer together." and "When the wave period is four to 12 seconds, you can see the wave heights that are dangerous more easily."

It was reported that "...longer wave periods can be 10 to 20 seconds apart and carry much more energy." During an 18-second wave period a person rock fishing from a shore platform may not have any large waves that are visible in the first 200 – 300 metres in front of the shore platform.

It was reported that for "12 rock fishing-related drownings in Randwick Council...", the "...wave period at both sites [in Randwick council] was longer than average at the time of drownings".

== Waves and tides ==
It has been reported that "For rock fishers, the speed of the tide can often come as a surprise. At mid-tide—generally three to four hours after the tide has turned—the tide can rise by half a metre, in half an hour. You can be on dry rocks one minute, and then before you know it waves are surging onto your platform."

It was also reported that "Over many hours a fisher may be unaware of the slowing changing water level of the tide and how this affects wave behaviour. As the tide drops, waves may begin to break more frequently in front of where you are fishing as the water becomes shallower, whereas a rising tide may make the waves surge onto the rock platform all of a sudden."

== Waves and weather ==
It has been reported for Australia that there can be circumstances where "...a low pressure weather system far out in the Pacific or the Southern Ocean may be generating local waves of 2 to 4 metres or more. These swells can travel for days and many hundreds of kilometres from where they were formed – losing their height but stretching out and keeping their power.

While they’re in deep water, these long, low swells are not a problem, but as they approach shallow water they break powerfully. Because the systems that generate these waves can be far off to the east, or far south of Australia, they do not always appear on local weather charts – and the swells can arrive when it is sunny and calm. Another source of danger is that these ‘sets’ of powerful waves... ...can arrive at lengthy intervals – often every 15–20 minutes...".

== See also ==
- Angling
- Artisanal fishing
- Coasteering
- Recreational fishing

== Notes ==
2014 National Coastal Safety Report
