= Phrenospasm =

Diaphragm spasm after an abdomen injury

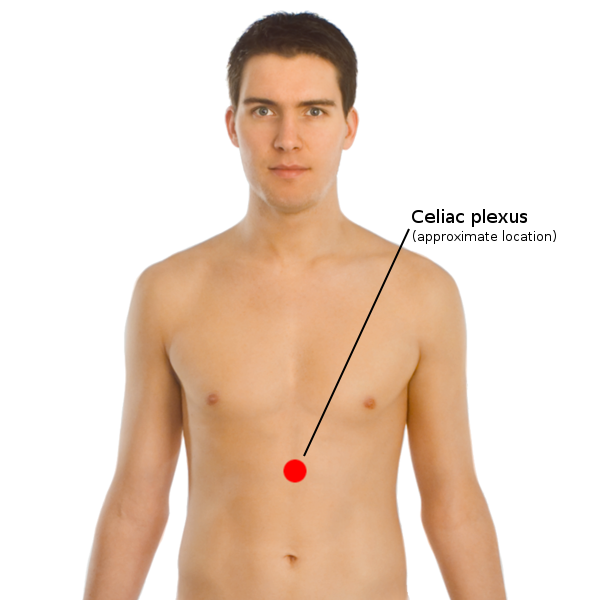
Approximate location of the solar plexus

Phrenospasm, sometimes referred to by the idiom getting the wind knocked out of you, is the reflexive spasm of the diaphragm that occurs when sudden force is applied to the upper central region of the abdomen and the solar plexus, causing difficulty of breathing. This often happens in contact sports, from a forceful blow to the abdomen, or by falling on the back.

The sensation of being unable to breathe can lead to anxiety and there may be residual pain from the original blow, but the condition typically clears spontaneously in a minute or two. Victims of such a "winding" episode often groan in a strained manner until normal breathing resumes. Loosening restrictive garments and flexing the hips and knees can help relieve the symptoms.
