= TUM AeroCarga =

Mexican airline

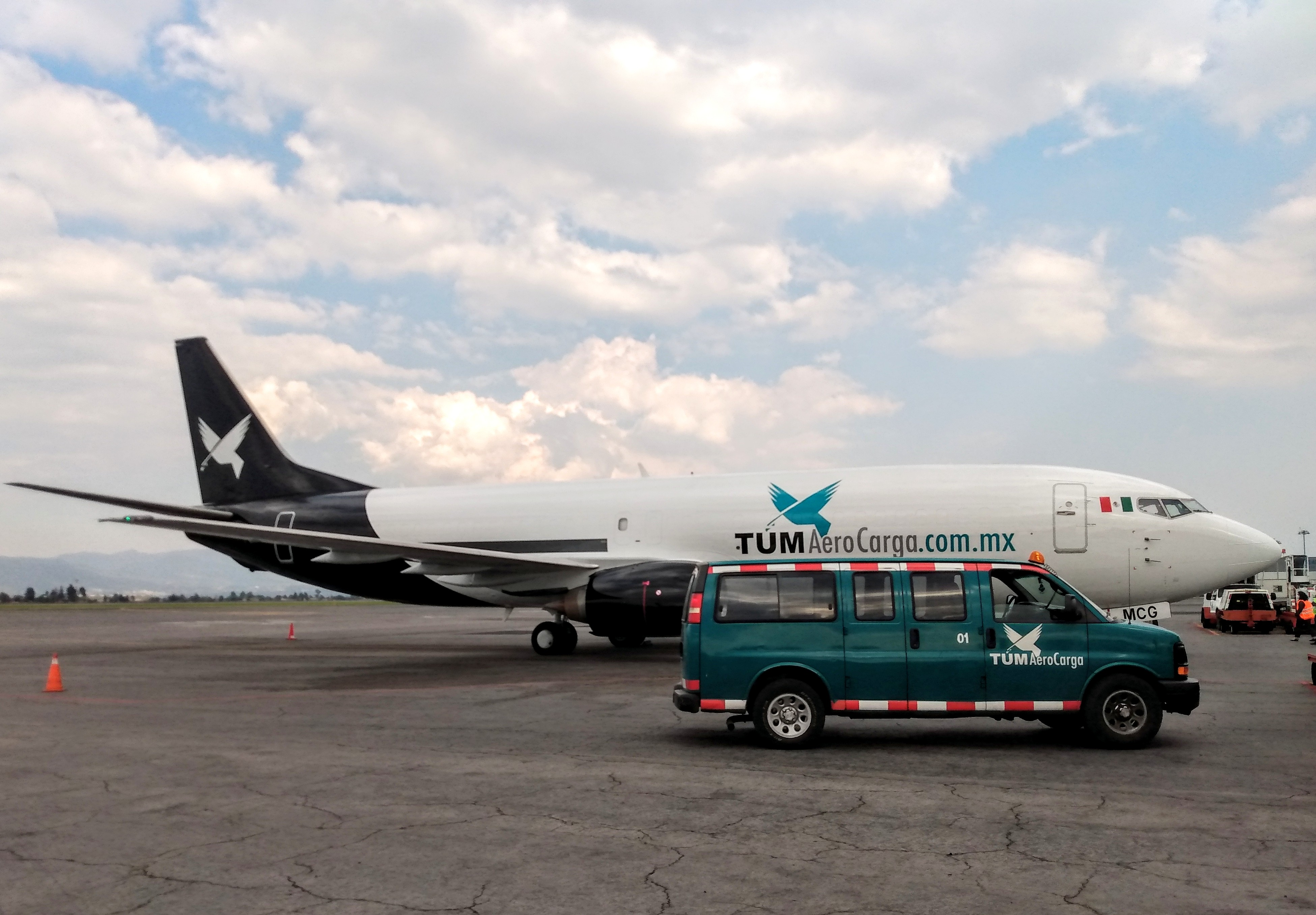
IATA	ICAO	Call sign
T2	MCS	CARMEX
- Founded: 2015; 11 years ago
- Commenced operations: July 28, 2015; 10 years ago
- Ceased operations: January 2025; 1 year ago
- Hubs: Toluca International Airport
- Secondary hubs: Miguel Hidalgo y Costilla Guadalajara International Airport
- Fleet size: 5
- Destinations: 25
- Parent company: Grupo TUM; MCS Holding
- Headquarters: Mexico City
- Website: www.mcs-aerocarga.com/

TUM Aerocarga (Formerly called MCS Aerocarga) was a Mexican cargo airline owned by MCS Holding Cargo Services and Grupo TUM.

== History ==
MCS Aerocarga emerged in 2015 through the joint participation between MCS Holding Cargo Services and Grupo TUM, based on operations at Mexico City International Airport, in order to generate a regular air cargo service taking advantage of the logistics network of both companies. Previously, MCS Holding Cargo Services operated air cargo through other airlines such as Volaris Carga and Lufthansa. However, excess baggage and the delay or cancellation of commercial flights with passengers made it difficult to transport express cargo, so in association With Grupo TUM and its close relationship with FedEx, it began the creation of a cargo airline, which entered service with a Bombardier CRJ-100 in July 2015.

The airline acquired two more Bombardier CRJ-100 aircraft during 2015, and a CRJ-200 aircraft in 2017. By January 2018 the airline changed its name to TUM AeroCarga and in July of that same year it acquired a Boeing 737-300 converted to freighter, which was previously in service with Air Costa Rica.

Due to the difficulties with the allocation of slots at Mexico City International Airport, the airline moved its operations to Toluca Airport in May 2017, allowing for greater punctuality in the itineraries and greater efficiency in cargo operations.

In 2021, TUM Aerocarga is planning on starting a new low-cost airline named VLU. The new airline would operate 5 Bombardier CRJ-200 aircraft and be based out of Toluca International Airport.

TUM Aerocarga ceased operations in January 2025, the same month in which it returned most of its fleet to the lessor.

== Fleet ==
As of August 2025, TUM AeroCarga operated the following aircraft during it existence:

TUM AeroCarga fleet
Aircraft	In service	Orders	Registration	Note
Boeing 737-400SF	2			
Bombardier CRJ-200ER(PF)	1	—		
Bombardier CRJ-200LR(PF)	2	—		
Total	5			

== Destinations ==
TUM Aerocarga served 25 destinations in 7 routes

City	State	ATA	ICAO	Airport	Note
Acapulco	Guerrero	ACA	MMAA	Acapulco International Airport	
Cancún	Quintana Roo	CUN	MMUN	Cancún International Airport	
Chihuahua	Chihuahua	CUU	MMCU	Chihuahua International Airport	
Ciudad Juárez	Chihuahua	CJS	MMCS	Ciudad Juárez International Airport	
Guadalajara	Jalisco	GDL	MMGL	Miguel Hidalgo y Costilla Guadalajara International Airport	
Hermosillo	Sonora	HMO	MMHO	Hermosillo International Airport	
La Paz	Baja California Sur	LAP	MMLP	La Paz International Airport	
Manzanillo	Colima	ZLO	MMZO	Playa de Oro International Airport	
Mazatlán	Sinaloa	MZT	MMMZ	Mazatlán International Airport	
Mérida	Baja California	MID	MMMD	Mérida International Airport	
Mexicali	Nuevo León	MXL	MMML	Mexicali International Airport	
Monterrey	Nuevo León	MTY	MMMY	Monterrey International Airport	
Nuevo Laredo	Tamaulipas	NLD	MMNL	Nuevo Laredo International Airport	
Oaxaca	Oaxaca	OAX	MMOX	Oaxaca International Airport	
Puerto Vallarta	Jalisco	PVR	MMPR	Licenciado Gustavo Díaz Ordaz International Airport	
Querétaro	Querétaro	QRO	MMQT	Querétaro Intercontinental Airport	
Reynosa	Tamaulipas	REX	MMRX	General Lucio Blanco International Airport	
Saltillo	Coahuila	SLW	MMIO	Saltillo Airport	
Tampico	Tamaulipas	TAM	MMTM	Tampico International Airport	
Tijuana	Baja California	TIJ	MMTJ	Tijuana International Airport	
Toluca	Estado de México	TLC	MMTO	Toluca International Airport	
Torreón	Coahuila	TRC	MMTC	Torreón International Airport	
Tuxtla Gutiérrez	Chiapas	TGZ	MMTG	Tuxtla Gutiérrez International Airport	
Veracruz	Veracruz	VER	MMVR	Veracruz International Airport	
Villahermosa	Tabasco	VSA	MMVA	Villahermosa International Airport	
Total: 25 destinations in México
