= Toluca International Airport =

International airport in Toluca, Mexico

Toluca International Airport Aeropuerto Internacional de Toluca

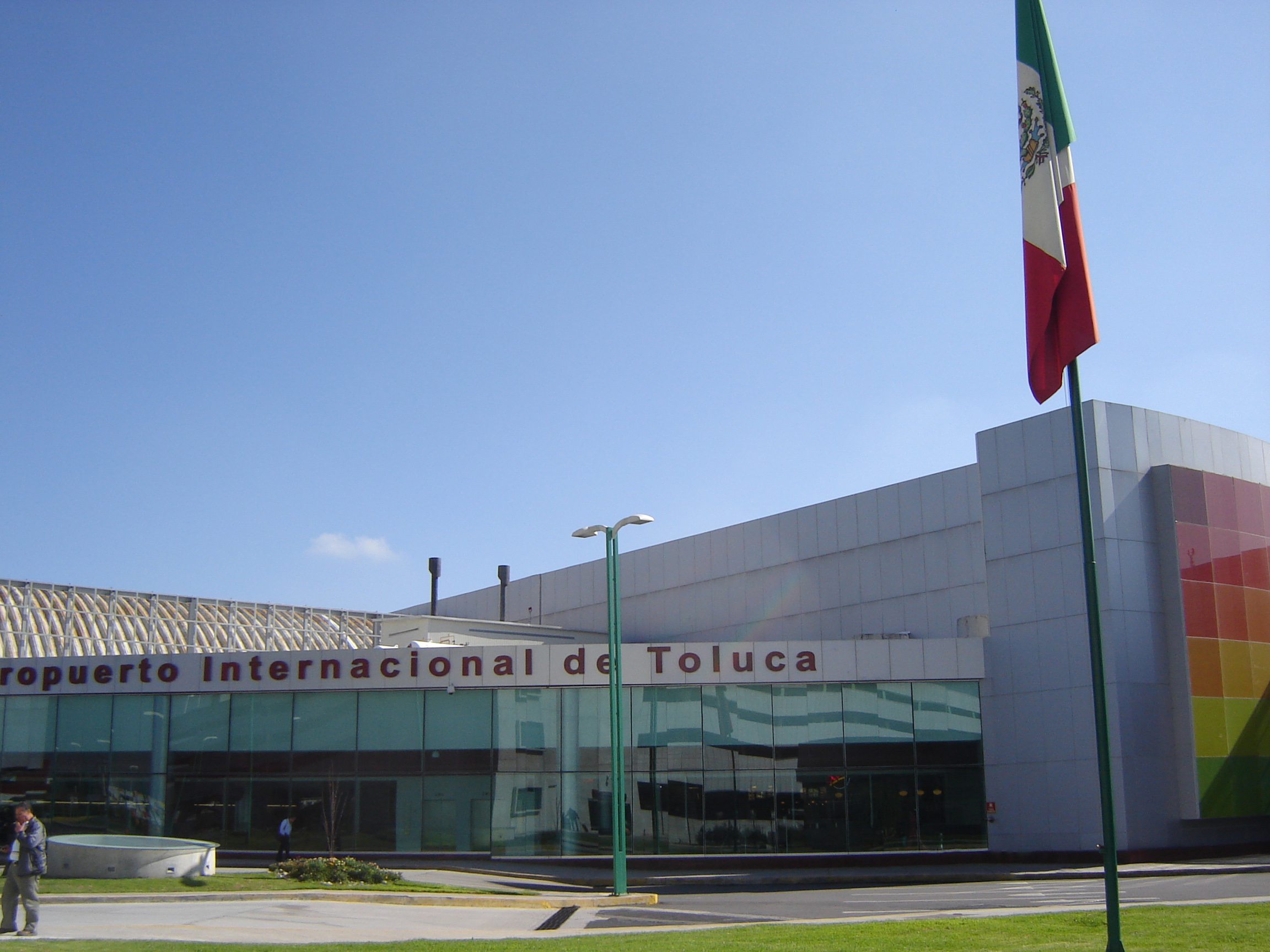
- IATA: TLC; ICAO: MMTO

Summary
- Airport type: Public
- Operator: Administradora Mexiquense del Aeropuerto Internacional de Toluca (AMAIT)
- Serves: Toluca, Greater Mexico City
- Location: Toluca, State of Mexico, Mexico
- Opened: 1984
- Hub for: TUM AeroCarga
- Time zone: CST (UTC-06:00)
- Elevation AMSL: 2,580 m (8,460 ft)
- Coordinates: 19°20′13″N 99°33′57″W
- Website: www.aeropuertodetoluca.com.mx

Map
- Location of airport in the State of Mexico TLC (Mexico)

Runways
Direction	Length		Surface
Direction	m	ft	Surface
15/33	4,310	14,140	Asphalt

Statistics (2025)
- Total passengers: 1,927,498
- Ranking in Mexico: 16th ▲3
- Source: Administradora Mexiquense del Aeropuerto Internacional de Toluca

Toluca International Airport (Spanish: Aeropuerto Internacional de Toluca); officially Aeropuerto Internacional Licenciado Adolfo López Mateos (Licenciado Adolfo López Mateos International Airport) (IATA: TLC, ICAO: MMTO) is an international airport in Toluca, State of Mexico, Mexico. It handles both national and international air traffic for the Metropolitan area of Toluca and serves as a secondary airport for Greater Mexico City, alongside Felipe Angeles Airport. Historically serving as a hub for Volaris, Interjet, and Republicair, the airport is operated by Administradora Mexiquense del Aeropuerto Internacional de Toluca and is named after President Adolfo López Mateos.

Toluca Airport serves as the primary airport for operating executive and general aviation traffic in the Greater Mexico City airspace, ranking fifth busiest in Mexico for both aircraft movements and cargo operations. It serves as a primary base for charter airlines such as Aerolíneas Ejecutivas, Aeromaan, Aviesa, Flymex, and a hub for the cargo airline TUM AeroCarga. The airport also accommodates cargo and aircraft maintenance facilities, and services for air taxis, air ambulances, and aviation schools. It served 1,927,498 passengers in 2025.

== History ==
The development of Toluca Airport has been significantly shaped by efforts to address congestion challenges at Mexico City International Airport, stemming from urban constraints since the 1980s. Construction of Toluca Airport commenced in 1970, with its inauguration taking place in 1984.

In 1994, the federal government implemented legislation to mitigate congestion at Mexico City International Airport by prohibiting general aviation operations and redirecting them to secondary airports like Toluca. Consequently, Toluca Airport's importance increased, managing the majority of general aviation traffic in the Mexico City airspace.

Political initiatives have also been introduced to establish nearby airports, including Toluca, along with Puebla, Cuernavaca, and Querétaro, as supplementary options for serving the Mexico City area. This initiative, known as the Metropolitan Airport System, was promoted by the federal administration.

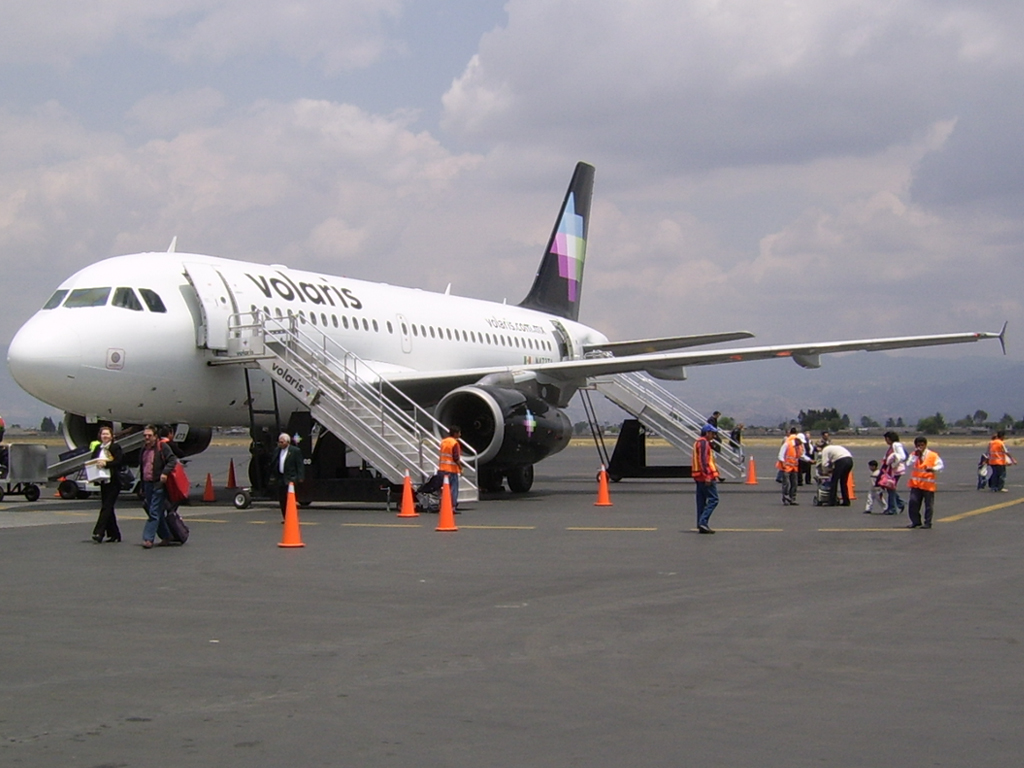
Volaris Airbus A319 at TLC

During the 2000s, Toluca Airport played a pivotal role in the initial growth of low-cost carriers in Mexico. Volaris and Interjet, key players in this sector, established Toluca as their primary hub, each operating from independent terminals until 2007. The airport experienced a substantial increase in passenger traffic from 145,000 in 2002 to 4,300,000 in 2008, leading to renovations and expansions. During this period, other airlines, including Aeromexico Connect, Click Mexicana, Republicair, and TAESA Airlines, served Toluca. The airport provided international service to the United States through Continental Express and Spirit Airlines, as well as to Caracas, Venezuela through Conviasa and Madrid, Spain through Air Madrid.

However, following Mexicana's bankruptcy in 2011, Volaris relocated its hub to Guadalajara, and Interjet shifted operations to Mexico City, resulting in a consistent decline in passenger traffic from 1,161,064 in 2013 to 134,305 by 2021. Consequently, Toluca Airport consolidated its operations, reducing its terminals from four to two, with all activities now centralized at the Domestic Terminal. Toluca currently stands as the largest metropolitan area in Mexico without any international flight services.

Most travellers to Toluca opt for Mexico City International Airport, located less than 50 kilometres (31 mi) to the east, offering extensive connectivity through highways and bus services. The recent inauguration of Mexico City-Felipe Angeles Airport has introduced additional challenges in attracting commercial flights. Flight figures have fluctuated, with a significant rebound after 2022 when Volaris, Viva, and TAR resumed commercial services, resulting in a traffic volume of almost 2 million passengers by the end of 2025.

== Facilities ==
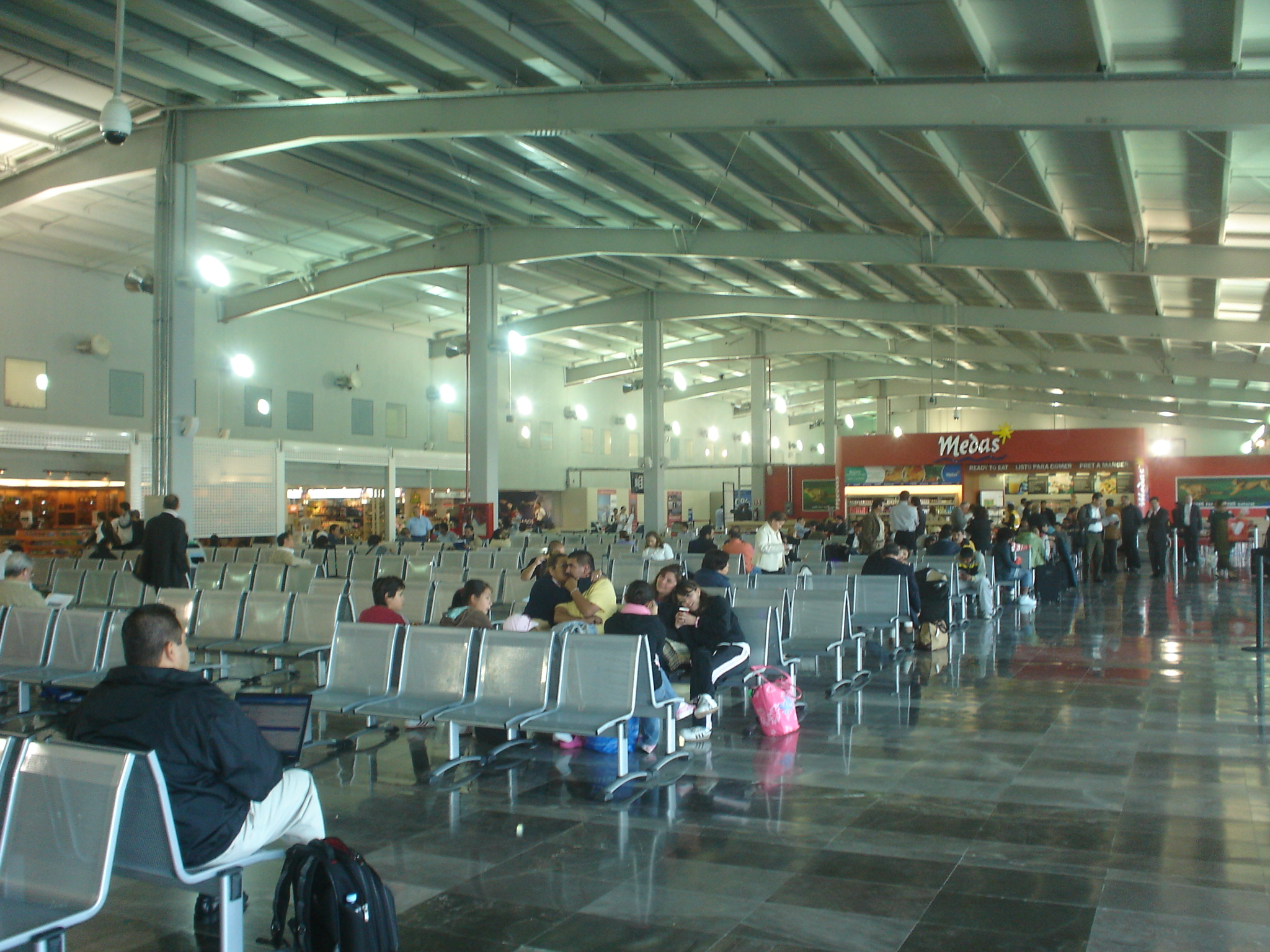
Departures concourse

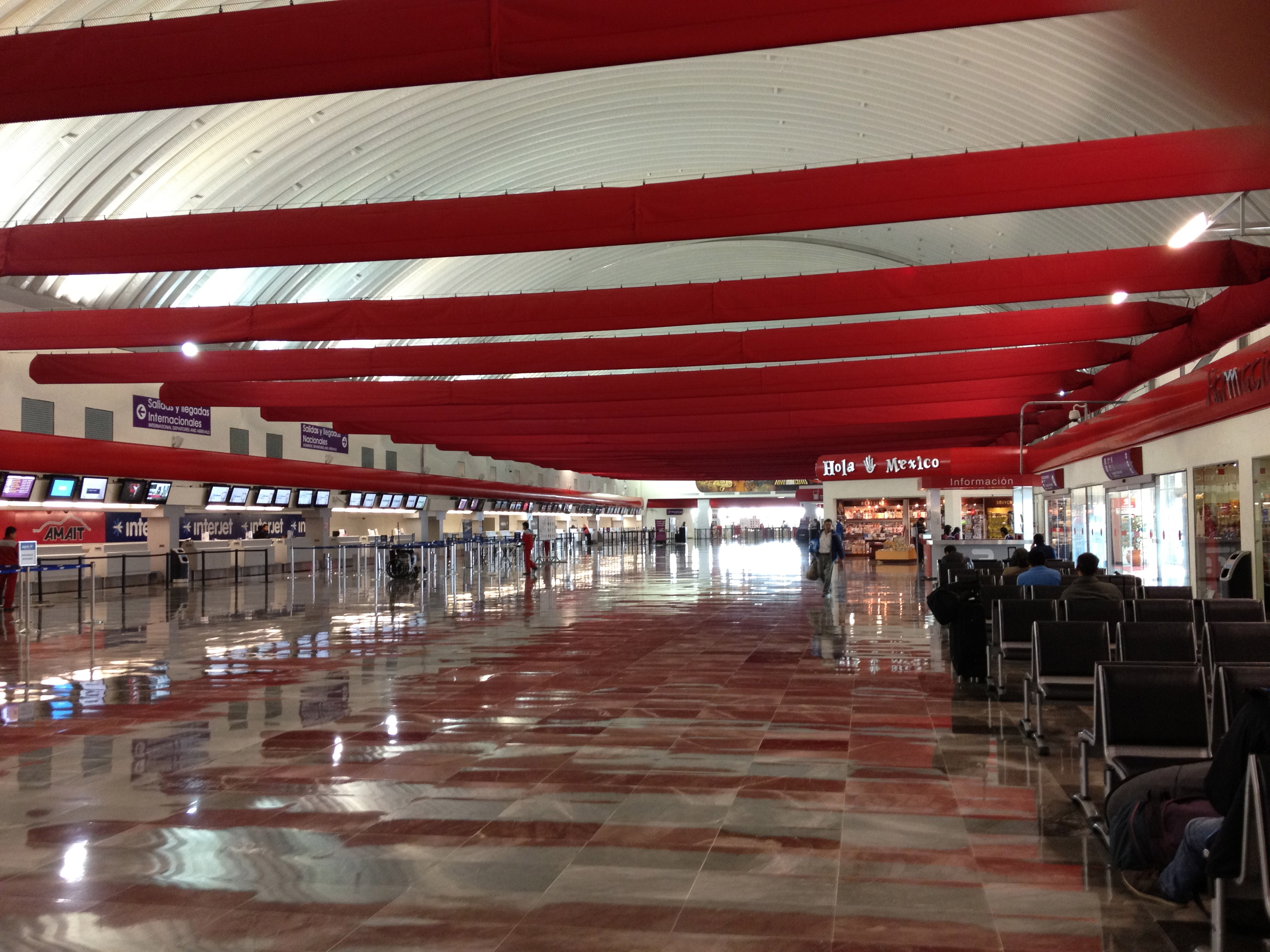
Check-in counters

The airport is situated 10 kilometres (6.2 mi) northeast of Toluca city center and 30 kilometres (19 mi) west of affluent neighborhoods like Santa Fe in Mexico City. Its elevated location at 2,660 metres (8,730 ft) imposes payload restrictions on aircraft. Consequently, the airport boasts a 4,310 metres (14,140 ft) runway, the second longest in Mexico after Felipe Ángeles International Airport, and is the first in Mexico equipped with ILS CAT II/IIIA approaches.

The passenger terminal, a single-story structure, includes arrival and departure facilities with standard services. These encompass parking, check-in, security, a VIP lounge, snack bars, shops, immigration and customs facilities, baggage-claim areas, car rental services, taxi stands, and a departure concourse with 15 gates providing direct apron access for passengers to board by walking to their aircraft.

The airport also features multiple aprons and facilities for general and executive aviation, hosting logistics and courier companies. Administrative facilities and multiple hangars cater to air taxi, VIP charters, aircraft management, air ambulance, cargo, and aircraft repair operations.

== Airlines and destinations ==
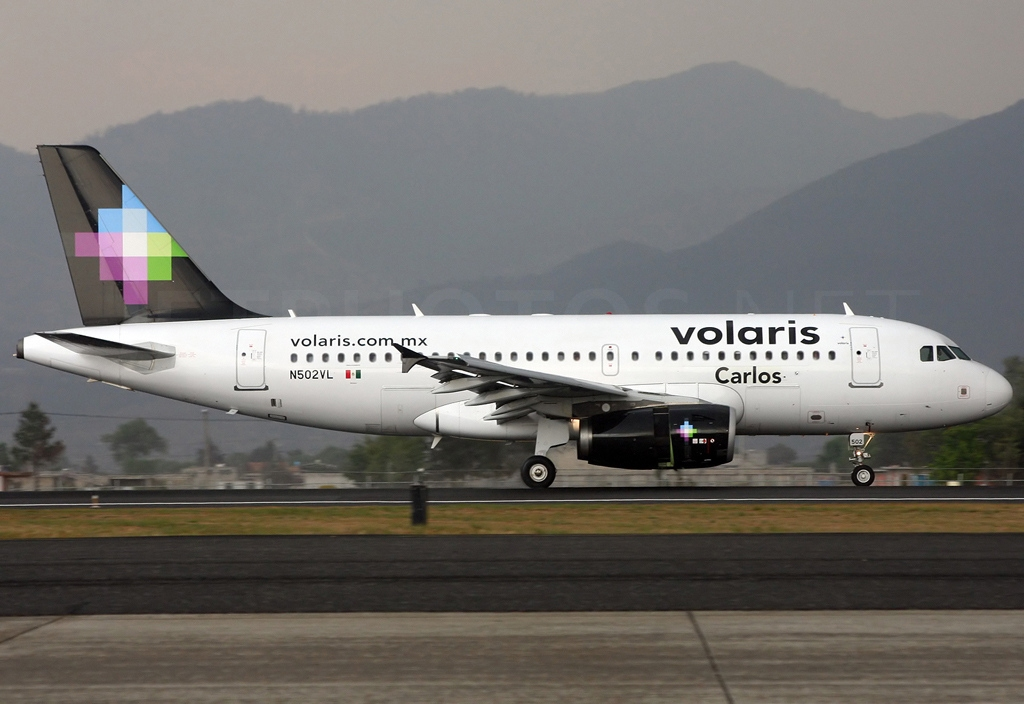
Volaris Airbus A319 at TLC

=== Passenger ===
Airlines	Destinations
Viva	Cancún, Mérida, Monterrey, Puerto Vallarta, San José del Cabo
Volaris	Cancún, Guadalajara, Monterrey, Puerto Vallarta, San José del Cabo, Tijuana

=== Cargo ===
As of 2025, FedEx Express is the only airline to serve cargo flights from Toluca to Memphis, which operates weekly.

Airlines	Destinations
FedEx Express	Memphis
TUM AeroCarga	Cancún, Ciudad Juárez, Guadalajara, Hermosillo, Mazatlán, Mérida, Monterrey, Nuevo Laredo, Oaxaca, Querétaro, Reynosa, Tijuana, Veracruz, Villahermosa

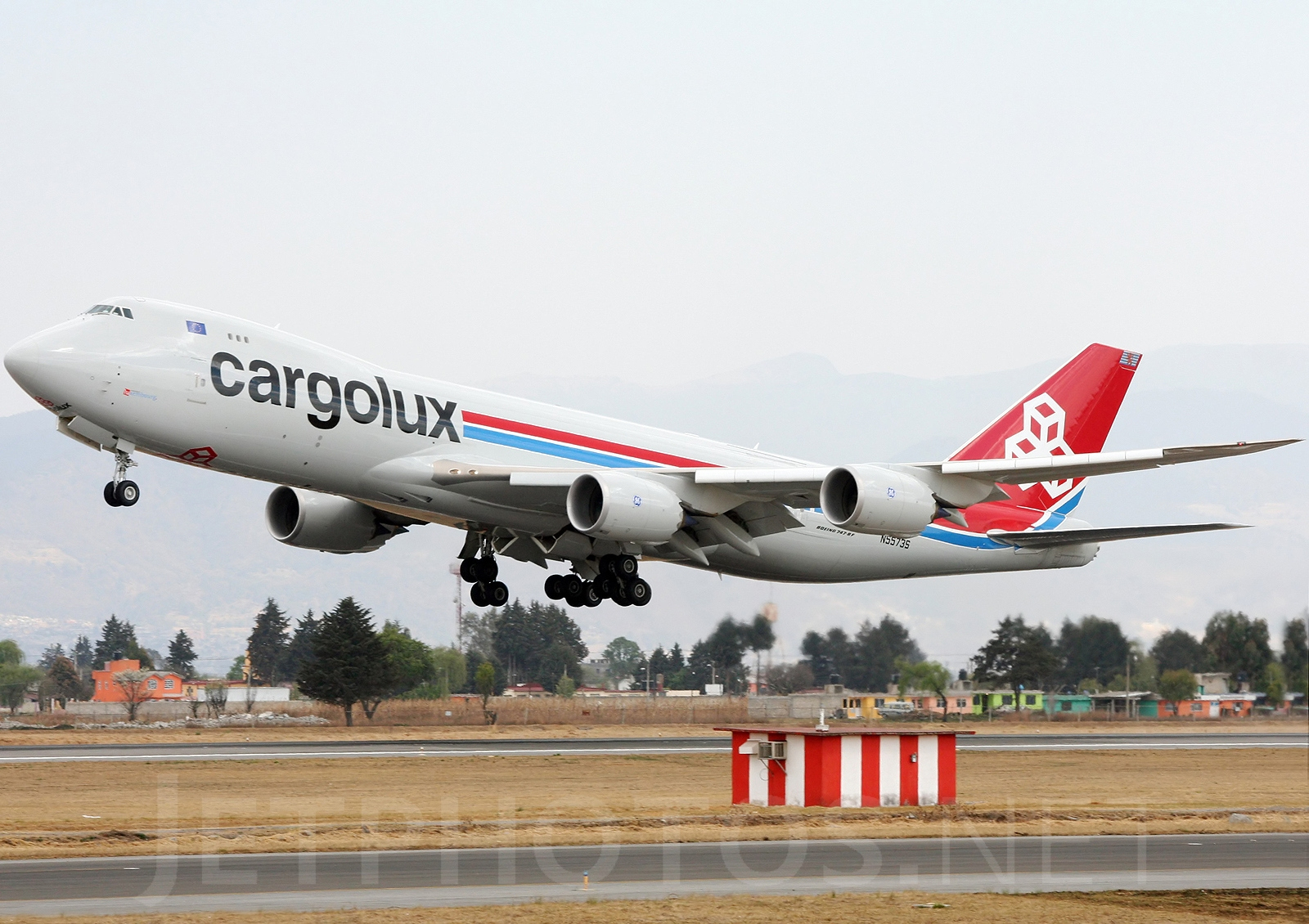
Cargolux Boeing 747-8R7F at TLC

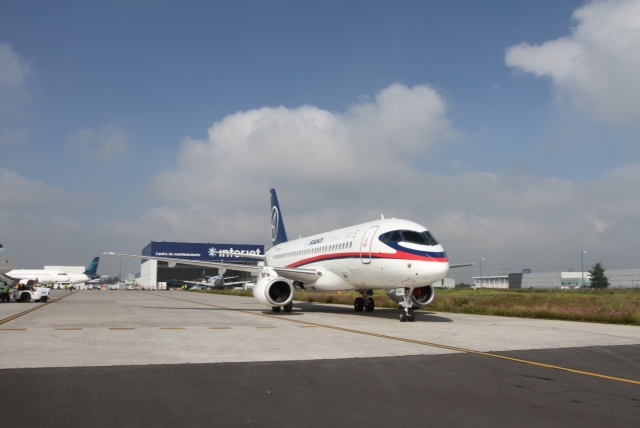
Sukhoi Superjet 100 at TLC

=== Destinations map ===
Domestic destinations from Toluca International Airport
Red = Year-round destination
Blue = Future destination
Green = Seasonal destination

== Statistics ==
=== Annual traffic ===
Passenger statistics at Toluca International Airport
Year	Total Passengers	change %	Cargo movement (t)	change %	Air Operations	change %
2006	2,051,895	Steady	31,372	Steady	83,995	Steady
2007	3,300,275	▲60.84%	29,143	▼7.10%	87,812	▲4.54%
2008	3,949,611	▲19.67%	25,804	▼11.45%	96,801	▲10.23%
2009	2,489,577	▼36.96%	23,903	▼7.36%	79,830	▼17.53%
2010	2,270,767	▼8.78%	25,714	▲7.57%	74,114	▼7.16%
2011	1,579,115	▼30.45%	30,393	▲18.19%	79,332	▲7.04%
2012	987,051	▼37.49%	26,758	▼11.95%	87,630	▲10.45%
2013	1,161,064	▲17.62%	26,516	▼0.90%	91,945	▲4.92%
2014	867,096	▼25.31%	26,696	▲0.67%	95,423	▲3.78%
2015	865,037	▼0.23%	25,437	▼4.71%	95,063	▼0.37%
2016	771,152	▼10.85%	21,827	▼14.19%	101,695	▲6.97%
2017	789,081	▲2.3%	31,159	▲42.75%	101,186	▼0.50%
2018	691,712	▼12.34%	36,491	▲17.11%	96,725	▼4.41%
2019	689,001	▼0.39%	35,779	▼1.95%	84,723	▼12.41%
2020	215,701	▼68.69%	39,571	▲20.36%	55,118	▼29.32%
2021	134,305	▼37.74%	54,943	▲38.85%	70,387	▲27.70%
2022	585,036	▲335.60%	43,205	▼21.36%	74,710	▲6.14%
2023	1,520,255	▲159.86%	37,694	▼12.76%	78,816	▲5.50%
2024	1,704,011	▲12.09%	39,109	▲3.75%	79,576	▲0.96%
2025	1,927,498	▲13.11%	30,398	▼22.27%	81,748	▲2.73%

=== Top destinations ===
Busiest domestic routes at TLC (Jan–Dec 2025)
Rank	City	Passengers
1	Monterrey, Nuevo León	280,140
2	Cancún, Quintana Roo	217,652
3	San José del Cabo, Baja California Sur	94,625
4	Puerto Vallarta, Jalisco	84,073
5	Mérida, Yucatán	73,862
6	Guadalajara, Jalisco	73,604
7	Tijuana, Baja California	59,384

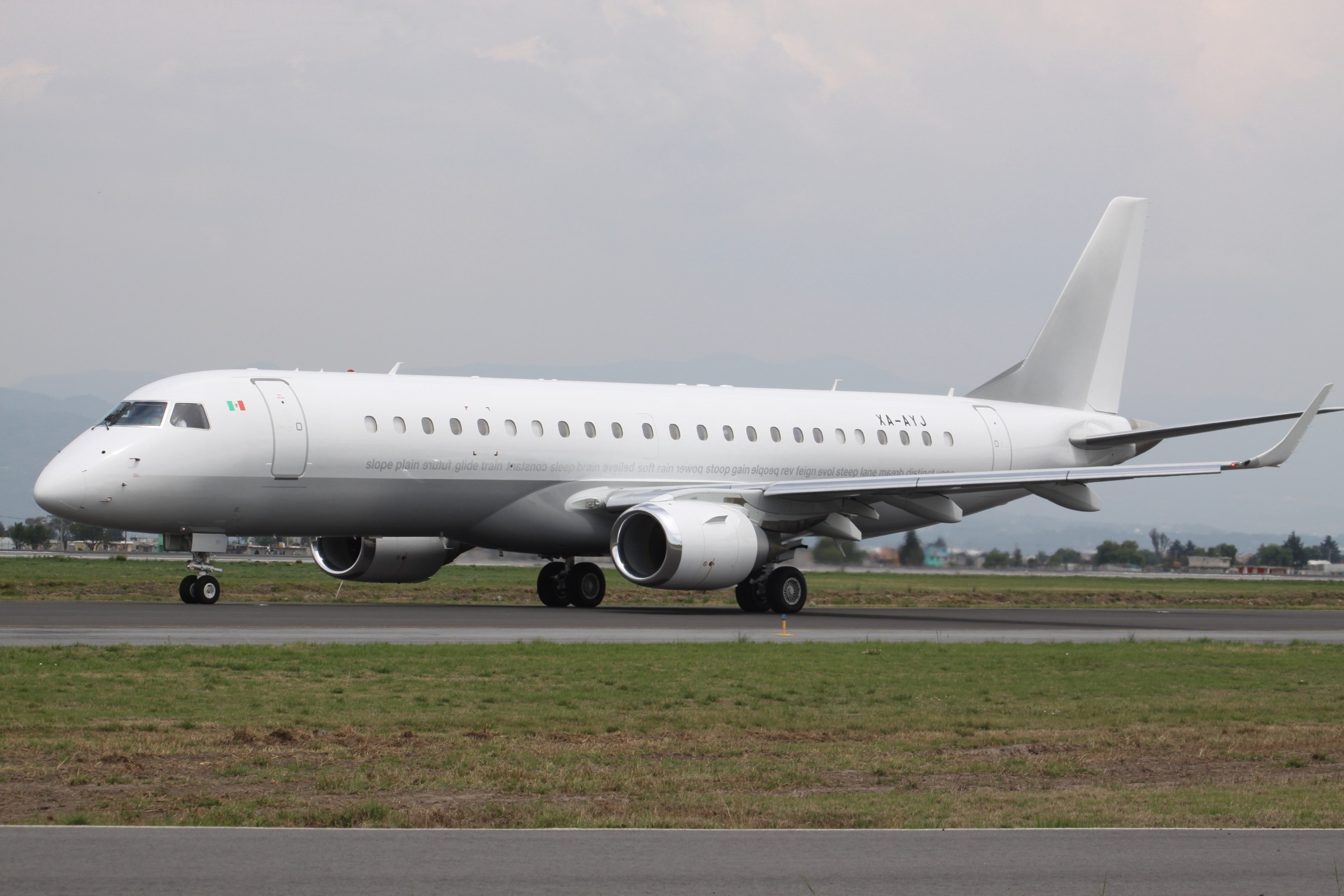
Embraer 190 Lineage XA-AYJ at TLC

== Ground transportation ==
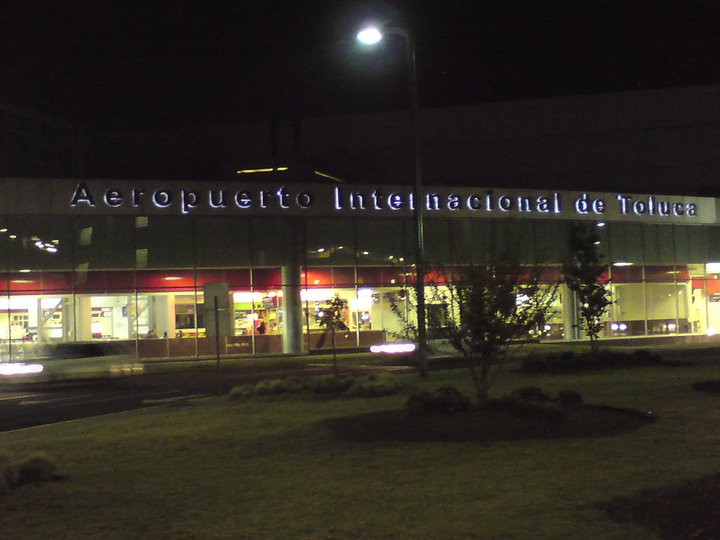
Facade of the terminal at night

The primary transportation to and from the airport is currently by road, with car rental and taxi services available. The airport lacks consistent public transport, private shuttles, and bus services. However, a shuttle connecting to the Toluca-Mexico City train line El Insurgente is expected to start in 2024, connecting to the Metepec railway station and improving overall accessibility.

== Accidents and incidents ==
On 15 December 2025, a Cessna Citation III flying from Acapulco International Airport crashed 800 meters from the runway during an attempted emergency landing on a football pitch. The crash killed all 10 people on board the plane. The crash started a large fire, which caused the evacuation of around 130 people in the area.

== See also ==
- List of the busiest airports in Mexico
- List of airports in Mexico
- List of airports by ICAO code: M
- List of busiest airports in North America
- List of the busiest airports in Latin America
- Transportation in Mexico
- Tourism in Mexico
- Grupo Aeroportuario del Pacífico
- List of beaches in Mexico
- Transport in Mexico City
- Greater Mexico City
- Mexico City International Airport
