= Torreón International Airport =

International airport in Torreón, Coahuila, Mexico

Torreón International Airport Aeropuerto Internacional de Torreón
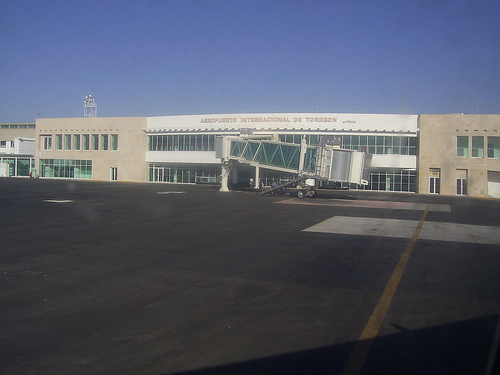
- IATA: TRC; ICAO: MMTC

Summary
- Airport type: Military/public
- Operator: Grupo Aeroportuario Centro Norte
- Serves: La Laguna, e.g.:Torreón, Coahuila, Gómez Palacio, Durango
- Location: Torreón, Coahuila, Mexico
- Time zone: CST (UTC−06:00)
- Elevation AMSL: 1,124 m (3,688 ft)
- Coordinates: 25°34′05″N 103°24′38″W
- Website: www.oma.aero/en/passengers/torreon/

Map
- Location of the airport in Coahuila TRC (Mexico)

Runways
Direction	Length		Surface
Direction	m	ft	Surface
08/26	1,467	4,813	Asphalt
13/31	2,755	9,039	Asphalt

Statistics (2025)
- Total passengers: 842,608
- Ranking in Mexico: 29th ▲1
- Source: Grupo Aeroportuario Centro Norte

Torreón International Airport or Torreón/Gómez Palacio International Airport (Spanish: Aeropuerto Internacional de Torreón); officially Aeropuerto Internacional De Torreón Francisco Sarabia (Francisco Sarabia International Airport) (IATA: TRC, ICAO: MMTC), is an international airport located in Torreón, Coahuila, Mexico. It handles the national and international air traffic of the La Laguna Metropolitan Area, which includes Torreón, Coahuila, and the cities of Gómez Palacio and Lerdo in Durango.

The airport also supports a variety of tourism, flight training, executive and general aviation activities. Grupo Aeroportuario Centro Norte (OMA) is the operator of the airport, and it was named in honor of Francisco Sarabia, a pioneer of commercial aviation in Mexico. In 2024, the airport served 813,226 passengers and 842,608 in 2025.

== Facilities ==
The airport is situated within the Torreón urban area, 6.5 kilometres (4.0 mi) to the east of the city center, at an elevation of 1,124 metres (3,688 ft) above sea level. The passenger terminal offers a range of services typical of a regional airport, including check-in facilities for both domestic and international flights, VIP lounges, parking areas, car rental services, taxi stands, and a departure concourse with 2 gates, one of which is equipped with a jet bridge. The terminal underwent renovations in both 2003 and 2023. The apron has 7 stands capable of accommodating narrow-body aircraft.

Torreón Airport features two runways. The main runway, Runway 13/31, is 2,755 metres (9,039 ft) in length, while Runway 08/26 is 1,467 metres (4,813 ft) long and is primarily used for smaller aircraft.

Additionally, the Mexican Air Force's Air Force Station No. 3 (Spanish: Estación Aérea Militar N.º 3) (E.A.M. No. 3) is located at Torreón Airport. It currently does not have any active squadrons assigned to it. The station includes an aviation platform of 5,400 square metres (58,000 sq ft), 1 hangar, and other facilities for accommodating Air Force personnel.

== Airlines and destinations ==
=== Passengers ===
Airlines	Destinations
Aeroméxico	Mexico City–Benito Juárez
Aeroméxico Connect	Mexico City–Benito Juárez
American Eagle	Dallas/Fort Worth
TAR México	Chihuahua, Ciudad Juárez, Mazatlán, Monterrey, Querétaro
Viva	Cancún, Mexico City–Benito Juárez, Mexico City–Felipe Ángeles, San José del Cabo; Seasonal: San Antonio
Volaris	Guadalajara, Tijuana

=== Cargo ===
Airlines	Destinations
Aeronaves TSM	Culiacán, Querétaro
TUM AeroCarga	Chihuahua, Ciudad Juárez, Toluca/Mexico City

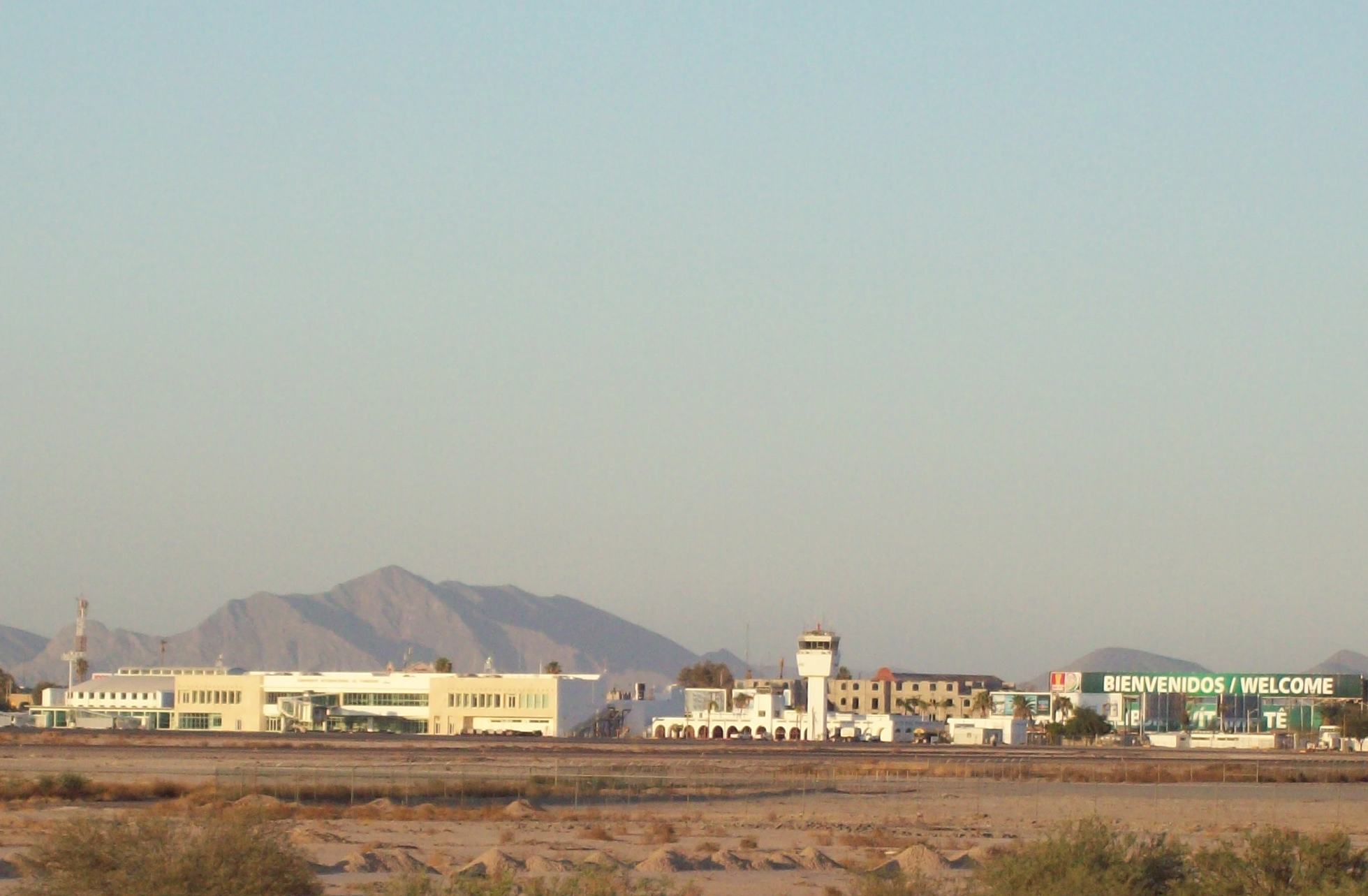
Passenger terminal and control tower

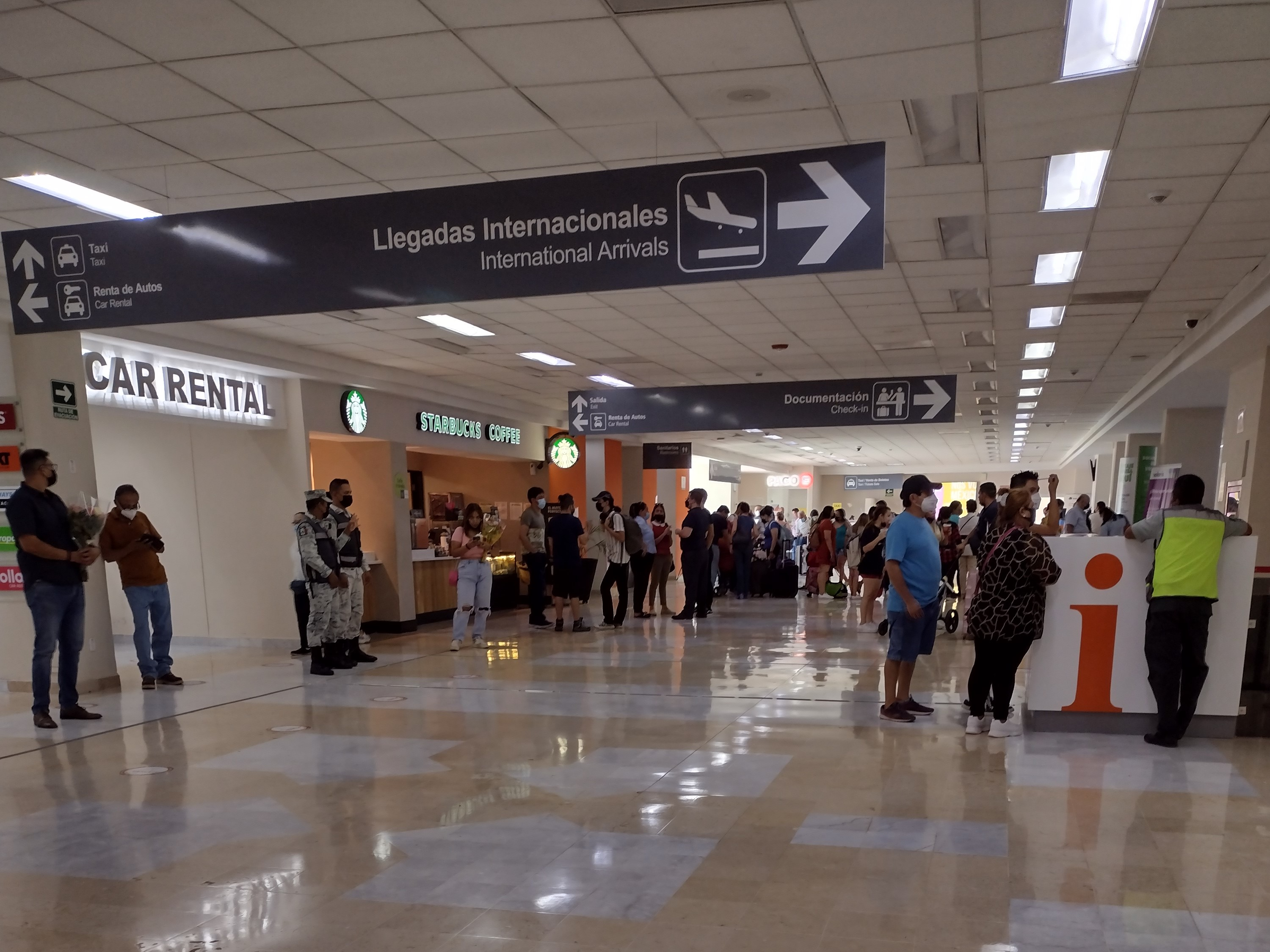
Arrivals hall

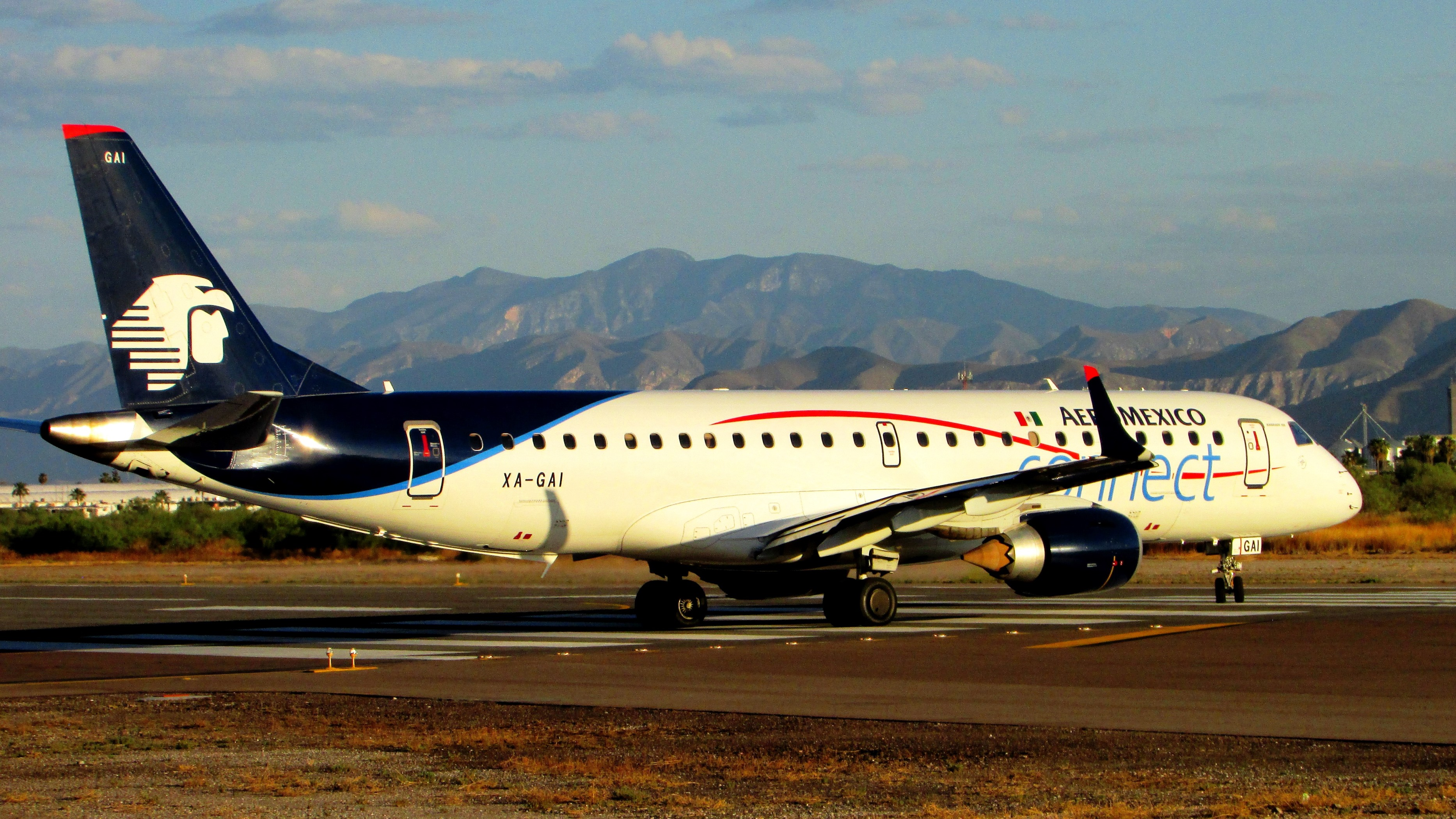
Aeromexico Connect Embraer E190 at TRC

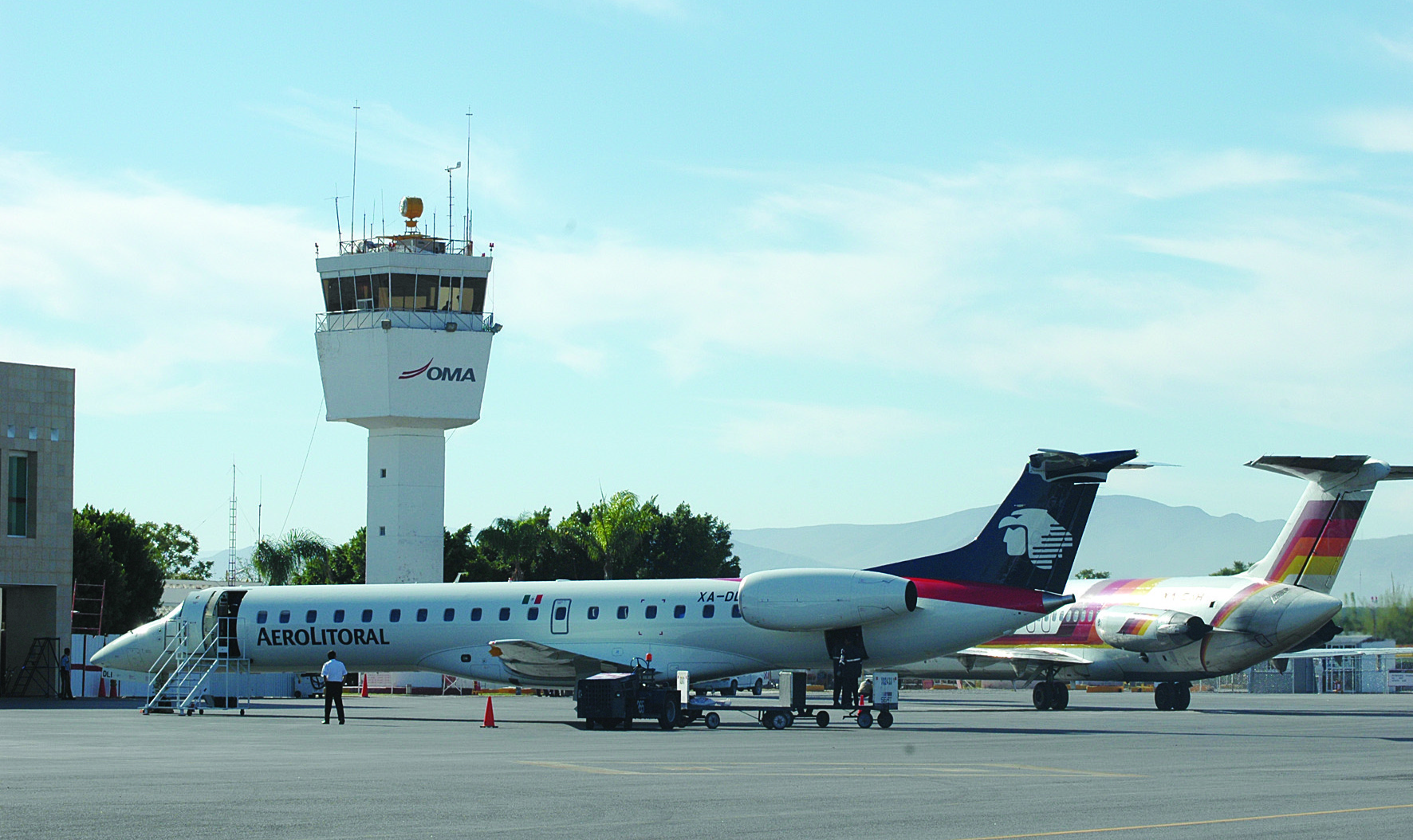
Aeromexico Embraer ERJ-145 at TRC

=== Destination maps ===
Domestic destinations from Torreón International Airport
Red = Year-round destination
Blue = Future destination
Green = Seasonal destination
International destinations from Torreón International Airport
Red = Year-round destination
Blue = Future destination
Green = Seasonal/charter destination

== Statistics ==
=== Annual Traffic ===
Passenger statistics at TRC
Year	Total Passengers	change %
2009	394,377	Steady
2010	338,003	▼14.3%
2011	375,669	▲11.1%
2012	415,244	▲10.5%
2013	467,398	▲12.6%
2014	523,783	▲12.1%
2015	556,449	▲6.2%
2016	646,898	▲16.3%
2017	618,930	▼4.3%
2018	681,551	▲10.1%
2019	708,563	▲3.96%
2020	320,820	▼54.7%
2021	537,161	▲67.4%
2022	670,245	▲24.8%
2023	776,462	▲15.8%
2024	813,226	▲4.7%
2025	842,608	▲3.6%

=== Busiest routes ===
Busiest routes from TRC (Jan–Dec 2025)
Rank	Airport	Passengers
1	Mexico City, Mexico City	247,691
2	Guadalajara, Jalisco	52,288
3	Dallas/Fort Worth, United States	40,079
4	Tijuana, Baja California	29,934
5	Cancún, Quintana Roo	17,665
6	San José del Cabo, Baja California Sur	14,061
7	Querétaro, Querétaro	4,943
8	Ciudad Juárez, Chihuahua	4,220
9	San Antonio, United States	994
10	Chihuahua, Chihuahua	159

== See also ==
- List of the busiest airports in Mexico
- List of airports in Mexico
- List of airports by ICAO code: M
- List of busiest airports in North America
- List of the busiest airports in Latin America
- Transportation in Mexico
- Tourism in Mexico
- Grupo Aeroportuario Centro Norte
- La Laguna Metropolitan Area
- Mexican Air Force
