= Ciudad Juárez International Airport =

International airport in Ciudad Juárez, Chihuahua, Mexico

Ciudad Juárez International Airport Aeropuerto Internacional de Ciudad Juárez
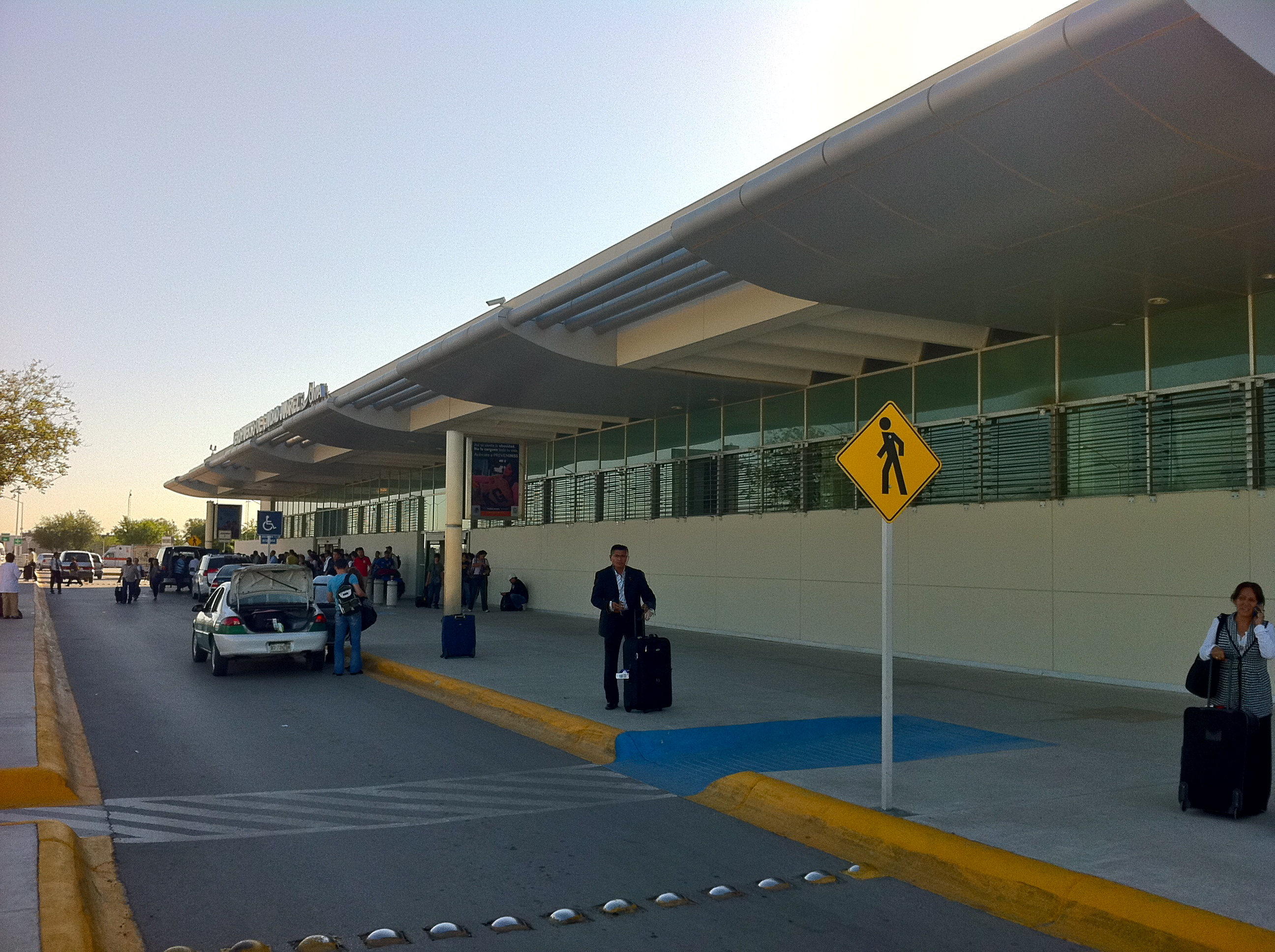
- IATA: CJS; ICAO: MMCS

Summary
- Airport type: Public
- Operator: Grupo Aeroportuario Centro Norte
- Serves: El Paso-Juarez transborder agglomeration
- Location: Ciudad Juárez, Chihuahua, Mexico
- Time zone: MST (UTC−07:00)
  - Summer (DST): MDT (UTC−06:00)
- Elevation AMSL: 1,190 m (3,900 ft)
- Coordinates: 31°38′11″N 106°25′43″W
- Website: www.oma.aero/en/airports/ciudad-juarez/

Map
- Location of the airport in Chihuahua CJS (Mexico)

Runways
Direction	Length		Surface
Direction	m	ft	Surface
03/21	2,700	8,858	Asphalt
15/33	1,750	5,741	Asphalt

Statistics (2025)
- Total passengers: 2,132,786
- Ranking in Mexico: 14th ▼1
- Source: Grupo Aeroportuario Centro Norte

Ciudad Juárez International Airport (Spanish: Aeropuerto Internacional de Ciudad Juárez); officially Aeropuerto Internacional Abraham González (Abraham González International Airport) (IATA: CJS, ICAO: MMCS) is an international airport located in Ciudad Juárez, Chihuahua, Mexico, near the Mexico–United States border. It serves the Metropolitan Area of Ciudad Juárez and the El Paso-Juárez agglomeration. The airport serves multiple domestic destinations and also supports cargo flights, flight training, and general aviation activities. It is named after Abraham González, a former Governor of the State of Chihuahua.

It ranks as the twelfth-busiest airport in Mexico in terms of passenger traffic. In 2022, the airport handled 2,004,524 passengers, surpassing the 2-million threshold in a calendar year for the first time; and in 2024, it served 2,145,418 passengers, and 2,132,786 passengers in 2025 according to its operator, Grupo Aeroportuario Centro Norte.

== Facilities ==
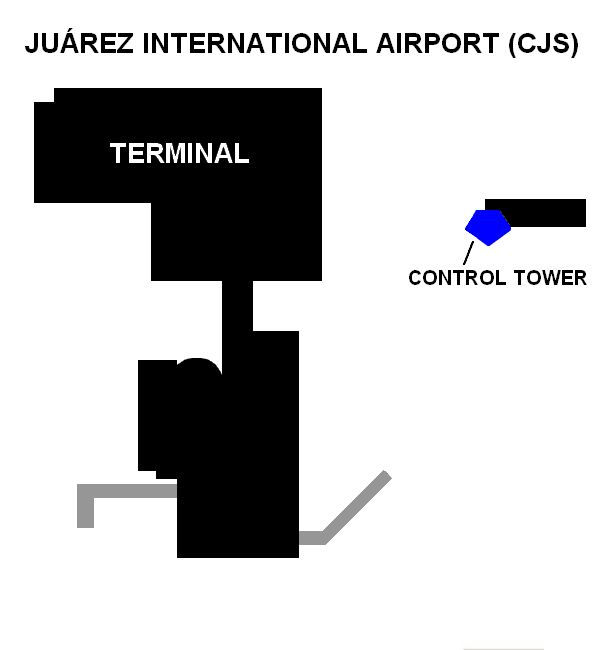
Terminal map

The airport is located within the El Paso-Juárez urban area, situated 12 kilometres (7.5 mi) to the southeast of Ciudad Juárez's city center. The airport sits at an elevation of 1,190 metres (3,900 ft) above mean sea level. Ciudad Juarez Airport features two runways. The primary runway, 03/21, is 2,700 metres (8,900 ft) in length, while Runway 15/33 is 1,750 metres (5,740 ft) long and primarily used for smaller aircraft. The apron features 7 stands capable of accommodating narrow-body aircraft.

The passenger terminal covers an area of 15,480 square metres (166,600 sq ft) and offers a range of services typical of a regional airport. These include check-in facilities for both domestic and international flights, a VIP lounge, parking areas, car rental services, taxi stands, and a departure concourse with 3 gates: A, B, and C. The terminal underwent renovations in 2003, and in 2021, a new expansion project began, with plans for completion in 2025. It is expected that the airport will have seven gates for aircraft, with four on the lower level and three on the upper level.

Ciudad Juárez Airport accommodates logistics and courier companies and features a dedicated general aviation terminal that supports various activities such as tourism, flight training, executive aviation, and general aviation.

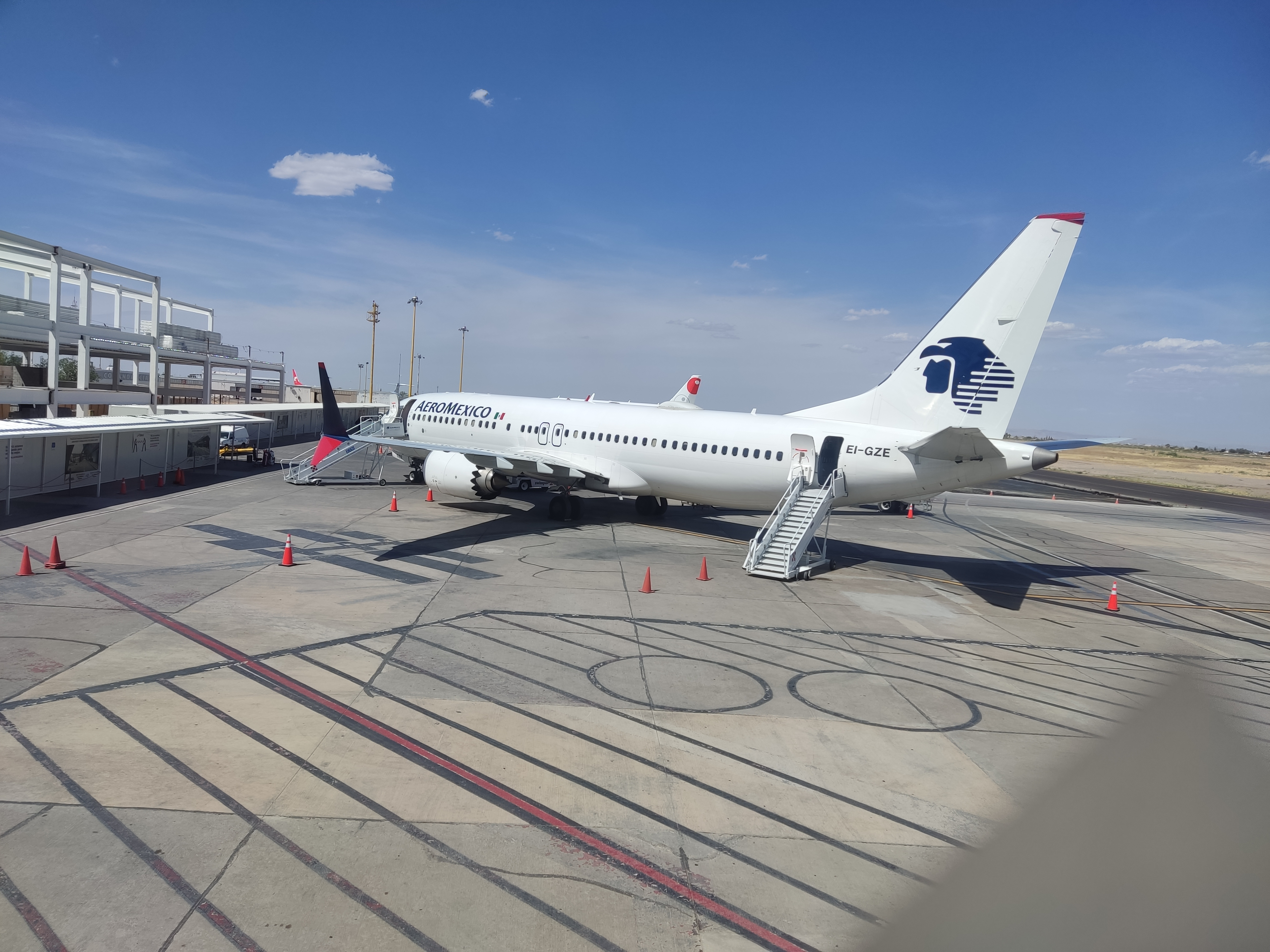
Aeromexico B737-8 MAX (EI-GZE) at CJS

The airport's proximity to the U.S. border makes it an attractive choice for cross-border travelers heading to Mexican cities. However, due to its close proximity to El Paso and the high transportation taxes for international flights in Mexico, the airport only serves domestic destinations. Passengers traveling to destinations in the United States typically use the El Paso International Airport.

== Airlines and destinations ==
=== Passenger ===
Airlines	Destinations
Aeroméxico	Mexico City–Benito Juárez
Aeroméxico Connect	Mexico City–Benito Juárez
TAR México	Hermosillo, La Paz, Querétaro, Torreón/Gómez Palacio
Viva	Cancún, Guadalajara, Leon/Del Bajío, Mazatlán, Mexico City–Benito Juárez, Mexico City–Felipe Ángeles, Monterrey, Puerto Vallarta
Volaris	Guadalajara, Mexico City–Benito Juárez, Tijuana

=== Cargo ===
Airlines	Destinations
Estafeta	La Paz, San Luis Potosí
TUM AeroCarga	Monterrey, Toluca

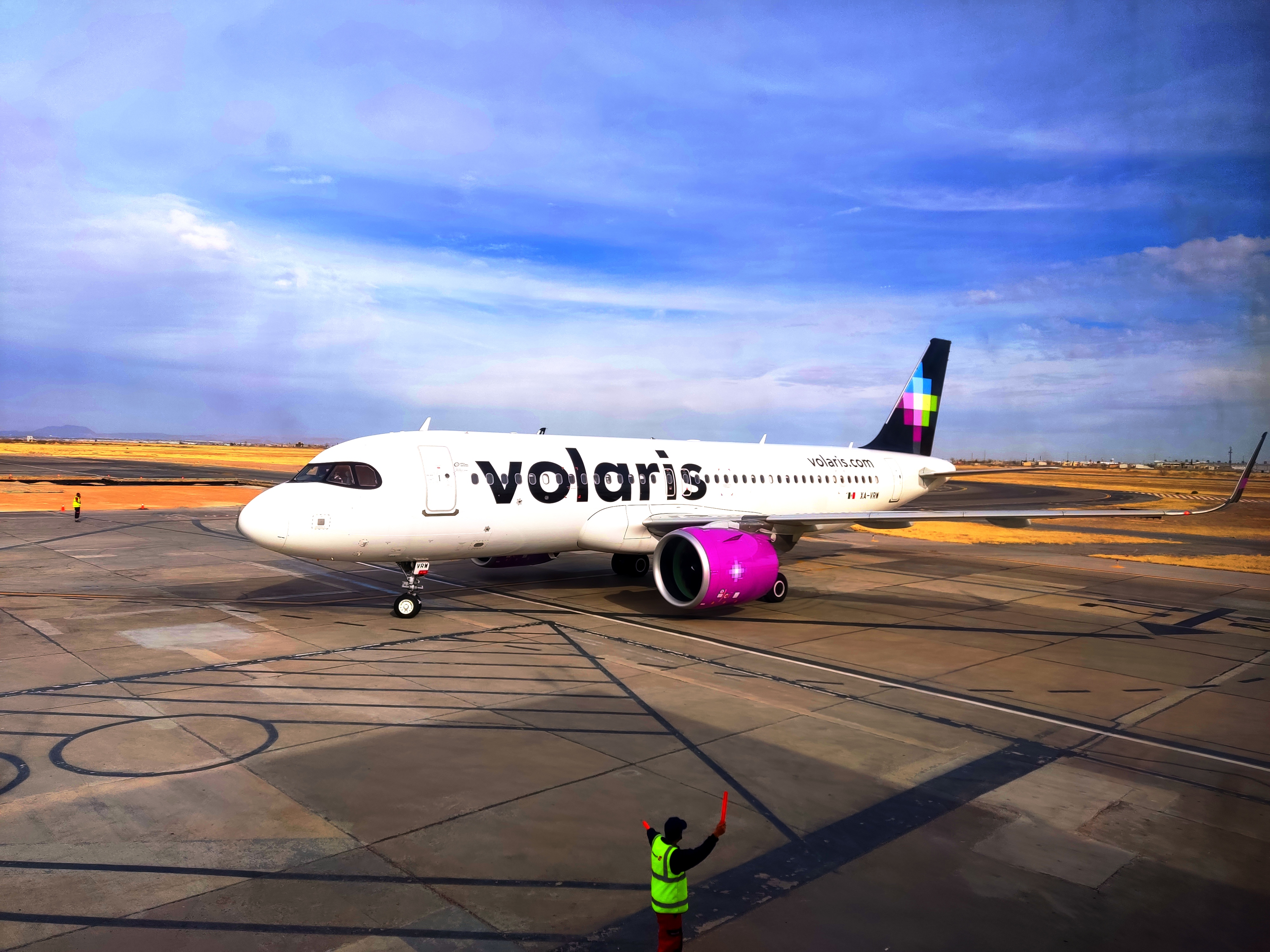
Volaris A320neo at CJS

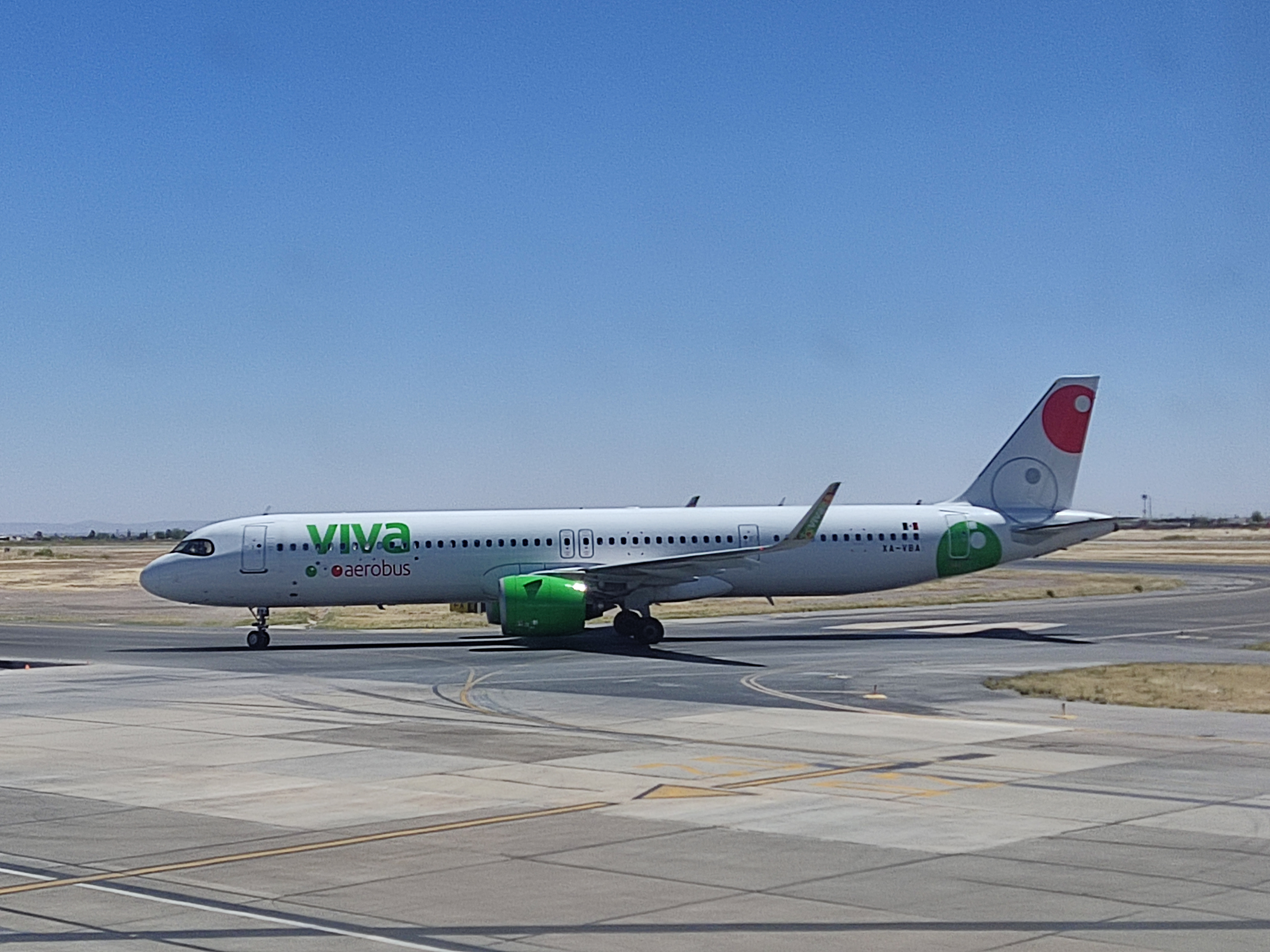
VivaAerobus A321neo at CJS

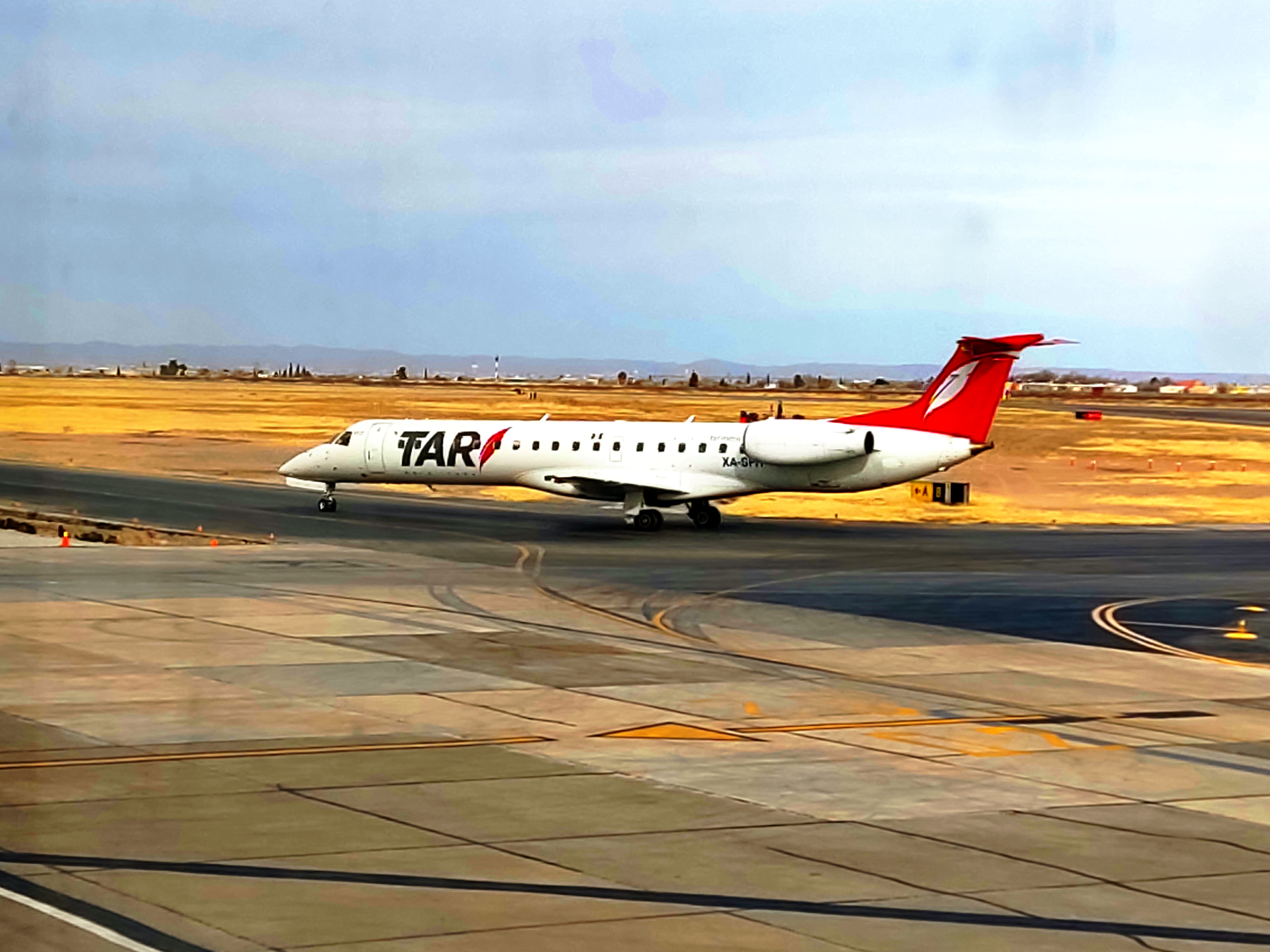
TAR Aerolineas ERJ-145LR (XA-SFH) at CJS

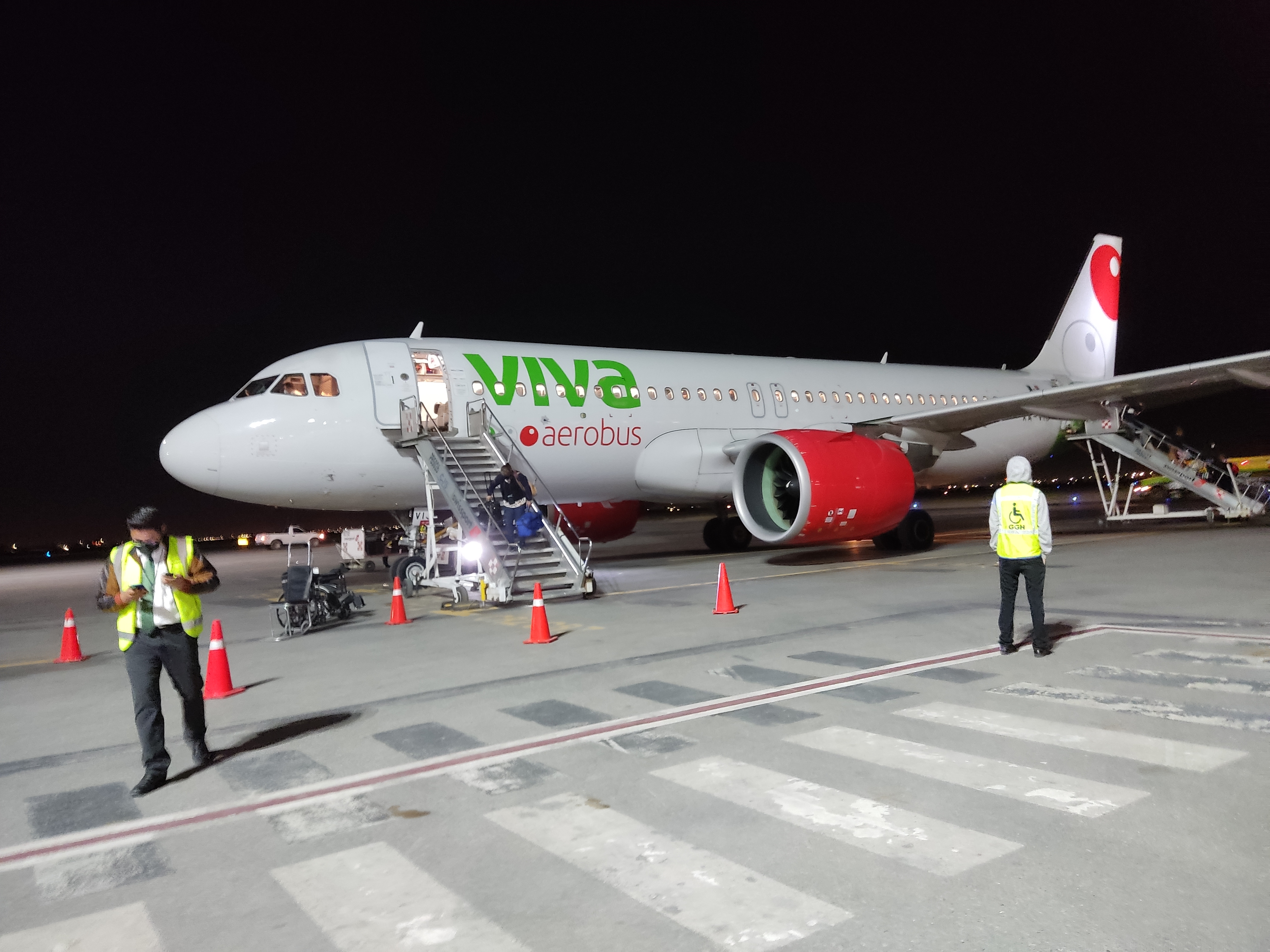
VivaAerobus A320neo at CJS

=== Destinations map ===
International destinations from Ciudad Juárez International Airport
Red = Year-round destination
Blue = Future destination
Green = Seasonal/charter destination

== Statistics ==
=== Annual Traffic ===
Passenger statistics at Ciudad Juárez International Airport
Year	Total Passengers	change %
2000	531,015	Steady
2001	553,793	▲4.29%
2002	524,393	▼5.30%
2003	549,476	▲4.79%
2004	570,923	▲3.90%
2005	611,942	▲7.18%
2006	698,765	▲14.16%
2007	908,835	▲30.04%
2008	903,129	▼0.63%
2009	631,111	▼30.13%
2010	633,919	▲0.45%
2011	673,364	▲6.23%
2012	699,394	▲3.87%
2013	702,904	▲0.50%
2014	769,029	▲9.40%
2015	863,760	▲12.31%
2016	1,102,855	▲27.64%
2017	1,173,135	▲6.36%
2018	1,364,028	▲12.1%
2019	1,597,471	▲17.11%
2020	790,009	▼50.5%
2021	1,499,841	▲89.9%
2022	2,004,524	▲33.6%
2023	2,275,153	▲13.5%
2024	2,145,418	▼5.7%
2025	2,132,786	▼0.6%

=== Busiest routes ===
Busiest domestic routes at CJS (Jan–Dec 2025)
Rank	Airport	Passengers
1	Mexico City, Mexico City	328,279
2	Guadalajara, Jalisco	205,767
3	Monterrey, Nuevo León	197,807
4	Cancún. Quintana Roo	70,979
5	Tijuana, Baja California	68,170
6	León/El Bajío, Guanajuato	53,441
7	Mexico City-AIFA, State of Mexico	36,279
8	Mazatlán, Sinaloa	16,442
9	Puerto Vallarta, Jalisco	18,329
10	Torreón/Gómez Palacio, Coahuila	4,200

== See also ==
- List of the busiest airports in Mexico
- List of airports in Mexico
- List of airports by ICAO code: M
- List of busiest airports in North America
- List of the busiest airports in Latin America
- Transportation in Mexico
- Tourism in Mexico
- Grupo Aeroportuario Centro Norte
- Mexican Air Force
- El Paso-Juárez
