= FlyMex =

IATA	ICAO	Call sign
-	NTG	-
- Fleet size: 1
- Destinations: charter
- Headquarters: Toluca, Mexico
- Website: flymex.aero

FlyMex, legally FlyMex, Servicios Integrales de Aviacion S.A. de C.V., is a charter airline based in Toluca, Mexico.

== Fleet ==
As of August 2025, FlyMex operates the following aircraft:

- 1 Embraer ERJ 145LR

The airline has also historically also operated the Dornier DO-328 and Embraer 135.

== Gallery ==
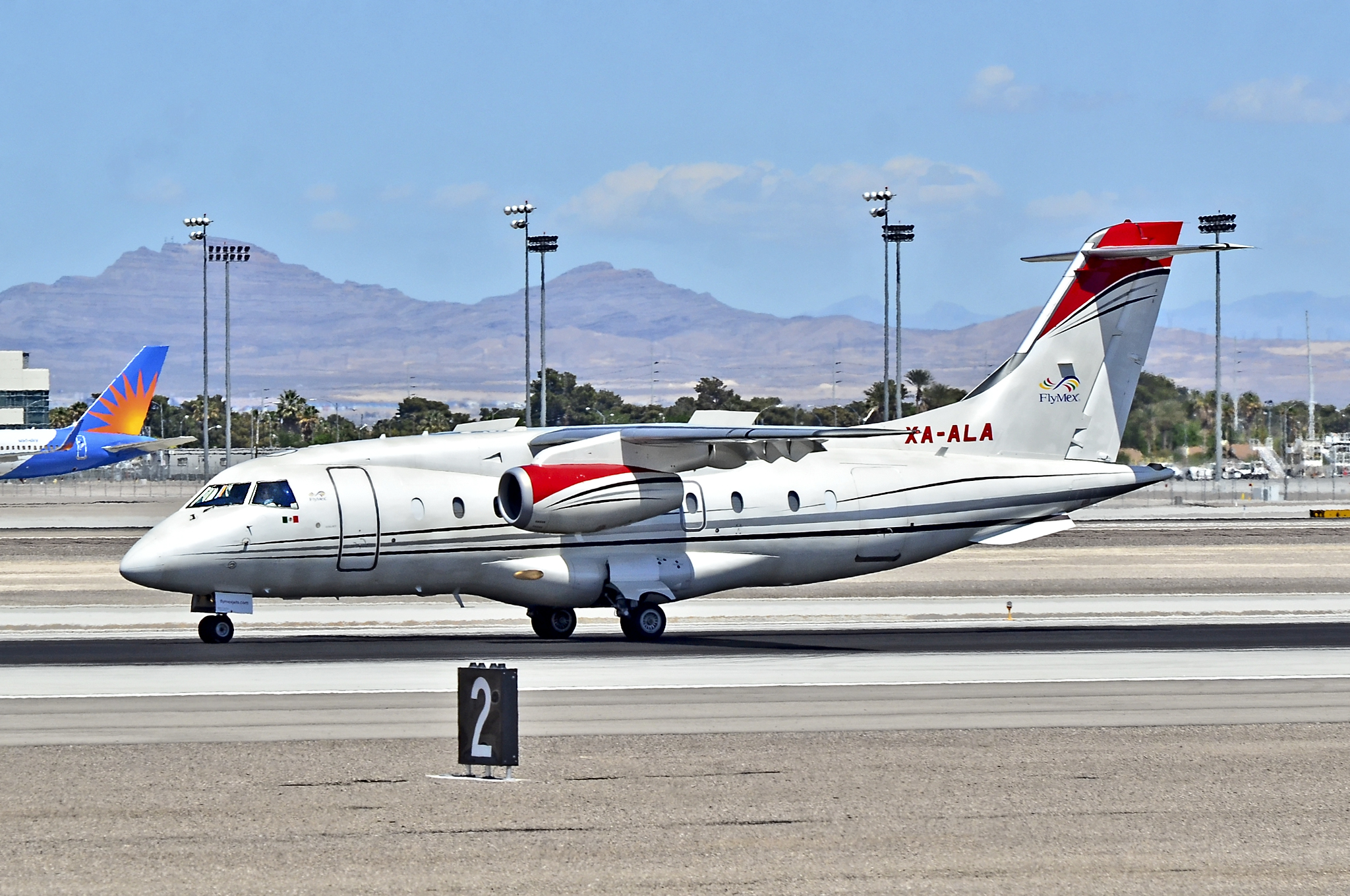
A FlyMex Fairchild Dornier 328-310 JET (XA-ALA) at McCarran International Airport

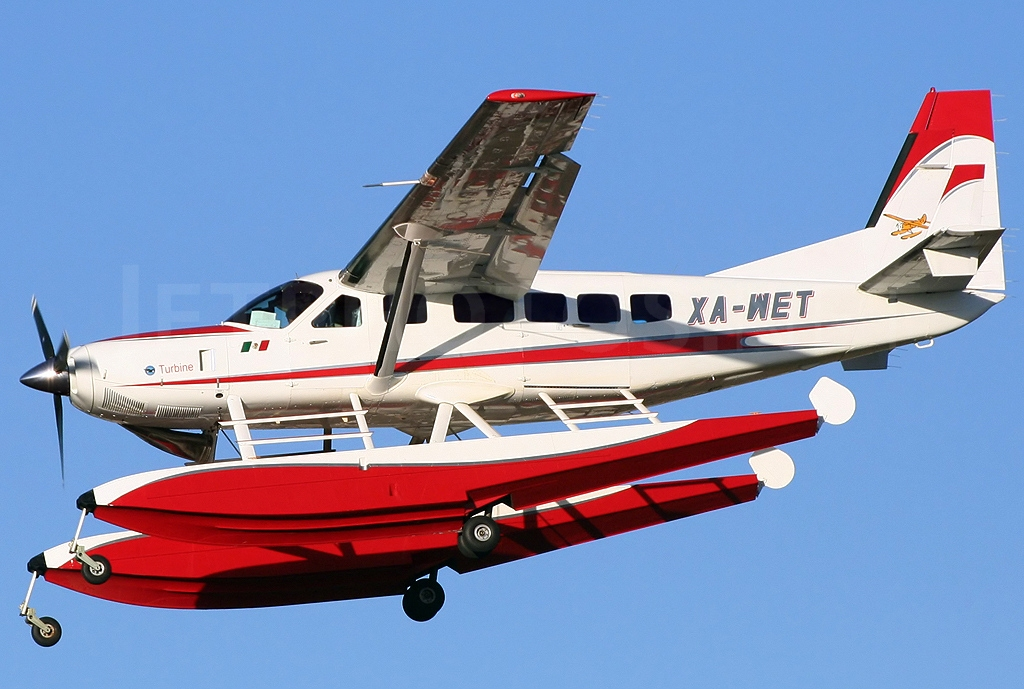
A Flymex Cessna 208 Caravan (XA-WET)

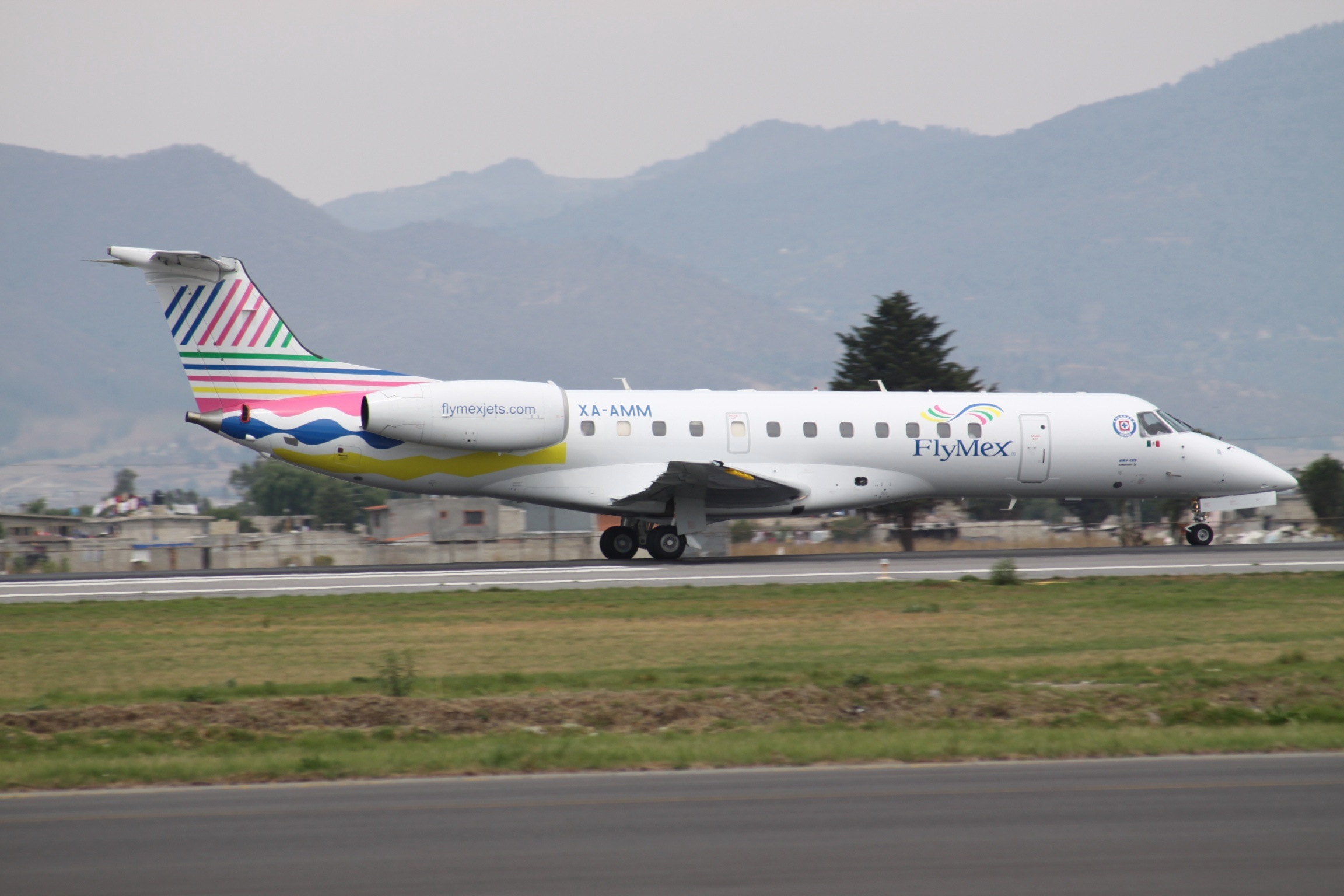
A FlyMex Embraer ERJ-135LR (XA-AMM) at Toluca International Airport

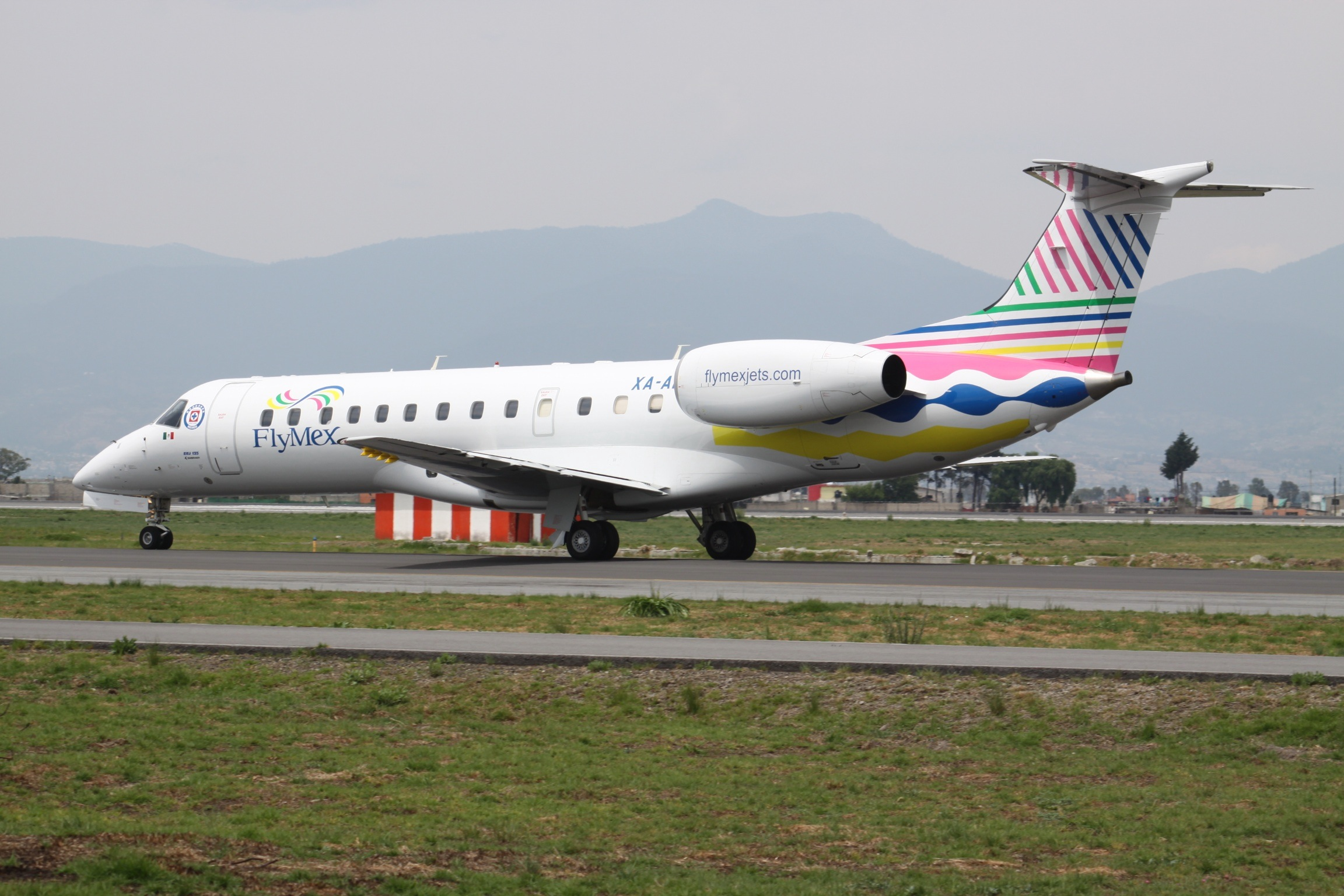
A FlyMex Embraer ERJ-135LR (XA-AMM) at Toluca International Airport

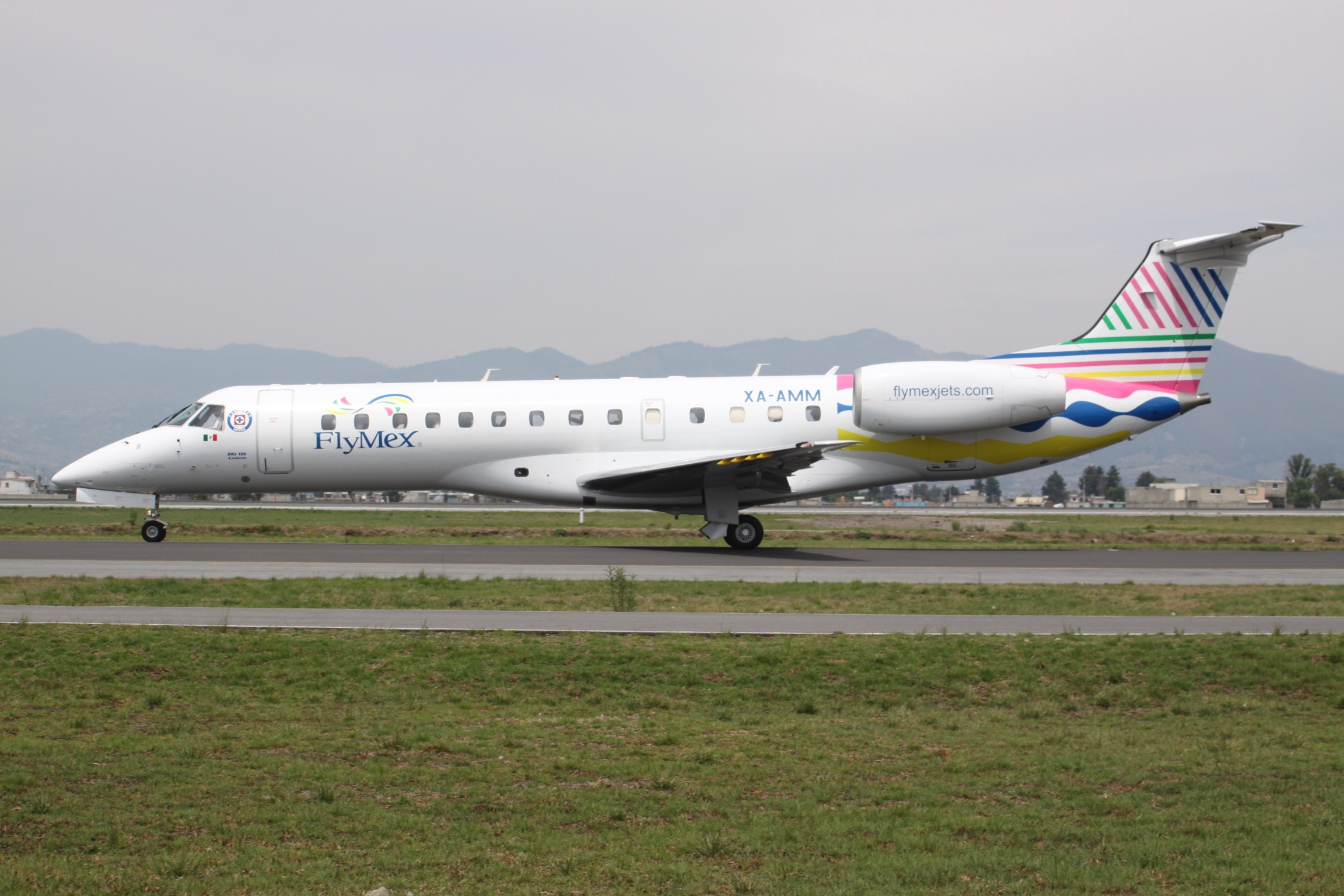
A FlyMex Embraer ERJ-135LR (XA-AMM) at Toluca International Airport

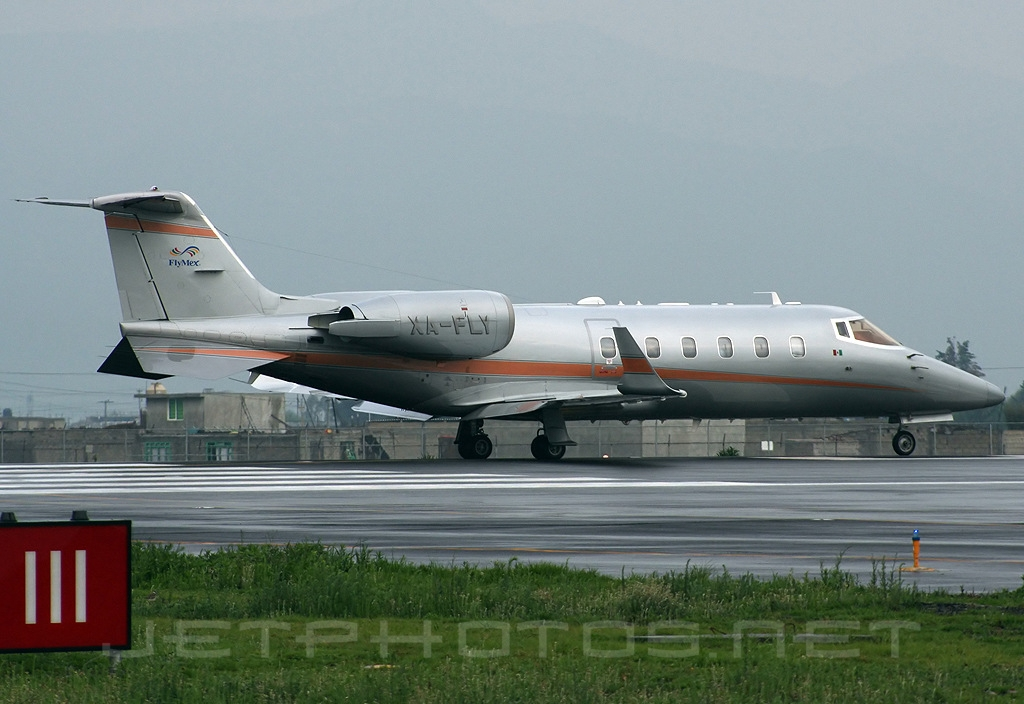
A FlyMex Learjet 60 (XA-FLY) at Toluca International Airport

== See also ==
- List of active mexican airlines
- Lists of airlines
