= Grupo Aeroportuario Centro Norte =

Mexican airport operating company

Grupo Aeroportuario del Centro Norte, S.A.B. de C.V.

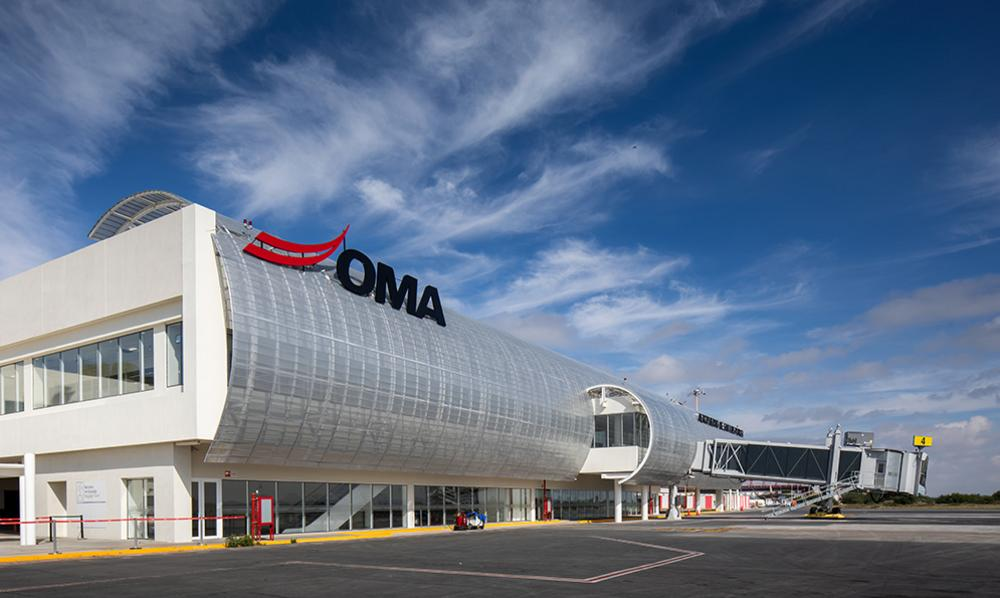
- Type: Public
- Traded as: BMV: OMA B Nasdaq: OMAB
- Industry: Airport Services
- Founded: November 1, 1998; 27 years ago
- Headquarters: Monterrey, Mexico
- Number of locations: 13 airports
- Area served: Center and North of Mexico
- Key people: Ricardo Duenas Espriu (CEO)
- Revenue: ▼US$ 809.1 million (2024)
- Net income: ▼US$ 264.1 million (2024)
- Total assets: ▼US$ 1,461,785.2 million (2024)
- Number of employees: 1,326
- Website: oma.aero/en/
- Footnotes; Source: Annual Report

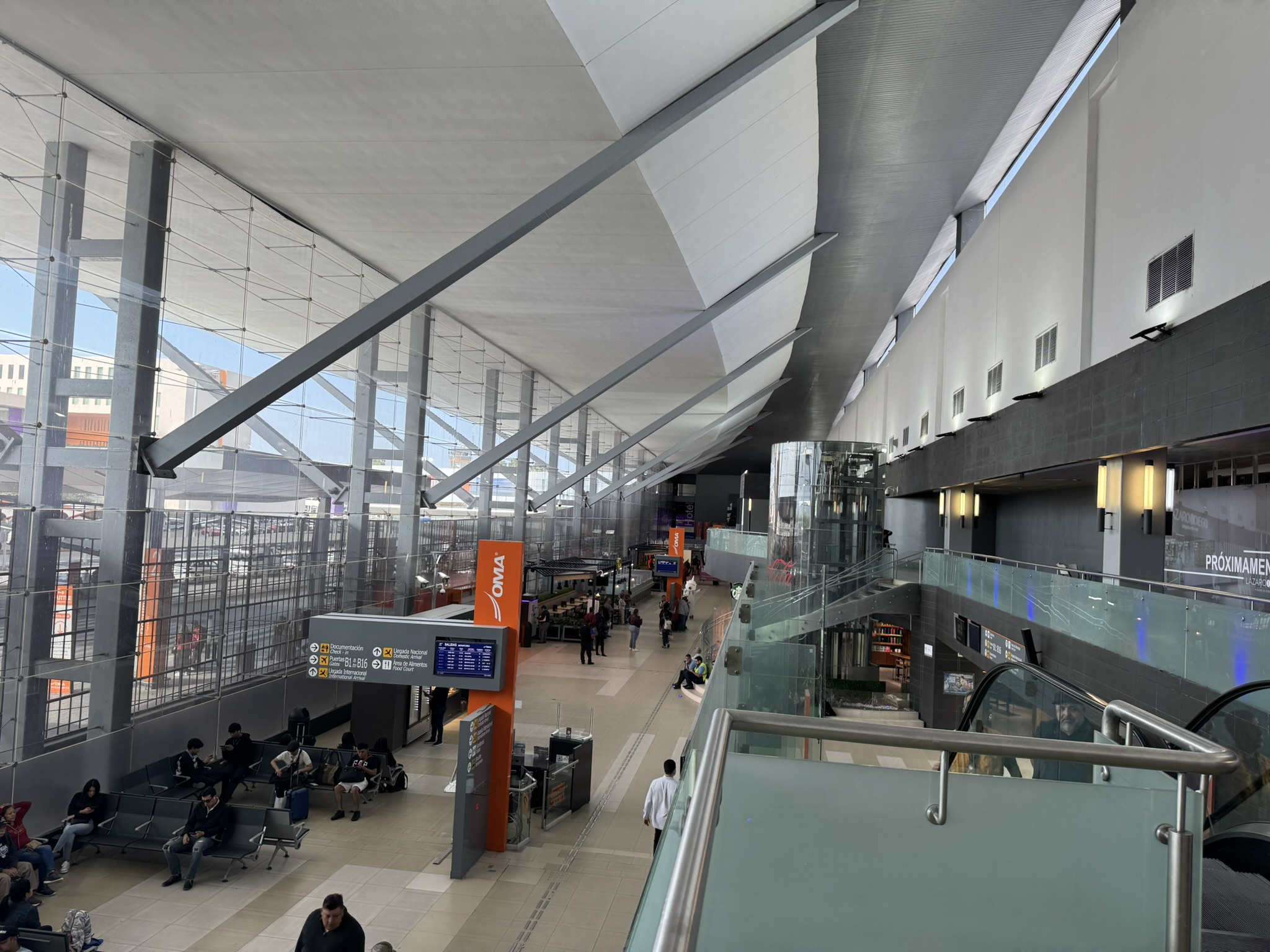
Monterrey International Airport Terminal B

Grupo Aeroportuario Centro Norte, S.A.B. de C.V., known as OMA, is a Mexican airport operator headquartered in San Pedro, near Monterrey, Mexico. It operates 13 airports in the central and northern states of Mexico, including that of Monterrey, one of Mexico's largest cities. It is the fourth largest airport services company by passenger traffic in Mexico. It serves approximately 15 million passengers annually.

OMA is listed on the Mexican Stock Exchange and in the NASDAQ through ADRs since 2006. In June 2015, OMA announced it had engaged UBS as market maker to promote the liquidity and trading volume for the shares listed on the Mexican Stock Exchange.

== Airports ==
=== Airports in Mexico ===
Airport	City	State	ICAO	IATA
Acapulco International Airport	Acapulco	Guerrero	MMAA	ACA
Chihuahua International Airport	Chihuahua	Chihuahua	MMCU	CUU
Ciudad Juárez International Airport	Ciudad Juárez	Chihuahua	MMCS	CJS
Culiacán International Airport	Culiacán	Sinaloa	MMCL	CUL
Durango International Airport	Durango	Durango	MMDO	DGO
Ixtapa-Zihuatanejo International Airport	Ixtapa-Zihuatanejo	Guerrero	MMZH	ZIH
Mazatlán International Airport	Mazatlán	Sinaloa	MMMZ	MZT
Monterrey International Airport	Monterrey	Nuevo León	MMMY	MTY
General Lucio Blanco International Airport	Reynosa	Tamaulipas	MMRX	REX
San Luis Potosí International Airport	San Luis Potosí	San Luis Potosí	MMSP	SLP
Tampico International Airport	Tampico	Tamaulipas	MMTM	TAM
Torreón International Airport	Torreón	Coahuila	MMTC	TRC
Zacatecas International Airport	Zacatecas	Zacatecas	MMZC	ZCL

=== Map ===
Airports operated by OMA
Purple = Major airports (over 5 million passengers)
Red = International and domestic service
Green = Domestic service only

=== Passenger numbers ===
Number of passengers at each airport by 2025:

Number	Airport	City	State	Passengers
1	Monterrey International Airport	Monterrey	Nuevo León	15,623,275
2	Culiacán International Airport	Culiacán	Sinaloa	2,162,362
3	Ciudad Juárez International Airport	Ciudad Juárez	Chihuahua	2,132,786
4	Chihuahua International Airport	Chihuahua	Chihuahua	1,956,463
5	Mazatlán International Airport	Mazatlán	Sinaloa	1,736,208
6	Torreón International Airport	Torreón	Coahuila	842,608
7	San Luis Potosí International Airport	San Luis Potosí	San Luis Potosí	834,795
8	Ixtapa-Zihuatanejo International Airport	Ixtapa-Zihuatanejo	Guerrero	733,616
9	Acapulco International Airport	Acapulco	Guerrero	684,452
10	Tampico International Airport	Tampico	Tamaulipas	609,476
11	Durango International Airport	Durango	Durango	569,657
12	Reynosa International Airport	Reynosa	Tamaulipas	441,178
13	Zacatecas International Airport	Zacatecas	Zacatecas	423,818
Total				28,750,694

== Statistics ==
Annual sum of passengers from OMA airports.

Year	Passengers	Change %
2005	10 598 661	▲8.8%
2006	11 783 593	▲11.1%
2007	14 212 481	▲20.6%
2008	14 060 663	▲1.0%
2009	11 518 288	▼18.0%
2010	11 587 688	▲0.60%
2011	11 772 584	▲1.5%
2012	12 594 369	▲6.98%
2013	13 292 473	▲5.54%
2014	14 694 935	▲10.6%
2015	16 922 143	▲15.2%
2016	18 763 638	▲9.9%
2017	19 662 014	▲4.8%
2018	21 566 399	▲8.8%
2019	23 168 060	▲7.4%
2020	11 062 688	▼52.3%
2021	18 025 164	▲62.9%
2022	23 220 746	▲28.8%
2023	26 845 451	▲15.6%
2024	26 510 498	▼1.2%
2025	28 750 694	▲8.5%

== See also ==
- List of airports in Mexico
- List of the busiest airports in Mexico
- Busiest airports in North America
- Busiest airports in Latin America
- Airfields in Baja California
- Airfields in Baja California Sur
- Small airstrips
- Military bases
- Air Force bases
- Naval air bases
- Lists of airports
- International airports
- Defunct airports
- Airports by ICAO code
- Airlines of Mexico
- Airline hubs
- Airline destinations
- Transportation in Mexico
- Tourism in Mexico
- Federal Civil Aviation Agency
- Grupo Aeroportuario del Sureste
- Grupo Aeroportuario del Pacífico
- Grupo Aeroportuario del Centro Norte
- Aeropuertos y Servicios Auxiliares
- List of busiest airports by passenger traffic
- Metropolitan areas of Mexico
