= Republicair =

IATA	ICAO	Call sign
-	RBC	REPUBLICAIR
- Founded: 2005; 21 years ago
- Ceased operations: 2009; 17 years ago
- Hubs: Toluca International Airport
- Secondary hubs: Mexico City International Airport
- Fleet size: 11
- Destinations: North and South America
- Parent company: Republicair SA de CV
- Headquarters: Toluca, Mexico
- Website: republicair.com.mx/index.html

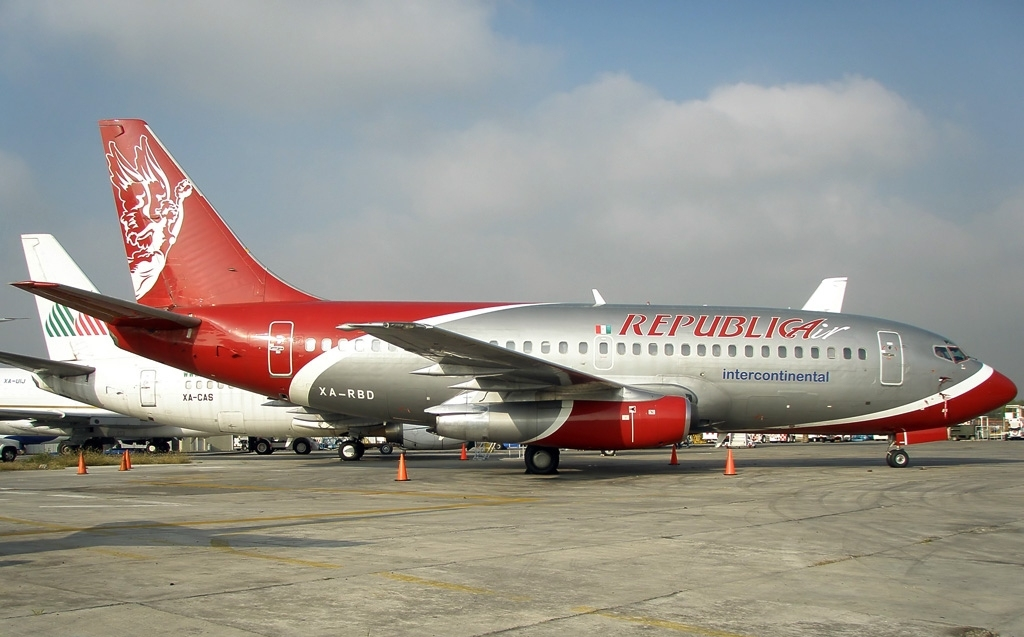
A Republicair Boeing 737-277 (XA-RBD) at Mexico City International Airport.

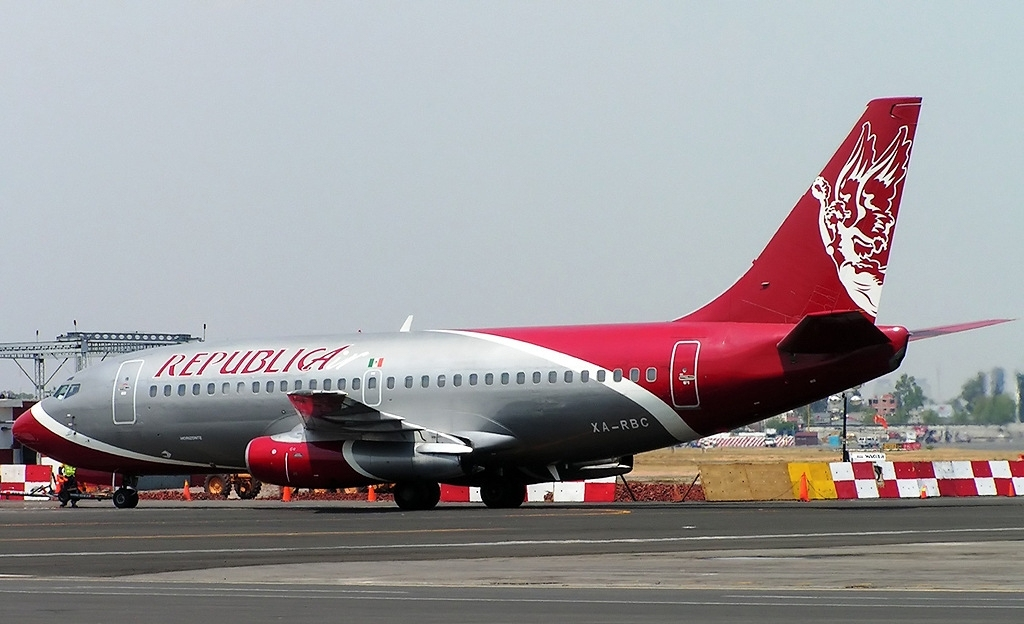
A Republicair Boeing 737-277 (XA-RBC) at Mexico City International Airport.

RepublicAir was a Mexican airline founded in 2004. It is based at Toluca International Airport, in the city of Toluca, Mexico. Republicair was banned from its operations by DGAC in April 2007, but as of July 2007 they returned and restarted operations with a single Boeing 737-200

== Services ==
Charter flights for groups, incentives and congresses. Scheduled flights started on December 15, 2006 to the following destinations:

- Tapachula
- Tepic
- Tijuana

and also charter flights to:

- Guatemala City, Guatemala

and other destinations in Central America.

== Fleet ==
The Republicair main flightline fleet included the following aircraft (as of 8 November 2008) :

- 1 Airbus A320
- 3 Boeing 737-200
- 3 Boeing 737-300
- 3 Boeing 737-400
- 1 MD-83 (in white livery, does not appear in the airline website)

Other aircraft in the fleet include business aircraft, air taxi aircraft and helicopters.
