= Nuevo Laredo International Airport =

International airport in Nuevo Laredo, Tamaulipas, Mexico

Nuevo Laredo International Airport Aeropuerto Internacional de Nuevo Laredo
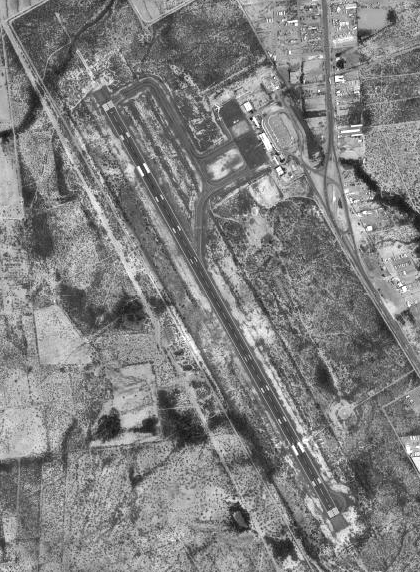
- IATA: NLD; ICAO: MMNL

Summary
- Airport type: Public
- Operator: Grupo Olmeca-Maya-Mexica
- Serves: Laredo–Nuevo Laredo
- Location: Nuevo Laredo, Tamaulipas, Mexico
- Time zone: CST (UTC-06:00)
  - Summer (DST): CDT (UTC-05:00)
- Elevation AMSL: 148 m (486 ft)
- Coordinates: 27°26′38″N 099°34′14″W
- Website: www.grupomundomaya.com/NLD

Map
- Location of airport in Tamaulipas NLD (Mexico)

Runways
Direction	Length		Surface
Direction	m	ft	Surface
14/32	2,000	6,562	Asphalt

Statistics (2025)
- Total passengers: 167,165
- Ranking in Mexico: 49th ▲1
- Source: Agencia Federal de Aviación Civil

Nuevo Laredo International Airport (Spanish: Aeropuerto Internacional de Nuevo Laredo); officially Aeropuerto Internacional Quetzalcóatl (Nahuatl pronunciation: [ketsalˈkoːaːtɬ]) (Quetzalcóatl International Airport) (IATA: NLD, ICAO: MMNL) is an international airport located in Nuevo Laredo, Tamaulipas, Mexico, near the U.S.-Mexico border. It serves domestic flights within Mexico for the Laredo-Nuevo Laredo binational metropolitan area, the northern Tamaulipas and Nuevo León region and Southern Texas. It also supports various cargo operations, as well as executive and general aviation activities.

Operated by Grupo Olmeca-Maya-Mexica (GAFSACOMM), a holding company owned by the Mexican military, Nuevo Laredo Airport was named after Quetzalcóatl, a deity in Aztec and other Mesoamerican cultures. Historically, the airport was served by Mexicana, which operated flights to Mexico City and Guadalajara before ceasing operations in 2010. The airport handled 151,764 passengers in 2024, increasing to 167,165 in 2025.

== Facilities ==
The airport is situated at an elevation of 148 metres (486 ft) above mean sea level, covering an area of 235 hectares (580 acres). It features a single asphalt runway, designated as 05/23, measuring 2,000 metres (6,600 ft). The commercial aviation apron spans 13,500 square metres (145,000 sq ft), featuring three parking positions for narrow-body aircraft and additional stands for general aviation. Official operating hours are from 8:00 to 20:00.

The passenger terminal caters to both domestic arrivals and departures in a single-story building. It includes check-in areas, a security checkpoint, a baggage claim area, and an arrivals hall with car rental services, taxi stands, and several retail stores. The departures concourse includes three gates with direct access to the apron, allowing passengers to board their planes by walking to the aircraft. Adjacent facilities include parking areas, civil aviation hangars, administration offices, cargo facilities, and facilities for general aviation.

The airport's proximity to the U.S. border makes it an attractive choice for cross-border travelers heading to Mexican cities. However, due to its close proximity to Laredo and the high transportation taxes for international flights in Mexico, the airport only serves domestic destinations. Passengers traveling to destinations in the United States typically utilize nearby airports such as Laredo International Airport or the larger San Antonio International Airport.

== Airlines and destinations ==
=== Passenger ===
Airlines	Destinations
Aeroméxico Connect	Mexico City–Benito Juárez
Viva	Cancún (begins November 14, 2026), Mexico City–Felipe Ángeles, Tampico (begins November 14, 2026)

=== Destinations map ===
Destinations from Nuevo Laredo International Airport
Red = Year-round destination
Blue = Future destination
Green = Seasonal destination

== Statistics ==
=== Annual Traffic ===
Passenger statistics at Nuevo Laredo Airport
Year	Total Passengers	change %	Cargo movements (t)	Air operations
2006	103,940	Steady	483	4,663
2007	93,119	▼10.41%	476	4,279
2008	88,545	▼4.91%	428	3,826
2009	115,175	▲30.08%	352	4,571
2010	97,344	▼15.48%	511	4,788
2011	82,584	▼15.16%	443	4,807
2012	84,443	▲2.25%	395	4,833
2013	70,191	▼16.88%	255	3,227
2014	66,846	▼4.77%	333	2,902
2015	72,978	▲9.17%	264	2,825
2016	84,064	▲15.19%	272	3,177
2017	78,338	▼6.81%	286	2,857
2018	63,576	▼18.8%	158	2,530
2019	65,471	▲2.98%	140	2,853
2020	28,891	▼55.87%	64	2,121
2021	53,921	▲86.64%	82	2,746
2022	107,368	▲99.12%	16	2,551
2023	197,673	▲84.11%	31	3,116
2024	151,764	▼23.22%	2	2,856
2025	167,165	▲10.15%	0	2,253

== See also ==
- List of the busiest airports in Mexico
- List of airports in Mexico
- List of airports by ICAO code: M
- List of busiest airports in North America
- List of the busiest airports in Latin America
- Transportation in Mexico
- Tourism in Mexico
- Laredo-Nuevo Laredo
- Mexico–United States border
- Laredo International Airport
