= Mazatlán International Airport =

International airport in Mazatlán, Sinaloa, Mexico

Coordinates: 23°09′41″N 106°15′58″W

Rafael Buelna Mazatlán International Airport Aeropuerto Internacional de Mazatlán
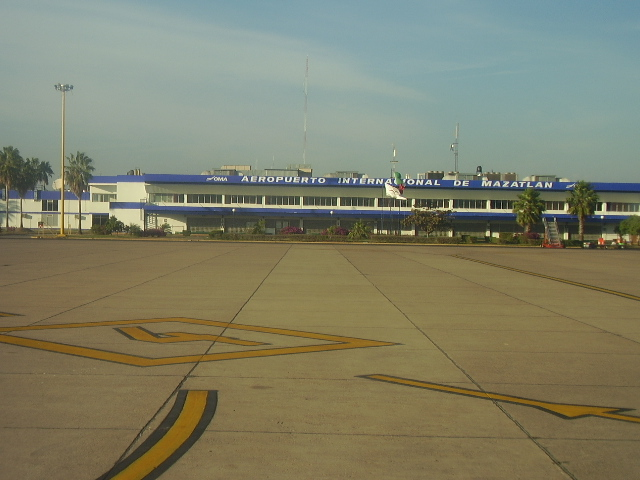
- IATA: MZT; ICAO: MMMZ

Summary
- Airport type: Public
- Owner/Operator: Grupo Aeroportuario Centro Norte
- Serves: Mazatlán, Sinaloa, Mexico
- Time zone: MST (UTC-07:00)
- Elevation AMSL: 12 m (39 ft)
- Website: www.oma.aero/en/passengers/mazatlan/

Map
- Location of the airport in Sinaloa } MZT (Mexico)

Runways
Direction	Length		Surface
Direction	m	ft	Surface
08/26	2,700	8,858	Asphalt

Statistics (2025)
- Total passengers: 1,736,208
- Ranking in Mexico: 19th ▼4
- Source: Grupo Aeroportuario Centro Norte

Mazatlán International Airport (Spanish: Aeropuerto Internacional de Mazatlán), officially Aeropuerto Internacional General Rafael Buelna (General Rafael Buelna International Airport; IATA: MZT, ICAO: MMMZ), is an international airport located in Mazatlán, Sinaloa, Mexico. It serves as the primary international gateway to Mazatlán, a popular Mexican tourist destination, offering flights to and from Mexico, the United States, and Canada. The airport also facilitates various tourism-related activities, flight training, and general aviation. Owned by Grupo Aeroportuario Centro Norte (OMA), it is named after Rafael Buelna, a military figure who played a significant role in the Mexican Revolution.

Mazatlán Airport is the busiest in Sinaloa for international passengers and ranks second to Culiacán International Airport for domestic operations. It serves as a gateway in a heavily traveled air corridor connecting mainland Mexico to the Baja California peninsula. In 2024, the airport handled 1,868,817 passengers, and this number decreased to 1,736,208 in 2024, according to OMA.

== Facilities ==
The airport is situated 16 kilometres (9.9 mi) southeast of Mazatlán, with an elevation of 12 metres (39 ft) above mean sea level. It has a single runway, designated as 08/26, which is 2,700 metres (8,900 ft) long and surfaced with asphalt. The commercial aviation apron features ten parking positions intended for narrow-body aircraft, located around two terminal satellites. Additionally, the general aviation apron provides parking spaces and heliports for private aviation.

=== Passenger terminal ===
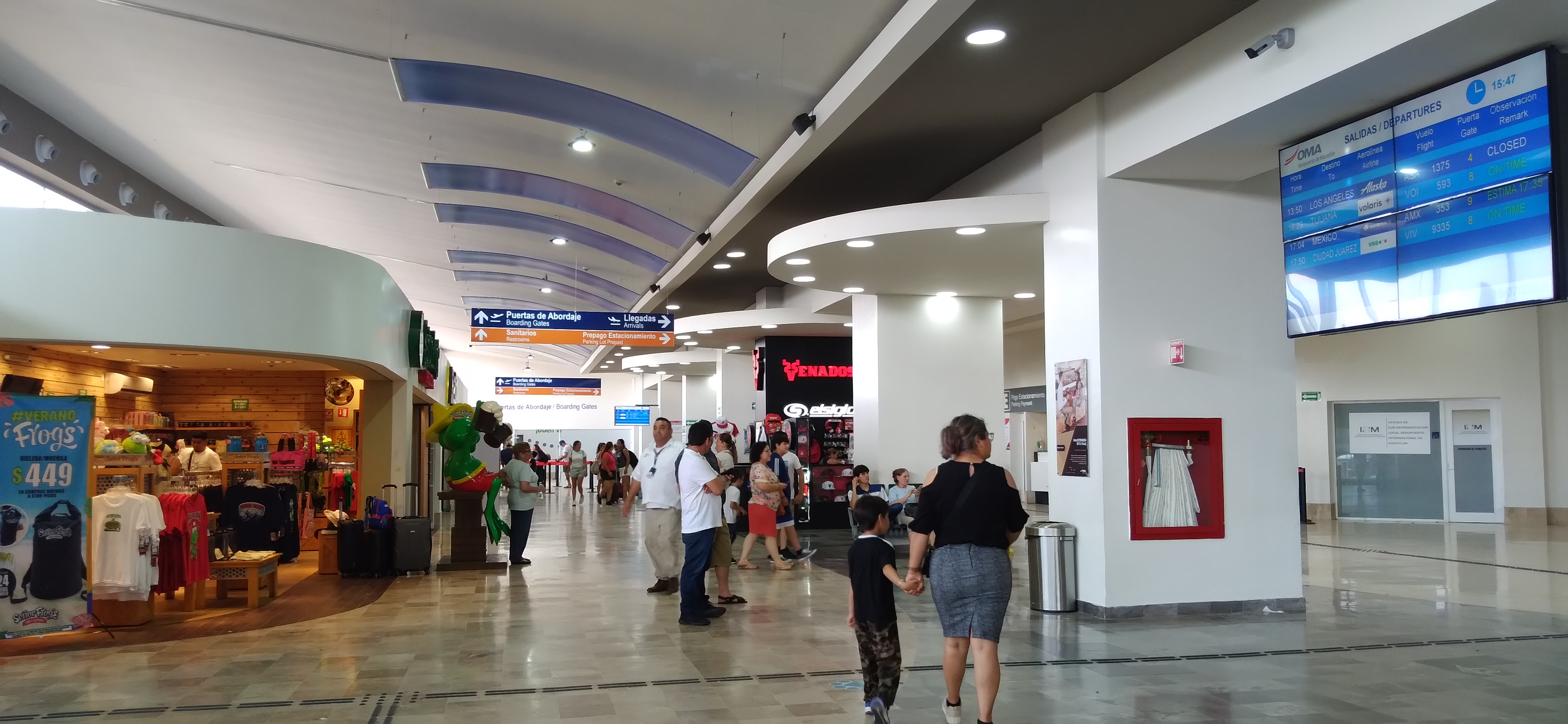
Passenger terminal

The passenger terminal accommodates both arrival and departure services for domestic and international flights within a two-story main building and two satellite terminals. The ground floor of the main building includes check-in areas and an arrivals section featuring customs and immigration facilities, a baggage claim area, and an arrivals hall. Here, passengers can access car rental services, taxi stands, snack bars, and souvenir shops. The upper floor of the main building houses the security checkpoint and a departure area equipped with a food court, duty-free shops, a VIP lounge, and a transit zone. The gates are located in two satellite buildings, designated A and B, which are connected to the main terminal via a walkway.

Satellite A serves domestic flights and features waiting areas with shops and food stands. It has four gates: gates 7 and 9 are located on the top floor and are equipped with jet bridges, while gates 6, 8, and 10 are located on the ground floor, where passengers board their aircraft directly from the apron. Airlines operating from this satellite include Aeromexico, Aeromexico Connect, Viva, Volaris, TAR, Magni, Calafia Airlines, and Aero Servicio Guerrero.

Satellite B serves international flights, primarily from U.S. American and Canadian airlines. It features sitting areas, food stands, and duty-free shops. This Satellite also features four gates (gates 1–5), with two of them equipped with jet bridges. Airlines operating from Satellite B include Alaska Airlines, American Airlines, American Eagle, Sun Country Airlines, United Express, and Westjet.

=== Other facilities ===
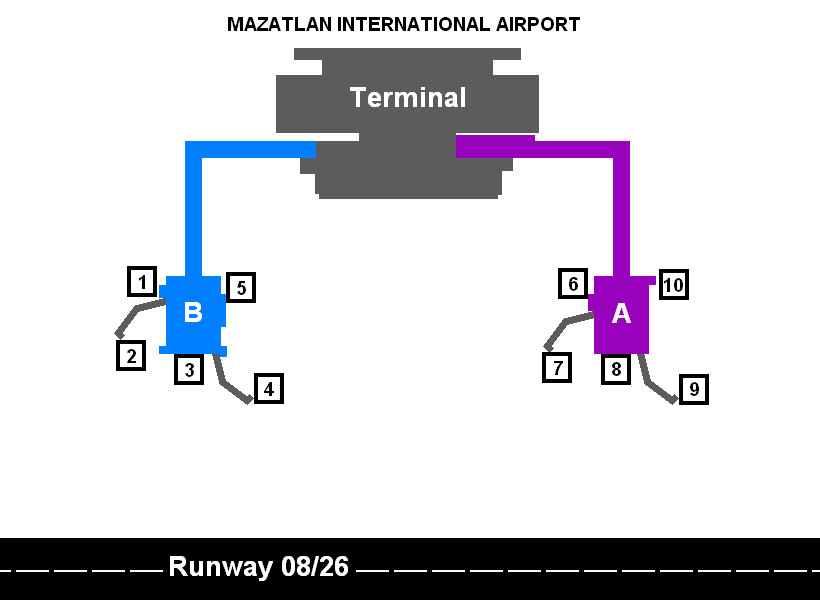
Terminal map

Adjacent to the terminal, other facilities include civil aviation hangars, cargo and logistics and courier companies, and designated spaces for general aviation. The parking facility provides both short-term and long-term parking spaces.

Mazatlán Area Control Center (ACC) is one of four Area Control Centres in Mexico, with the others being the Mexico City ACC, Monterrey ACC, and Mérida ACC. It operates under the Mexican Airspace Navigation Services, (Spanish: Servicios a la Navegación en el Espacio Aéreo Mexicano). Mazatlán ACC provides air traffic control services to aircraft within the Mazatlán Flight Data Region (FDRG). This region includes the entire Baja California Peninsula, the Gulf of California, the northern Pacific Coast of Mexico, the states of Sonora and Sinaloa, and western sections of Chihuahua, Durango, and Nayarit. It shares its boundaries with six other Area Control Centers. To the east, it is adjacent to the Monterrey ACC and Mexico ACC, while to the north, it borders the Los Angeles ARTCC and Albuquerque ARTCC. To the west, it borders the Oakland Oceanic ARTCC (KZAK) and Mazatlán Oceanic (MMFO) Flight Information Regions (FIR).

Additionally, the Mazatlan Oceanic Air Control Center (ICAO: MMFO) is located at the Mazatlán Airport. This center is responsible for providing air traffic control services within its Flight Information Region (FIR), which is one of two FIRs in Mexico, covering a significant portion of the North Pacific Ocean and spanning 2,856,498 square kilometres (1,102,900 sq mi). Its borders include the Oakland Oceanic ARTCC (KZAK) to the West, the Mexico FIR (MMFR) to the east, and the Central American FIR (MHTG) to the south.

== Airlines and destinations ==
=== Passenger ===
Airlines	Destinations
Aeroméxico	Mexico City–Benito Juárez
Air Canada Rouge	Seasonal: Vancouver (begins 15 December 2026)
Alaska Airlines	Los Angeles
American Airlines	Dallas/Fort Worth, Phoenix–Sky Harbor
Delta Air Lines	Seasonal: Minneapolis
Mexicana de Aviación	Mexico City–Felipe Ángeles
Sun Country Airlines	Seasonal: Minneapolis
TAR México	Hermosillo, La Paz, Querétaro, Torreón/Gómez Palacio
United Airlines	Houston–Intercontinental
Viva	Chihuahua, Ciudad Juárez, Mexico City–Benito Juárez, Mexico City–Felipe Ángeles, Monterrey, Tijuana
Volaris	Guadalajara, Mexico City–Benito Juárez, Querétaro, Tijuana
WestJet	Montréal–Trudeau; Seasonal: Calgary, Edmonton, Kelowna, Toronto, Vancouver, Winnipeg

=== Destinations map ===
Domestic destinations from Mazatlán International Airport
Red = Year-round destination
Blue = Future destination
Green = Seasonal destination
International destinations from Mazatlán International Airport
Red = Year-round destination
Blue = Future destination
Green = Seasonal destination

== Statistics ==
=== Annual Traffic ===
Passenger statistics at MZT
Year	Total Passengers	change %
2008	833,714	Steady
2009	743,556	▼10.82%
2010	756,122	▲1.69%
2011	722,492	▼4.45%
2012	669,407	▼7.35%
2013	731,297	▲9.25%
2014	789,234	▲7.92%
2015	853,409	▲8.13%
2016	973,440	▲14.07%
2017	994,283	▲2.14%
2018	1,038,555	▲4.45%
2019	1,161,155	▲11.81%
2020	740,306	▼36.24%
2021	1,106,071	▲49.42%
2022	1,450,944	▲31.18%
2023	1,621,740	▲11.77%
2024	1,868,817	▲15.24%
2025	1,736,208	▼7.10%

=== Busiest routes ===
Busiest domestic routes from MZT (Jan–Dec 2025)
Rank	Airport	Passengers
1	Mexico City, Mexico City	260,979
2	Tijuana, Baja California	227,289
3	Monterrey, Nuevo León	83,374
4	Mexico City-AIFA, State of Mexico	49,411
5	Ciudad Juárez, Chihuahua	30,528
6	Chihuahua, Chihuahua	16,403
7	La Paz, Baja California Sur	11,954
8	Cabo San Lucas, Baja California Sur	7,649
9	Querétaro, Querétaro	5,969
10	León/Bajío, Guanajuato	801

Busiest international routes from MZT (Jan–Dec 2025)
Rank	Airport	Passengers
1	Los Angeles, United States	35,154
2	Phoenix–Sky Harbor, United States	33,244
3	Dallas/Fort Worth, United States	21,200
4	Calgary, Canada	18,638
5	Vancouver, Canada	11,947
6	Edmonton, Canada	11,429
7	Minneapolis/St. Paul, United States	10,470
8	Toronto–Pearson, Canada	3,964
9	Winnipeg, Canada	3,081
10	Montréal–Trudeau, Canada	2,908

== See also ==
- List of the busiest airports in Mexico
- List of airports in Mexico
- List of Mexican military installations
- List of airports by ICAO code: M
- List of busiest airports in North America
- List of the busiest airports in Latin America
- Area control center
- List of area control centers
- Flight information region
- Transportation in Mexico
- Tourism in Mexico
- Grupo Aeroportuario Centro Norte
- List of beaches in Mexico
- Gulf of California
- Las Labradas
