= Calafia Airlines =

Mexican low-cost airline

IATA	ICAO	Call sign
A7	CFV	CALAFIA
- Founded: 1993; 33 years ago
- Ceased operations: 2023; 3 years ago
- Hubs: Cabo San Lucas
- Frequent-flyer program: Calafia Plus
- Fleet size: 5
- Destinations: 5
- Headquarters: Cabo San Lucas, Mexico
- Website: calafiaairlines.com

Calafia Airlines, legally Calafia Airlines S.A. de C.V. was a Mexican regional airline based in Cabo San Lucas, Baja California Sur, Mexico. It operated regular flights to the Baja California Peninsula, the Mexican Pacific coast and Northern Mexico, in addition to charter flights and tours. Its main hub was Cabo San Lucas Airport and has focus city operations in La Paz and Loreto. It operated a fleet consisting of Embraer regional jet aircraft. It was named after Calafia, the legendary warrior queen of the island of California.

== History ==
Established in 1992, Aéreo Calafia started operations in Cabo San Lucas, Baja California Sur. The company offered a variety of services, encompassing air taxi, charter flights, and short-distance tourist flights. Initially, the company owned two compact Cessna C206 aircraft and a Cessna Caravan with passenger capacities of 5 and 12, respectively.

By 1995, the company had expanded its operations and ventured into organizing tours for visitors in the Los Cabos region. Aéreo Calafia became the first regional airline to offer tours for observing grey whales, at the Sea of Cortez during the winter months. They also successfully introduced tours to destinations such as San Ignacio Lagoon, Copper Canyon, Loreto, Cabo Pulmo National Park, and La Paz. These distinctive offerings remained a hallmark of Aéreo Calafia, differentiating it from other airlines.

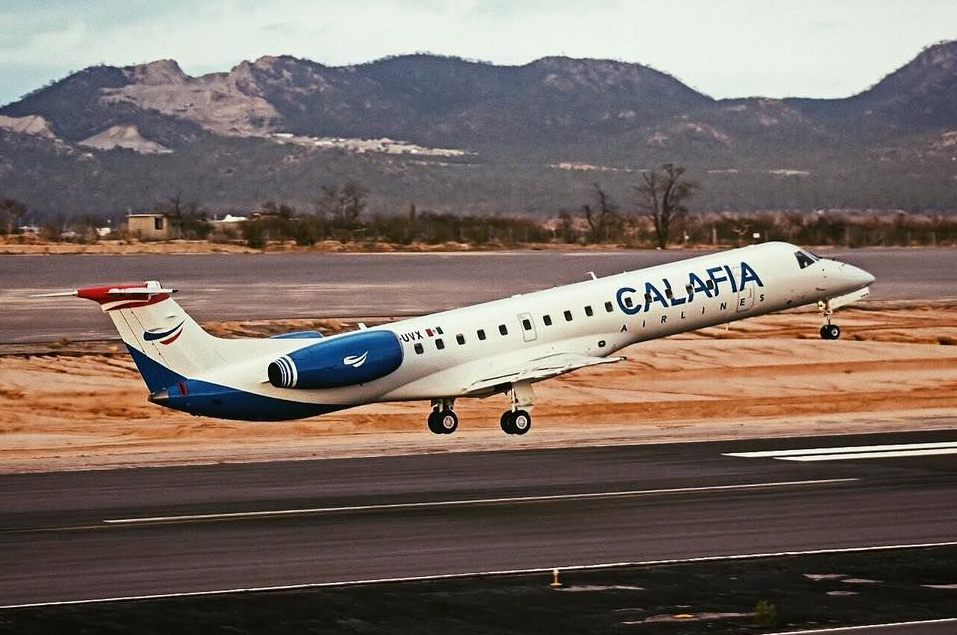
Calafia Airlines Embraer E145ER

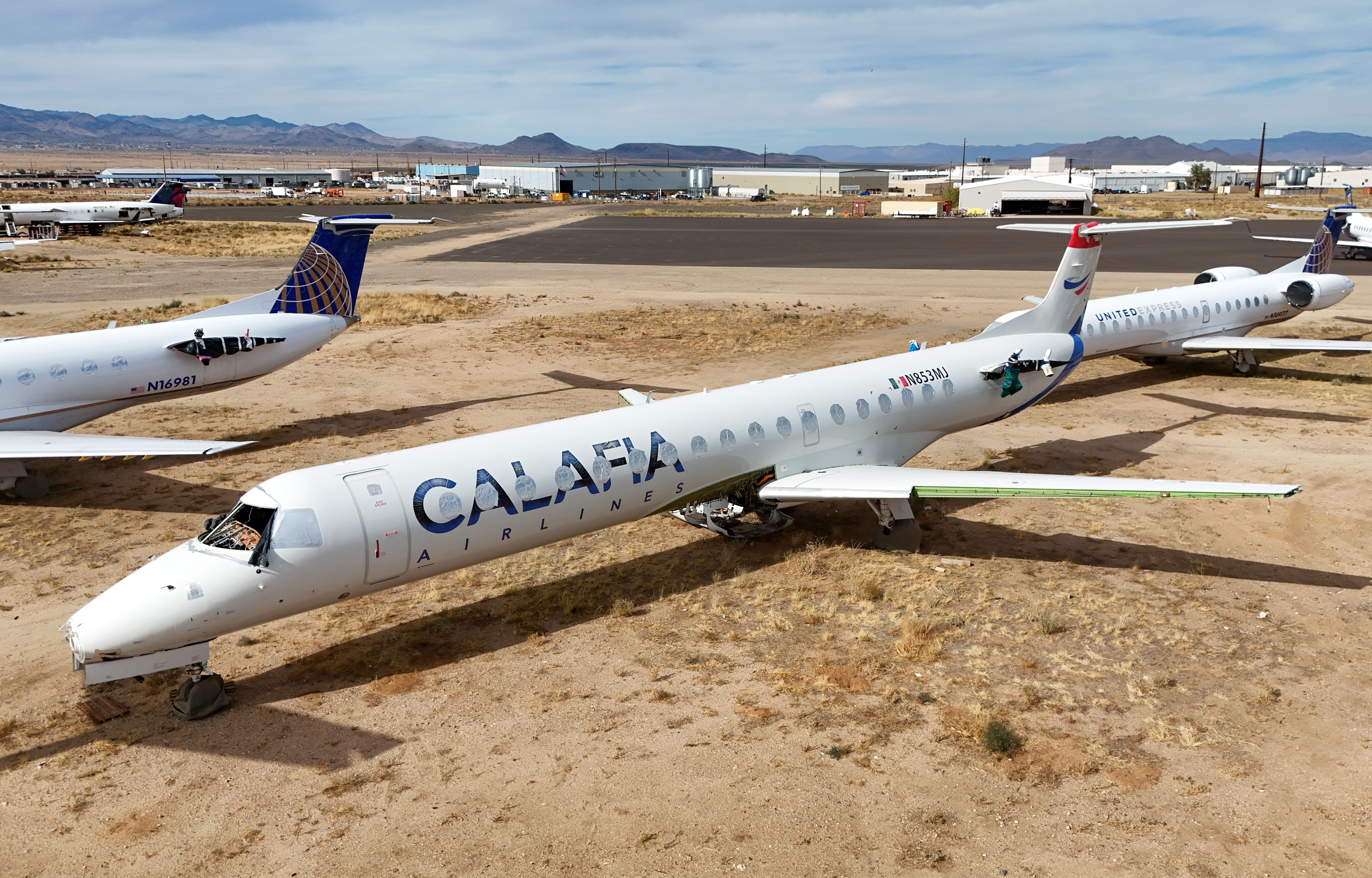
Ex-Calafia Embraer ERJ-145 parked at Kingman Airport

Over the years, the airline has transformed into a prominent regional Mexican carrier, featuring a modern fleet of Embraer EMB 120 Brasilia and Embraer ERJ 145 aircraft, with passenger seating for 36 and 50, respectively. It also added new cities to its network, including Chihuahua, Guadalajara, Tijuana, Mexicali, León, and Monterrey, connecting the Gulf of Mexico to the Pacific Ocean. This growth trajectory has been remarkable since its establishment in the 1990s as an air taxi service provider.

Calafia Airlines was named Aéreo Calafia until mid-2016 when it rebranded itself as Calafia Airlines as part of a rebranding project and commercial expansion announcing plans for new routes within Mexico and international destinations.

In 2017, it unveiled routes connecting the Pacific to the Gulf and initiated the Guadalajara-Puebla-Tuxtla-Palenque-Cancún route; as of 2023, such routes, in addition to Mexicali, Leon and Monterrey are no longer served. In August 2023, Calafia Airlines suspended operations temporarily due to pending procedures with the Mexican Civil Aviation Federal Agency, leaving passengers stranded. Calafia Airlines had faced a complex recovery from the COVID-19 pandemic. The company carried 49,698 passengers between January and June 2023, a 34.5% recovery versus the same period in 2019. According to data from the Mexican government, Calafia Airlines only had one aircraft in its fleet at the end of 2023’s second quarter. This aircraft is an Embraer E145ER.

== Destinations ==
Calafia Airlines had the following destinations:

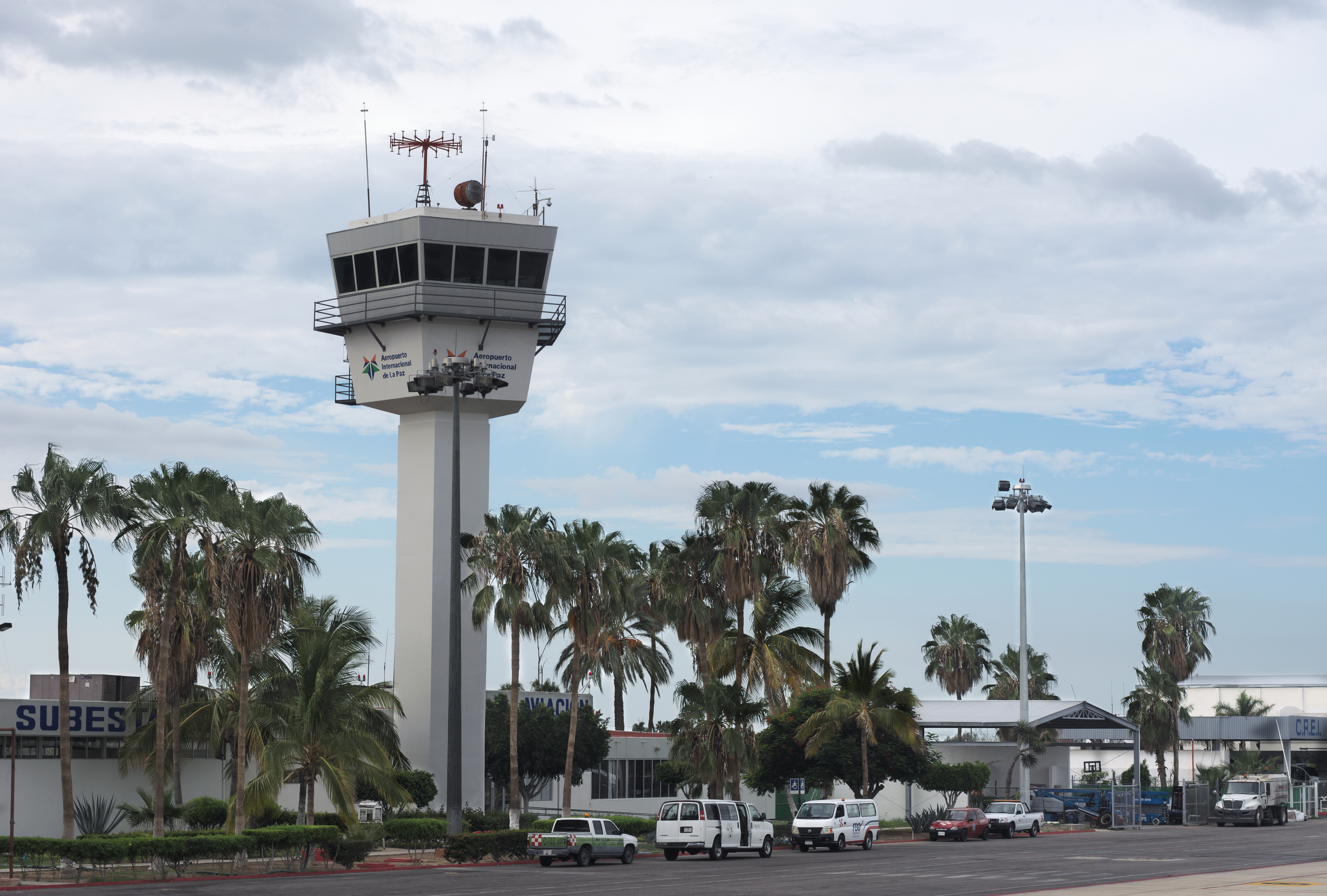
International Airport, La Paz, Baja California Sur, México

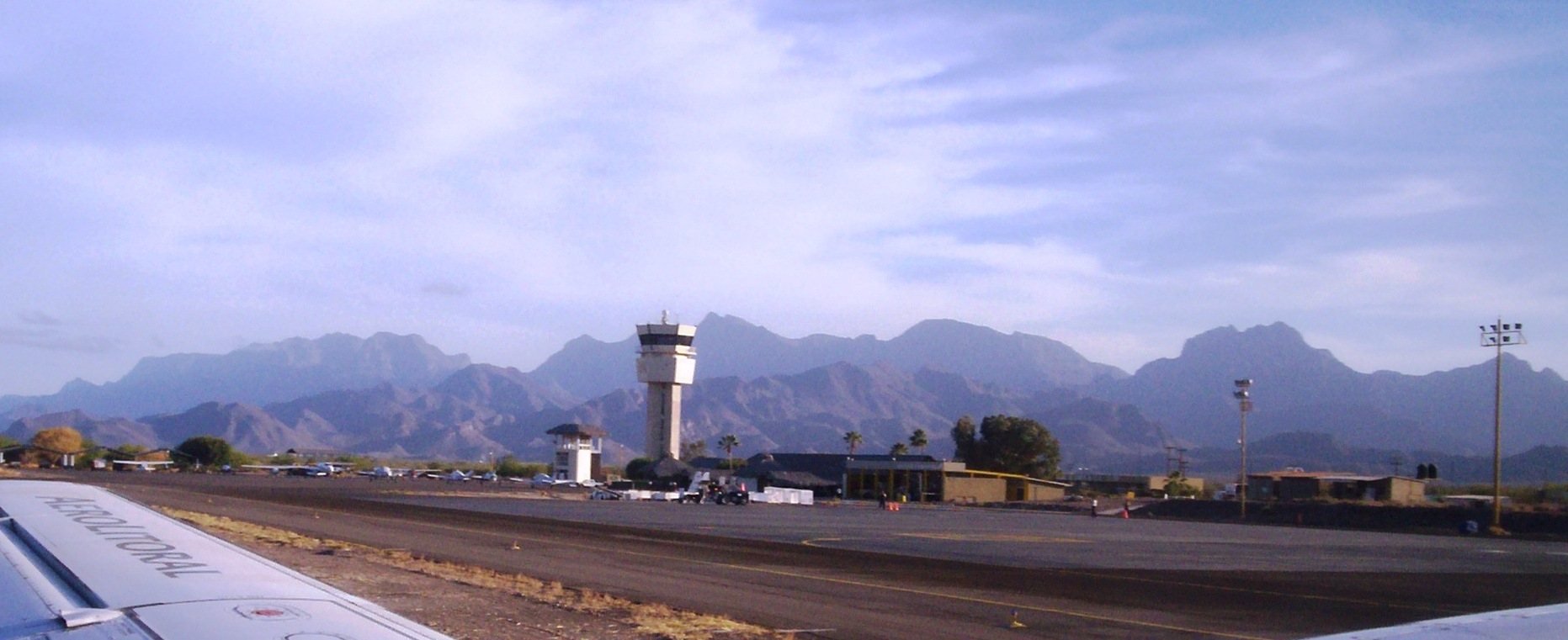
Loreto International Airport — Loreto, Baja California Sur.

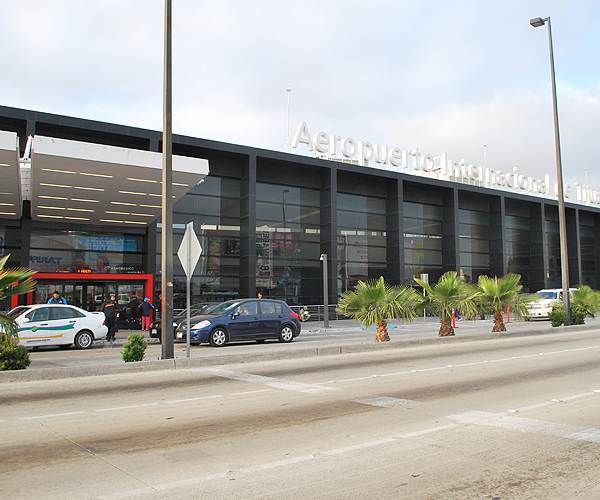
Tijuana International Airport

=== Baja California Sur ===
- Cabo San Lucas (Cabo San Lucas International Airport) Hub

=== Sinaloa ===
- Culiacán (Culiacán International Airport)
- Guasave (Campo Cuatro Milpas Airport)
- Mazatlán (Mazatlán International Airport)

=== Sonora ===
- Ciudad Obregón (Ciudad Obregón International Airport)

=== Former destinations ===
==== Baja California ====
- Tijuana (Tijuana International Airport)
- Mexicali (Mexicali International Airport)

==== Baja California Sur ====
- Ciudad Constitución (Ciudad Constitución Airport)
- La Paz (La Paz International Airport)
- Loreto (Loreto International Airport)
- San José del Cabo (Los Cabos International Airport)

==== Chihuahua ====
- Chihuahua (Chihuahua International Airport)
- Ciudad Juárez International Airport

==== Jalisco ====
- Guadalajara (Guadalajara International Airport)
- Puerto Vallarta (Licenciado Gustavo Díaz Ordaz International Airport)

==== Nuevo León ====
- Monterrey (Monterrey International Airport)

==== Sinaloa ====
- Los Mochis (Los Mochis International Airport)

==== Sonora ====
- Hermosillo (Hermosillo International Airport)
- Puerto Peñasco (Mar de Cortés International Airport)

== Fleet ==
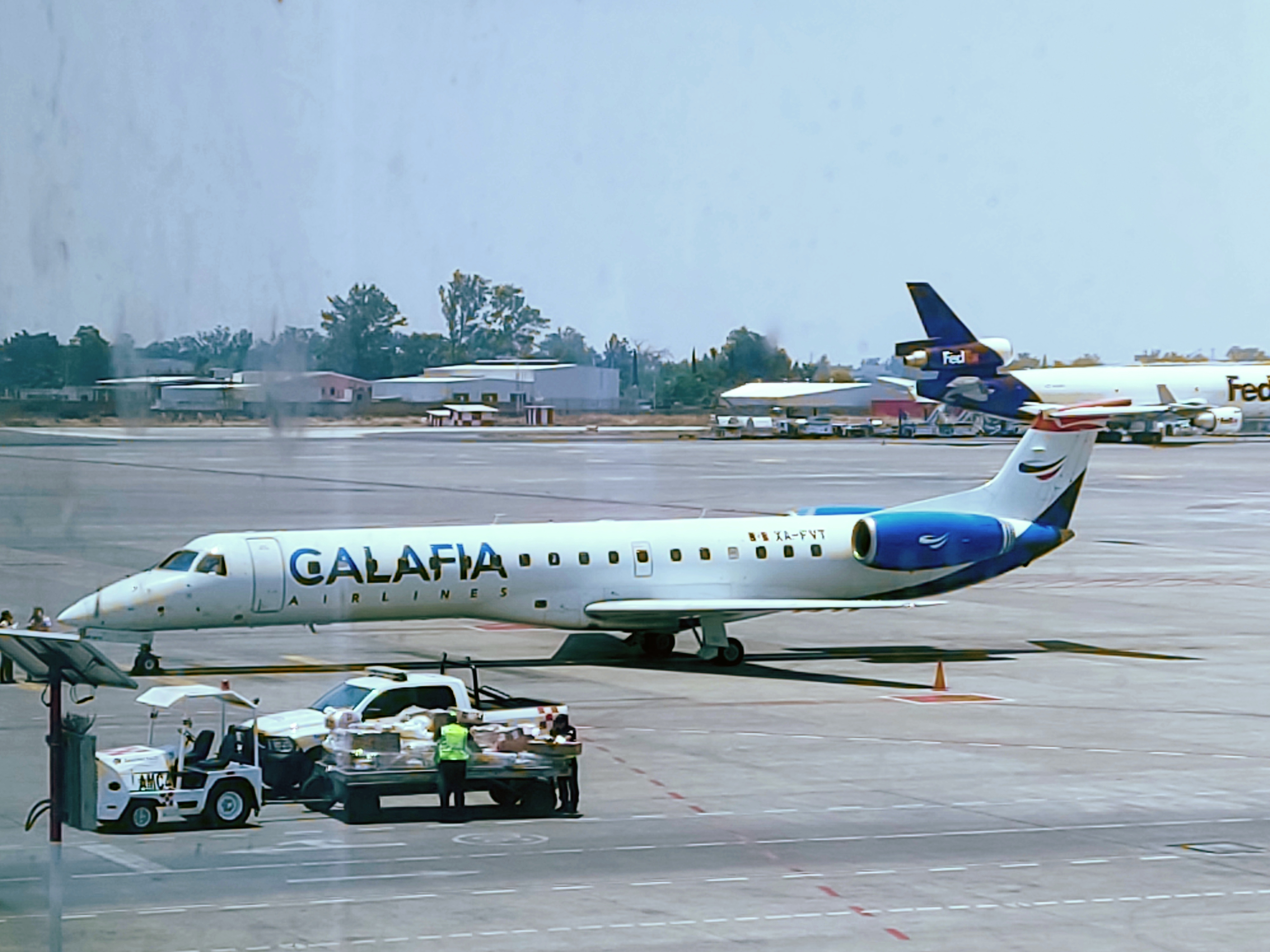
A Calafia Airlines Embraer ERJ 145ER at Guadalajara Airport.

=== Current fleet ===
As of August 2025, Calafia Airlines operates the following aircraft:

Aircraft	In service	Orders	Passengers	Notes
Embraer EMB 120ER	2	—		
Embraer ERJ 145EP	1	—		
Embraer ERJ 145ER	1	—		
Embraer ERJ 145LR	1	—		
Total	5	—		

=== Historic fleet ===
Calafia Airlines also previously operated the following aircraft types:

- Cessna 208 Caravan
- Cessna 210 Centurion
- Cessna 182 Skylane
- Embraer EMB 120ER Brasilia
- Piper PA-31 Navajo

== Incidents and accidents ==
Flight	Date	Aircraft	Location	Passengers	Description
126	5 Nov 2007	Cessna 208B Grand Caravan	Culiacán, Sinaloa.	13	Just departing from CUL to CSL, the airplane lost altitude and crash-landed in a field near the airport. No casualties.
