= Aero California =

Airline of Mexico

IATA	ICAO	Call sign
JR	SER	AEROCALIFORNIA
- Founded: 1960; 66 years ago
- Ceased operations: July 23, 2008; 17 years ago
- Hubs: Mexico City International Airport
- Focus cities: Guadalajara; Tijuana
- Headquarters: La Paz, Mexico
- Website: www.aerocalifornia.com.mx

Aero California (at times shortened as AeroCal) was a low-cost airline with its headquarters in La Paz, Baja California Sur, Mexico, operating a network of domestic passenger flights with its hub at the city's Manuel Márquez de León International Airport.

== History ==
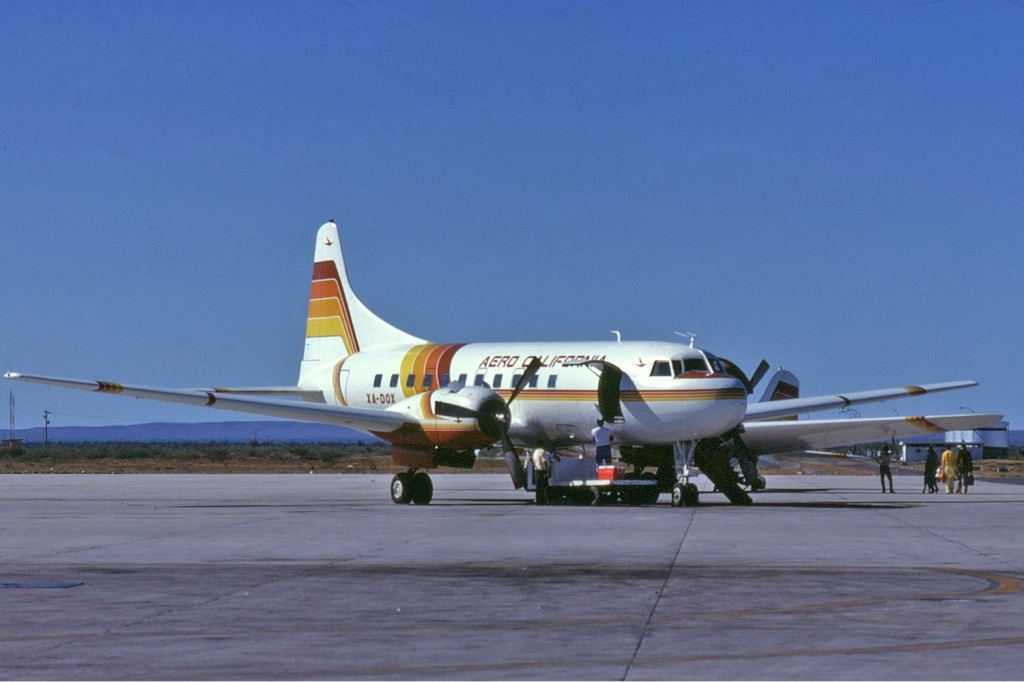
An Aero California Convair CV-340 at Manuel Márquez de León International Airport in 1981

The airline was founded in La Paz, Mexico in 1960 as an air taxi operator using a fleet of Cessna and Beechcraft airplanes, initially known as Servicios Aéreos. By the early 1980s the demand for domestic charter flights had grown enough that the larger Douglas DC-3 was added to the fleet. Scheduled services were launched in June 1982, initially interlinking La Paz, Tijuana and Hermosillo using one Convair 340. In 1989, international scheduled jet flights commenced, with Los Angeles being the first destination. By late 1989, the airline was also serving Phoenix and Tucson besides Los Angeles in the U.S. In 1992, San Diego had been added to the list of cities served by Aero California in the U.S. By 1995, the fleet had been upgraded to only include jet aircraft of various McDonnell Douglas DC-9 subtypes.

On April 3, 2006 all operations of Aero California were suspended by the Mexican Secretariat of Communications and Transport, for alleged deficiencies of administrative and operative nature. It was given 90 days to correct the problems and was able to resume services on August 11, 2006. On July 23, 2008 (at a time when the route network consisted of 17 domestic destinations), the airline was again suspended, this time due to an alleged debt with the Mexican Air Traffic Control (SENEAM). This prompted a labor strike of the employees on August 5, which technically continues to the present day. Aero California's license still remains valid to this day.

== Fleet ==
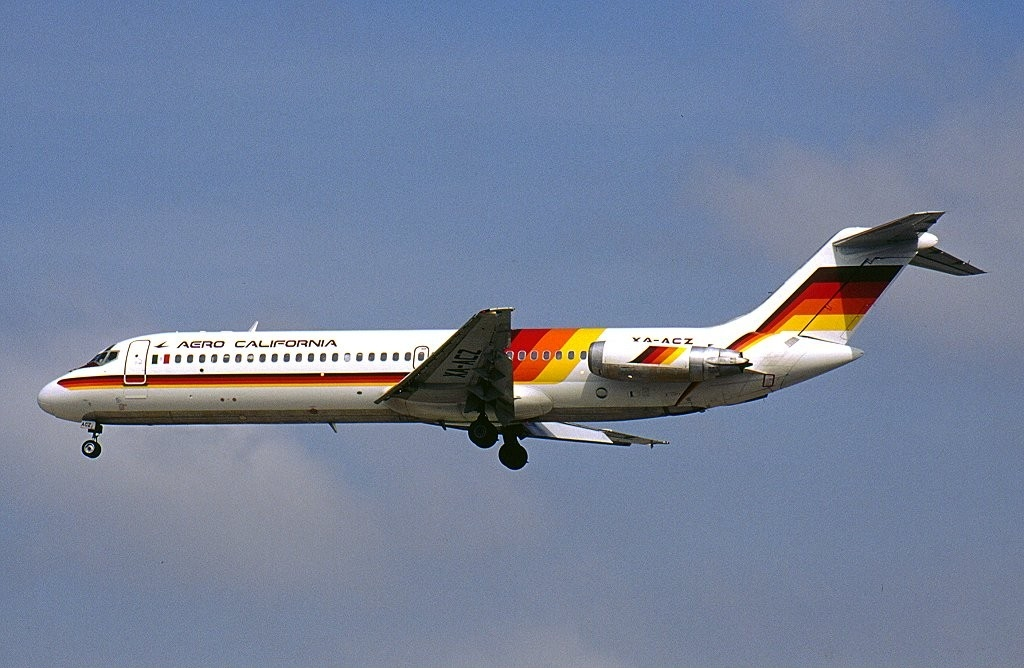
An Aero California McDonnell Douglas DC-9-32 approaching Los Angeles International Airport in 2001

Aero California operated the following aircraft during its existence:

- 1 Beechcraft 18
- 2 Cessna 185 Skywagon
- 2 Cessna 206 Stationair
- 1 Convair 340
- 2 Douglas C-47 Skytrain
- 2 Douglas DC-3
- 5 McDonnell Douglas DC-9-14
- 7 McDonnell Douglas DC-9-15
- 23 McDonnell Douglas DC-9-32

The airline was operating an all-jet fleet with DC-9 aircraft when it ceased operations.

== Accidents and incidents ==
- Aero California suffered one fatal accident, which occurred on January 29, 1986. A Douglas DC-3 (registered XA-IOR) crashed into a range of hills near Las Lomitas during bad weather and visibility conditions, killing all 18 passengers and 3 crew. The aircraft had been on a scheduled passenger flight from Villa Constitución Airport to Los Mochis Airport.
- On July 21, 2004 at 19:33 local time, a Douglas DC-9 (registered XA-BCS) encountered a wind shear upon take-off at Mexico City International Airport to Durango. All 52 passengers and the four crew members survived the accident, but the airframe was damaged beyond repair and written off.
