= MMLP =

MMLP can refer to any of the following:

- The Marshall Mathers LP, rapper Eminem's third studio album.
  - The Marshall Mathers LP 2, a continuation of the above work and Eminem's eighth album.
- The ICAO airport code for Manuel Márquez de León International Airport in La Paz, Baja California Sur.
- Martin Midstream Partners L.P. a publicly traded master limited partnership. MMLP trades on the NASDAQ exchange.
- Marion Maréchal-Le Pen
