= Hermosillo International Airport =

International airport in Sonora, Mexico

Hermosillo International Airport Aeropuerto Internacional de Hermosillo
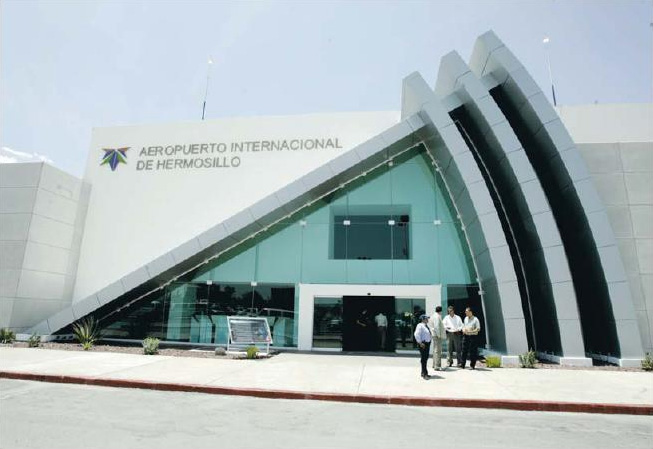
- IATA: HMO; ICAO: MMHO

Summary
- Airport type: Military; public
- Owner/Operator: Grupo Aeroportuario del Pacífico
- Serves: Hermosillo, Sonora, Mexico
- Hub for: Aéreo Servicio Guerrero
- Focus city for: TAR
- Time zone: MST (UTC-07:00)
- Elevation AMSL: 191 m (627 ft)
- Coordinates: 29°05′45″N 111°02′52″W
- Website: www.aeropuertosgap.com.mx/en/hermosillo-3.html

Map
- Location of the airport in Sonora HMO (Mexico)

Runways
Direction	Length		Surface
Direction	m	ft	Surface
05/23	2,300	7,546	Asphalt
~~11/29~~ (Closed)	~~1,100~~	~~3,609~~	~~Asphalt~~

Statistics (2025)
- Total passengers: 2,203,100
- Ranking in Mexico: 13th ▼1
- Source: Grupo Aeroportuario del Pacífico

Hermosillo International Airport (Spanish: Aeropuerto Internacional de Hermosillo); officially Aeropuerto Internacional General Ignacio L. Pesqueira (General Ignacio L. Pesqueira International Airport) (IATA: HMO, ICAO: MMHO), is an international airport situated in Hermosillo, Sonora, Mexico. It handles both national and international air traffic for the Hermosillo metropolitan area. It also houses military facilities for the Mexican Army and supports logistics and cargo airlines. Additionally, it facilitates various activities related to tourism, flight training, and general aviation. It functions as a focus city for the regional airline TAR Aerolíneas.

The airport's operations are managed by Grupo Aeroportuario del Pacífico, and it is named after Ignacio Pesqueira, a former Governor of Sonora. It ranked as the busiest airport in Sonora and the twelfth-largest in Mexico, serving 2,156,900 passengers in 2024 and 2,203,100 in 2025. Traffic surpassed the 2-million threshold for the first time in 2023.

== History ==
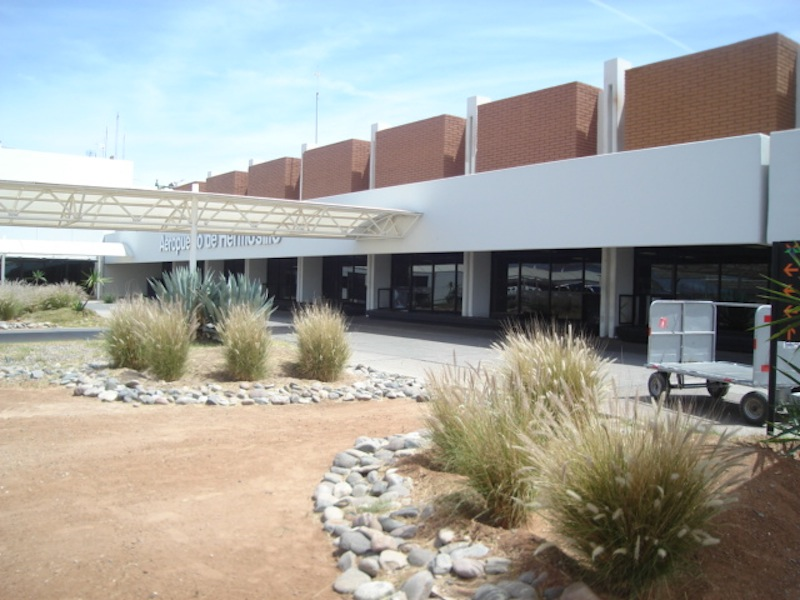
Passenger terminal airside

The current airport was inaugurated in 1982 to replace the former airfield previously located in an area known as La Manga. Hermosillo has a historical significance as a commercial aviation hub, particularly for Aeromexico. Starting in the 1940s, it served as a connecting point for cities in northwestern Mexico and Arizona, including Tijuana, La Paz, Chihuahua, Torreón, Nogales, Ciudad Obregón, Guaymas, Cananea, Tucson, and Phoenix.

During the 1990s and 2000s, Aerolitoral, now known as Aeroméxico Connect, operated a hub out of Hermosillo for many years. This hub connected cities across Mexico and also offered flights to U.S. cities such as Los Angeles and Phoenix. However, it was eventually downsized to a focus city and ultimately closed in 2017.

From 1988 to 1999, the airport served as the headquarters and hub for the regional airline Aviación del Noroeste. In the early 2000s, the airport's runway and taxiways were widened to accommodate wide-body aircraft that might need to divert, such as Aeromexico's Boeing 787 on several occasions.

== Facilities ==
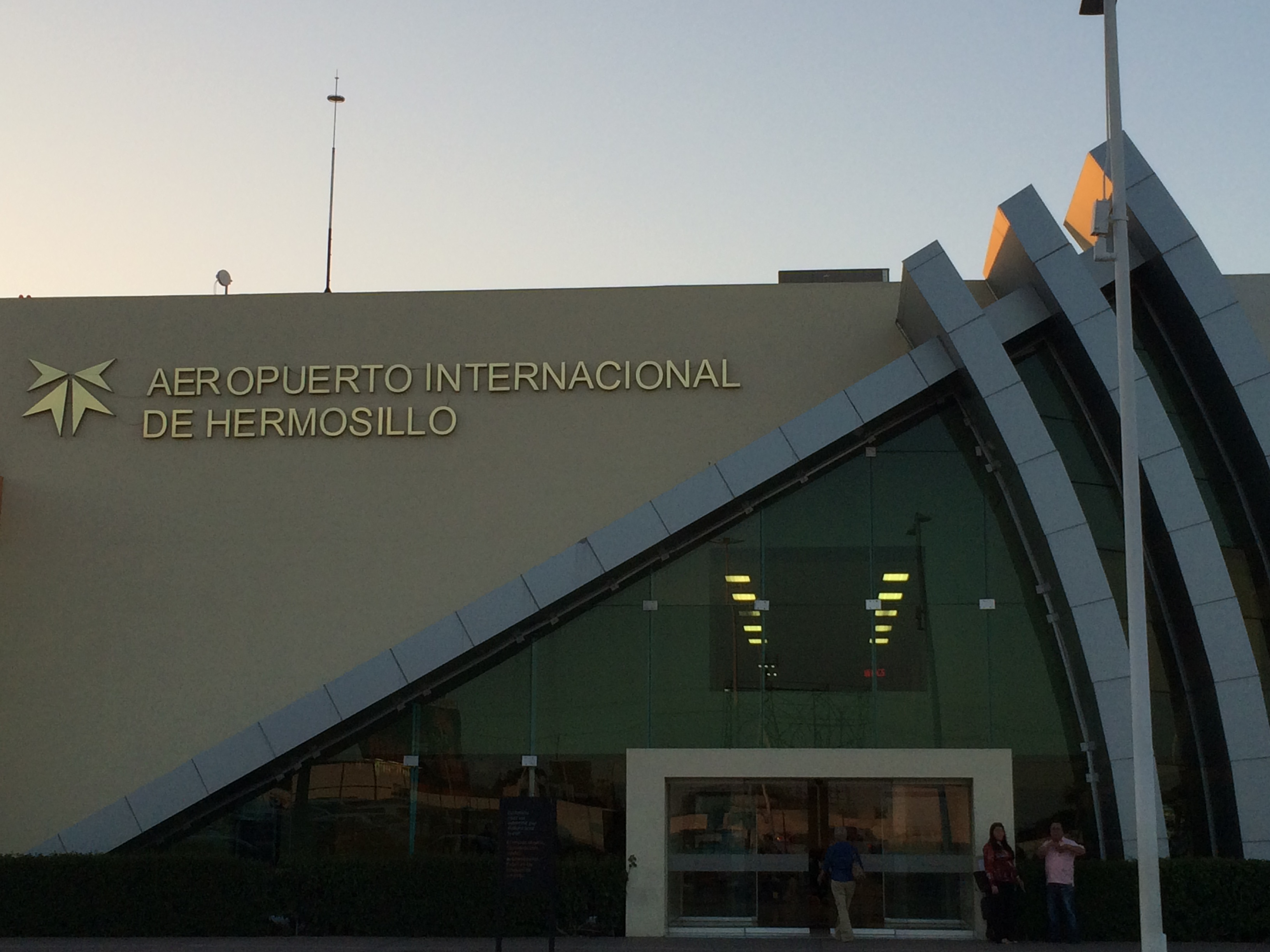
Passenger terminal entrance

The airport is situated at an elevation of 191 metres (627 ft) above mean sea level. It features a single runway, designated as 05/23, measuring 2,300 metres (7,500 ft) in length and surfaced with asphalt. The commercial apron can accommodate 12 narrow-body aircraft, and there is a general aviation apron for fixed-wing aircraft as well as two heliports for private and occasional third-level commercial aviation use. The airport frequently serves as the primary alternate airport for flights going to Tijuana International Airport in cases of unfavorable weather or technical issues.

The passenger terminal accommodates both arrivals and departures for domestic and international flights. The ground floor houses the arrivals area with customs and immigration facilities, the baggage claim area, and the departures section that includes a check-in area, a security checkpoint, and a departures concourse with gates 1-6 that provide direct access to the apron, enabling passengers to walk to their aircraft. From this departure concourse, access to the upper floor is available, which houses snack bars, souvenir shops, and gates 7 and 8 equipped with jet bridges for boarding. The airport provides taxi services, and ground transportation is offered by four companies with a fleet of 120 vehicles, including cars and Eurovan-type vans.

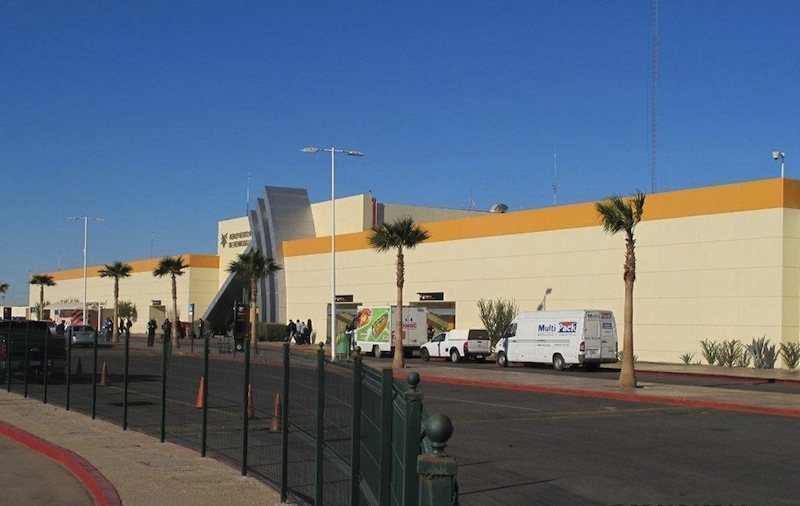
Passenger terminal entrance

Hermosillo Airport also hosts cargo facilities and includes a dedicated general aviation terminal situated to the north of the passenger terminal. It supports various activities, such as tourism, flight training, executive aviation, and general aviation. The airport has obtained several certifications, including the Clean Industry certification from PROFEP, ISO-9000, and accessibility for users with special needs. Within its facilities, there is a water treatment plant that processes sewage water for reuse in garden irrigation and various construction processes, including dust control and earthwork.

Air Force Base No. 18 (Spanish: Base Aérea Militar No. 18 Hermosillo, Sonora) (BAM-18) is a facility of the Mexican Air Force located at the Hermosillo Airport. It is the operational base for the 107th Air Squadron, which operates Cessna 182 and Pilatus PC-6 aircraft. Additionally, the 3rd Air Surveillance Squadron operates C-26 Metroliner and Embraer 145 AEW&C aircraft at these facilities, and the 204th Air Squadron operates Beechcraft T-6 Texan II aircraft. The base encompasses a 17,500-square-metre (188,000 sq ft) aviation platform, three hangars, and various accommodations for Air Force personnel.

== Airlines and destinations ==
=== Passenger ===
Airlines	Destinations
Aeroméxico	Mexico City–Benito Juárez
Aeroméxico Connect	Mexico City–Benito Juárez
Aéreo Servicio Guerrero	Guerrero Negro
American Eagle	Phoenix–Sky Harbor
Cabo Flight Center	Cabo San Lucas
Mexicana de Aviación	Mexico City–Felipe Ángeles
TAR México	Chihuahua, Ciudad Juárez, Culiacán, La Paz, Torreón/Gómez Palacio
Viva	Cancún, Guadalajara, Mexico City–Benito Juárez, Monterrey, San José del Cabo
Volaris	Guadalajara, Mexicali, Mexico City–Benito Juárez, Tijuana

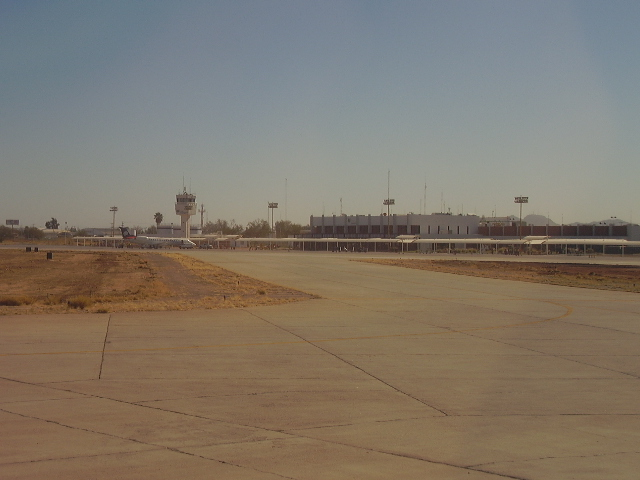
Airport apron at HMO

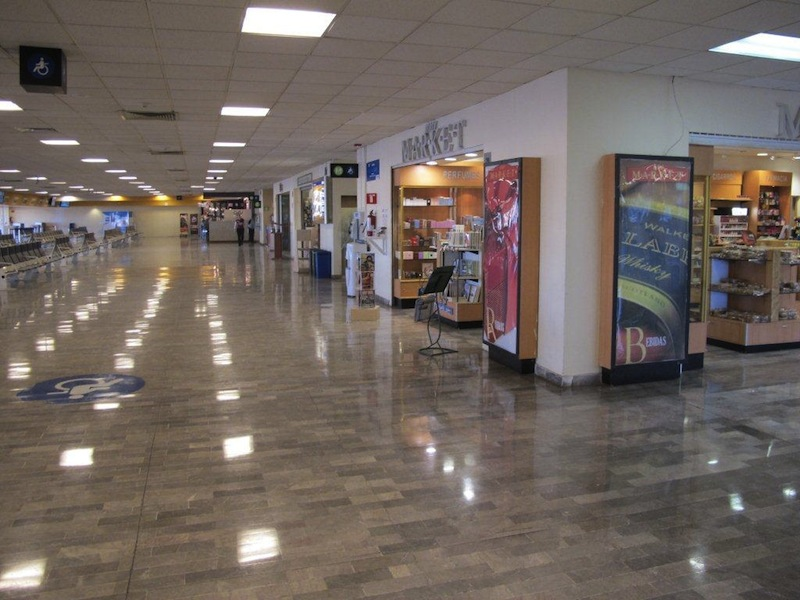
Departures concourse

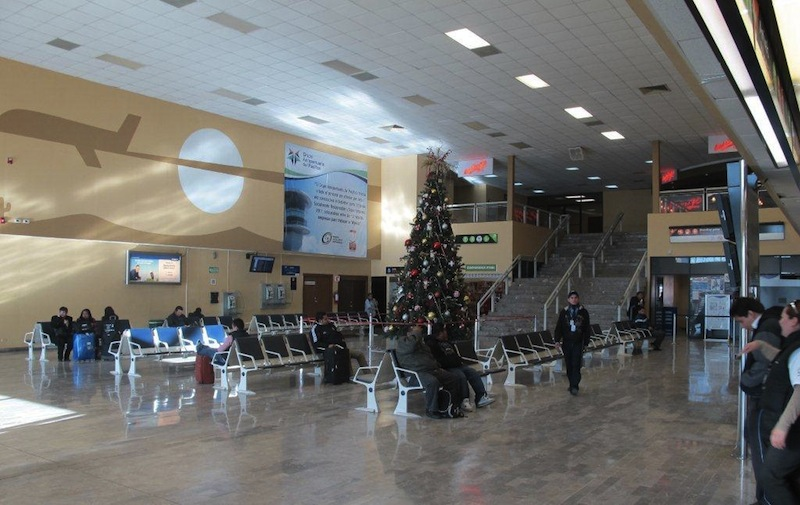
Passenger terminal entrance hall

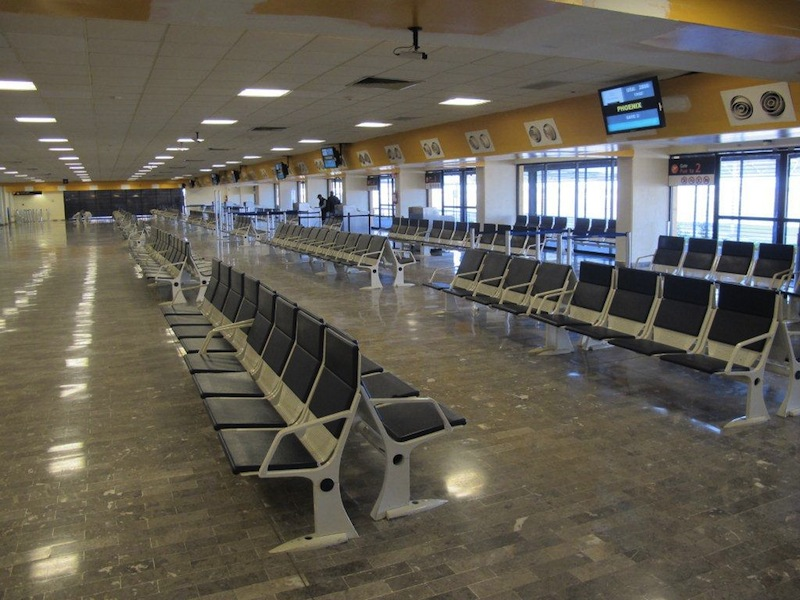
Departures concourse

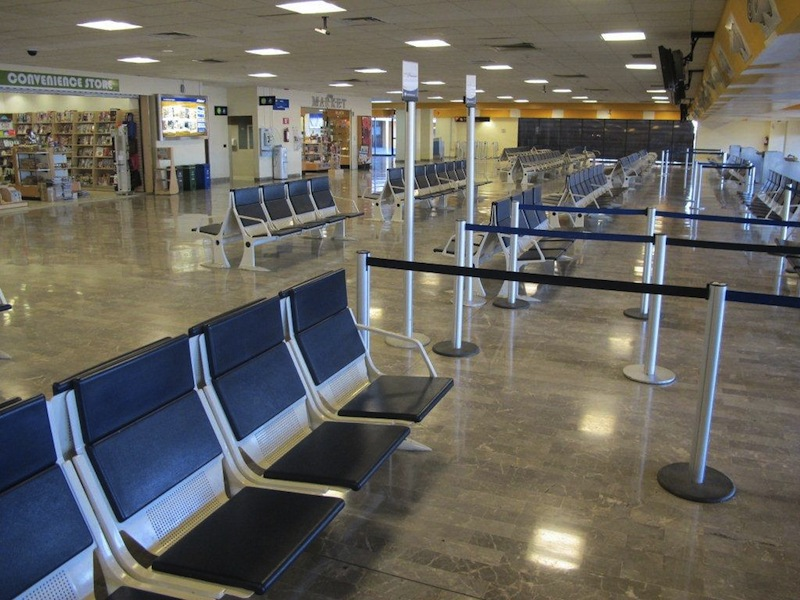
Departures concourse

=== Destinations map ===
Domestic destinations from Hermosillo International Airport
Red = Year-round destination
Blue = Future destination
Green = Seasonal destination
International destinations from Hermosillo International Airport
Red = Year-round destination
Blue = Future destination
Green = Seasonal destination

== Statistics ==
=== Annual Traffic ===
Passenger statistics at HMO
Year	Total Passengers	change %
2008	1,284,800	Steady
2009	1,174,400	▼8.6%
2010	1,138,300	▼3.1%
2011	1,200,900	▲5.5%
2012	1,288,700	▲7.3%
2013	1,329,900	▲3.2%
2014	1,326,200	▼0.3%
2015	1,349,300	▲1.7%
2016	1,561,500	▲15.7%
2017	1,627,800	▲4.2%
2018	1,743,800	▲7.1%
2019	1,874,100	▲7.5%
2020	984,200	▼47.7%
2021	1,559,900	▲58.5%
2022	1,945,400	▲24.7%
2023	2,189,900	▲12.5%
2024	2,156,700	▼1.5%
2025	2,203,100	▲2.2%

=== Busiest routes ===
Busiest routes at HMO (Jan–Dec 2025)
Rank	Airport	Passengers
1	Mexico City, Mexico City	393,943
2	Guadalajara, Jalisco	184,043
3	Monterrey, Nuevo León	167,012
4	Tijuana, Baja California	166,876
5	Mexico City-AIFA, State of Mexico	56,742
6	Phoenix–Sky Harbor, United States	25,479
7	Mexicali, Baja California	20,924
8	San José del Cabo, Baja California Sur	17,134
9	La Paz, Baja California Sur	10,518
10	Chihuahua, Chihuahua	9,313

== See also ==
- List of the busiest airports in Mexico
- List of airports in Mexico
- List of airports by ICAO code: M
- List of busiest airports in North America
- List of the busiest airports in Latin America
- Transportation in Mexico
- Tourism in Mexico
- Grupo Aeroportuario del Pacífico
- List of beaches in Mexico
- List of Mexican military installations
- Mexican Air Force
