= Cabo San Lucas International Airport =

International airport in Baja California Sur, Mexico

Cabo San Lucas International Airport Aeropuerto Internacional de Cabo San Lucas
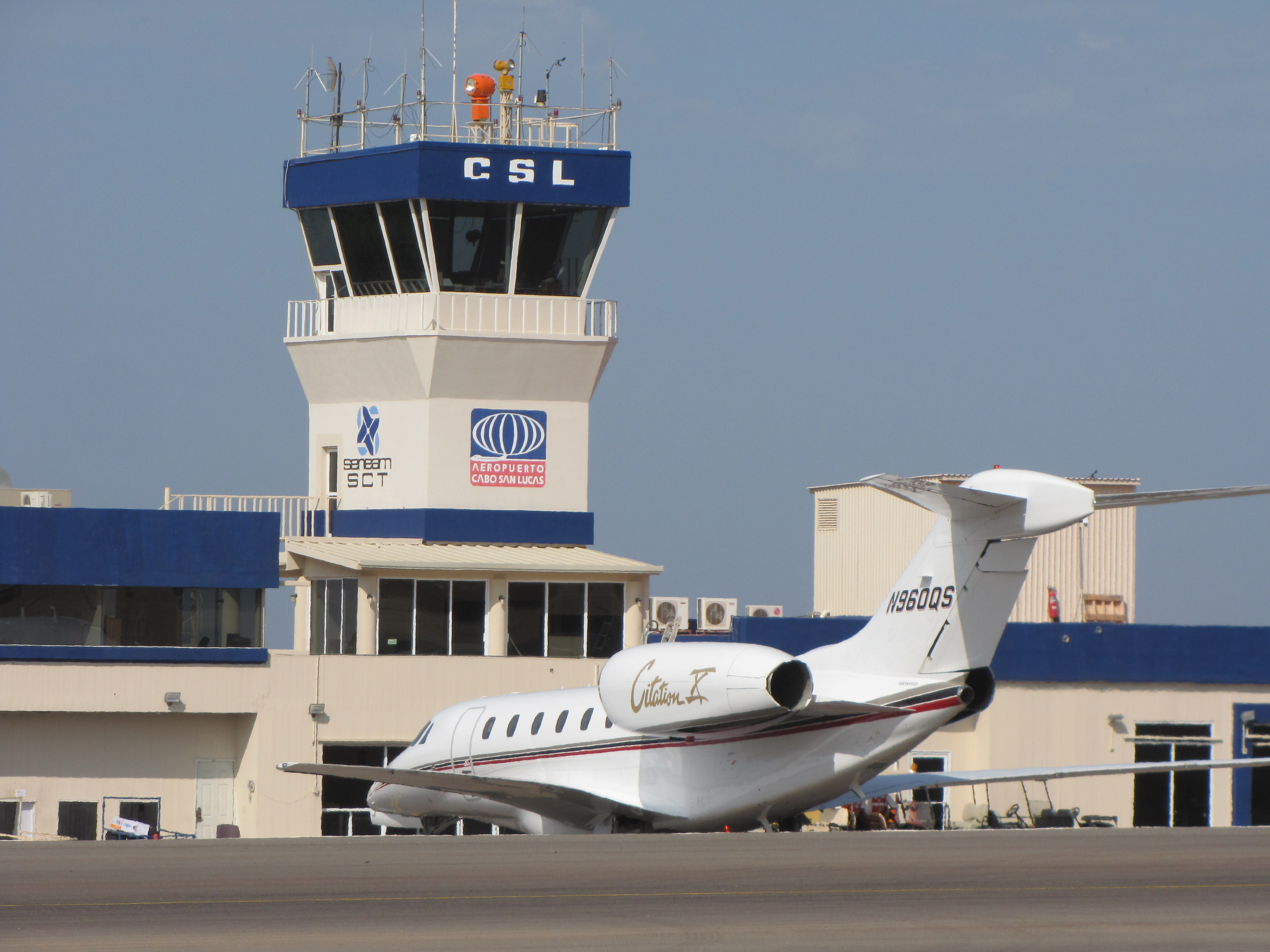
- IATA: CSW; ICAO: MMSL; LID: CSL

Summary
- Airport type: Public
- Owner/Operator: Aeropuerto Cabo San Lucas Internacional SA de CV
- Serves: Los Cabos, Baja California Sur, Mexico
- Location: Cabo San Lucas, Baja California Sur, Mexico
- Hub for: Cabo Flight Center
- Time zone: MST (UTC-07:00)
- Elevation AMSL: 211 m (692 ft)
- Coordinates: 22°56′51″N 109°56′13″W
- Website: www.acsl.com.mx/en/

Maps
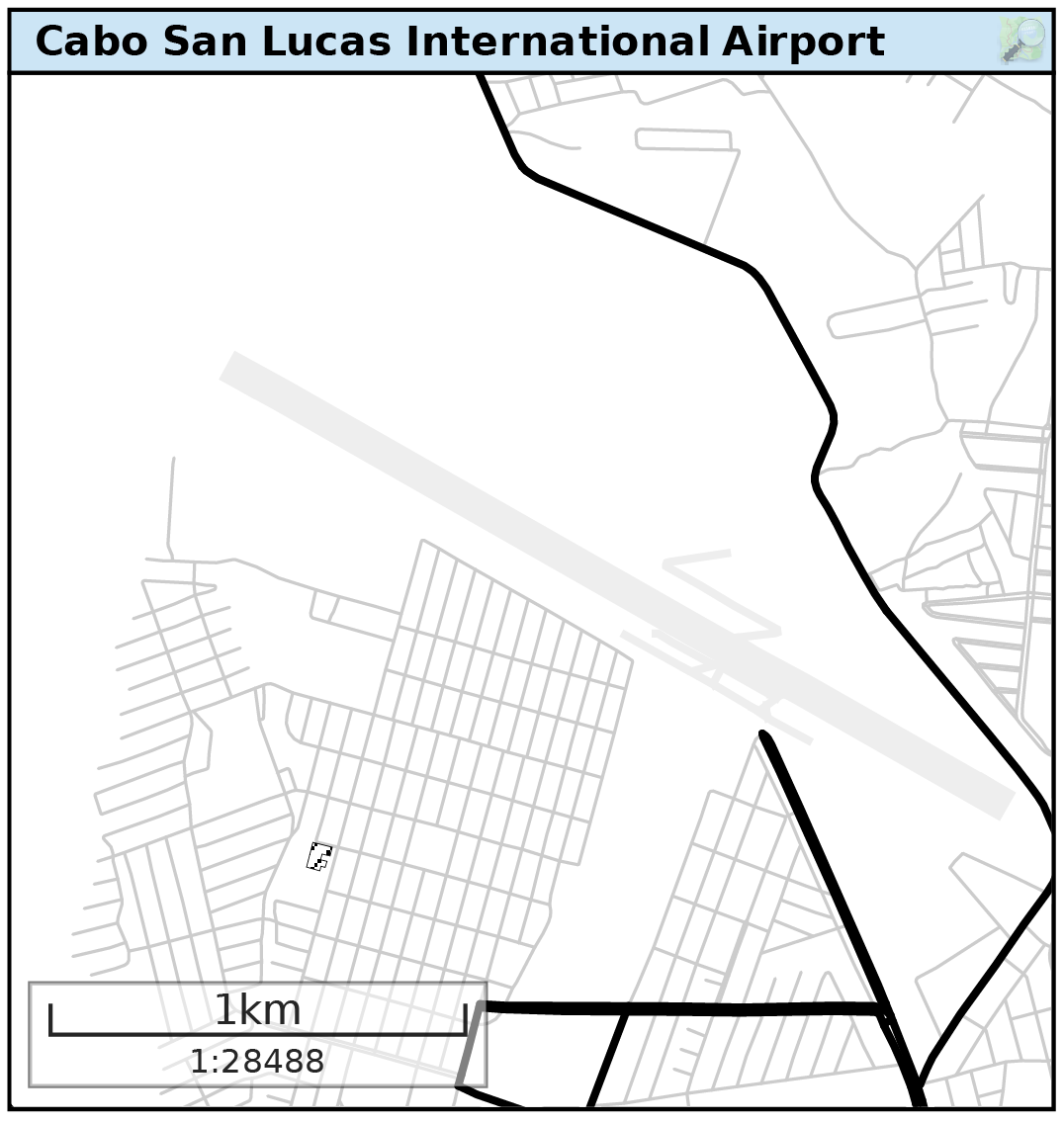

- Location of the airport in Baja California Sur MMSL (Mexico)

Runways
| Direction | Length | | Surface |
| Direction | m | ft | Surface |
|---|---|---|---|
| 11/29 | 2,400 | 7,874 | Asphalt |

Statistics (2025)
- Total passengers: 51,201
- Ranking in Mexico: 53rd
- Source: Agencia Federal de Aviación Civil

Cabo San Lucas International Airport (Spanish: Aeropuerto Internacional de Cabo San Lucas) (IATA: CSW, ICAO: MMSL) is an international airport located in Cabo San Lucas, Baja California Sur, Mexico. It serves as a secondary airport to the popular tourist destination of the Los Cabos region on the Baja California peninsula. In contrast to the larger Los Cabos International Airport situated approximately 32 kilometres (20 mi) to the north, Cabo San Lucas Airport primarily focuses on regional flights within western Mexico, as well as charter and commercial flights to the United States. It used to operate as the main hub for the defunct regional airline Calafia Airlines. The airport also supports various activities in general and executive aviation, air taxi services, and flight training. It is the only privately owned international airport in the country. The airport handled 51,201 passengers in 2025.

== Facilities ==
The airport features a runway measuring 2,400 metres (7,900 ft). South of the runway, there is a small apron and a series of hangars designed for general aviation purposes. North of the runway, an apron with four plane stands caters to narrow-body aircraft and executive aviation, along with the primary Passenger Terminal.

The passenger terminal, a single-story structure, serves both arrivals and departures for domestic and international flights. The departures area comprises a check-in section, a security checkpoint, and a departure concourse featuring a VIP lounge, snack bars, souvenir shops, and four gates that provide direct access to the apron, allowing passengers to board their planes by walking to the aircraft through a series of ramps and walkways. The arrivals section includes customs and immigration facilities, a baggage claim area, and an arrivals hall equipped with car rental services, taxi stands, snack bars, and souvenir shops.

Recent enhancements at the airport include the installation of new navigation aids, updated air traffic control equipment, the addition of a control tower, improved lighting, PAPI visual aids, and a new Fixed-Base Operator (FBO) equipped with all necessary ground support equipment. The airport operates from 6:00 AM to 8:00 PM local time.

== Airlines and destinations ==
=== Passenger ===
| Airlines | Destinations |
|---|---|
| Cabo Flight Center | Chihuahua, Hermosillo, Los Mochis, Mazatlán, Puerto Vallarta |
| JSX | Dallas–Love, Los Angeles, Scottsdale |

=== Destination maps ===
Domestic destinations from Cabo San Lucas Intercontinental Airport
Red = Year-round destination
Blue = Future destination
Green = Seasonal destination
International destinations from Cabo San Lucas Intercontinental Airport
Red = Year-round destination
Blue = Future destination
Green = Seasonal destination

== Statistics ==
=== Busiest routes ===
Busiest routes from CSW (Jan–Dec 2025)
| Rank | City | Passengers |
|---|---|---|
| 1 | Los Mochis, Sinaloa | 9,886 |
| 2 | Mazatlán, Sinaloa | 7,861 |
| 3 | Puerto Vallarta, Jalisco | 4,572 |
| 4 | Chihuahua, Chihuahua | 2,010 |
| 5 | Hermosillo, Sonora | 1,394 |

== See also ==
- List of the busiest airports in Mexico
- List of airports in Mexico
- List of airports by ICAO code: M
- List of busiest airports in North America
- List of the busiest airports in Latin America
- Transportation in Mexico
- Tourism in Mexico
- Grupo Aeroportuario del Pacífico
- List of beaches in Mexico
- Los Cabos Corridor
- Cabo San Lucas
- Los Cabos International Airport
