= TAR Aerolíneas =

Regional airline of Mexico

TAR México
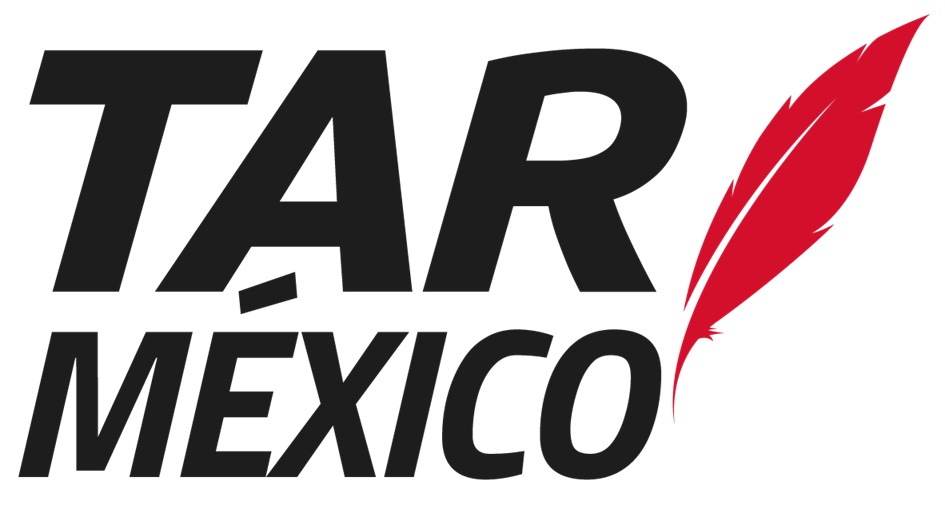

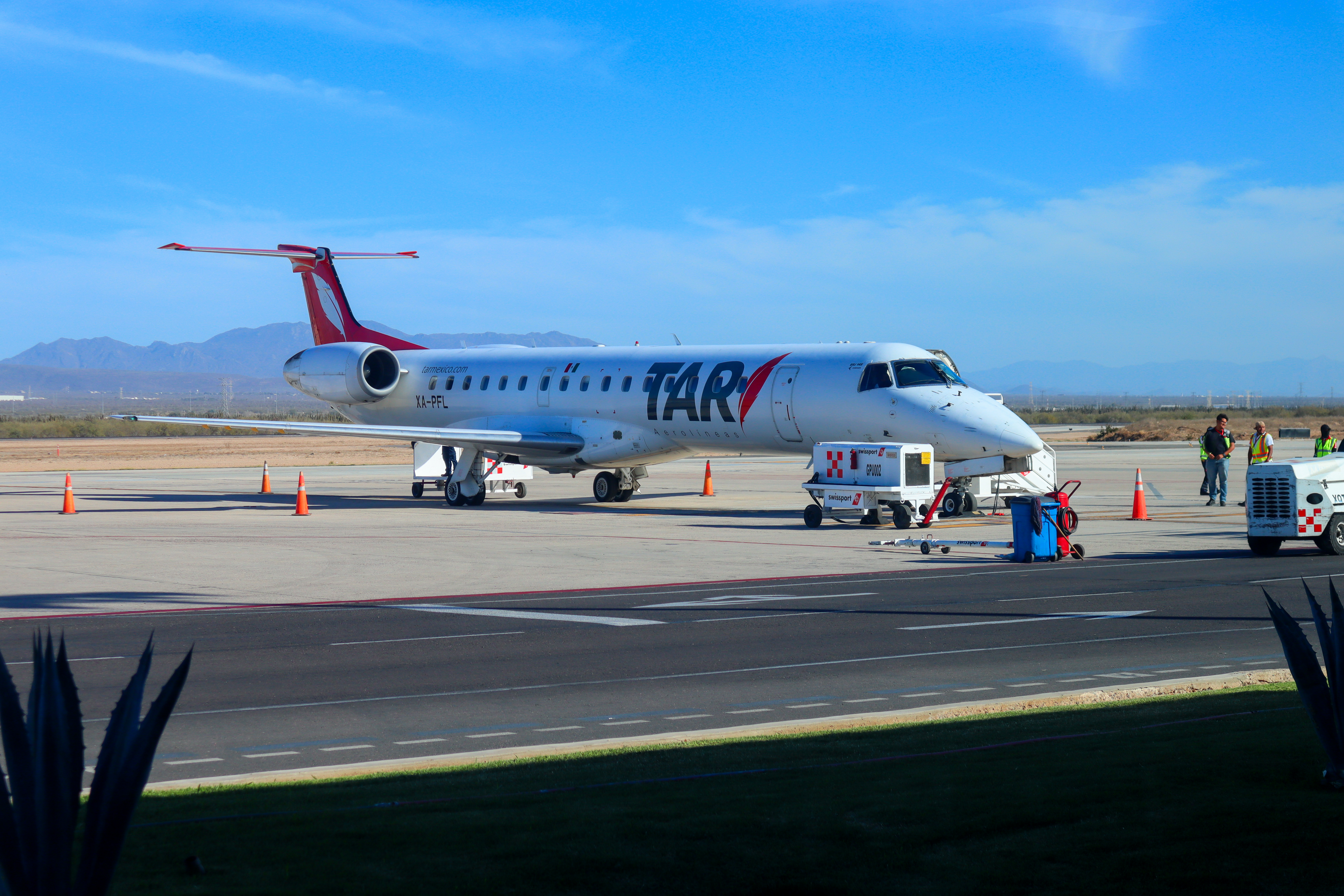
IATA	ICAO	Call sign
YQ	LCT	TAR
- Founded: April 12, 2012; 14 years ago
- Commenced operations: January 15, 2014; 12 years ago
- AOC #: 6LIF479F
- Hubs: Querétaro
- Focus cities: Chihuahua; La Paz; Hermosillo
- Frequent-flyer program: Star Club, Star Pass
- Fleet size: 9
- Destinations: 12
- Parent company: LINK Conexión Aérea S.A. de C.V.
- Headquarters: Querétaro, Querétaro, Mexico
- Website: www.tarmexico.com

Link Conexión Aérea, S.A. de C.V., operating as TAR México, previously TAR Aerolíneas, is a Mexican regional airline based in the city of Querétaro, the capital city of the homonymous state. It operates scheduled flights to 12 national destinations. Its inaugural flight occurred on March 3, 2014, between Querétaro and Guadalajara. The company currently operates a fleet of 12 Embraer ERJ 145s to 12 destinations throughout Mexico. Its headquarters and main operational base is in Querétaro, with Chihuahua, La Paz and Hermosillo serving as focus cities.

== History ==
TAR began in October 2011, owned by the MAFRA Group (Grupo MAFRA). In April 2012 the Mexican government granted permission to make scheduled regular flight services to Link Corporación Áerea. In September 2012, Link purchased three Embraer ERJ 145 jets, with a capacity of 50 passengers, to be delivered in February 2014, to begin scheduled flight services. The airline started services in March 2014, as TAR Aerolíneas with a direct flight between Quéretaro and Puerto Vallarta.

TAR's aim is to become the strongest regional airline in the country, with a cellular multiregional growth strategy. With the development of regional routes, TAR aims to develop a strong presence in different regions including the Yucatán Peninsula, the Gulf of México, the Mid North region, the Pacific, and the South.

It was announced in September 2016 that the airline will begin international service from Querétaro to San Antonio, Texas soon. However, there was no further information in regards to the service, to date.

In 2023, TAR has wet-leased two of its aircraft to the revived Mexicana, and is operating select flights on its behalf.

== Destinations ==
TAR Aerolineas serves the following destinations within Mexico:

Hub
Focus city
Future destination
Seasonal
Terminated destination

City	State	IATA	ICAO	Airport	Refs
Acapulco	MEX (Guerrero)	ACA	MMAA	Acapulco International Airport	
Cancún	MEX (Quintana Roo)	CUN	MMUN	Cancún International Airport	
Campeche	MEX (Campeche)	CPE	MMCP	Campeche International Airport	
Chihuahua	MEX (Chihuahua)	CUU	MMCU	Chihuahua International Airport	
Ciudad del Carmen	MEX (Campeche)	CME	MMCE	Ciudad del Carmen International Airport	
Ciudad Juárez	MEX (Chihuahua)	CJS	MMCS	Ciudad Juárez International Airport	
Ciudad Obregón	MEX (Sonora)	CEN	MMCN	Ciudad Obregón International Airport	
Colima	MEX (Colima)	CLQ	MMIA	Colima Airport	
Cuernavaca	MEX (Morelos)	CVJ	MMCB	Cuernavaca Airport	
Culiacán	MEX (Sinaloa)	CUL	MMCL	Culiacán International Airport	
Durango	MEX (Durango)	DGO	MMDO	Durango International Airport	
Guadalajara	MEX (Jalisco)	GDL	MMGL	Guadalajara International Airport	
Hermosillo	MEX (Sonora)	HMO	MMHO	Hermosillo International Airport	
Huatulco	MEX (Oaxaca)	HUX	MMBT	Bahías de Huatulco International Airport	
Ixtapa/Zihuatanejo	MEX (Guerrero)	ZIH	MMZH	Ixtapa-Zihuatanejo International Airport	
La Paz	MEX (Baja California Sur)	LAP	MMLP	La Paz International Airport	
León	MEX (Guanajuato)	BJX	MMLO	Del Bajío International Airport	
Los Mochis	MEX (Sinaloa)	LMM	MMLM	Los Mochis International Airport	
Manzanillo	MEX (Colima)	ZLO	MMZO	Playa de Oro International Airport	
Mazatlán	MEX (Sinaloa)	MZT	MMMZ	Mazatlán International Airport	
Mérida	MEX (Yucatán)	MID	MMMD	Mérida International Airport	
Mexicali	MEX (Baja California)	MXL	MMML	Mexicali International Airport	
Mexico City	MEX (Mexico City)	NLU	MMSM	Felipe Ángeles International Airport	
Monclova	MEX (Coahuila)	LOV	MMMV	Monclova International Airport	
Monterrey	MEX (Nuevo León)	MTY	MMMY	Monterrey International Airport	
Morelia	MEX (Michoacán)	MLM	MMMM	Morelia International Airport	
Oaxaca	MEX (Oaxaca)	OAX	MMOX	Oaxaca International Airport	
Puerto Escondido	MEX (Oaxaca)	PXM	MMPS	Puerto Escondido International Airport	
Puerto Peñasco	MEX (Sonora)	PPE	MMPE	Mar de Cortés International Airport	
Puerto Vallarta	MEX (Jalisco)	PVR	MMPR	Licenciado Gustavo Díaz Ordaz International Airport	
Querétaro	MEX (Querétaro)	QRO	MMQT	Querétaro Intercontinental Airport	
San Luis Potosí	MEX (San Luis Potosí)	SLP	MMSP	San Luis Potosí International Airport	
Saltillo	MEX (Coahuila)	SLW	MMIO	Saltillo Airport	
Tampico	MEX (Tamaulipas)	TAM	MMTM	Tampico International Airport	
Tepic	MEX (Nayarit)	TPQ	MMEP	Tepic International Airport	
Tijuana	MEX (Baja California)	TIJ	MMTJ	Tijuana International Airport	
Toluca	MEX (State of Mexico)	TLC	MMTO	Toluca International Airport	
Torreón	MEX (Coahuila)	TRC	MMTC	Torreón International Airport	
Tuxtla Gutiérrez	MEX (Chiapas)	TGZ	MMTG	Tuxtla Gutiérrez International Airport	
Veracruz	MEX (Veracruz)	VER	MMVR	Veracruz International Airport	
Villahermosa	MEX (Tabasco)	VSA	MMVA	Villahermosa International Airport	

== Fleet ==
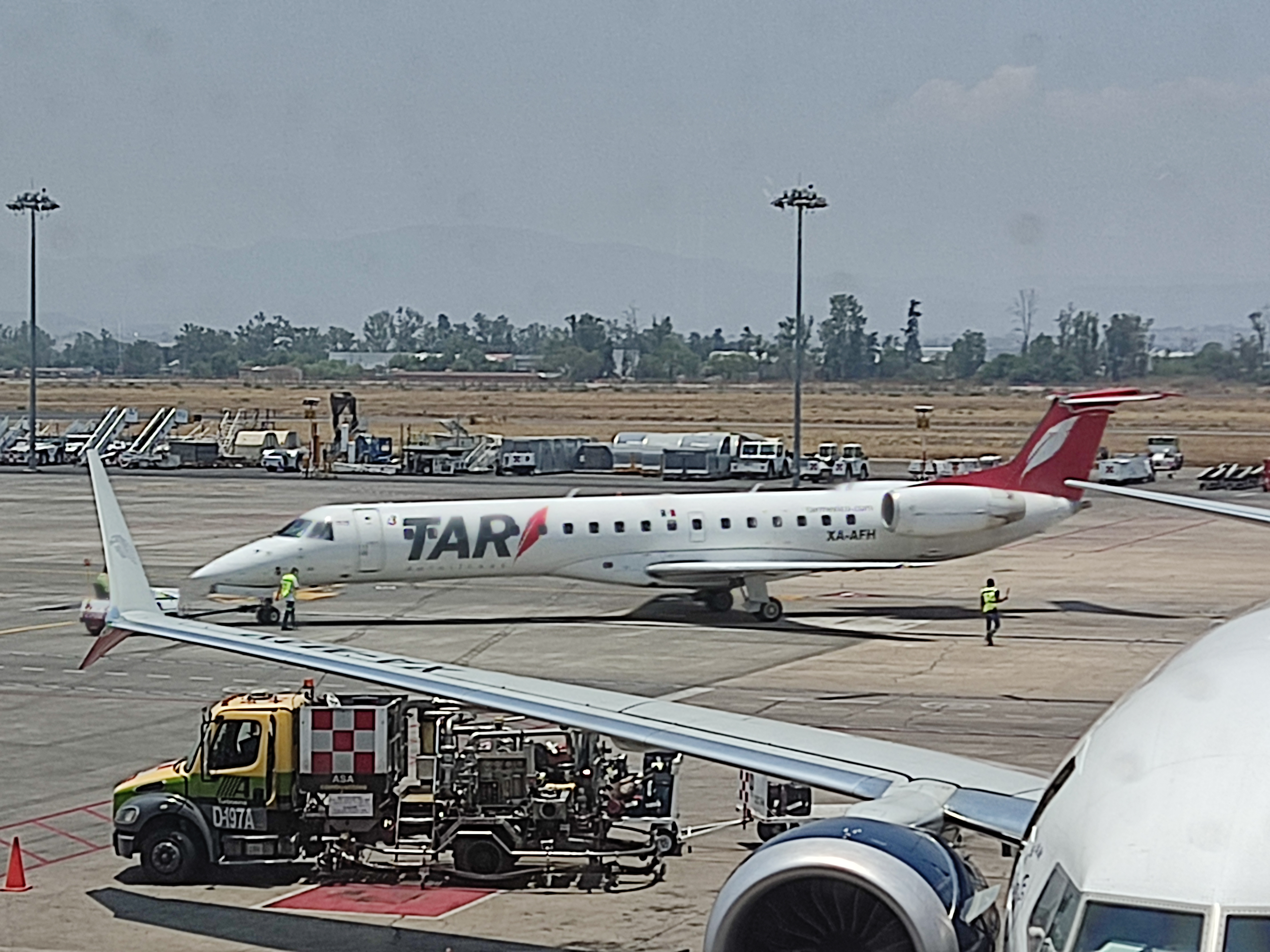
TAR Embraer ERJ 145LR

As of August 2025, TAR Aerolíneas operates the following aircraft:

Aircraft	In service	Orders	Passengers	Note
Embraer ERJ-145EP	2	—	50	
Embraer ERJ-145LR	7	—	50	
Total	9	—		

== See also ==
- List of active mexican airlines
- Lists of airlines
