= Villa Constitución Airport =

- IATA: ~~VIB~~; ICAO: none

Summary
- Airport type: Defunct
- Serves: ~~Ciudad Constitución~~
- Location: Ciudad Constitución
- Elevation AMSL: 49 m / 163 ft
- Coordinates: 25°03′19″N 111°41′17″W
- Interactive map of Villa Constitución Airport

Runways
Direction	Length		Surface
Direction	m	ft	Surface
~~13/31~~	~~1,053~~	~~3,456~~	~~asphalt~~

Villa Constitución Airport ~~(IATA: VIB)~~ is a former airfield located 3 kilometers north of the central business district (CBD) of Ciudad Constitución, Baja California Sur, Mexico. It once served as the main airport for Ciudad Constitución and Comondú Municipality. When a new airport was built 6 kilometers east of the city, the old airfield was repurposed for agricultural aviation. As of February 2025, the runway was full of cracks and overgrowth, and all buildings on the property were gone, implying that the facility is no longer used.
