= Chihuahua International Airport =

International airport in Chihuahua, Mexico

Chihuahua International Airport Aeropuerto Internacional de Chihuahua
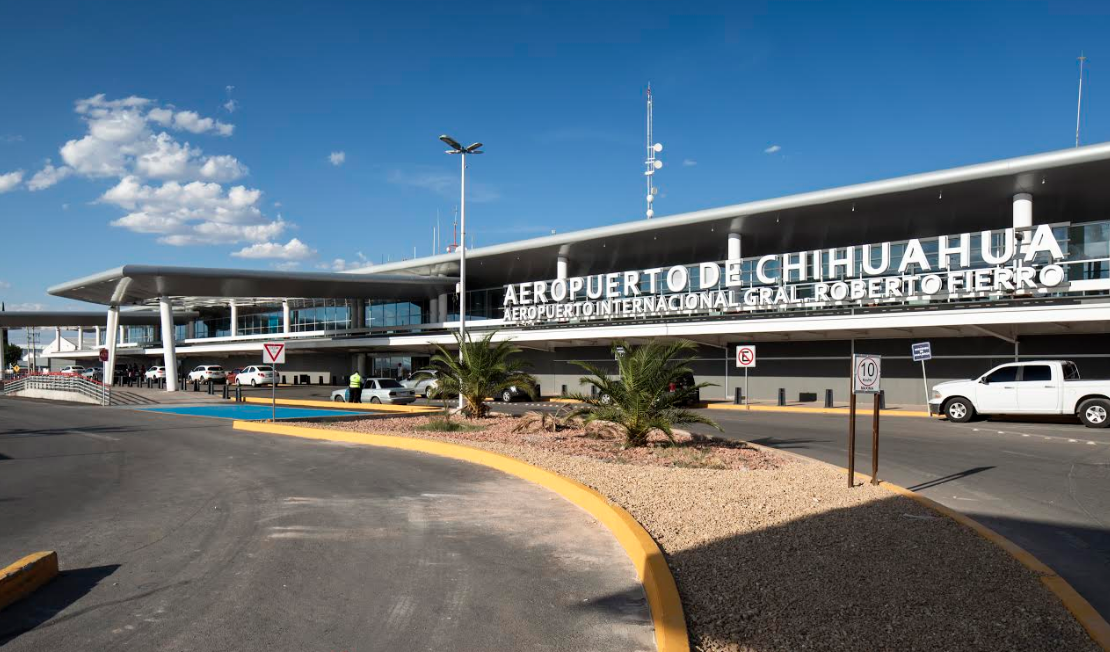
- IATA: CUU; ICAO: MMCU

Summary
- Airport type: Military/public
- Owner/Operator: Grupo Aeroportuario Centro Norte
- Serves: Chihuahua City, Chihuahua, Mexico
- Time zone: CST (UTC−06:00)
- Elevation AMSL: 1,330 m (4,360 ft)
- Coordinates: 28°42′10″N 105°57′42″W
- Website: www.oma.aero/en/passengers/chihuahua/

Map
- Location of the airport in Chihuahua CUU (Mexico)

Runways
Direction	Length		Surface
Direction	m	ft	Surface
04/22	1,100	3,609	Asphalt
18R/36L	2,403	7,885	Asphalt
18L/36R	2,600	8,530	Asphalt

Statistics (2025)
- Total passengers: 1,956,463
- Ranking in Mexico: 15th ▲1
- Source: Grupo Aeroportuario Centro Norte

Chihuahua International Airport (Spanish: Aeropuerto Internacional de Chihuahua); officially Aeropuerto Internacional General Roberto Fierro Villalobos (General Roberto Fierro Villalobos International Airport) (IATA: CUU, ICAO: MMCU) is an international airport located in Chihuahua, Mexico. It handles both national and international air traffic for the city of Chihuahua and is operated by Grupo Aeroportuario Centro Norte. The airport was named after Roberto Fierro Villalobos, an aviator pilot of the Mexican Air Force known for his role during the Mexican Revolution. In addition to serving national and international passengers, Chihuahua Airport accommodates military facilities for the Mexican Army and supports logistics and cargo airlines. It also facilitates various tourism, flight training, and general aviation activities.

This airport is one of the most isolated commercial airports in Mexico, as the nearest airport with passenger flights is located over 300 kilometres (190 mi) away in Ciudad Juárez. It is also one of the few airports in Mexico equipped with three runways, with the others located in Tampico and Mexico City-AIFA. In 2024, the airport served 1,850,857 passengers, and this number increased to 1,956,463 passengers in 2025.

== Facilities ==
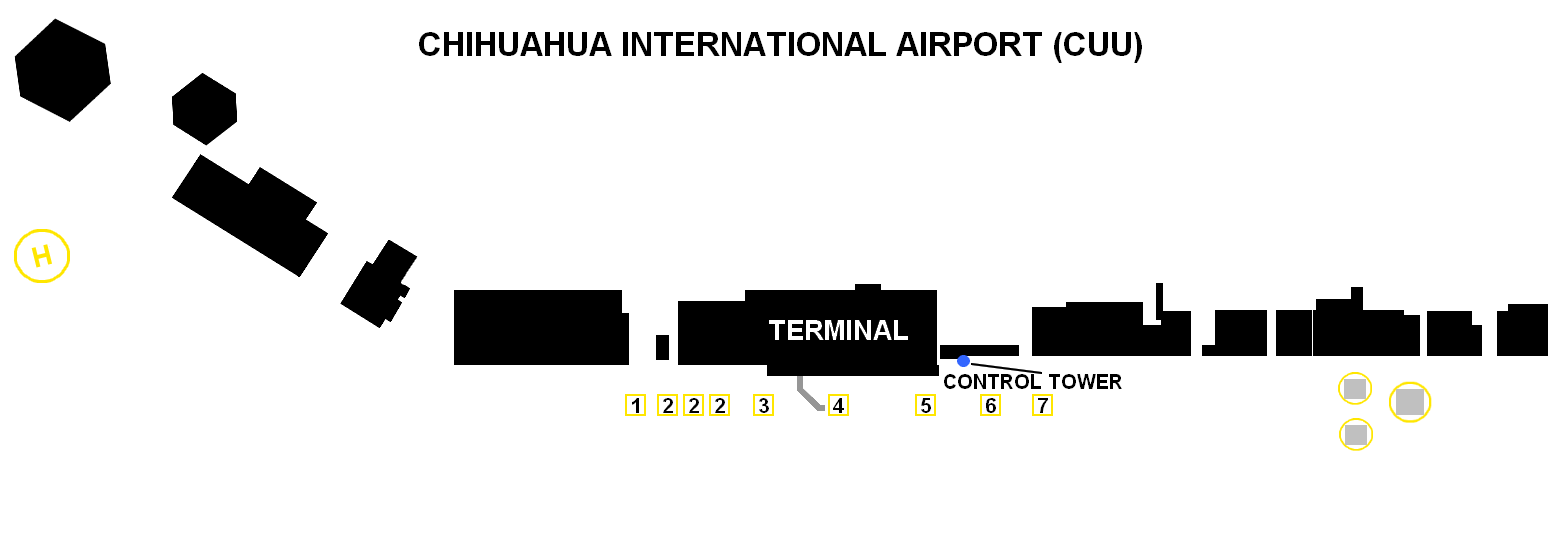
Facilities diagram

The airport is located 12 kilometres (7.5 mi) northeast of the city center, at an elevation of 1,330 metres (4,360 ft) above mean sea level. It features three asphalt-surfaced runways: Runway 18L/36R is the primary runway measuring 2,600 by 45 metres (8,530 by 148 ft). Runway 04/22 measures 1,100 by 30 metres (3,609 by 98 ft) in width, and Runway 18R/36L spans 2,400 by 20 metres (7,874 by 66 ft).

The commercial aviation apron features seven parking positions, while there are two general aviation aprons, known as the north and south aprons, designed to accommodate both fixed-wing aircraft and heliports for private aviation. Furthermore, there are additional parking spots at the cargo terminal with the operational capability to receive narrow-body aircraft.

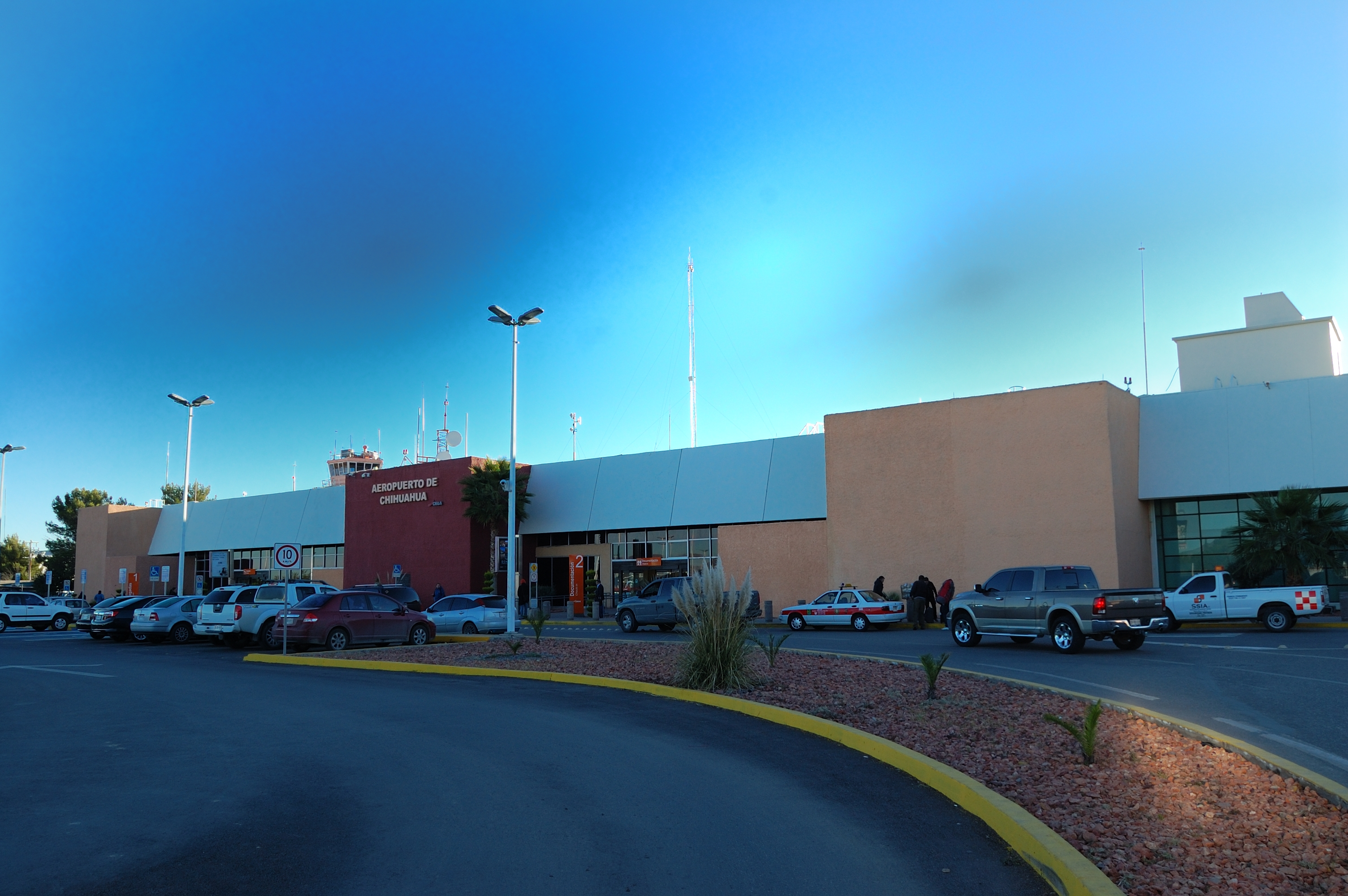
Terminal entrance

The passenger terminal is a single-story building that includes arrival and departure facilities for both domestic and international flights. It provides typical services found at a regional airport, such as check-in counters for domestic and international flights, a security checkpoint, migration and customs facilities, car rental services, taxi stands, and retail stores. The departure concourse offers seven gates and features a mezzanine from which three jet bridges facilitate passenger boarding. The terminal can handle 40 operations and up to 450 passengers per hour. It also houses two VIP lounges, one of which is Aeromexico's Premier Lounge. The parking facility offers both short-term and long-term parking spaces.

Chihuahua Airport is home to Air Force Base No. 13 (Spanish: Base Aérea Militar No. 13 Chihuahua, Chihuahua) (BAM-13). The base accommodates Air Squadron 110, which operates Cessna 182 aircraft, and Air Squadron 205 with Beechcraft T-6 Texan II aircraft. The base includes an aviation platform covering 14,500 square metres (156,000 sq ft), three hangars, and various facilities for the housing of Air Force personnel.

== Airlines and destinations ==
=== Passenger ===
Airlines	Destinations
Aeromexico	Mexico City–Benito Juárez
Aeroméxico Connect	Mexico City–Benito Juárez
American Eagle	Dallas/Fort Worth
Cabo Flight Center	Cabo San Lucas
Mexicana de Aviación	Mexico City–Felipe Ángeles
TAR Aerolíneas	Culiacán, Hermosillo, La Paz, Los Mochis, Queretaro, Torreón/Gómez Palacio
United Express	Houston–Intercontinental (resumes March 28, 2027)
Viva	Cancun, Guadalajara, Mazatlán, Mexico City–Benito Juárez, Mexico City–Felipe Ángeles, Monterrey
Volaris	Denver, Guadalajara, Mexico City–Benito Juárez, Tijuana

=== Destinations map ===
Domestic destinations from Chihuahua International Airport
Red = Year-round destination
Blue = Future destination
Green = Seasonal destination
International destinations from Chihuahua International Airport
Red = Year-round destination
Blue = Future destination
Green = Seasonal/charter destination

== Statistics ==
=== Annual Traffic ===
Passenger statistics at Chihuahua International Airport
Year	Total Passengers	change %
2000	562,590	Steady
2001	515,154	▼9.20%
2002	511,625	▼0.68%
2003	541,531	▲5.84%
2004	556,074	▲2.68%
2005	599,977	▲7.89%
2006	664,392	▲10.76 %
2007	854,757	▲28.65 %
2008	833,793	▼2.52 %
2009	745,165	▼11.89%
2010	828,123	▲11.13 %
2011	782,133	▼5.88%
2012	855,129	▲9.33 %
2013	885,659	▲3.57 %
2014	961,538	▲8.56 %
2015	1,110,513	▲15.49 %
2016	1,305,961	▲17.59 %
2017	1,409,579	▲7.93 %
2018	1,556,770	▲12.36%
2019	1,699,816	▲9.19%
2020	818,151	▼51.9%
2021	1,363,937	▲66.7%
2022	1,727,006	▲26.6%
2023	1,905,714	▲10.4%
2024	1,850,857	▼2.9%
2025	1,956,463	▲5.7%

=== Busiest routes ===
Busiest routes from CUU (Jan–Dec 2025)
Rank	Airport	Passengers
1	Mexico City, Mexico City	373,101
2	Monterrey, Nuevo León	135,361
3	Guadalajara, Jalisco	131,054
4	Tijuana, Baja California	80,667
5	Cancún, Quintana Roo	66,914
6	Dallas/Fort Worth, United States	54,420
7	Mexico City-AIFA, State of Mexico	48,560
8	Denver, United States	19,445
9	Mazatlán, Sinaloa	15,777
9	León/El Bajío, Guanajuato	7,780

== Accidents and incidents ==
Aeromexico Flight 230 ran off the runway on July 27, 1981. 30 people died.

== See also ==
- List of the busiest airports in Mexico
- List of airports in Mexico
- List of airports by ICAO code: M
- List of busiest airports in North America
- List of the busiest airports in Latin America
- Transportation in Mexico
- Tourism in Mexico
- Grupo Aeroportuario Centro Norte
- List of Mexican military installations
- Mexican Air Force
- Copper Canyon
