= Cabo Flight Center =

Mexican regional carrier airline

IATA	ICAO	Call sign
—	SEN<	SENIORAIR
- Commenced operations: December 8, 2023; 2 years ago
- Hubs: Cabo San Lucas International Airport
- Fleet size: 3
- Destinations: 6
- Headquarters: Cabo San Lucas, Baja California Sur, Mexico
- Website: www.caboflightcenter.com

Cabo Flight Center, formerly Señor Air is a Mexican regional carrier which launched scheduled operations on December 8, 2023. It is based in Cabo San Lucas International Airport. Operations started with one Embraer ERJ-135 aircraft, with an Embraer ERJ-145 expected to be delivered in 2024.

== Destinations ==
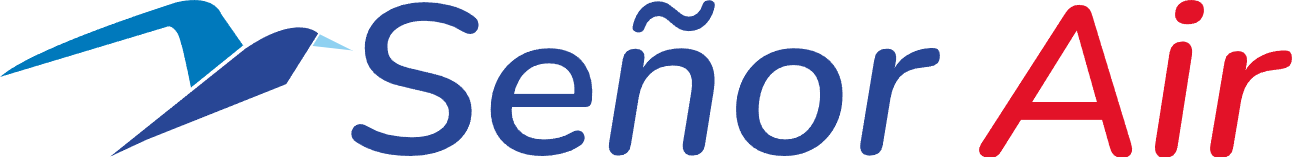
Señor Air logo used until 2025.

The airline started operating domestic flights in the Gulf of California area on December 8, 2023, serving Ciudad Obregón, Chihuahua, Los Mochis, Mazatlán and Puerto Vallarta from its hub in Cabo San Lucas. Mexico City-AIFA is listed as a future destination.

== Fleet ==
As of August 2025, Señor Air operates the following aircraft:

Aircraft	Total	Orders	Passengers	Notes
Embraer ERJ-135ER	2	—	37	
Embraer ERJ-145LR	1	—	50	
Total	3	—		

== See also ==
- List of active Mexican airlines
- Lists of airlines
