= La Paz International Airport =

International Airport in Baja California Sur, Mexico

La Paz International Airport Aeropuerto Internacional de La Paz
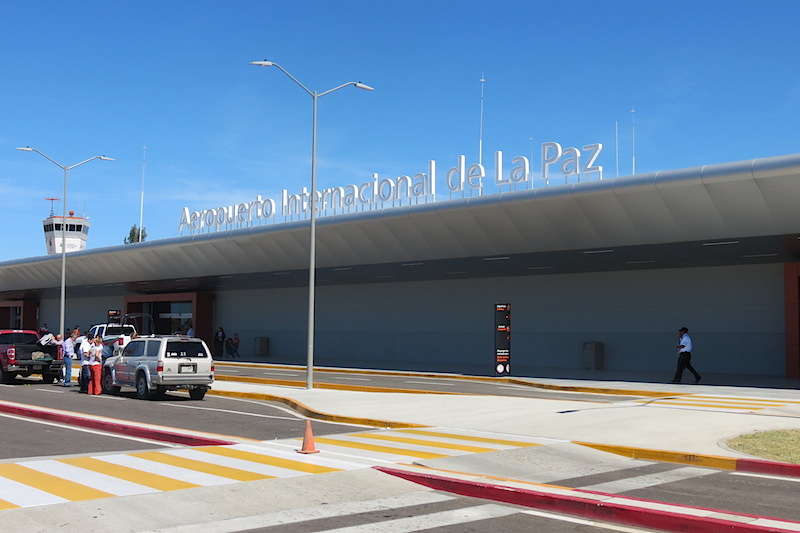
- IATA: LAP; ICAO: MMLP

Summary
- Airport type: Military/Public
- Owner/Operator: Grupo Aeroportuario del Pacífico
- Serves: La Paz, Baja California Sur, Mexico
- Time zone: MST (UTC-07:00)
- Elevation AMSL: 21 m (69 ft)
- Coordinates: 24°04′21″N 110°21′44″W
- Website: lapazairport.net

Map
- Location of the airport in Baja California Sur LAP (Mexico)

Runways
Direction	Length		Surface
Direction	m	ft	Surface
18/36	2,500	8,202	Concrete

Statistics (2025)
- Total passengers: 1,337,600
- Ranking in Mexico: 23rd ▲1
- Source: Grupo Aeroportuario del Pacífico

La Paz International Airport (Spanish: Aeropuerto Internacional de La Paz); officially Aeropuerto Internacional Manuel Márquez de León (Manuel Márquez de León International Airport) (IATA: LAP, ICAO: MMLP) is an international airport located in La Paz, Baja California Sur, Mexico, situated along the western shore of the Gulf of California. It serves as the primary air traffic gateway to the city of La Paz and is a focus city for the regional airline Calafia Airlines. The airport also accommodates military facilities for the Mexican Army and the Mexican Navy and supports various tourism, flight training, and general aviation activities.

Grupo Aeroportuario del Pacífico owns and operates the airport, and it is named in honor of Manuel Márquez de León, a Mexican politician, military leader, and intellectual originally from this state. The airport served as the headquarters and hub for Aero California from its foundation in 1960 until its bankruptcy in 2006.

The airport offers nonstop flights to many major cities in Mexico and numerous airports in Northwestern Mexico. It plays a significant role in a heavily traveled air corridor connecting the Baja California Peninsula to the mainland Mexico states of Sinaloa and Sonora. In 2022, the airport handled 1,079,600 passengers, marking the first time it reached the milestone of one million passengers in a year. Traffic increased to 1,337,600 passengers in 2025.

== Facilities ==
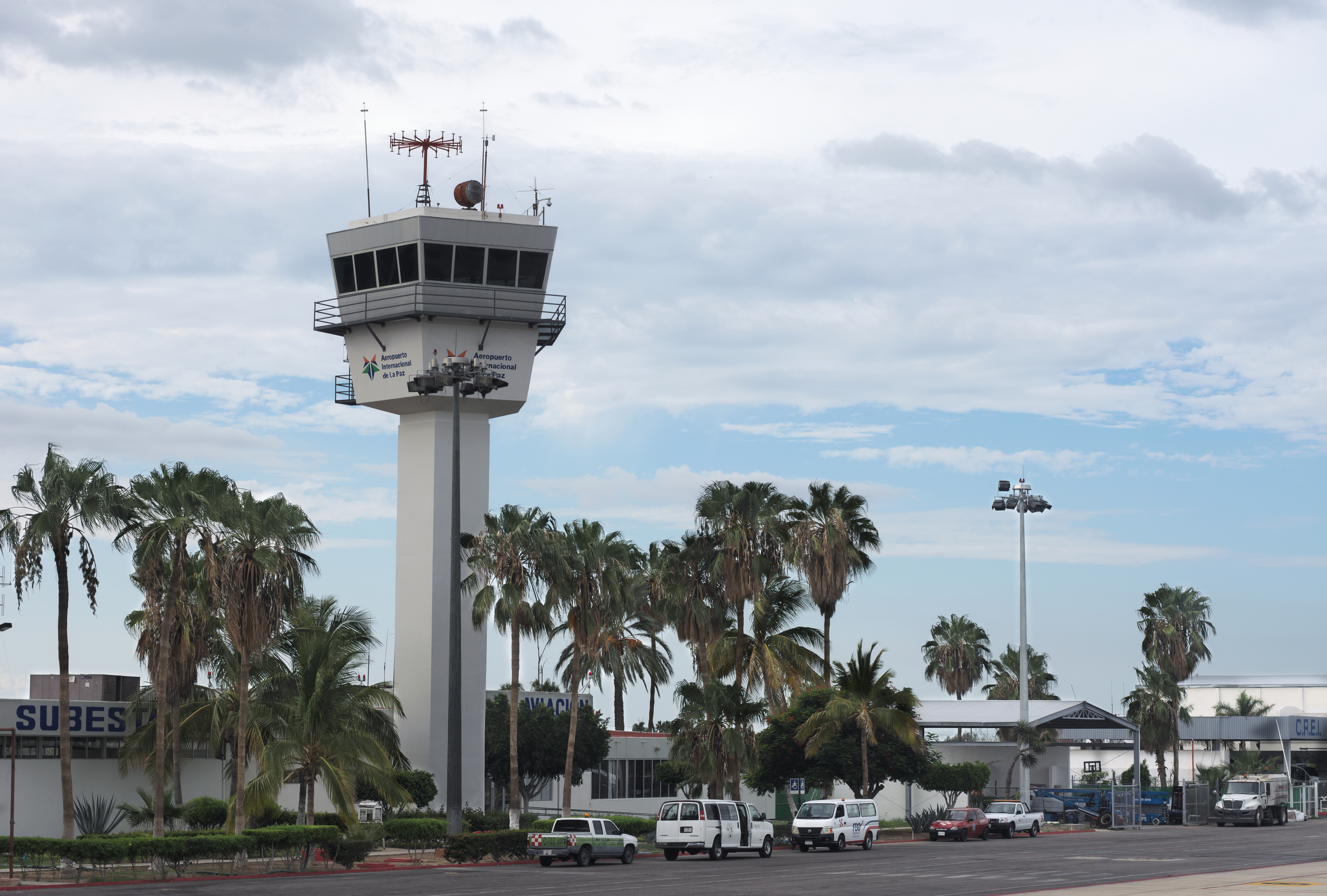
La Paz Airport control tower

The airport has a main runway 18/36 which is 2,500 metres (8,200 ft) long. The passenger terminal houses both arrival and departure facilities for domestic and international flights within a building with an area of 5,180 square metres (55,800 sq ft). It provides typical services found at a regional airport, including check-in counters for domestic and international flights, VIP lounges, parking areas, car rental services, taxi stands, and a departure concourse with three gates. The apron has nine stands capable of accommodating narrow-body aircraft. Additionally, the airport supports logistics and courier companies and has a separate terminal dedicated to general and executive aviation.

Air Force Base No. 9 (Spanish: Base Aérea Militar No. 9 La Paz, B.C.S.) (BAM-9) is situated to the west of the runway 18 end. This base includes an apron measuring 140 by 65 metres (459 by 213 ft), two hangars, and facilities for Mexican Air Force personnel. This air base is the home of Squadron 203, which currently operates Pilatus PC-7 Turbo Trainer aircraft.

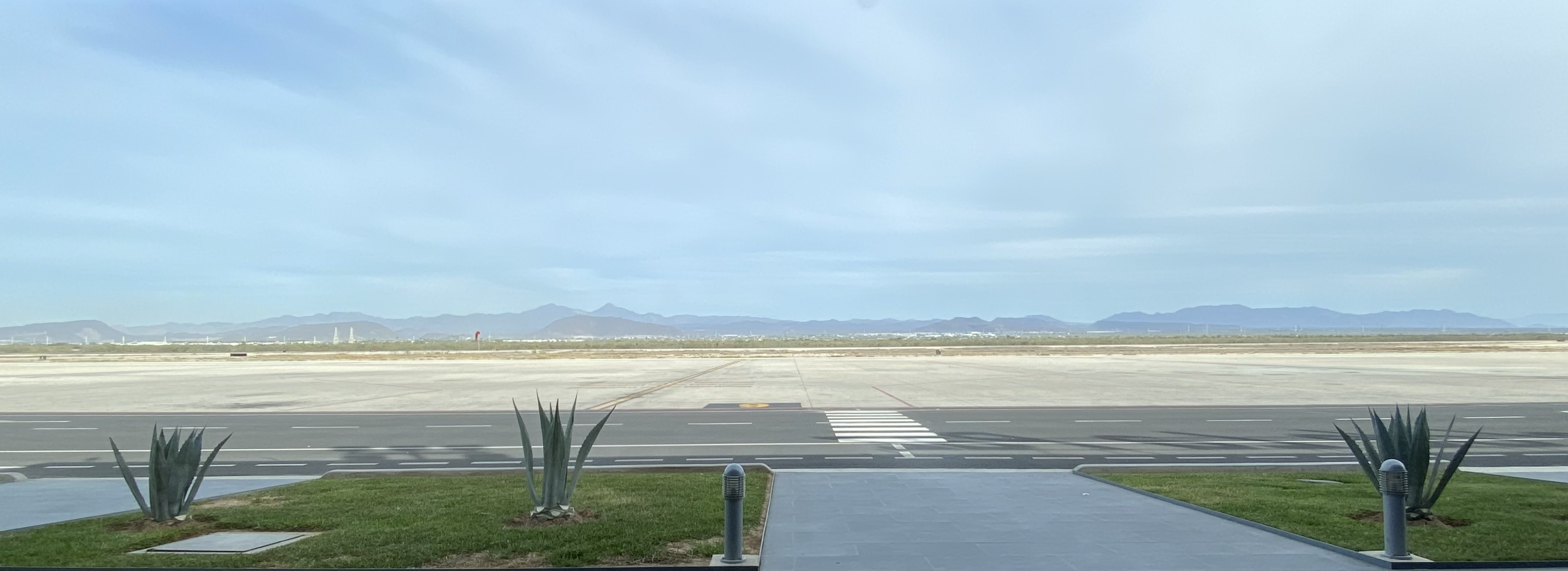
Aircraft parking position

La Paz Airport also accommodates La Paz Naval Air Base (Spanish: Base Aeronaval de La Paz), situated to the north of BAM-9. This base includes hangars, aircraft stands, and military facilities owned by the Mexican Navy. These facilities are also home to the School of Naval Aviation, which is part of the Center for Naval Aeronautical Studies.

La Paz Naval Air Base hosts the following units:

- 2nd Patrol Naval Air Squadron – operating RC695, Lancair IV-P
- 2nd Air Mobility, Observation and Transport Naval Air Squadron – operating Mi-8
- 2nd Shipborne Patrol Naval Air Squadron – operating Bo 105CBS-5
- 2nd Transport Naval Air Squadron – operating An-32B

== Airlines and destinations ==
=== Passenger ===
Airlines	Destinations
Aéreo Servicio Guerrero	Ciudad Obregón, Los Mochis
Aeroméxico	Mexico City–Benito Juárez
Aeroméxico Connect	Mexico City–Benito Juárez
Alaska Airlines	Los Angeles
TAR México	Aguascalientes, Chihuahua, Ciudad Juárez, Hermosillo, Los Mochis, Mazatlán, Querétaro
Viva	Culiacán, Guadalajara, Mexico City–Felipe Ángeles, Monterrey,^{1} Tijuana
Volaris	Guadalajara, Mexico City–Benito Juárez, Mexico City–Felipe Ángeles, Tijuana

==== Notes ====
^1Viva flight to Monterrey makes a stopover in Culiacán.

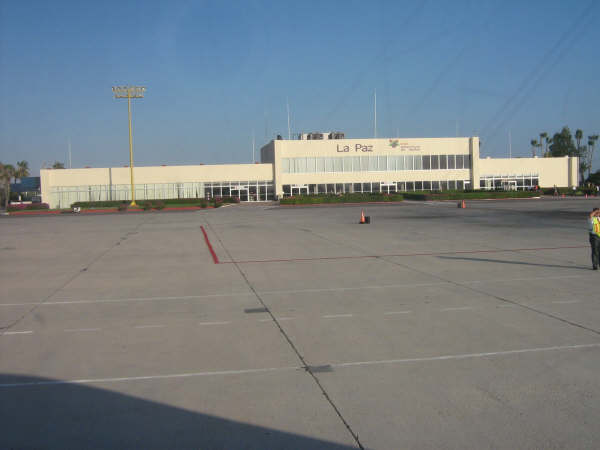
Passenger terminal airside

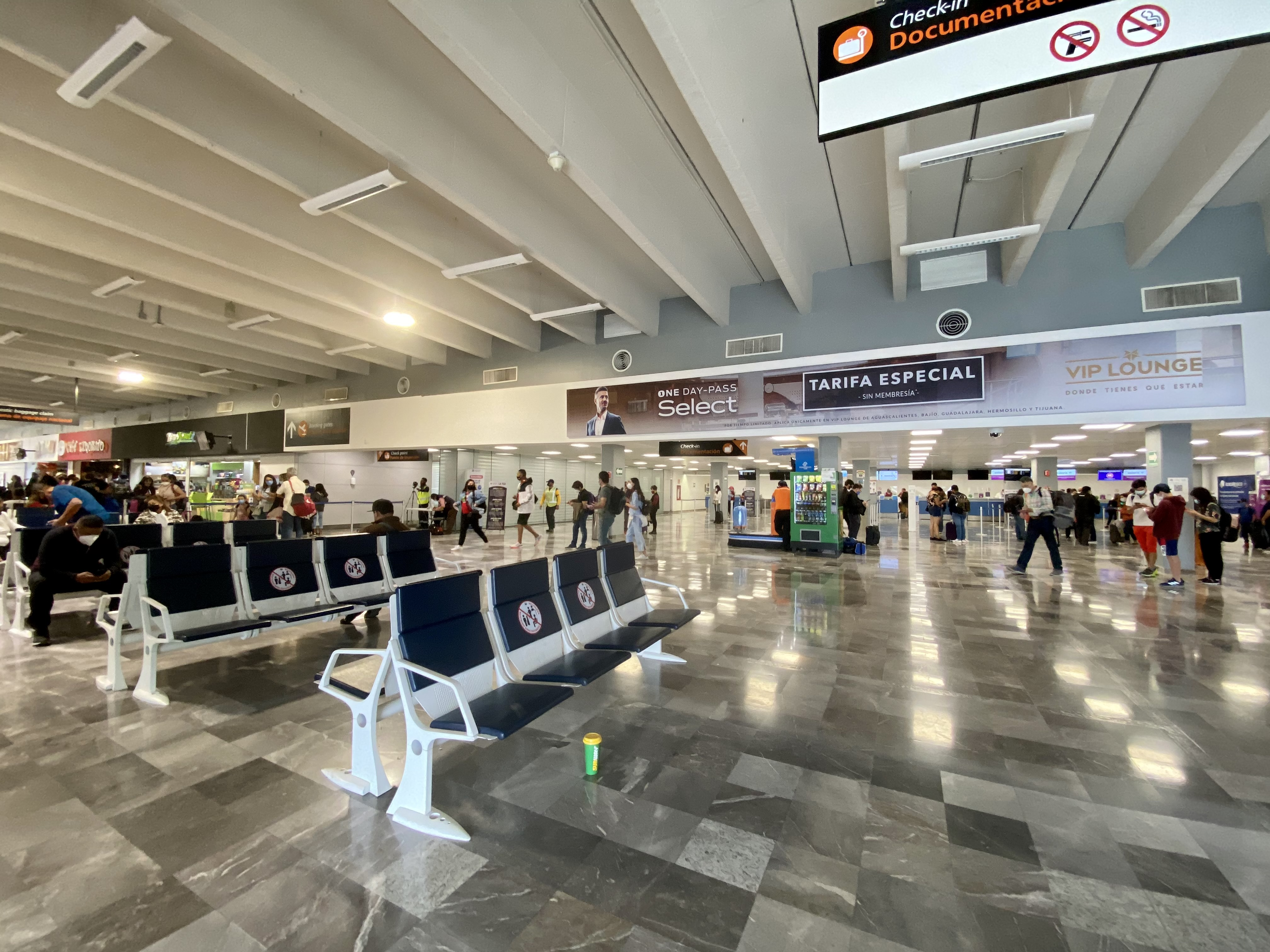
Departures concourse

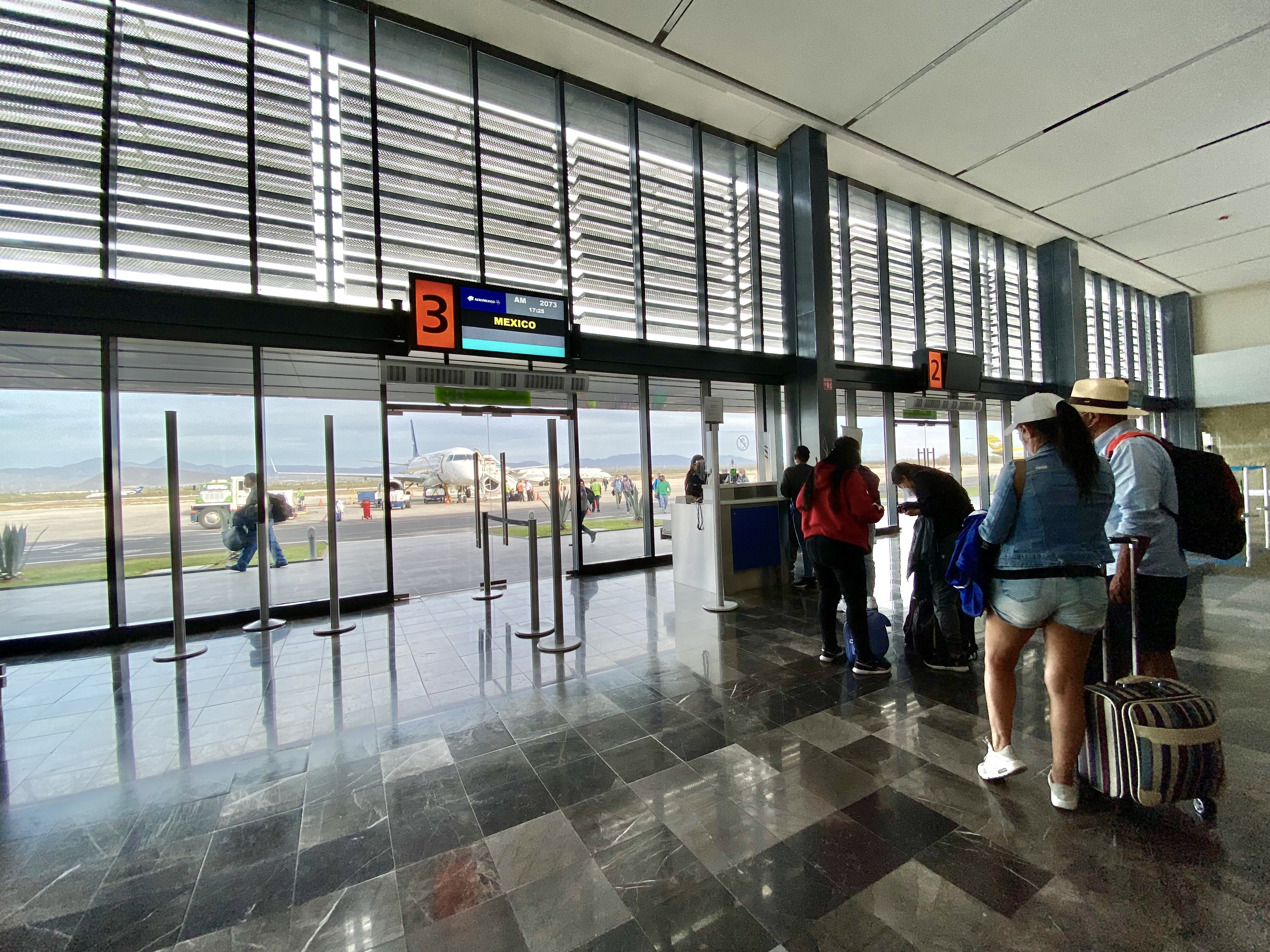
Gates area

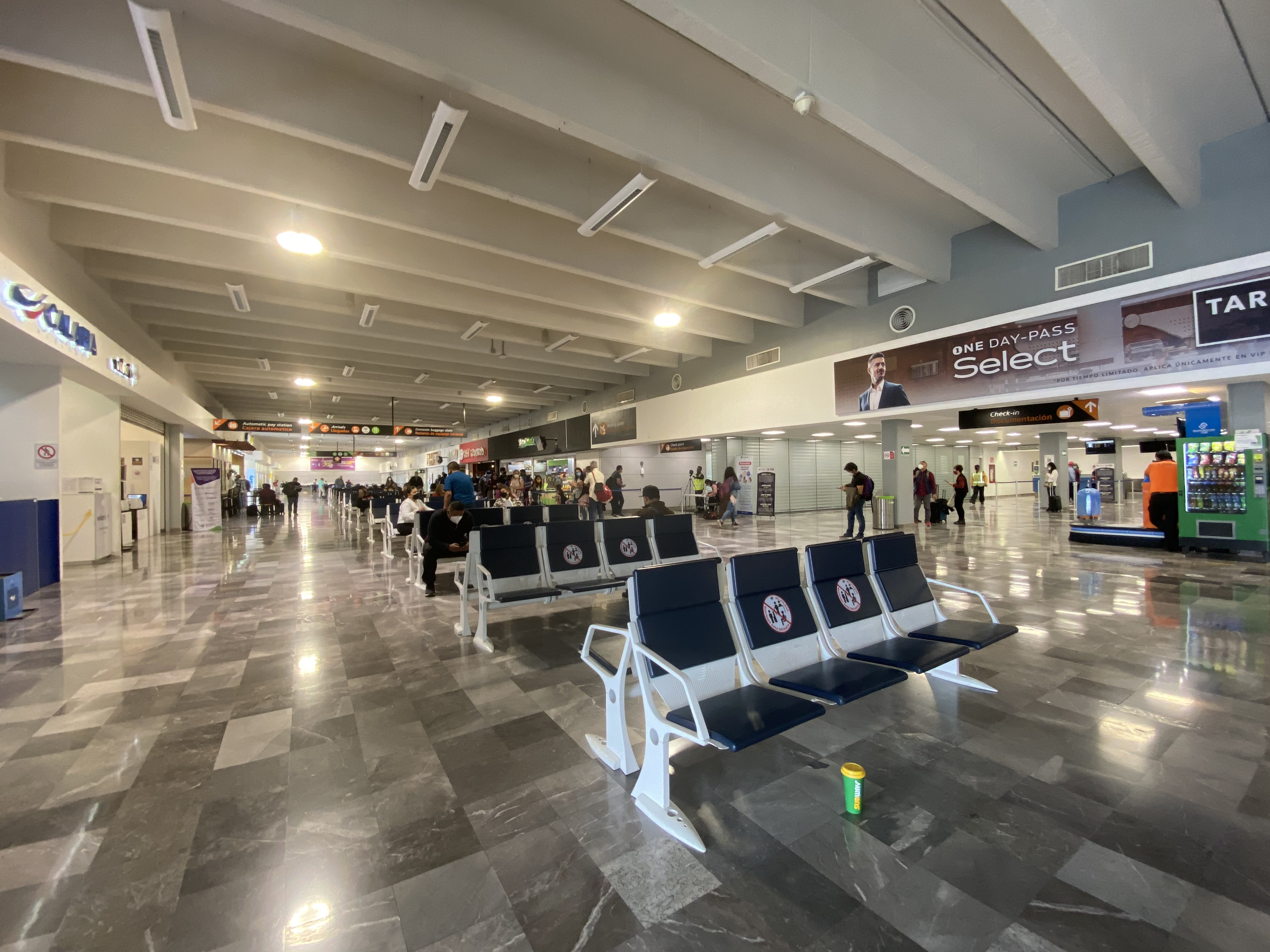
Arrivals hall

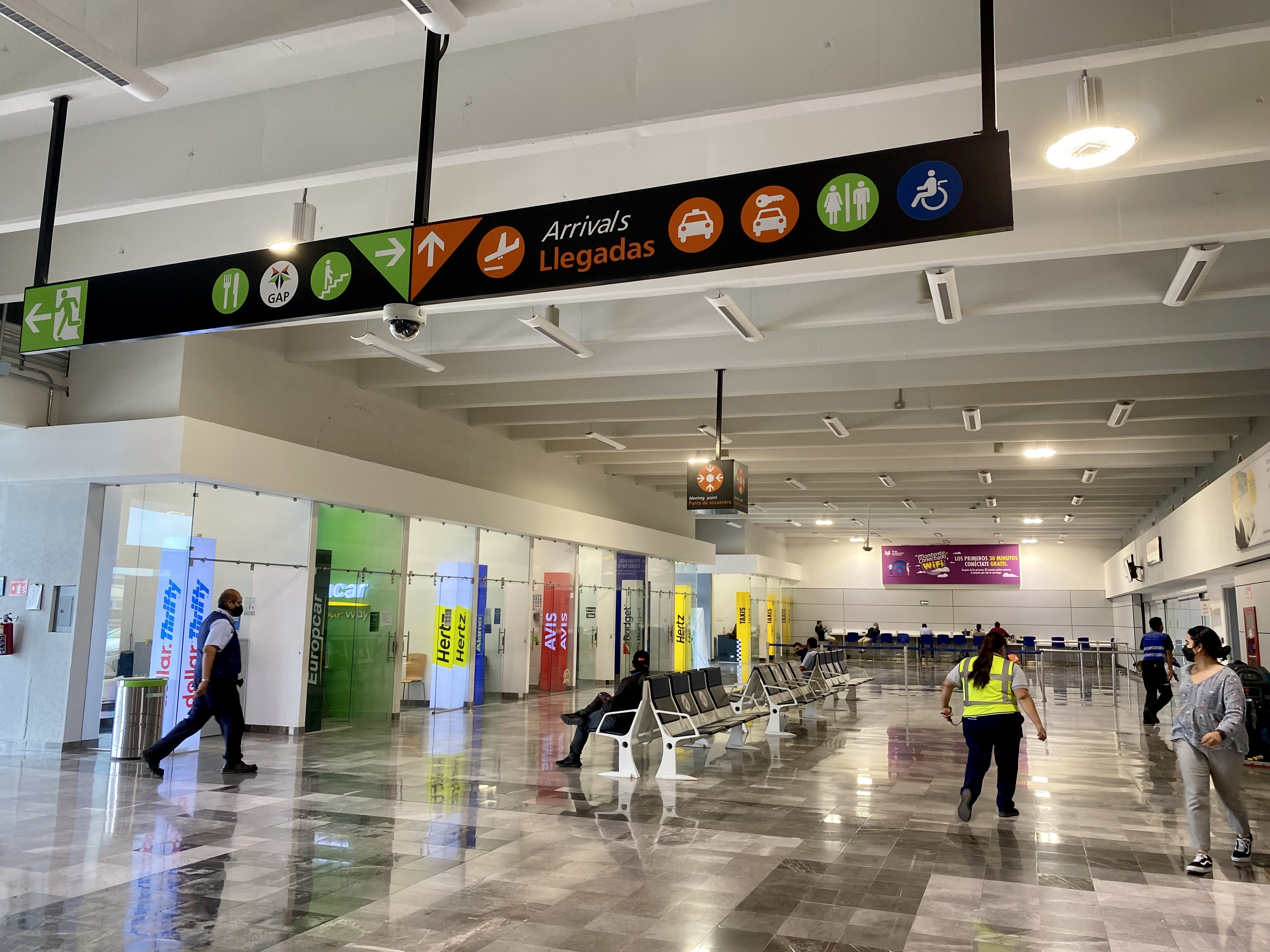
Arrivals hall

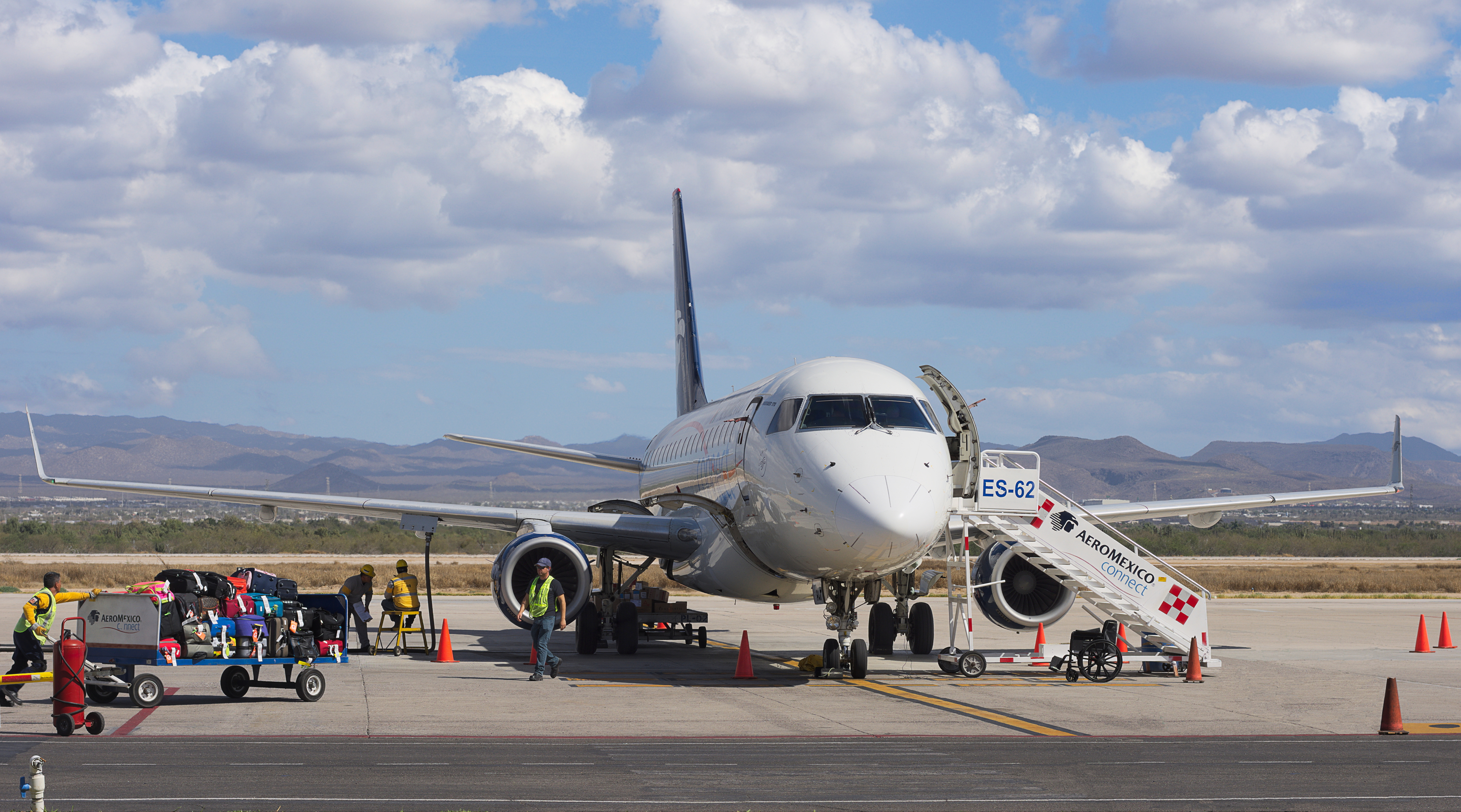
Aeromexico Embraer 170 at LAP

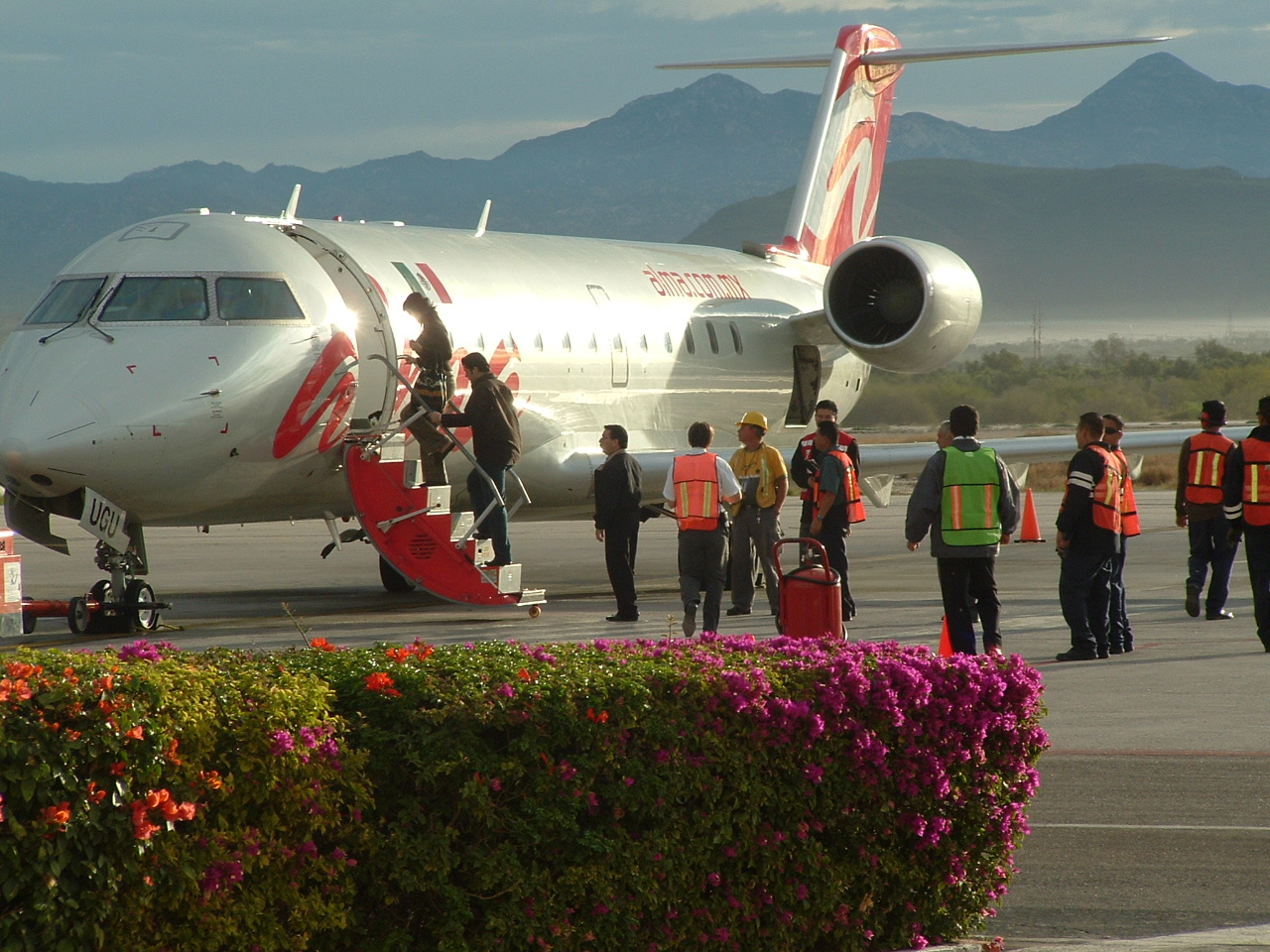
Defunct airline Alma Airlines Bombardier CRJ200 at LAP

=== Destinations map ===
Domestic destinations from La Paz International Airport
Red = Year-round destination
Blue = Future destination
Green = Seasonal destination

== Statistics ==
=== Busiest routes ===
Busiest routes from LAP (Jan–Dec 2025)
Rank	Airport	Passengers
1	Tijuana, Baja California	188,503
2	Mexico City, Mexico City	183,241
3	Guadalajara, Jalisco	139,944
4	Mexico City-AIFA, State of Mexico	52,326
5	Culiacán, Sinaloa	24,175
6	Monterrey, Nuevo León	20,987
7	Hermosillo, Sonora	12,966
8	Mazatlán, Sinaloa	12,441
9	Los Angeles, United States	11,394
10	Los Mochis, Sinaloa	3,920

== See also ==
- List of the busiest airports in Mexico
- List of airports in Mexico
- List of airports by ICAO code: M
- List of busiest airports in North America
- List of the busiest airports in Latin America
- Transportation in Mexico
- Tourism in Mexico
- Grupo Aeroportuario del Pacífico
- List of beaches in Mexico
- Jacques Cousteau Island
- Gulf of California
- List of Mexican military installations
- Mexican Air Force
- Mexican Naval Aviation
