= Los Mochis International Airport =

International airport in Los Mochis, Sinaloa, Mexico

Los Mochis International Airport Aeropuerto Internacional de Los Mochis
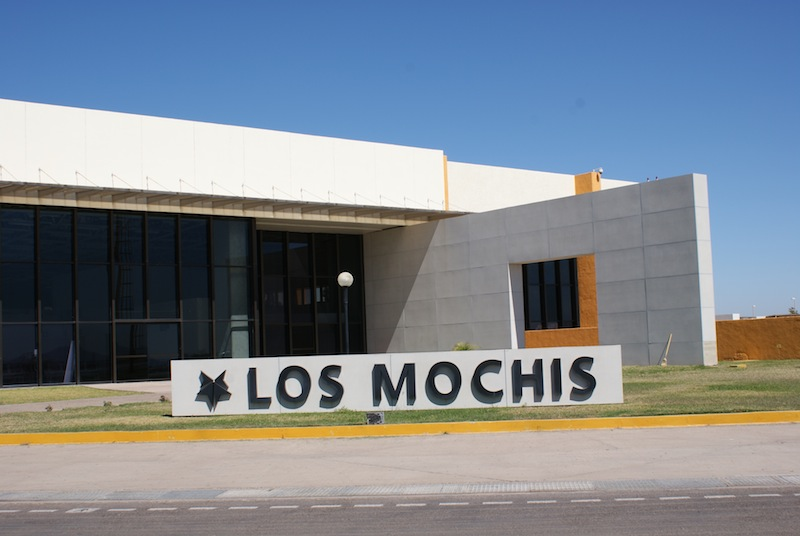
- IATA: LMM; ICAO: MMLM

Summary
- Airport type: Public
- Operator: Grupo Aeroportuario del Pacífico
- Serves: Los Mochis, Sinaloa, Mexico
- Time zone: MST (UTC-07:00)
- Elevation AMSL: 5 m (16 ft)
- Coordinates: 25°41′06″N 109°04′50″W
- Website: www.aeropuertosgap.com.mx/en/los-mochis-3.html

Map
- Location of airport in Sinaloa LMM (Mexico)

Runways
Direction	Length		Surface
Direction	m	ft	Surface
09/27	2,000	6,562	Asphalt

Statistics (2025)
- Total passengers: 713,600
- Ranking in Mexico: 33th ▲1
- Source: Grupo Aeroportuario del Pacífico

Los Mochis International Airport, (Spanish: Aeropuerto Internacional de Los Mochis); officially Aeropuerto Internacional Federal del Valle del Fuerte (Valle del Fuerte Federal International Airport) (IATA: LMM, ICAO: MMLM) is an international airport serving Los Mochis, Sinaloa, Mexico. The airport provides nonstop flights to various cities in Mexico and serves as a gateway in a heavily traveled air corridor connecting mainland Mexico to the Baja California peninsula. Additionally, it supports tourism, flight training, and general aviation activities. The airport is owned and operated by Grupo Aeroportuario del Pacífico. In 2024, it handled 585,200 passengers, and this number increased to 713,600 passengers in 2025.

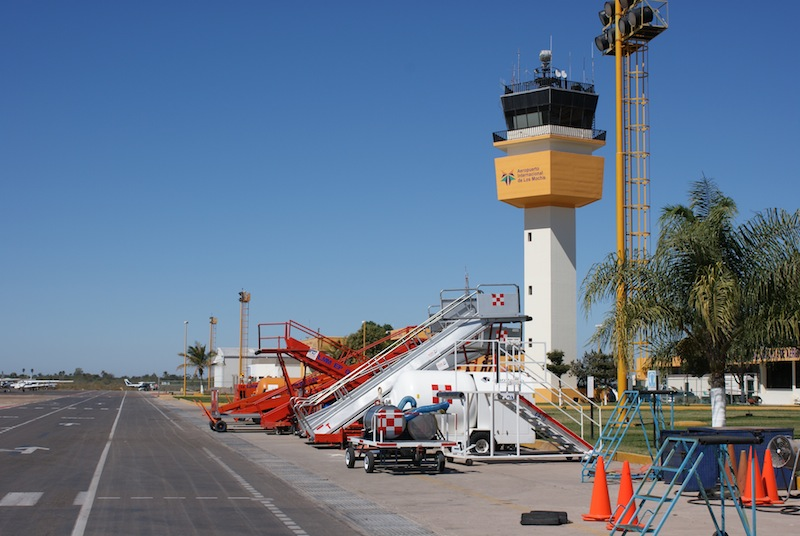
Control tower at Los Mochis Airport

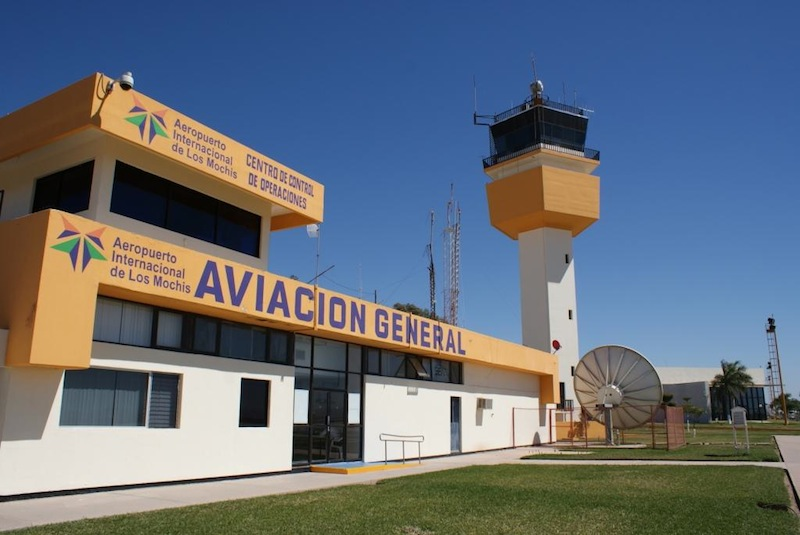
General aviation terminal

== Facilities ==
The airport is situated 18 kilometres (11 mi) south of Los Mochis, along the highway connecting Los Mochis and Topolobampo. The airport features a 2,000 metres (6,600 ft) asphalt runway with an orientation of 09/27. It is equipped with visual aids, VOR/DME navigation systems, as well as horizontal and vertical signage for both day and night operations. The apron provides parking for five narrow-body aircraft. The Control Tower frequency is 118.80 MHz, and the VOR/DME frequency is 115.5 MHz.

The terminal building offers essential services, including check-in areas, arrivals facilities, car rental services, a restaurant, ATMs, taxi stands, and a departures concourse with five gates. Adjacent to the terminal are parking areas, civil aviation hangars, and designated spaces for general aviation.

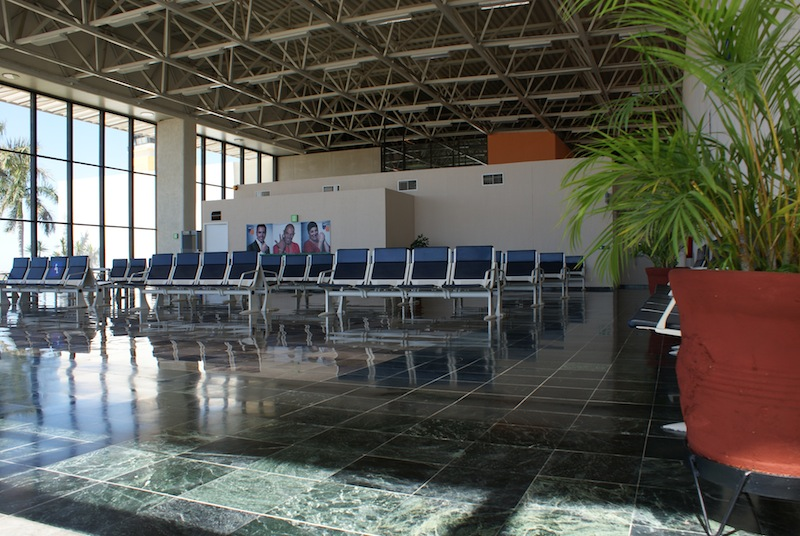
Departures concourse

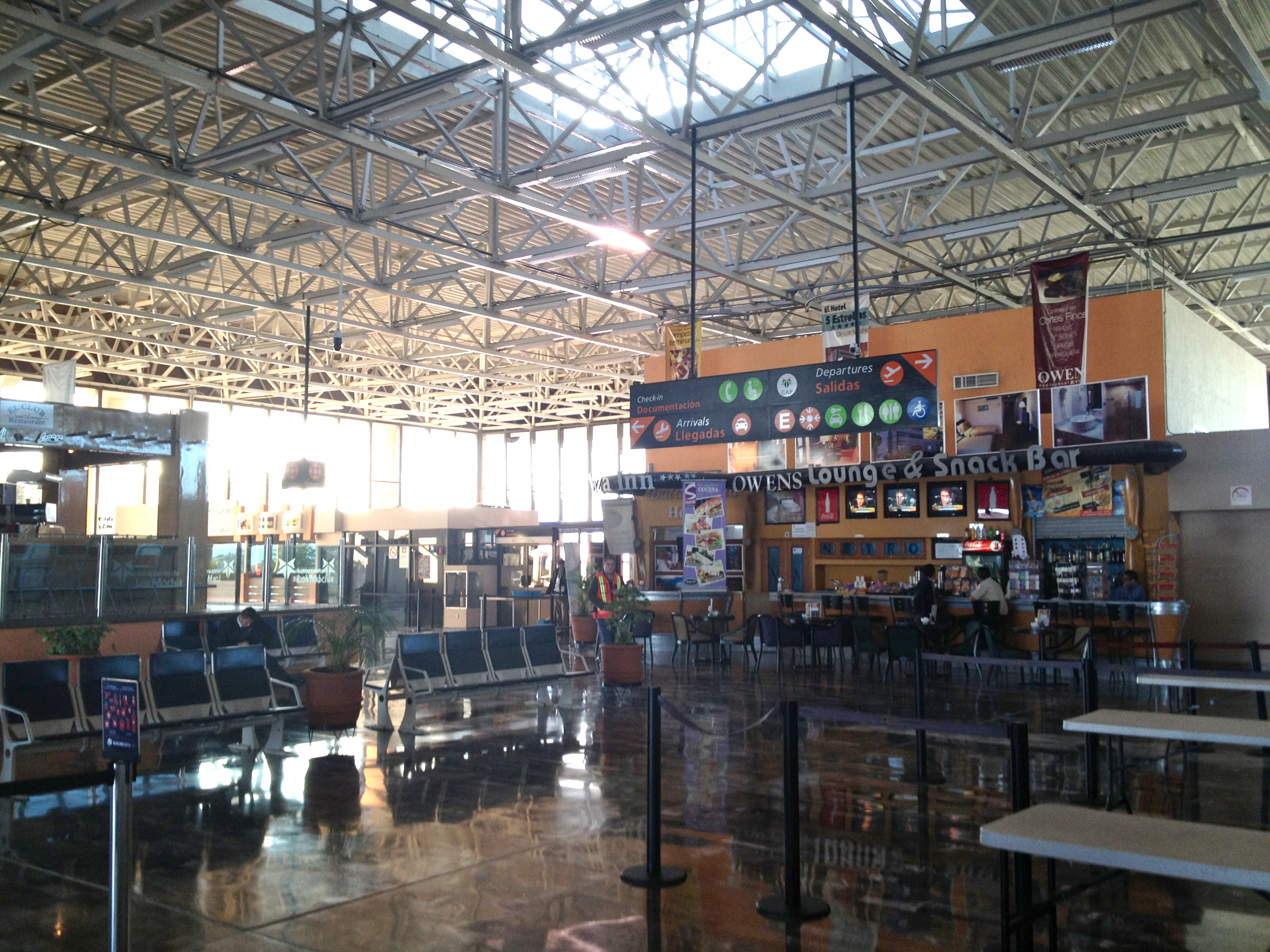
Passenger terminal main hall

== Airlines and destinations ==
=== Passenger ===
Airlines	Destinations
Aéreo Servicio Guerrero	Creel, La Paz, Loreto, San José del Cabo
Aeroméxico Connect	Mexico City–Benito Juárez
Cabo Flight Center	Cabo San Lucas
TAR México	Chihuahua, La Paz
Viva	Monterrey
Volaris	Guadalajara, Mexicali, Mexico City–Benito Juárez, Tijuana

=== Destinations map ===
Domestic destinations from Los Mochis International Airport
Red = Year-round destination
Blue = Future destination
Green = Seasonal destination

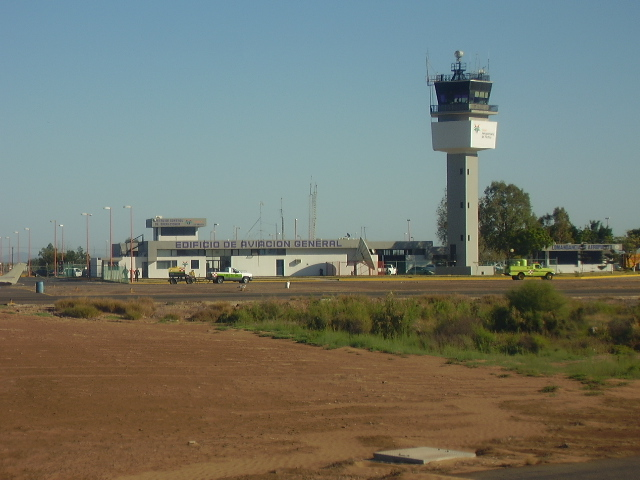
General aviation terminal and control tower

== Statistics ==
=== Annual Traffic ===
Passenger statistics at LMM
Year	Total Passengers	change %
2008	213,800	Steady
2009	206,000	▼3.65%
2010	243,000	▲17.96%
2011	205,800	▼15.31%
2012	183,500	▼10.80%
2013	196,800	▲7.20%
2014	228,600	▲16.16%
2015	290,900	▲27.2%
2016	347,400	▲19.4%
2017	348,500	▲0.3%
2018	273,068	▼2.53%
2019	319,236	▲16.91%
2020	213,600	▼45.4%
2021	367,700	▲72.1%
2022	424,000	▲15.3%
2023	470,700	▲11.0%
2024	585,200	▲24.3%
2025	713,600	▲21.9%

=== Busiest routes ===
Busiest routes at LMM (Jan–Dec 2025)
Rank	Airport	Passengers
1	Tijuana, Baja California	117,499
2	Mexico City, Mexico City	92,449
3	Guadalajara, Jalisco	56,519
4	Monterrey, Nuevo León	41,856
5	Mexicali, Baja California	20,416
6	Cabo San Lucas, Baja California Sur	10,180
7	Mexico City–AIFA, State of Mexico	4,034
8	Chihuahua, Chihuahua	4,023
9	La Paz, Baja California Sur	3,518
10	Toluca, State of Mexico	30

== See also ==
- List of the busiest airports in Mexico
- List of airports in Mexico
- List of airports by ICAO code: M
- List of busiest airports in North America
- List of the busiest airports in Latin America
- Transportation in Mexico
- Tourism in Mexico
- Grupo Aeroportuario del Pacífico
