= Isla de Cedros Airport =

Airfield in Cedros Island, Baja California, Mexico

Isla de Cedros Airport Aeropuerto de Isla de Cedros
- IATA: none; ICAO: MMCD; LID: ICD

Summary
- Airport type: Public
- Operator: Exportadora de Sal S.A.
- Serves: Cedros Island, Baja California, Mexico
- Time zone: PST (UTC-08:00)
  - Summer (DST): PDT (UTC-07:00)
- Elevation AMSL: 30 m (98 ft)
- Coordinates: 28°02′15″N 115°11′22″W

Map
- Location of airport in Baja California MMCD (Mexico)

Runways
Direction	Length		Surface
Direction	m	ft	Surface
15/33	1,420	4,659	Asphalt

Statistics (2025)
- Total passengers: N/A
- Source: Agencia Federal de Aviación Civil

Isla de Cedros Airport (Spanish: Aeropuerto de Isla de Cedros) (ICAO: MMCD, FAA LID: ICD) is a small airstrip located 9 kilometres (9.0 km) south of Cedros, the largest town on Cedros Island, Baja California, Mexico— the largest Mexican island in the Pacific Ocean. It manages commuter air traffic, connecting communities such as Cedros, El Morro, San Agustín, and La Colorada to mainland Mexico.

Operated by Exportadora de Sal S.A., the largest company in the region, the airport is situated at an elevation of 30 metres (98 ft) above mean sea level. The facility features a single asphalt runway, designated as 15/33, measuring 1,420 metres (4,660 ft). Additional infrastructure includes an apron and a small terminal building.

== Airlines and destinations ==
=== Passenger ===
Airlines	Destinations
Aéreo Servicio Guerrero	Ensenada, Guerrero Negro

=== Destinations map ===
Destinations from Isla de Cedros Airport
Red = Year-round destination
Blue = Future destination
Green = Seasonal destination

== See also ==
- List of the busiest airports in Mexico
- List of airports in Mexico
- List of airports by ICAO code: M
- List of busiest airports in North America
- List of the busiest airports in Latin America
- Transportation in Mexico
- Tourism in Mexico
- Exportadora de Sal S.A.
- Cedros Island
- Aereo Servicios Guerrero
