= Guerrero Negro Airport =

Airfield serving Guerrero Negro, Baja California Sur, Mexico

Guerrero Negro Airport Aeropuerto de Guerrero Negro
- IATA: GUB; ICAO: MMGR; LID: GRN

Summary
- Airport type: Public
- Operator: Exportadora de Sal S.A.
- Serves: Guerrero Negro, Baja California Sur, Mexico
- Location: San Quintín Municipality, Baja California, Mexico
- Time zone: PST (UTC-08:00)
  - Summer (DST): PDT (UTC-07:00)
- Elevation AMSL: 18 m / 59 ft
- Coordinates: 28°01′33″N 114°01′26″W

Map
- Location of airport in Baja California GRN (Mexico)

Runways
Direction	Length		Surface
Direction	m	ft	Surface
12/30	2,199	7,215	Asphalt

Statistics (2025)
- Total passengers: N/A
- Source: Agencia Federal de Aviación Civil

Guerrero Negro Airport (Spanish: Aeropuerto de Guerrero Negro) (IATA: GUB, ICAO: MMGR) is an airport situated in the municipality of San Quintín, Baja California, Mexico. The facility serves regional flights and supports general aviation activities in Guerrero Negro, Baja California Sur, Mexico.

Operated by Exportadora de Sal S.A., the largest company in the region, the airport is located at an elevation of 18 metres (59 ft) above mean sea level. The airport features a single asphalt runway, designated as 12/30, with a length of 2,200 metres (7,200 ft). Additional infrastructure includes an apron, hangars, and a small terminal building.

Air Force Station No. 2 (Spanish: Estación Aérea Militar N.º 2 Guerrero Negro) (E.A.M. No. 2) is situated on the airport grounds. This station does not currently have active squadrons assigned to it. It includes a small apron, one hangar, and other facilities designed to accommodate Air Force personnel.

== Airlines and destinations ==
=== Passenger ===
Airlines	Destinations
Aéreo Servicio Guerrero	Ensenada, Guaymas, Hermosillo, Isla de Cedros

=== Destinations map ===
Destinations from Guerrero Negro Airport
Red = Year-round destination
Blue = Future destination
Green = Seasonal destination

== Accidents and incidents ==
- On 20 December 1997, Douglas C-47 XA-CUC of Aerolíneas California Pacífico crashed near Guerrero Negro on a flight from Guerrero Negro Airport to Isla de Cedros Airport, Cedros, Baja California.

== See also ==
- List of the busiest airports in Mexico
- List of airports in Mexico
- List of airports by ICAO code: M
- List of busiest airports in North America
- List of the busiest airports in Latin America
- Transportation in Mexico
- Tourism in Mexico
- Exportadora de Sal S.A.
- Aereo Servicios Guerrero
