= Ciudad Obregón International Airport =

Airport in Ciudad Obregón, Sonora, Mexico

Ciudad Obregón International Airport Aeropuerto Internacional de Ciudad Obregón
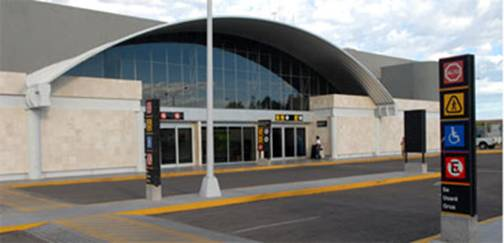
- IATA: CEN; ICAO: MMCN

Summary
- Airport type: Public
- Operator: Aeropuertos y Servicios Auxiliares
- Serves: Ciudad Obregón, Sonora, Mexico
- Time zone: MST (UTC−07:00)
- Elevation AMSL: 62 m (203 ft)
- Coordinates: 27°23′33″N 109°49′59″W
- Website: www.aeropuertosasa.mx/CEN

Map
- Location of airport in Sonora CEN (Mexico)

Runways
Direction	Length		Surface
Direction	m	ft	Surface
13/31	2,300	7,546	Asphalt

Statistics (2025)
- Total passengers: 531,343
- Ranking in Mexico: 38th ▲2
- Source: Agencia Federal de Aviación Civil

Ciudad Obregón International Airport (Spanish: Aeropuerto Internacional de Ciudad Obregón) (IATA: CEN, ICAO: MMCN) is an international airport located in Cajeme Municipality, Sonora, Mexico. The airport manages air traffic for the metropolitan area of nearby Ciudad Obregón and southern Sonora. It offers domestic flights within Mexico and supports various tourism, flight training, and general aviation activities. Operated by Aeropuertos y Servicios Auxiliares, a federal government-owned corporation, Ciudad Obregón Airport handled 438,717 passengers in 2024, increasing to 531,343 in 2025.

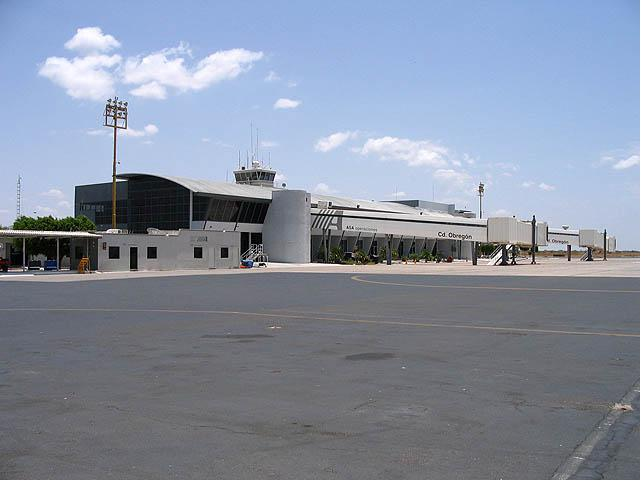
Passenger terminal airside

== Facilities ==
The airport is located 15 kilometres (9.3 mi) southeast of Ciudad Obregón's city center, covering an area of 385 hectares (950 acres). Situated at an elevation of 62 metres (203 ft) above mean sea level, Ciudad Obregón's Airport features a runway measuring 2,300 square metres (25,000 sq ft) and an apron of 17,325 square metres (186,480 sq ft). The apron features two stands capable of accommodating narrow-body aircraft and smaller general aviation aircraft.

The passenger terminal is a two-story building. The lower-level houses the check-in area, an arrivals hall with a baggage claim area, immigration and customs facilities, car rental services, and taxi stands. The upper floor hosts the security checkpoint and a departures concourse that includes a commercial area, a VIP lounge, and three gates, two of which have jet bridges. Adjacent to the terminal are additional facilities, including civil aviation hangars and designated spaces for general aviation. The official operating hours are from 6:00 to 18:00.

== Airlines and destinations ==
=== Passenger ===
Airlines	Destinations
Aéreo Servicio Guerrero	Ciudad Constitución, La Paz, San José del Cabo
Aeroméxico Connect	Mexico City–Benito Juárez
Viva	Mexico City–Felipe Ángeles, Monterrey
Volaris	Guadalajara, Tijuana

=== Destinations map ===
Domestic destinations from Ciudad Obregón International Airport
Red = Year-round destination
Blue = Future destination
Green = Seasonal destination

== Statistics ==
=== Annual Traffic ===
Passenger statistics at CEN
Year	Total Passengers	change %	Cargo movements (t)	Air operations
2006	154,466	Steady	291	15,131
2007	163,655	▲5.95%	431	16,347
2008	167,663	▲2.45%	543	16,491
2009	187,554	▲11.86%	1,102	16,618
2010	215,340	▲14.81%	1,297	18,164
2011	211,472	▼1.80%	674	14,351
2012	181,806	▼14.03%	207	11,465
2013	191,242	▲5.19%	255	10,779
2014	214,992	▲12.42%	240	10,258
2015	245,492	▲14.19%	324	10,801
2016	256,573	▲4.51%	306	10,694
2017	303,405	▲18.25%	362	10,975
2018	338,316	▲11.5%	452	11,578
2019	373,337	▲10.35%	526	10,605
2020	215,145	▼42.37%	324	7,733
2021	355,302	▲65.15%	287	10,191
2022	430,276	▲21.10%	294	9,950
2023	426,724	▼0.82%	323	9,358
2024	438,717	▲2.83%	348	8,786
2025	531,343	▲21.11%	383	8,587

=== Busiest routes ===
Busiest routes from CEN (Jan–Dec 2025)
Rank	Airport	Passengers
1	Tijuana, Baja California	72,441
2	Guadalajara, Jalisco	72,032
3	Mexico City, Mexico City	49,676
4	Monterrey, Nuevo León	37,814
5	Mexico City–AIFA, State of Mexico	23,298

== See also ==
- List of the busiest airports in Mexico
- List of airports in Mexico
- List of airports by ICAO code: M
- List of busiest airports in North America
- List of the busiest airports in Latin America
- Transportation in Mexico
- Tourism in Mexico
- Aeropuertos y Servicios Auxiliares
