= Aéreo Servicio Guerrero =

Mexican regional airline

Aéreo Servicios Guerrero
IATA	ICAO	Call sign
—	GUE	AERO GUERRERO
- Founded: 1997; 29 years ago
- Operating bases: Hermosillo International Airport
- Fleet size: 6
- Destinations: 15
- Headquarters: Hermosillo, Mexico
- Website: www.asg.com.mx

Aéreo Servicio Guerrero S.A. de C.V. is a Mexican regional airline founded in 1997, based in the Hermosillo International Airport.

It operates air taxi services as well as scheduled flights to the Baja California Peninsula, Sonora and Sinaloa with a fleet of Cessna aircraft.

== Destinations ==
Aéreo Servicio Guerrero operates flights to 15 destinations in northwestern Mexico.

Hub
Seasonal destination
Future destination
Terminated destination

City	State	IATA	ICAO	Airport	Ref
Cabo San Lucas	(Mexico) (Baja California Sur)	CSL	MMSL	Cabo San Lucas International Airport	
Cedros Island	(Mexico) (Baja California)	CDI	MMCD	Isla de Cedros Airport	
Ciudad Constitución	(Mexico) (Baja California Sur)	CUA	MMDA	Ciudad Constitución Airport	
Ciudad Obregón	(Mexico) (Sonora)	CEN	MMCN	Ciudad Obregón International Airport	
Creel	(Mexico) (Chihuahua)		MMGA	Creel Regional Airport	
Culiacán	(Mexico) (Sinaloa)	CUL	MMCL	Culiacán International Airport	
Ensenada	(Mexico) (Baja California)	ESE	MMES	Ensenada Airport	
Guaymas	(Mexico) (Sonora)	GYM	MMGM	Guaymas International Airport	
Guerrero Negro	(Mexico) (Baja California Sur)	GUB	MMGR	Guerrero Negro Airport	
Hermosillo	(Mexico) (Sonora)	HMO	MMHO	Hermosillo International Airport	
Nogales	(Mexico) (Sonora)	NOG	MMNG	Nogales International Airport (Mexico)	
La Paz	(Mexico) (Baja California Sur)	LAP	MMLP	La Paz International Airport	
Loreto	(Mexico) (Baja California Sur)	LTO	MMLT	Loreto International Airport	
Los Mochis	(Mexico) (Sinaloa)	LMM	MMLM	Los Mochis International Airport	
Tepic	(Mexico) (Nayarit)	TPQ	MMEP	Tepic International Airport	
Puerto Peñasco	(Mexico) (Sonora)	PPE	MMPE	Mar de Cortés International Airport	
Puerto Balleto	(Mexico) (Nayarit)		MM40	Maria Madre Island Naval Air Station	
Santa Rosalía	(Mexico) (Baja California Sur)	SRL	CIB	Palo Verde Airport	
San José del Cabo	(Mexico) (Baja California Sur)	SJD	MMSD	Los Cabos International Airport	
Tijuana	(Mexico) (Baja California)	TIJ	MMTJ	Tijuana International Airport	

== Fleet ==
The airline operates various aircraft:

- 5 Cessna 208B XA-TSB, XA-UJF, XA-ASG, XA-ASC, XA-ASA
- 1 Cessna 402B XA-TUT

== Incidents and accidents ==
- On the 27th May 2011, one of Aéreo Servicio Guerrero's Cessna 208B Grand Caravan aircraft (XA-UJF) overran the runway during landing at Cabo San Lucas International Airport (MMSL) suffering significant damage. Three of the twelve occupants received minor injuries. https://asn.flightsafety.org/wikibase/122811
- On 14 October 2013, one of Aéreo Servicio Guerrero's Cessna 208B Grand Caravan aircraft (registration XA-TXM) impacted terrain approximately 16 miles (26 km) west of Loreto International Airport after departing on a scheduled commercial passenger service to Ciudad Constitución Airport. According to news sources, Tropical Storm Octave was nearby at the time, and may have been to blame. All 14 people on board died in the incident, which is only in the preliminary stages of investigation

== See also ==
- List of active mexican airlines
- Lists of airlines
