= Ciudad Constitución Airport =

International airport serving Ciudad Constitución, Baja California Sur, Mexico

Ciudad Constitución National Airport Aeropuerto Nacional de Ciudad Constitución
- IATA: CUA; ICAO: MMDA; LID: CCB

Summary
- Airport type: Public
- Owner: Comondú Municipality
- Operator: Aereo Servicio Guerrero
- Serves: Ciudad Constitución, Baja California Sur, Mexico
- Location: Comondú Municipality, Baja California Sur, Mexico
- Time zone: MST (UTC−07:00)
- Elevation AMSL: 65 m / 213 ft
- Coordinates: 25°03′14″N 111°36′54″W

Map
- Location of airport in Baja California CUA (Mexico)

Runways
Direction	Length		Surface
Direction	m	ft	Surface
12/30	1,600	5,249	Asphalt

Statistics (2023)
- Total passengers: N/A
- Source: Agencia Federal de Aviación Civil

Ciudad Constitución National Airport (Spanish: Aeropuerto Nacional de Ciudad Constitución); officially Aeropuerto Nacional Capitán Jaime Emilio Real Cossio (Capitain Jaime Emilio Real Cossio National Airport) (IATA: CUA, ICAO: MMDA) is an airfield situated 6 kilometres (3.7 mi) east of Ciudad Constitución, Baja California Sur, Mexico. The airport primarily caters to regional flights and general aviation activities for Ciudad Constitución. Owned by the Municipality of Comondú Government, the airport has been operated by the regional airline Aereo Servicio Guerrero since 2007, providing commuter flights within the region. The airport is named after Jaime Emilio Real Cossio, a distinguished aviator pilot born in Villa Constitución.

== Facilities ==
The current Ciudad Constitución Airport, located 6 kilometres (3.7 mi) east of the city, replaced the previous airport situated 7 kilometres (4.3 mi) to the west. Situated at an elevation of 65 metres (213 ft) above mean sea level, the airport features a single asphalt runway, designated as 12/30, measuring 1,600 by 25 metres (5,249 by 82 ft). The apron is equipped with parking positions for small aircraft.

A small single-story terminal building caters to both domestic arrivals and departures facilities with direct access to the apron, allowing passengers to board their planes by walking to the aircraft. Adjacent facilities include a parking area and a hangar for general aviation.

== Airlines and destinations ==
=== Passenger ===
Airlines	Destinations
Aereo Servicio Guerrero	Ciudad Obregón

=== Destinations map ===
Destinations from Ciudad Constitución National Airport
Red = Year-round destination
Blue = Future destination
Green = Seasonal destination

== See also ==
- List of the busiest airports in Mexico
- List of airports in Mexico
- List of airports by ICAO code: M
- List of busiest airports in North America
- List of the busiest airports in Latin America
- Transportation in Mexico
- Tourism in Mexico
