= Ensenada Airport =

Air Force Base and regional airport serving Ensenada, Baja California, Mexico

Ensenada International Airport Aeropuerto Internacional de Ensenada
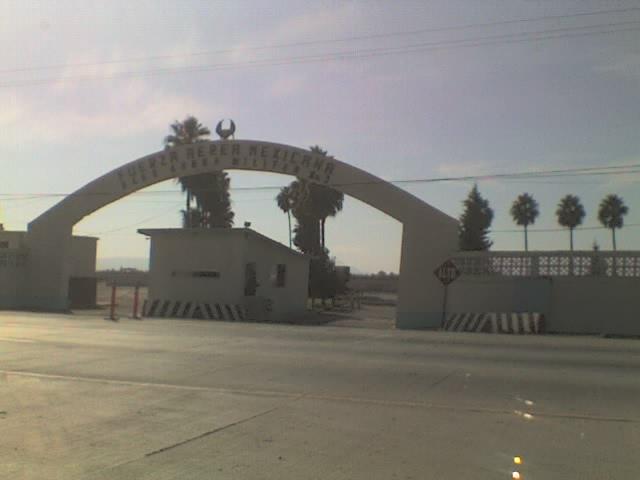
- IATA: ESE; ICAO: MMES; LID: ENS

Summary
- Airport type: Military/Public
- Operator: Secretariat of National Defense
- Serves: Ensenada, Baja California, Mexico
- Built: 1942
- Time zone: PST (UTC−08:00)
  - Summer (DST): PDT (UTC−07:00)
- Elevation AMSL: 20 m / 66 ft
- Coordinates: 31°47′43″N 116°36′09″W

Map
- Location of airport in Baja California ESE (Mexico)

Runways
Direction	Length		Surface
Direction	m	ft	Surface
11/29	1,491	4,892	Asphalt

Statistics (2023)
- Total passengers: N/A
- Ranking in Mexico: N/A
- Source: Agencia Federal de Aviación Civil

Ensenada International Airport (Spanish: Aeropuerto Internacional de Ensenada); officially Aeropuerto Internacional Gral. Alberto L. Salinas Carranza (Gral. Alberto L. Salinas Carranza International Airport) (IATA: ESE, ICAO: MMES) is an international airport located in Ensenada, Baja California, Mexico. Designated as Air Force Base No. 3 for the Mexican Air Force, it serves not only as a military facility but also facilitates commuter flights within the Baja California peninsula and supports general aviation activities for Ensenada. Operated by the Mexican Department of Defense, the airport is named after Alberto L. Salinas Carranza, a distinguished Mexican aviator who played a significant role in the Mexican Revolution.

== History ==
In 1942, the airport was established as El Ciprés Military Airfield. In 1955, it officially became an Air Force Base under the administration of President Ruiz Cortines. Throughout its history, the airport has primarily focused on military operations. Passengers traveling within Mexico usually use Tijuana Airport, located 80 kilometres (50 mi) north of Ensenada, while those heading to the United States and other international destinations use San Diego International Airport, located 110 kilometres (68 mi) to the north.

During President Calderón's administration, ambitious plans were made for a new international airport, with an estimated initial investment of $230 million Mexican pesos. However, the construction did not materialize. In 2016, the Baja California State Congress passed a bill for the construction of Ensenada Airport, located in the Municipality of Ojos Negros, east of the city, but the project has not been realized.

Currently, the airport primarily supports military activities, along with air taxi flights and commuter services to destinations within the Baja California peninsula. It also serves as a base for flight training activities conducted by the flight school Instituto Aeronáutico del Noroeste.

== Facilities ==
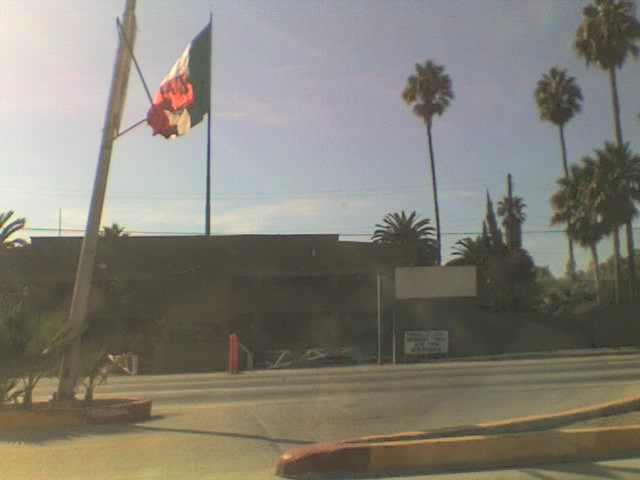
Contiguous military facilities at ESE

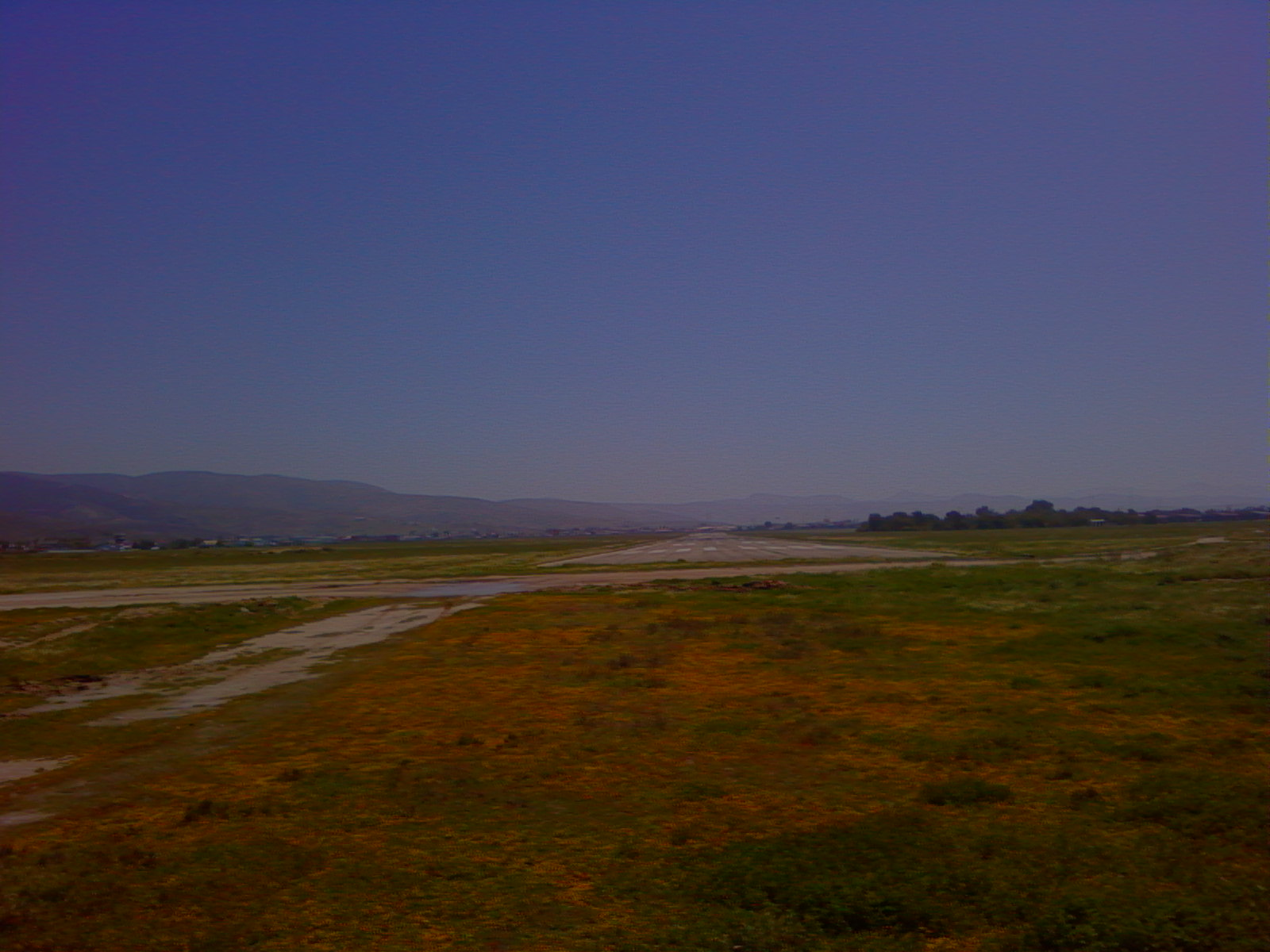
View of the 11 Runway from the beachside

The airport is situated at an elevation of 20 metres (66 ft) above mean sea level, within the Ensenada urban zone, and is accessible through its main entrance on Federal Highway 1, commonly referred to as the Carretera Transpeninsular (Transpeninsular Highway). It features a single asphalt runway, designated as 11/29, measuring 1,491 metres (4,892 ft), and multiple aprons catering to both military aircraft and general aviation.

Air Force Base No. 3 (Spanish: Base Aérea Militar No. 3 El Ciprés) (B.A.M. 3) provides facilities for Mexican Air Force personnel, including housing units, hospitals, pharmacies, schools, and administrative offices. Aviation facilities serve as the home of Squadron 203, which currently operates Beechcraft T-6C+ Texan II aircraft. Adjacent to the apron and hangars, other facilities include a command center for the Federal Aviation Administration, a base command center, a cafeteria, an airport command center, Immigration and Customs services, as well as workshops for aviation mechanics and electronics. The airport operates from 08:00 to 18:00.

== Airlines and destinations ==
=== Passenger ===
Airlines	Destinations
Aéreo Servicio Guerrero	Guerrero Negro, Isla de Cedros

=== Destinations map ===
Destinations from Ensenada International Airport
Red = Year-round destination
Blue = Future destination
Green = Seasonal destination

== See also ==
- List of the busiest airports in Mexico
- List of airports in Mexico
- List of airports by ICAO code: M
- List of busiest airports in North America
- List of the busiest airports in Latin America
- Transportation in Mexico
- Tourism in Mexico
