= Maria Madre Island Naval Air Station =

Isla de María Madre Naval Air Station Aeropuerto Nacional Comodoro P.A. Carlos Castillo Bretón Barrero
- IATA: none; ICAO: MM40; LID: MAR

Summary
- Airport type: Public/Military
- Operator: Grupo Aeroportuario de la Ciudad de México S.A. de C.V
- Serves: Puerto Balleto
- Location: Isla de María Madre
- Commander: Contralmirante C.G. DEM Victor Manuel Fernando Carrasco
- Elevation AMSL: 26 ft (7.9 m)
- Coordinates: 21°39′00″N 106°32′17″W
- Website: https://www.gob.mx/semar/documentos/directorio-de-mandos-navales

Map
- Location of the airport in Nayarit

Runways
Direction	Length		Surface
Direction	ft	m	Surface
01/19	4,593	1,400	Asphalt
- SEMAR; Aeródromos de México

Isla de María Madre Naval Air Station (ICAO: MM40, AFAC: MAR) officially known as Comodoro P.A. Carlos Castillo Bretón Barrero National Airport is a military airport operated by Mexican Navy located in Puerto Balleto in Isla María Madre, Nayarit, Mexico.

It has a night-lit runway heading 01/19, 1,400 meters long and 28 meters wide, as well as a small 4,800-square-meter apron adjacent to the runway. The airport was only used for the transfer of inmates from the former penal colony of the Marías Islands. In October 2024, following the opening of the Islas Marías to the public, the airport was opened to civil aviation, with Aero Servicio Guerrero being the only airline operating seasonal flights from Tepic Airport. The airport was named in honor of the sailor and pilot Carlos Castillo Breton Barrero.

== Airlines and destinations ==
Only one single airline operates seasonal flight from Puerto Balleto.

Airlines	Destinations
Aéreo Servicio Guerrero	Seasonal: Tepic
