= San Blas, Baja California Sur =

Human settlement in Mexico

Coordinates: 23°52′0″N 110°8′47″W

San Blas is a small rural community located in the municipality of La Paz in the Mexican state of Baja California Sur (BCS).

Every year, the community celebrates to hail the return of gray whales to its waters on 24 and 25 February. Another community that celebrates the whales' arrival yearly is Guerrero Negro.
