= Creel Regional Airport =

Creel Regional Airport Aeropuerto Regional Barrancas del Cobre
- IATA: none; ICAO: MMGA; LID: EEL

Summary
- Airport type: Public
- Operator: Administradora de Servicios Aeroportuarios de Chihuahua (ASACH)
- Serves: Creel
- Location: Bocoyna Municipality
- Elevation AMSL: 8,139 ft / 2,481 m
- Coordinates: 27°43′33″N 107°39′16″W
- Website: Aeropuerto Regional Barrancas del Cobre

Map
- Location of the airport in Chihuahua EEL (Mexico)

Runways
Direction	Length		Surface
Direction	ft	m	Surface
10/28	8,268	2,520	Asphalt

Statistics (2025)
- Passengers: 2,128
- Ranking in Mexico: 62nd
- AFAC

Barrancas del Cobre Regional Airport, (ICAO: MMGA, AFAC: EEL) also known as Creel Regional Airport, is an airport located in the municipality of Bocoyna that is operated by Administradora de Servicios Aeroportuarios de Chihuahua. It handled 2,128 passengers in 2025.

== History and facilities ==
The airport was officially inaugurated on January 31, 2024, receiving one private flight from the city of Chihuahua. It had an initial investment of 858 million pesos, of which 57% was federal funds and the remaining 43% was granted by the Administradora de Servicios Aeroportuarios de Chihuahua (ASACH), a joint venture 98% owned by the State of Chihuahua and 2% by the private sector.

It has a 2,520-meter-long and 30-meter-wide lit runway, three 26-meter-wide taxiways, a 16,327.5-square-meter commercial aviation apron with two aircraft positions, and a 10,885-square-meter general aviation apron with nine aircraft positions and VOR-DME radio aids. Its design-critical aircraft is the Embraer 190.

== Airlines and destinations ==
Only one single airline operates flights from Creel.

Airlines	Destinations
Aéreo Servicio Guerrero	Los Mochis
