= Guerrero Negro =

Town in Baja California Sur, Mexico

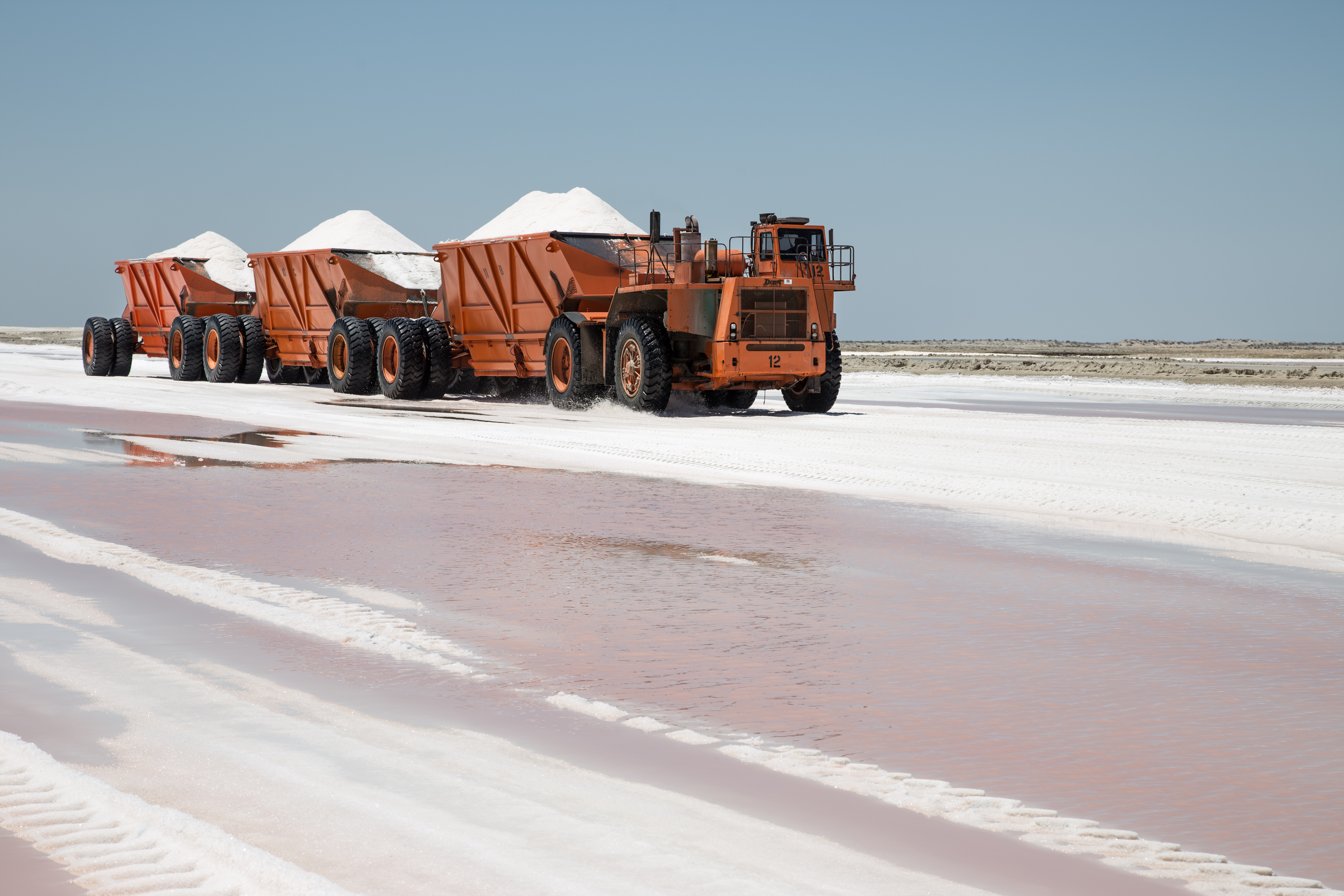
- Salt production in Guerrero Negro.
- Interactive map of Guerrero Negro
- Location in Mexico Guerrero Negro (Baja California Sur)
- Coordinates: 27°57′32″N 114°03′22″W
- Country: Mexico
- State: Baja California Sur
- Municipality: Mulegé
- Elevation: 30 ft (9 m)

Population (2020)
  - Total: 13,596
- Time zone: UTC–07:00 (Zona Pacífico)

Guerrero Negro (English: Black Warrior) is the largest town located in the municipality of Mulegé in the Mexican state of Baja California Sur (BCS). It had a population of 13,596 in the 2020 census. The town is served by Guerrero Negro Airport.

== Community ==
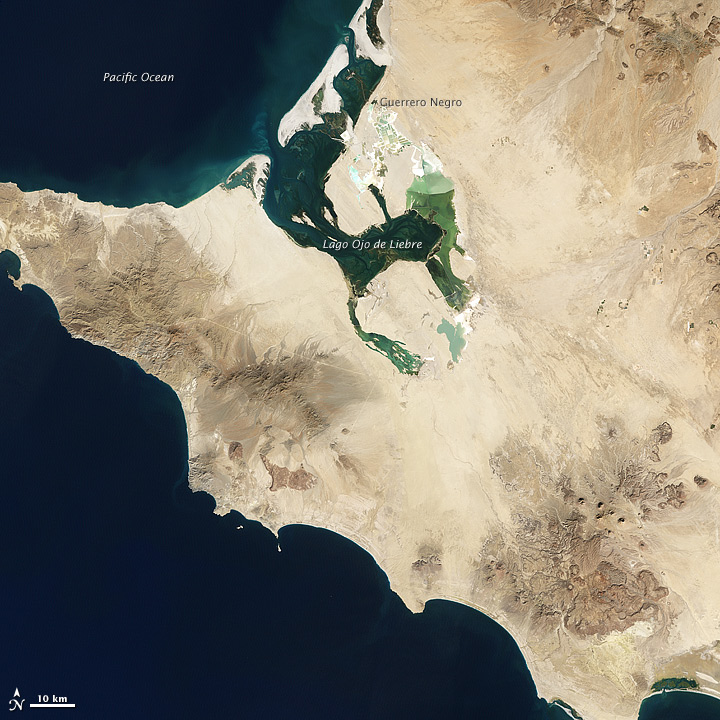
Guerrero Negro is near a lagoon frequented by Grey whales

The town is on Federal Highway 1.

The town has a celebration each year to hail the annual arrival of the gray whales that calve in the lagoons of Baja California Sur (BCS). This festival occurs during the first half of February. The port of San Blas, also in BCS, has a similar festival on February 24 and 25.

== History ==
Guerrero Negro was founded in 1957 when Daniel Ludwig built a salt works there to supply the demand of salt in the western United States. The salt mine was established around the Ojo de Liebre coastal lagoon to take advantage of its strong salinity. This company, called Exportadora de Sal, S.A., of C.V. ("Salt Exporters, Inc."), eventually became the greatest salt mine in the world, with a production of seven million tons of salt per year, exported to the main centers of consumption in the Pacific basin, especially Japan, Korea, the United States, Canada, Taiwan and New Zealand.

Ludwig also constructed the hotel Acapulco Princess in the port of Acapulco, Guerrero. In 1973, he sold the salt company to the Mexican government and the corporation Mitsubishi, 51% and 49% respectively.

The Autonomous University of Baja California Sur opened an extension campus in Guerrero Negro in 1995, offering degrees in economics and agricultural engineering in its first year.

Historical population
Year	Pop.	±%
1995	10,220	—
2000		—
2005		—
2010	13,054	—
2015	14,316	+9.7%
2020	13,596	−5.0%

== Climate ==
Guerrero Negro possesses an ocean-moderated warm desert climate (Köppen: BWh); experiencing quite hot summers and very mild winters. Average maxima vary from 31.3 °C (88.3 °F) in August and September to 23.1 °C (73.6 °F) in January, while average minima fluctuate between 18.8 °C (65.8 °F) in August and 7.4 °C (45.3 °F) in December. Precipitation is very low, averaging 80.1 mm (3.15 in) per annum; and only occurs on 10.1 days annually.

Climate data for Guerrero Negro (27.97°N 114.05°W) (9 m (30 ft) AMSL) (1991-2020)
Month	Jan	Feb	Mar	Apr	May	Jun	Jul	Aug	Sep	Oct	Nov	Dec	Year
Record high °C (°F)	36.5 (97.7)	35.0 (95.0)	36.5 (97.7)	41.5 (106.7)	41.0 (105.8)	40.0 (104.0)	42.0 (107.6)	45.0 (113.0)	43.0 (109.4)	42.5 (108.5)	41.0 (105.8)	36.5 (97.7)	45.0 (113.0)
Mean daily maximum °C (°F)	24.2 (75.6)	24.8 (76.6)	25.4 (77.7)	25.8 (78.4)	26.3 (79.3)	27.5 (81.5)	30.5 (86.9)	32.2 (90.0)	32.2 (90.0)	29.9 (85.8)	26.8 (80.2)	23.5 (74.3)	27.4 (81.4)
Daily mean °C (°F)	16.3 (61.3)	17.3 (63.1)	18.3 (64.9)	19.3 (66.7)	20.2 (68.4)	21.5 (70.7)	24.1 (75.4)	25.7 (78.3)	25.7 (78.3)	23.1 (73.6)	19.3 (66.7)	15.6 (60.1)	20.5 (68.9)
Mean daily minimum °C (°F)	8.4 (47.1)	9.9 (49.8)	11.3 (52.3)	12.9 (55.2)	14.2 (57.6)	15.4 (59.7)	17.6 (63.7)	19.2 (66.6)	19.3 (66.7)	16.2 (61.2)	11.8 (53.2)	7.6 (45.7)	13.7 (56.6)
Record low °C (°F)	−5.0 (23.0)	0.5 (32.9)	1.5 (34.7)	5.5 (41.9)	6.0 (42.8)	10.0 (50.0)	11.0 (51.8)	12.0 (53.6)	12.0 (53.6)	7.0 (44.6)	3.0 (37.4)	0.0 (32.0)	−5.0 (23.0)
Average precipitation mm (inches)	12.5 (0.49)	13.6 (0.54)	7.5 (0.30)	1.7 (0.07)	0.3 (0.01)	0.7 (0.03)	0.3 (0.01)	4.4 (0.17)	9.4 (0.37)	4.8 (0.19)	7.9 (0.31)	20.8 (0.82)	83.9 (3.31)
Average precipitation days (≥ 0.1 mm)	2.4	3.1	1.8	0.7	0.4	0.2	0.6	0.8	1.4	1.2	1.8	3.5	17.9
Source: Servicio Meteorologico Nacional

== Notable residents ==
- Julio César González (1976-2012), professional boxer

== See also ==
- XHGNB-FM
- XHGNS-FM
- El Vizcaíno Biosphere Reserve
