= Exportadora de Sal S.A. =

Mexican salt production company

Exportadora de Sal
- Industry: Salt production
- Founded: April 7, 1954; 72 years ago
- Founder: Daniel K. Ludwig
- Headquarters: Guerrero Negro, Mexico
- Website: www.essa.com.mx

Exportadora de Sal S.A. (abbreviated as ESSA) is a Mexican company dedicated to salt production through solar evaporation of sea water in the Ojo de Liebre Lagoon, Baja California Sur, Mexico. Founded in 1954 by American shipping businessman Daniel K. Ludwig, it is currently partially owned by the Mexican government and Mitsubishi. It is one of the largest sea-salt extraction and processing operations in the world.

== History ==
Rudimentary extraction of the natural salt deposits formed by the flooding and subsequent evaporation of the low parts of the Ojo de Liebre Lagoon (also known as Scammon's Lagoon) had been ongoing for several decades. American shipping magnate Daniel K. Ludwig obtained a concession from the Mexican government, formally starting the company on April 7, 1954. That date is also the official founding date of the town of Guerrero Negro, which was created to house workers for the new company and grew around it. Ludwig bought the interest of British companies who were the first to exploit the saltworks commercially, and by 1963 he had invested US$63 million, reaching an annual salt production output of 5,000,000 metric tons (4,900,000 long tons; 5,500,000 short tons) in the 1970s. The project became the largest salt works facility in the world and included the construction of a deep-water port to ship the salt in Puerto Morro Redondo, Cedros Island. The company diked the shallow tidal flats around Ojo de Liebre lagoon, creating multiple artificial evaporating ponds, eventually covering an area of about 300 square miles (780 km^{2}).

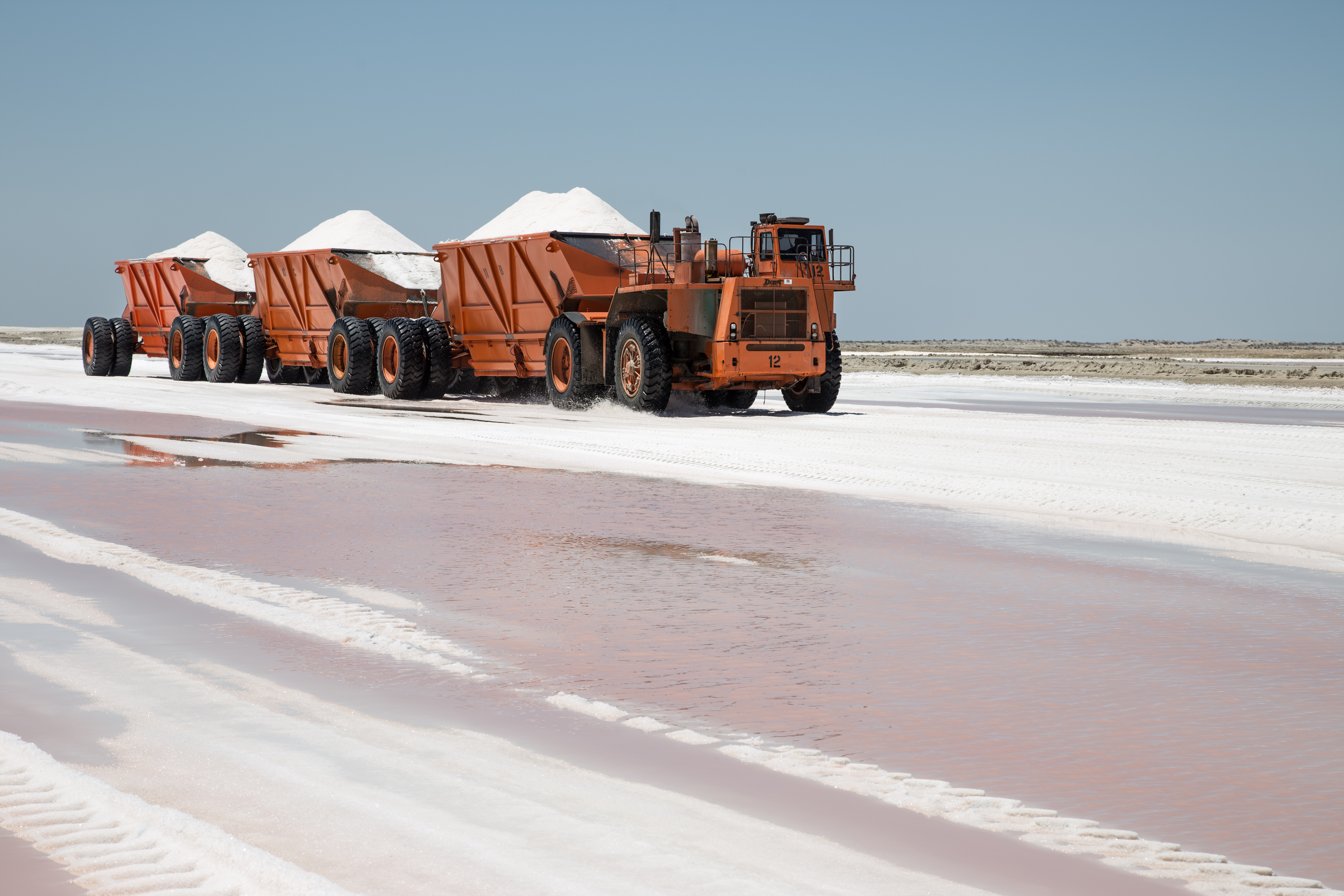
Salt transporters in Guerrero Negro

In the 1960s Japanese corporation Mitsubishi became the main customer of ESSA and purchased the entire company in 1973 for US$18 million, taking over operations. It is possible that Ludwig's decision to sell was motivated by rumors of a potential expropriation of the company by the centralist government of President Luis Echeverría (1970–1976). In 1976 a new mining law forced Mitsubishi to sell 26% of its stock to the Mexican government, after it had previously sold 25%. Since then ESSA has been jointly owned by the Mexican government (51%) and Mitsubishi (49%), with the company holding exclusive rights to sell the salt. As of 2014 Exportadora de Sal S.A. was referred as the largest salt works, salt producer and exporter in the world, with a yearly output of 8 million tons, constituting around half of Japan's salt imports. Salt exported by ESSA is mainly used in the chemical industry for the production of caustic soda, chlorine and sodium carbonate.

After Gregorio Cavazos Rodríguez quit as ESSA's general director in March 2022, serving in the role for a year, Raúl Franco Morones was named director.

In February 2024 the Mexican government under president López Obrador paid 1,500 million pesos to buy the remaining 49% percent ownership from Mitsubishi. One analysis questioned the economic and commercial benefits to Mexico and characterized the transaction as political and media maneuvering. Even though Mitsubishi initially announced that it would continue to buy salt from ESSA, local media reported later on July that the Japanese corporation was not satisfied with the negotiation and stopped the salt purchases. Due to a reduction in sales more than 5 million tons of salt accumulated in the ports of Chaparrito and Morro Redondo by November 2024, a situation which caused uncertainty, economic hardship and tensions with the salt workers union due to the possibility of layoffs. Further difficulties were caused by machinery malfunction due to obsolescence and lack of maintenance.

== Operations ==
Sea water is pumped into the collection ponds for initial evaporation, with the brine solution moved afterwards to crystallization ponds to finish drying up. The resulting mineral salt is transported in large dumping trucks to Chaparrito Port near Guerrero Negro to be cleaned and loaded into barges. These barges can carry up to 10,500 metric tons (10,300 long tons; 11,600 short tons) of salt to Morro Redondo, where it is inspected, stored and finally exported in ocean-going vessels.

== Corruption controversies ==
Jorge Humberto López Portillo, general director of ESSA from July 2013 to December 2014, was prosecuted for irregularities such as purchasing a new barge for US$27.2 million and signing 30-year contracts with Packsys for residual brine treatment, both actions taken without administrative committee authorization. Packsys sued for breach of contract, but ESSA, represented by law firm O'Melveny, got the case dismissed. López Portillo was banned from civil service for ten years although he contested this and claimed innocence and political persecution. Fellow Institutional Revolutionary Party member Abel Salgado Peña formally requested that López Portillo be expelled from the party due to the accusations of corruption.

In January 2019 Nonato Antonio Avilés Rocha was named by President Andres Manuel López Obrador as ESSA's general director. Avilés Rocha quit in January 2021, after it was found that he gave contracts to companies owned by his cousins and nephews, increased executive salaries above approved limits, signed off unjustified expenses and paid for services that were not provided. Irregular salt sales were also detected.

== Environmental impact ==
In 1994, seeking to increase its production output, ESSA proposed an expansion of its facilities into the nearby San Ignacio Lagoon which is part of El Vizcaíno Biosphere Reserve, a whale and migratory bird sanctuary. After Serge Dedina, founder of Wildcoast, exposed these plans, an opposition campaign was carried out by prominent intellectuals, artists, and several NGOs such as the Natural Resources Defense Council in the United States and the Group of 100 in Mexico. Poet and activist Homero Aridjis, leader of the Group of 100, denounced the potential impact of the project, such as salinity reduction due to the extraction of 462 million metric tons of water from the lagoon, affecting plant and animal life. The opposition effort was successful, culminating with Mexican President Ernesto Zedillo announcing in March 2000 the abandonment of the project.

In 1998 CorpWatch accused Mitsubishi of greenwashing due to "their ongoing public relations initiative to convince the world that it is environmentally benign, as well as socially and economically desirable to establish the largest industrial salt evaporation facility in the world in a lagoon that is the last pristine calving ground of the California gray whale". In 1999 conservation groups including Greenpeace Mexico submitted a formal accusation to the Mexican government against ESSA for environmental law violations. The increased death of green sea turtles (Chelonia mydas) at Ojo de Liebre lagoon has been potentially linked to the dumping of bitterns by ESSA.

A dispute concerning the disposal of the residual brine solution arose between ESSA, local people and environmental activists. Following exhortations from the Mexican Congress, in 2019 the company invested 200 million pesos in a new pumping system to dispose of the residual brine.
