= List of the busiest airports in North America =

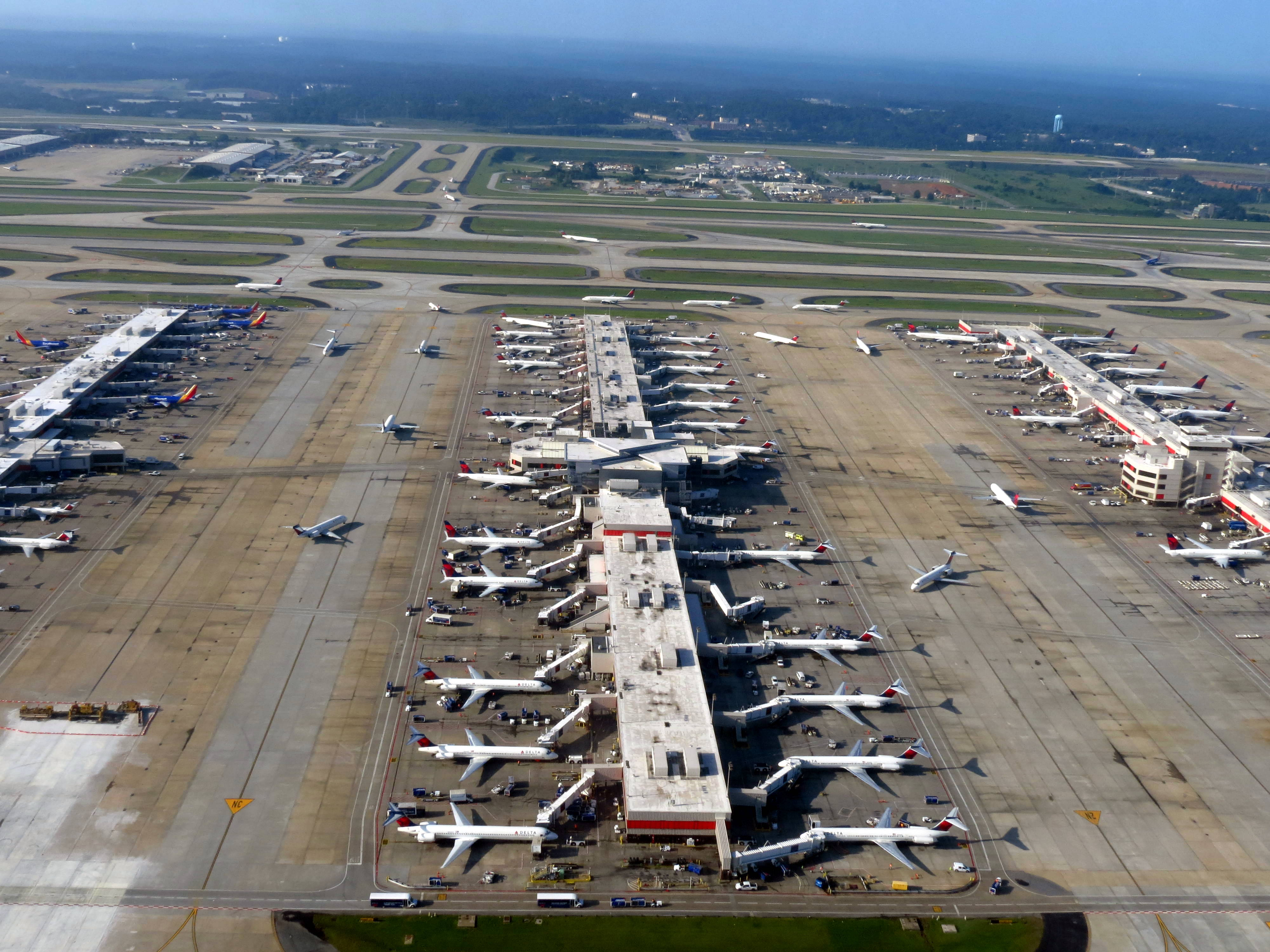
Hartsfield–Jackson Atlanta International Airport in Atlanta, the busiest airport in North America since 1998 and busiest airport in the world since 2022

This is a list of the 50 busiest airports in North America. List is ranked by total passengers per year. Data is sourced from annual reports provided by Airports Council International. Tables also show the percentage change in total passengers for each airport as well as change in ranking in comparison to the previous year. Historic rankings dating back to 2013 are also presented.

== 2025 ==
2025 North American Top airports
Rank	Rank change 24–25	Airport	City served	Country	Passengers	Annual change
1	Steady	Hartsfield–Jackson Atlanta International Airport	Atlanta	United States	106,302,208	▼1.6%
2	Steady	Dallas Fort Worth International Airport	Dallas–Fort Worth	United States	85,660,127	▼2.5%
3	▲1	O'Hare International Airport	Chicago	United States	84,856,018	▲6.0%
4	▼1	Denver International Airport	Denver	United States	82,427,962	▲0.1%
5	Steady	Los Angeles International Airport	Los Angeles	United States	73,709,594	▼3.8%
6	Steady	John F. Kennedy International Airport	New York City	United States	62,629,455	▼1.0%
7	▲2	Orlando International Airport	Orlando	United States	57,675,573	▲0.8%
8	▲2	Miami International Airport	Miami	United States	55,314,661	▼1.1%
9	▼1	Harry Reid International Airport	Las Vegas	United States	55,030,375	▼5.9%
10	▲3	San Francisco International Airport	San Francisco	United States	54,532,613	▲4.3%
11	▼4	Charlotte Douglas International Airport	Charlotte	United States	53,574,392	▼8.9%
12	▼1	Seattle–Tacoma International Airport	Seattle-Tacoma	United States	52,715,181	▲0.1%
13	▼1	Phoenix Sky Harbor International Airport	Phoenix	United States	51,618,649	▼1.4%
14	▲1	George Bush Intercontinental Airport	Houston	United States	48,131,213	▼0.7%
15	▲1	Toronto Pearson International Airport	Toronto	Canada	47,249,215	▲1.0%
16	▼2	Newark Liberty International Airport	Newark	United States	47,000,085	▼4.1%
17	Steady	Mexico City International Airport	Mexico City	Mexico	44,605,576	▼1.7%
18	Steady	Logan International Airport	Boston	United States	43,287,590	▼0.6%
19	Steady	Minneapolis–Saint Paul International Airport	Minneapolis-Saint Paul	United States	36,071,627	▼3.0%
20	▲2	Detroit Metropolitan Airport	Detroit	United States	33,372,682	▲1.2%
21	Steady	LaGuardia Airport	New York City	United States	32,791,050	▼2.2%
22	▼2	Fort Lauderdale-Hollywood International Airport	Fort Lauderdale	United States	32,208,419	▼8.2%
23	Steady	Philadelphia International Airport	Philadelphia	United States	30,136,790	▼2.5%
24	Steady	Cancún International Airport	Cancún	Mexico	29,345,538	▼3.5%
25	▲2	Dulles International Airport	Washington	United States	28,653,712	▲6.2%
26	▼1	Salt Lake City International Airport	Salt Lake City	United States	28,158,007	▼0.7%
27	▲2	Vancouver International Airport	Vancouver	Canada	26,913,561	▲2.7%
28	▲4	Nashville International Airport	Nashville	United States	25,715,851	▲4.6%
29	▲1	San Diego International Airport	San Diego	United States	25,320,556	▲0.3%
30	▼4	Baltimore/Washington International Airport	Baltimore-Washington	United States	25,215,520	▼6.8%
31	▼3	Ronald Reagan Washington National Airport	Washington	United States	24,852,700	▼5.4%
32	▼1	Tampa International Airport	Tampa	United States	24,811,253	▲0.2%
33	Steady	Montréal-Trudeau International Airport	Montréal	Canada	22,364,685	▼0.5%
34	Steady	Daniel K. Inouye International Airport	Honolulu	United States	22,115,182	▲0.5%
35	Steady	Austin–Bergstrom International Airport	Austin	United States	21,666,852	▼0.4%
36	▲1	Calgary International Airport	Calgary	Canada	19,409,550	▲2.7%
37	▼1	Midway International Airport	Chicago	United States	19,379,940	▼9.9%
38	▲1	Guadalajara International Airport	Guadalajara	Mexico	18,773,673	▲5.1%
39	▲1	Portland International Airport	Portland	United States	18,563,132	▲6.0%
40	▼2	Dallas Love Field	Dallas	United States	16,824,528	▼5.9%
41	▲1	Raleigh–Durham International Airport	Raleigh, Durham	United States	15,649,136	▲1.1%
42	▲3	Monterrey International Airport	Monterrey	Mexico	15,623,275	▲15.0%
43	▼2	St. Louis Lambert International Airport	St. Louis	United States	15,303,756	▼4.0%
44	▼1	William P. Hobby Airport	Houston	United States	13,943,759	▼4.6%
45	▲1	Sacramento International Airport	Sacramento	United States	13,914,512	▲2.0%
46	Steady	Luis Muñoz Marín International Airport	San Juan	Puerto Rico (U.S.)	13,643,686	▲3.0%
47	▲1	Tijuana International Airport	Tijuana	Mexico	12,765,761	▲1.5%
48	▼1	Louis Armstrong New Orleans International Airport	New Orleans	United States	12,429,729	▼5.2%
49	Steady	Kansas City International Airport	Kansas City	United States	11,459,954	▼5.5%
50	New entry	John Wayne Airport	Santa Ana/Orange County, CA	United States	11,369,191	▲2.5%

== 2024 ==
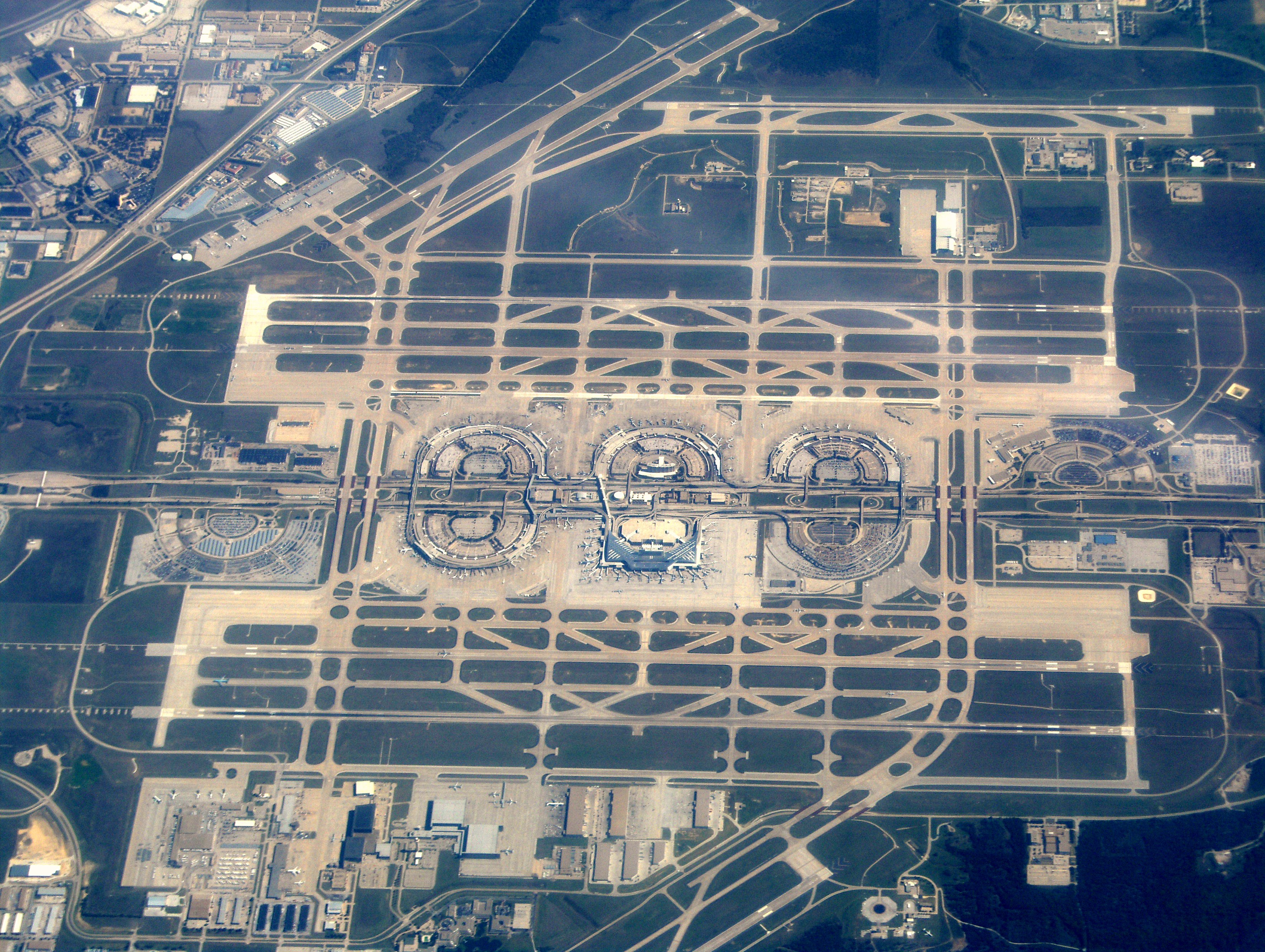
Dallas Fort Worth International Airport, the second-busiest airport in North America with 87,817,864 passengers in 2024

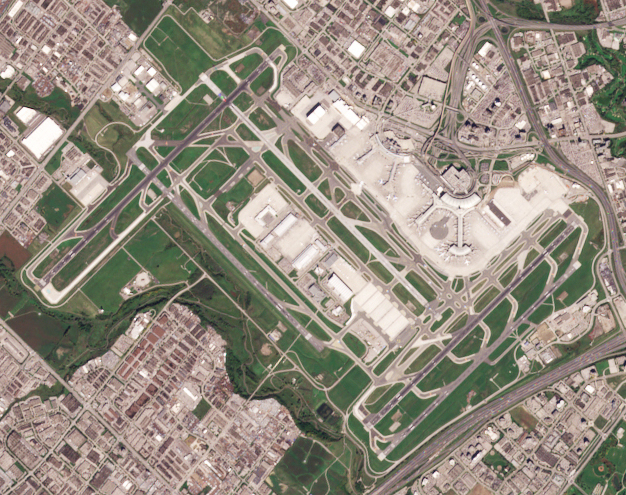
Toronto Pearson International Airport, the busiest airport in North America outside the United States after Mexico City International Airport held the rank for four years in a row

2024 North American Top airports
Rank	Rank change 23–24	Airport	City served	Country	Passengers	Annual change
1	Steady	Hartsfield–Jackson Atlanta International Airport	Atlanta	United States	108,067,766	▲3.3%
2	Steady	Dallas Fort Worth International Airport	Dallas–Fort Worth	United States	87,817,864	▲7.4%
3	Steady	Denver International Airport	Denver	United States	82,358,744	▲5.8%
4	▲1	O'Hare International Airport	Chicago	United States	80,043,050	▲8.3%
5	▼1	Los Angeles International Airport	Los Angeles	United States	76,588,028	▲2.0%
6	Steady	John F. Kennedy International Airport	New York City	United States	63,265,984	▲1.9%
7	▲2	Charlotte Douglas International Airport	Charlotte	United States	58,811,725	▲10.0%
8	Steady	Harry Reid International Airport	Las Vegas	United States	58,482,005	▲1.4%
9	▼2	Orlando International Airport	Orlando	United States	57,211,628	▼0.9%
10	Steady	Miami International Airport	Miami	United States	55,926,566	▲6.9%
11	Steady	Seattle–Tacoma International Airport	Seattle-Tacoma	United States	52,640,716	▲3.2%
12	▲2	Phoenix Sky Harbor International Airport	Phoenix	United States	52,325,266	▲7.5%
13	▼1	San Francisco International Airport	San Francisco	United States	52,269,844	▲4.1%
14	Steady	Newark Liberty International Airport	Newark	United States	48,853,370	▼0.5%
15	▲1	George Bush Intercontinental Airport	Houston	United States	48,448,545	▲4.9%
16	▲1	Toronto Pearson International Airport	Toronto	Canada	46,590,115	▲4.1%
17	▼2	Mexico City International Airport	Mexico City	Mexico	45,359,485	▼6.3%
18	Steady	Logan International Airport	Boston	United States	43,555,230	▲6.6%
19	▲1	Minneapolis–Saint Paul International Airport	Minneapolis-Saint Paul	United States	37,168,257	▲6.9%
20	▼1	Fort Lauderdale-Hollywood International Airport	Fort Lauderdale	United States	35,208,611	▲0.3%
21	▲1	LaGuardia Airport	New York City	United States	33,543,943	▲3.6%
22	▲1	Detroit Metropolitan Airport	Detroit	United States	32,971,575	▲4.8%
23	▲1	Philadelphia International Airport	Philadelphia	United States	30,896,572	▲9.8%
24	▼3	Cancún International Airport	Cancún	Mexico	30,411,520	▼7.1%
25	Steady	Salt Lake City International Airport	Salt Lake City	United States	28,364,610	▲5.2%
26	Steady	Baltimore/Washington International Airport	Baltimore-Washington	United States	27,059,733	▲3.3%
27	▲2	Dulles International Airport	Washington	United States	26,969,128	▲8.3%
28	▼1	Ronald Reagan Washington National Airport	Washington	United States	26,259,434	▲3.3%
29	▼1	Vancouver International Airport	Vancouver	Canada	26,205,801	▲5.1%
30	Steady	San Diego International Airport	San Diego	United States	25,241,919	▲4.9%
31	Steady	Tampa International Airport	Tampa	United States	24,757,787	▲3.4%
32	Steady	Nashville International Airport	Nashville	United States	24,593,324	▲7.5%
33	▲3	Montréal-Trudeau International Airport	Montréal	Canada	22,400,099	▲5.8%
34	▲1	Daniel K. Inouye International Airport	Honolulu	United States	21,999,397	▲3.0%
35	▼2	Austin–Bergstrom International Airport	Austin	United States	21,762,904	▼1.5%
36	▼2	Midway International Airport	Chicago	United States	21,513,521	▼2.4%
37	Steady	Calgary International Airport	Calgary	Canada	18,896,084	▲2.2%
38	▲2	Dallas Love Field	Dallas	United States	17,882,906	▲1.7%
39	Steady	Guadalajara International Airport	Guadalajara	Mexico	17,848,700	▲0.8%
40	▼2	Portland International Airport	Portland	United States	17,518,499	▲6.3%
41	Steady	St. Louis Lambert International Airport	St. Louis	United States	15,946,730	▲7.1%
42	Steady	Raleigh–Durham International Airport	Raleigh, Durham	United States	15,475,466	▲6.6%
43	Steady	William P. Hobby Airport	Houston	United States	14,612,605	▲5.1%
44	▲2	Sacramento International Airport	Sacramento	United States	13,635,818	▲5.1%
45	▼1	Monterrey International Airport	Monterrey	Mexico	13,581,599	▲0.6%
46	▲2	Luis Muñoz Marín International Airport	San Juan	Puerto Rico (U.S.)	13,247,382	▲8.6%
47	Steady	Louis Armstrong New Orleans International Airport	New Orleans	United States	13,201,419	▲3.6%
48	▼3	Tijuana International Airport	Tijuana	Mexico	12,545,800	▼4.9%
49	New entry	Kansas City International Airport	Kansas City	United States	12,121,778	▲5.0%
50	▼1	San Jose International Airport	San Jose	United States	11,212,646	▼1.5%

== 2023 ==
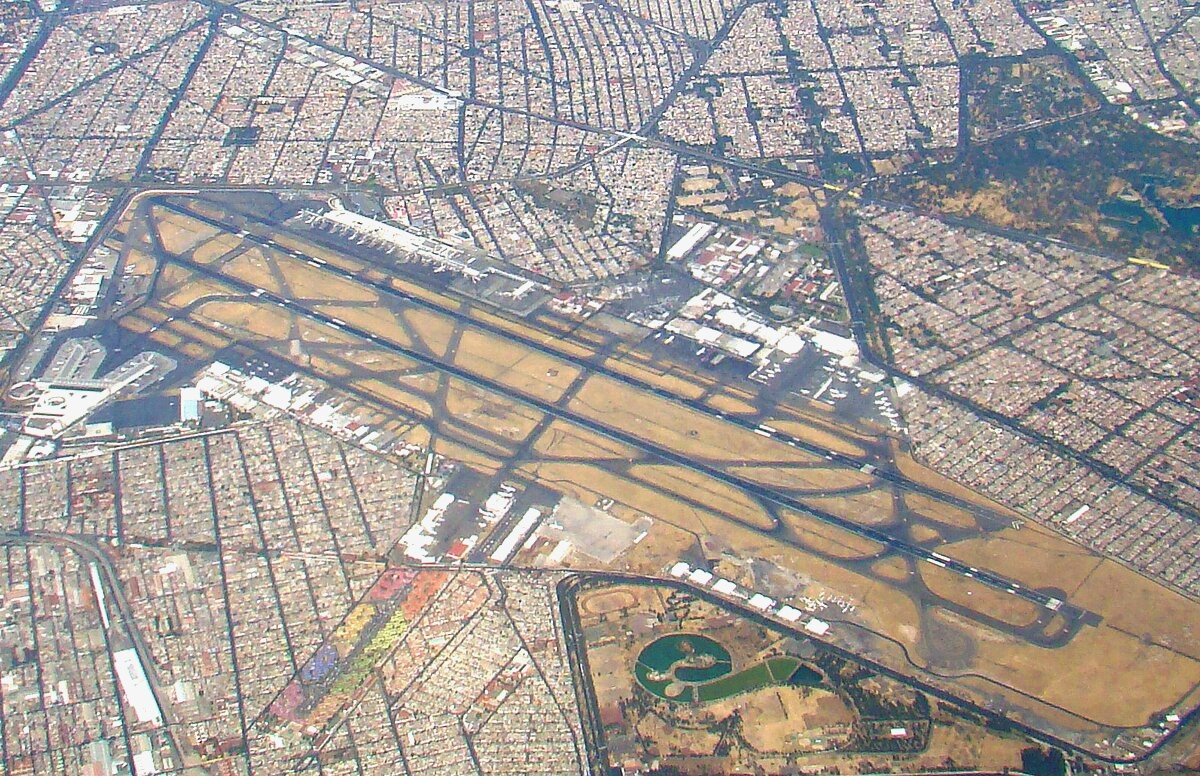
Mexico City International Airport, the busiest airport in North America outside the United States for the fourth year in a row

2023 North American Top airports
Rank	Rank change 22–23	Airport	City served	Country	Passengers	Annual change
1	Steady	Hartsfield–Jackson Atlanta International Airport	Atlanta	United States	104,653,451	▲11.7%
2	Steady	Dallas Fort Worth International Airport	Dallas–Fort Worth	United States	81,755,538	▲11.4%
3	Steady	Denver International Airport	Denver	United States	77,837,917	▲12.3%
4	▲1	Los Angeles International Airport	Los Angeles	United States	75,050,875	▲13.8%
5	▼1	O'Hare International Airport	Chicago	United States	73,894,226	▲8.1%
6	Steady	John F. Kennedy International Airport	New York City	United States	62,464,331	▲13.0%
7	▲2	Orlando International Airport	Orlando	United States	57,735,726	▲15.1%
8	▼1	Harry Reid International Airport	Las Vegas	United States	57,666,456	▲9.4%
9	▲1	Charlotte Douglas International Airport	Charlotte	United States	53,445,770	▲11.9%
10	▼2	Miami International Airport	Miami	United States	52,340,934	▲3.3%
11	▲1	Seattle–Tacoma International Airport	Seattle-Tacoma	United States	50,877,260	▲10.7%
12	▲3	San Francisco International Airport	San Francisco	United States	50,196,094	▲18.7%
13	▲1	Newark Liberty International Airport	Newark	United States	49,084,774	▲12.7%
14	▼1	Phoenix Sky Harbor International Airport	Phoenix	United States	48,654,432	▲9.6%
15	▼4	Mexico City International Airport	Mexico City	Mexico	48,415,693	▲4.8%
16	Steady	George Bush Intercontinental Airport	Houston	United States	46,192,499	▲12.7%
17	▲1	Toronto Pearson International Airport	Toronto	Canada	44,761,805	▲25.6%
18	▼1	Logan International Airport	Boston	United States	40,861,658	▲13.2%
19	Steady	Fort Lauderdale-Hollywood International Airport	Fort Lauderdale	United States	35,115,485	▲10.8%
20	Steady	Minneapolis–Saint Paul International Airport	Minneapolis-Saint Paul	United States	34,770,800	▲11.2%
21	Steady	Cancún International Airport	Cancún	Mexico	32,750,413	▲7.9%
22	Steady	LaGuardia Airport	New York City	United States	32,384,960	▲11.7%
23	Steady	Detroit Metropolitan Airport	Detroit	United States	31,453,486	▲11.7%
24	▲1	Philadelphia International Airport	Philadelphia	United States	28,131,972	▲12.6%
25	▼1	Salt Lake City International Airport	Salt Lake City	United States	26,952,754	▲4.7%
26	▲1	Baltimore/Washington International Airport	Baltimore-Washington	United States	26,200,143	▲14.9%
27	▼1	Ronald Reagan Washington National Airport	Washington	United States	25,425,394	▲6.2%
28	▲6	Vancouver International Airport	Vancouver	Canada	24,938,184	▲31.2%
29	▲1	Dulles International Airport	Washington	United States	24,894,553	▲17.3%
30	▼2	San Diego International Airport	San Diego	United States	24,061,607	▲9.3%
31	▼2	Tampa International Airport	Tampa	United States	23,947,891	▲11.2%
32	Steady	Nashville International Airport	Nashville	United States	22,877,671	▲5.7%
33	▼2	Austin–Bergstrom International Airport	Austin	United States	22,095,876	▲4.8%
34	▼1	Midway International Airport	Chicago	United States	22,050,489	▲10.7%
35	Steady	Daniel K. Inouye International Airport	Honolulu	United States	21,363,932	▲15.7%
36	Steady	Montréal-Trudeau International Airport	Montréal	Canada	21,173,941	▲32.5%
37	▲3	Calgary International Airport	Calgary	Canada	18,493,523	▲28.0%
38	▲1	Portland International Airport	Portland	United States	17,824,178	▲20.3%
39	▼1	Guadalajara International Airport	Guadalajara	Mexico	17,678,839	▲13.51%
40	▼3	Dallas Love Field	Dallas	United States	17,575,466	▲10.1%
41	Steady	St. Louis Lambert International Airport	St. Louis	United States	14,886,000	▲8.9%
42	▲4	Raleigh–Durham International Airport	Raleigh, Durham	United States	14,523,996	▲22.6%
43	▼1	William P. Hobby Airport	Houston	United States	13,908,466	▲6.1%
44	▲6	Monterrey International Airport	Monterrey	Mexico	13,326,936	▲21.8%
45	▼1	Tijuana International Airport	Tijuana	Mexico	13,180,604	▲7.1%
46	▼3	Sacramento International Airport	Sacramento	United States	12,977,001	▲5.4%
47	▼2	Louis Armstrong New Orleans International Airport	New Orleans	United States	12,738,847	▲7.1%
48	New entry	Luis Muñoz Marín International Airport	San Juan	Puerto Rico (U.S.)	12,197,553	▲18.3%
49	Steady	San Jose International Airport	San Jose	United States	12,097,160	▲6.7%
50	▼2	John Wayne Airport	Santa Ana/Orange County, California	United States	11,741,325	▲3.3%

== 2022 ==
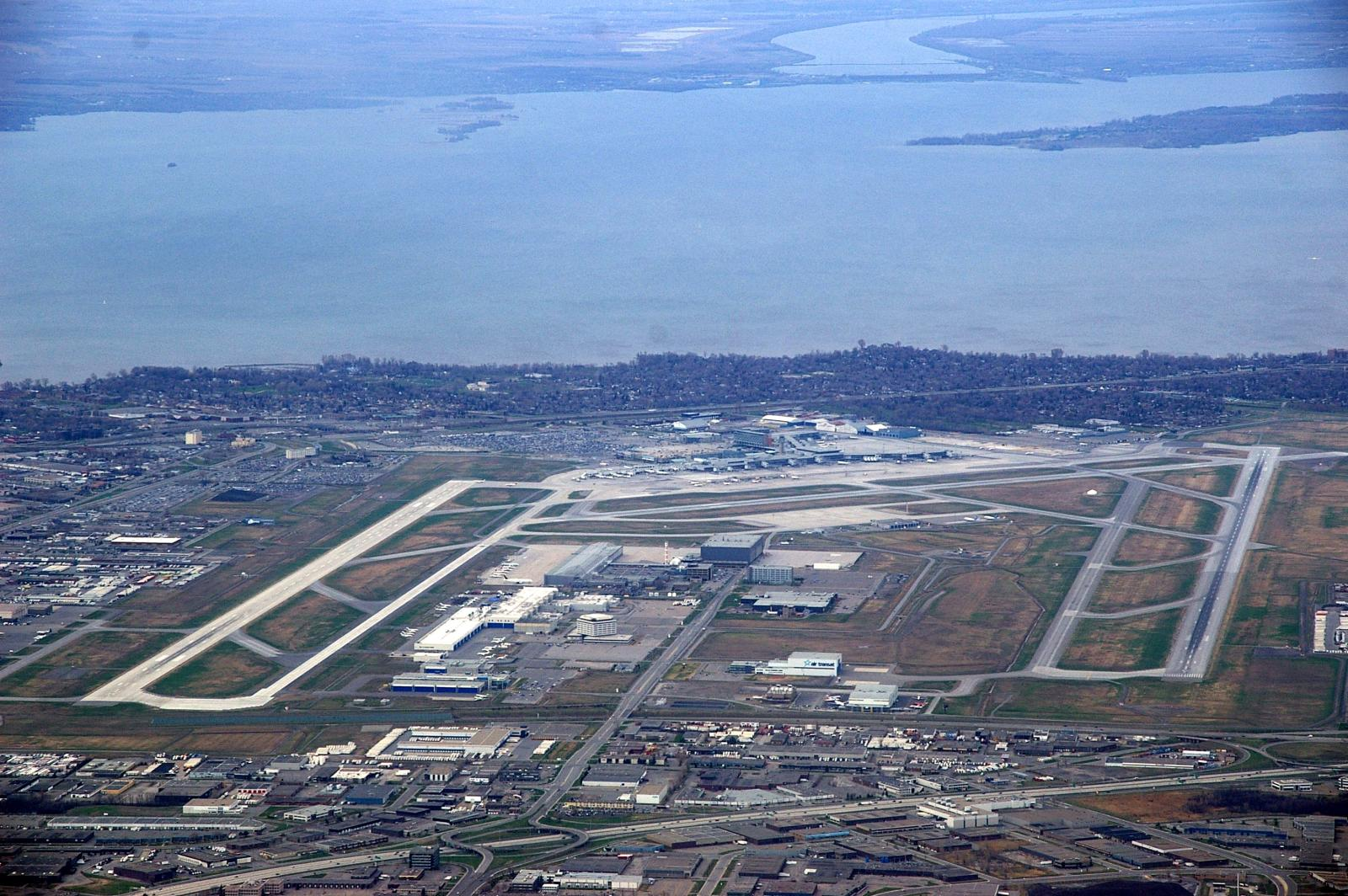
In 2022, Montréal-Trudeau International Airport saw the largest recovery in passenger traffic with a 207.1 percent increase in passengers over 2021.

2022 North American Top airports
Rank	Rank change 21–22	Airport	City served	Country	Passengers	Annual change
1	Steady	Hartsfield–Jackson Atlanta International Airport	Atlanta	United States	93,699,630	▲23.8%
2	Steady	Dallas Fort Worth International Airport	Dallas–Fort Worth	United States	73,362,946	▲17.4%
3	Steady	Denver International Airport	Denver	United States	69,286,461	▲17.8%
4	Steady	O'Hare International Airport	Chicago	United States	68,340,619	▲26.5%
5	Steady	Los Angeles International Airport	Los Angeles	United States	65,924,298	▲37.3%
6	▲8	John F. Kennedy International Airport	New York City	United States	55,175,249	▲79.2%
7	▲1	Harry Reid International Airport	Las Vegas	United States	52,667,741	▲32.6%
8	▲2	Miami International Airport	Miami	United States	50,684,396	▲35.9%
9	▼2	Orlando International Airport	Orlando	United States	50,178,499	▲24.4%
10	▼4	Charlotte Douglas International Airport	Charlotte	United States	47,758,605	▲10.3%
11	▲1	Mexico City International Airport	Mexico City	Mexico	46,200,529	▲28.23%
12	▼1	Seattle–Tacoma International Airport	Seattle-Tacoma	United States	45,964,321	▲27.1%
13	▼4	Phoenix Sky Harbor International Airport	Phoenix	United States	44,397,854	▲14.3%
14	▲1	Newark Liberty International Airport	Newark	United States	43,402,059	▲49.4%
15	▲3	San Francisco International Airport	San Francisco	United States	42,281,641	▲73.7%
16	▼3	George Bush Intercontinental Airport	Houston	United States	40,977,839	▲21.7%
17	▲3	Logan International Airport	Boston	United States	36,090,176	▲59.1%
18	▲16	Toronto Pearson International Airport	Toronto	Canada	35,600,000	▲180.8%
19	▼3	Fort Lauderdale-Hollywood International Airport	Fort Lauderdale	United States	31,686,404	▲12.9%
20	▼3	Minneapolis–Saint Paul International Airport	Minneapolis-Saint Paul	United States	31,241,822	▲24.0%
21	▲1	Cancún International Airport	Cancún	Mexico	30,342,961	▲35.95%
22	▲6	LaGuardia Airport	New York City	United States	29,040,963	▲87%
23	▼4	Detroit Metropolitan Airport	Detroit	United States	28,160,572	▲19.3%
24	▼3	Salt Lake City International Airport	Salt Lake City	United States	25,752,783	▲15.1%
25	▼2	Philadelphia International Airport	Philadelphia	United States	25,242,133	▲28.5%
26	▲5	Ronald Reagan Washington National Airport	Washington	United States	23,961,442	▲70.6%
27	▼3	Baltimore/Washington International Airport	Baltimore-Washington	United States	22,804,744	▲20.9%
28	▼1	San Diego International Airport	San Diego	United States	22,009,921	▲41.1%
29	▼4	Tampa International Airport	Tampa	United States	21,527,863	▲18.8%
30	Steady	Dulles International Airport	Washington	United States	21,376,896	▲42.4%
31	▲1	Austin–Bergstrom International Airport	Austin	United States	21,089,289	▲55.4%
32	▼3	Nashville International Airport	Nashville	United States	20,045,685	▲29.2%
33	▼7	Midway International Airport	Chicago	United States	19,916,643	▲25.3%
34	New entry	Vancouver International Airport	Vancouver	Canada	19,013,416	▲168.3%
35	▲1	Daniel K. Inouye International Airport	Honolulu	United States	18,346,044	▲52.1%
36	New entry	Montréal-Trudeau International Airport	Montréal	Canada	15,973,242	▲207.1%
37	▼4	Dallas Love Field	Dallas	United States	15,685,850	▲17.8%
38	▼3	Guadalajara International Airport	Guadalajara	Mexico	15,574,002	▲27.56%
39	▼2	Portland International Airport	Portland	United States	14,818,654	▲25.5%
40	New entry	Calgary International Airport	Calgary	Canada	14,452,059	▲128.4%
41	▼2	St. Louis Lambert International Airport	St. Louis	United States	13,665,517	▲32.0%
42	▼4	William P. Hobby Airport	Houston	United States	13,113,866	▲15.9%
43	▼2	Sacramento International Airport	Sacramento	United States	12,313,370	▲26.9%
44	▼2	Tijuana International Airport	Tijuana	Mexico	12,308,370	▲27.34%
45	▲1	Louis Armstrong New Orleans International Airport	New Orleans	United States	11,895,985	▲47.5%
46	▼3	Raleigh–Durham International Airport	Raleigh, Durham	United States	11,842,330	▲34.6%
47	Steady	John Wayne Airport	Santa Ana/Orange County, California	United States	11,360,839	▲47.5%
48	New entry	San Jose International Airport	San Jose	United States	11,333,723	▲54.0%
49	▼4	Oakland International Airport	Oakland	United States	11,146,229	▲36.9%
50	▼6	Monterrey International Airport	Monterrey	Mexico	10,943,186	▲32.33%

== 2021 ==
2021 North American Top airports
Rank	Rank change 20–21	Airport	City served	Country	Passengers	Annual change
1	Steady	Hartsfield–Jackson Atlanta International Airport	Atlanta	United States	75,704,760	▲76.4%
2	Steady	Dallas/Fort Worth International Airport	Dallas–Fort Worth	United States	62,465,756	▲58.7%
3	Steady	Denver International Airport	Denver	United States	58,828,552	▲74.4%
4	Steady	O'Hare International Airport	Chicago	United States	54,020,399	▲75.0%
5	Steady	Los Angeles International Airport	Los Angeles	United States	48,007,284	▲66.8%
6	Steady	Charlotte Douglas International Airport	Charlotte	United States	43,302,230	▲59.2%
7	▲3	Orlando International Airport	Orlando	United States	40,351,068	▲86.7%
8	▼1	Harry Reid International Airport	Las Vegas	United States	39,710,493	▲78.9%
9	Steady	Phoenix Sky Harbor International Airport	Phoenix	United States	38,846,713	▲76.7%
10	▲2	Miami International Airport	Miami	United States	37,302,456	▲99.9%
11	Steady	Seattle–Tacoma International Airport	Seattle-Tacoma	United States	36,154,015	▲80.2%
12	▼4	Mexico City International Airport	Mexico City	Mexico	36,028,389	▲63.93%
13	Steady	George Bush Intercontinental Airport	Houston	United States	33,677,118	▲84.9%
14	Steady	John F. Kennedy International Airport	New York City	United States	30,788,322	▲85.1%
15	▲2	Newark Liberty International Airport	Newark	United States	29,049,552	▲82.8%
16	▼1	Fort Lauderdale-Hollywood International Airport	Fort Lauderdale	United States	28,076,808	▲70.3%
17	▲1	Minneapolis–Saint Paul International Airport	Minneapolis-Saint Paul	United States	25,202,120	▲69.7%
18	▼2	San Francisco International Airport	San Francisco	United States	24,343,627	▲48.3%
19	Steady	Detroit Metropolitan Airport	Detroit	United States	23,610,765	▲67.4%
20	▲1	Logan International Airport	Boston	United States	22,678,499	▲79.7%
21	▲1	Salt Lake City International Airport	Salt Lake City	United States	22,383,878	▲78.2%
22	▲1	Cancún International Airport	Cancún	Mexico	22,318,467	▲82.06%
23	▲1	Philadelphia International Airport	Philadelphia	United States	19,638,387	▲65.5%
24	▲1	Baltimore/Washington International Airport	Baltimore-Washington	United States	18,868,429	▲68.4%
25	▲1	Tampa International Airport	Tampa	United States	18,115,213	▲76.9%
26	▲2	Midway International Airport	Chicago	United States	15,893,595	▲79.5%
27	Steady	San Diego International Airport	San Diego	United States	15,602,505	▲73.5%
28	▲2	LaGuardia Airport	New York City	United States	15,526,712	▲88.3%
29	Steady	Nashville International Airport	Nashville	United States	15,516,601	▲87.3%
30	▲1	Dulles International Airport	Washington	United States	15,006,955	▲80.1%
31	▲3	Ronald Reagan Washington National Airport	Washington	United States	14,044,724	▲85.4%
32	▲7	Austin–Bergstrom International Airport	Austin	United States	13,570,711	▲109.7%
33	Steady	Dallas Love Field	Dallas	United States	13,315,498	▲73.3%
34	▼14	Toronto Pearson International Airport	Toronto	Canada	12,700,000	▼4.5%
35	▼3	Guadalajara International Airport	Guadalajara	Mexico	12,208,828	▲50.84%
36	▲1	Daniel K. Inouye International Airport	Honolulu	United States	12,064,992	▲81.2%
37	▼1	Portland International Airport	Portland	United States	11,806,921	▲66.7%
38	Steady	William P. Hobby Airport	Houston	United States	11,307,392	▲74.6%
39	▲2	St. Louis Lambert International Airport	St. Louis	United States	10,351,533	▲64.2%
40	▲2	Southwest Florida International Airport	Fort Myers	United States	10,322,434	▲72.7%
41	▲3	Sacramento International Airport	Sacramento	United States	9,702,030	▲73.8%
42	▲7	Luis Muñoz Marín International Airport	San Juan	Puerto Rico (U.S.)	9,684,227	▲99.9%
43	▼3	Tijuana International Airport	Tijuana	Mexico	9,665,844	▲53.16%
44	▲4	Raleigh–Durham International Airport	Raleigh, Durham	United States	8,795,128	▲80.1%
45	▲2	Monterrey International Airport	Monterrey	Mexico	8,269,834	▲65.59%
46	▲4	Oakland International Airport	Oakland	United States	8,142,320	▲76.2
47	▼1	Louis Armstrong New Orleans International Airport	New Orleans	United States	8,066,869	▲52.5%
48	New entry	John Wayne Airport	Santa Ana/Orange County, California	United States	7,700,489	▲30.8%
49	New entry	Kansas City International Airport	Kansas City	United States	7,666,162	▲76.7%
50	New entry	San Antonio International Airport	San Antonio	United States	7,464,662	▲85.3%

== 2020 ==
2020 North American Top airports
Rank	Rank change 19–20	Airport	City served	Country	Passengers	Annual change
1	Steady	Hartsfield–Jackson Atlanta International Airport	Atlanta	United States	42,918,685	▼61.17%
2	▲2	Dallas/Fort Worth International Airport	Dallas–Fort Worth	United States	39,364,990	▼47.56%
3	▲2	Denver International Airport	Denver	United States	33,741,129	▼51.11%
4	Steady	O'Hare International Airport	Chicago	United States	30,860,251	▼63.54%
5	▼2	Los Angeles International Airport	Los Angeles	United States	28,779,527	▼67.32%
6	▲7	Charlotte Douglas International Airport	Charlotte	United States	27,205,082	▼45.57%
7	▲2	Harry Reid International Airport	Las Vegas	United States	22,255,395	▼56.95%
8	▲4	Mexico City International Airport	Mexico City	Mexico	21,981,711	▼56.31%
9	▲6	Phoenix Sky Harbor International Airport	Phoenix	United States	21,928,708	▼52.63%
10	Steady	Orlando International Airport	Orlando	United States	21,617,803	▼57.29%
11	▼3	Seattle–Tacoma International Airport	Seattle-Tacoma	United States	20,061,507	▼61.29%
12	▲4	Miami International Airport	Miami	United States	18,663,858	▼59.36%
13	▲4	George Bush Intercontinental Airport	Houston	United States	18,213,913	▼59.77%
14	▼8	John F. Kennedy International Airport	New York City	United States	16,630,642	▼73.41%
15	▲6	Fort Lauderdale-Hollywood International Airport	Fort Lauderdale	United States	16,484,132	▼55.14%
16	▼9	San Francisco International Airport	San Francisco	United States	16,427,801	▼71.39%
17	▼3	Newark Liberty International Airport	Newark	United States	15,892,892	▼65.70%
18	▲1	Minneapolis–Saint Paul International Airport	Minneapolis-Saint Paul	United States	14,851,289	▼62.45%
19	▲1	Detroit Metropolitan Airport	Detroit	United States	14,105,007	▼61.64%
20	▼9	Toronto Pearson International Airport	Toronto	Canada	13,399,694	▼73.47%
21	▼3	Logan International Airport	Boston	United States	12,635,325	▼70.33%
22	▲3	Salt Lake City International Airport	Salt Lake City	United States	12,559,026	▼53.15%
23	▲4	Cancún International Airport	Cancún	Mexico	12,259,148	▼51.89%
24	▼2	Philadelphia International Airport	Philadelphia	United States	11,865,006	▼64.07%
25	▼1	Baltimore/Washington International Airport	Baltimore-Washington	United States	11,204,511	▼58.49%
26	▲5	Tampa International Airport	Tampa	United States	10,238,151	▼54.43%
27	▲1	San Diego International Airport	San Diego	United States	9,238,882	▼63.36%
28	▲5	Midway International Airport	Chicago	United States	8,853,948	▼57.52%
29	▲7	Nashville International Airport	Nashville	United States	8,309,337	▼54.86%
30	▼7	LaGuardia Airport	New York City	United States	8,245,192	▼73.48%
31	▼2	Dulles International Airport	Washington	United States	8,209,615	▼66.74%
32	▲10	Guadalajara International Airport	Guadalajara	Mexico	8,125,600	▼45.27%
33	▲6	Dallas Love Field	Dallas	United States	7,684,653	▼54.20%
34	▼4	Ronald Reagan Washington National Airport	Washington	United States	7,557,405	▼68.40%
35	▼9	Vancouver International Airport	Vancouver	Canada	7,301,875	▼72.34%
36	▼1	Portland International Airport	Portland	United States	7,084,543	▼64.38%
37	▼5	Daniel K. Inouye International Airport	Honolulu	United States	6,595,351	▼69.66%
38	▲5	William P. Hobby Airport	Houston	United States	6,476,309	▼55.20%
39	▼1	Austin–Bergstrom International Airport	Austin	United States	6,472,579	▼62.68%
40	New entry	Tijuana International Airport	Tijuana	Mexico	6,316,000	▼29.24%
41	▼1	St. Louis Lambert International Airport	St. Louis	United States	6,302,402	▼60.31%
42	New entry	Southwest Florida International Airport	Fort Myers	United States	5,978,414	▼41.53%
43	▼6	Calgary International Airport	Calgary	Canada	5,675,483	▼68.40%
44	▲3	Sacramento International Airport	Sacramento	United States	5,583,052	▼57.62%
45	▼11	Montréal-Trudeau International Airport	Montréal	Canada	5,435,477	▼73.23%
46	▼1	Louis Armstrong New Orleans International Airport	New Orleans	United States	5,289,538	▼61.23%
47	▲2	Monterrey International Airport	Monterrey	Mexico	4,994,170	▼55.32%
48	▼4	Raleigh–Durham International Airport	Raleigh, Durham	United States	4,883,913	▼65.65%
49	New entry	Luis Muñoz Marín International Airport	San Juan	Puerto Rico (U.S.)	4,845,353	▼48.71%
50	▼9	San Jose International Airport	San Jose	United States	4,711,577	▼69.89%

== 2019 ==
2019 North American Top airports
Rank	Rank change 18–19	Airport	City served	Country	Passengers	Annual change
1	Steady	Hartsfield–Jackson Atlanta International Airport	Atlanta	United States	110,531,300	▲2.92%
2	Steady	Los Angeles International Airport	Los Angeles	United States	88,068,013	▲0.61%
3	Steady	O'Hare International Airport	Chicago	United States	84,649,115	▲1.69%
4	Steady	Dallas/Fort Worth International Airport	Dallas–Fort Worth	United States	75,066,956	▲8.62%
5	Steady	Denver International Airport	Denver	United States	69,015,703	▲7.01%
6	Steady	John F. Kennedy International Airport	New York City	United States	62,551,072	▲1.48%
7	Steady	San Francisco International Airport	San Francisco	United States	57,418,574	▼0.67%
8	▲1	Seattle–Tacoma International Airport	Seattle-Tacoma	United States	51,829,239	▲3.97%
9	▼1	McCarran International Airport	Las Vegas	United States	51,691,066	▲3.67%
10	▲2	Orlando International Airport	Orlando	United States	50,613,072	▲6.11%
11	▼1	Toronto Pearson International Airport	Toronto	Canada	50,496,804	▲2.02%
12	▼1	Mexico City International Airport	Mexico City	Mexico	50,308,049	▲5.47%
13	Steady	Charlotte Douglas International Airport	Charlotte	United States	50,168,783	▲8.01%
14	Steady	Newark Liberty International Airport	Newark	United States	46,336,452	▲1.06%
15	▲1	Phoenix Sky Harbor International Airport	Phoenix	United States	46,287,790	▲2.99%
16	▼1	Miami International Airport	Miami	United States	45,924,466	▲1.95%
17	Steady	George Bush Intercontinental Airport	Houston	United States	45,276,595	▲3.35%
18	Steady	Logan International Airport	Boston	United States	42,587,664	▲3.84%
19	Steady	Minneapolis–Saint Paul International Airport	Minneapolis-Saint Paul	United States	39,555,035	▲3.80%
20	▲1	Detroit Metropolitan Airport	Detroit	United States	36,769,279	▲4.35%
21	▼1	Fort Lauderdale-Hollywood International Airport	Fort Lauderdale	United States	36,747,622	▲2.18%
22	Steady	Philadelphia International Airport	Philadelphia	United States	33,018,886	▲4.19%
23	Steady	LaGuardia Airport	New York City	United States	31,084,894	▲3.29%
24	Steady	Baltimore/Washington International Airport	Baltimore-Washington	United States	26,992,859	▼0.61%
25	▲1	Salt Lake City International Airport	Salt Lake City	United States	26,808,014	▲4.91%
26	▼1	Vancouver International Airport	Vancouver	Canada	26,401,443	▲1.46%
27	Steady	Cancún International Airport	Cancún	Mexico	25,481,989	▲1.11%
28	Steady	San Diego International Airport	San Diego	United States	25,216,947	▲4.04%
29	Steady	Dulles International Airport	Washington	United States	24,686,236	▲3.27%
30	Steady	Ronald Reagan Washington National Airport	Washington	United States	23,913,359	▲2.06%
31	▲1	Tampa International Airport	Tampa	United States	22,497,953	▲5.68%
32	▲1	Daniel K. Inouye International Airport	Honolulu	United States	21,735,558	▲3.55%
33	▼2	Midway International Airport	Chicago	United States	20,844,860	▼5.37%
34	▲1	Montréal-Trudeau International Airport	Montréal	Canada	20,305,106	▲4.51%
35	▼1	Portland International Airport	Portland	United States	19,891,365	▲0.04%
36	▲2	Nashville International Airport	Nashville	United States	18,273,434	▲14.24%
37	▼1	Calgary International Airport	Calgary	Canada	17,957,780	▲3.54%
38	▲1	Austin–Bergstrom International Airport	Austin	United States	17,343,729	▲9.63%
39	▼2	Dallas Love Field	Dallas	United States	16,780,158	▲3.40%
40	Steady	St. Louis Lambert International Airport	St. Louis	United States	15,878,527	▲1.57%
41	▲2	San Jose International Airport	San Jose	United States	15,650,444	▲9.30%
42	Steady	Guadalajara International Airport	Guadalajara	Mexico	14,846,329	▲12.21%
43	▼2	William P. Hobby Airport	Houston	United States	14,455,307	▼0.15%
44	▲2	Raleigh–Durham International Airport	Raleigh, Durham	United States	14,218,621	▲11.07%
45	Steady	Louis Armstrong New Orleans International Airport	New Orleans	United States	13,644,666	▲3.98%
46	▼2	Oakland International Airport	Oakland	United States	13,378,411	▼1.69%
47	Steady	Sacramento International Airport	Sacramento	United States	13,172,840	▲9.31%
48	Steady	Kansas City International Airport	Kansas City	United States	11,795,635	▼0.47%
49	Steady	Monterrey International Airport	Monterrey	Mexico	11,176,555	▲4.13%
50	Steady	John Wayne Airport	Orange County	United States	10,656,986	▼0.07%

== 2018 ==
2018 North American Top airports
Rank	Rank change 17–18	Airport	City served	Country	Passengers	Annual change
1	Steady	Hartsfield–Jackson Atlanta International Airport	Atlanta	United States	107,394,029	▲3.33%
2	Steady	Los Angeles International Airport	Los Angeles	United States	87,534,384	▲3.52%
3	Steady	O'Hare International Airport	Chicago	United States	83,245,472	▲4.28%
4	Steady	Dallas/Fort Worth International Airport	Dallas–Fort Worth	United States	69,112,607	▲3.01%
5	Steady	Denver International Airport	Denver	United States	64,494,613	▲5.08%
6	Steady	John F. Kennedy International Airport	New York City	United States	61,623,756	▲3.61%
7	Steady	San Francisco International Airport	San Francisco	United States	57,738,840	▲3.43%
8	Steady	McCarran International Airport	Las Vegas	United States	49,863,090	▲2.67%
9	▲1	Seattle–Tacoma International Airport	Seattle-Tacoma	United States	49,849,520	▲6.21%
10	▼1	Toronto Pearson International Airport	Toronto	Canada	49,507,418	▲5.04%
11	▲1	Mexico City International Airport	Mexico City	Mexico	47,700,547	▲6.64%
12	▲1	Orlando International Airport	Orlando	United States	47,696,627	▲6.92%
13	▼2	Charlotte Douglas International Airport	Charlotte	United States	46,447,638	▲1.17%
14	▲2	Newark Liberty International Airport	Newark	United States	45,851,434	▲6.08%
15	▼1	Miami International Airport	Miami	United States	45,044,312	▲2.21%
16	▼1	Phoenix Sky Harbor International Airport	Phoenix	United States	44,943,686	▲2.33%
17	Steady	George Bush Intercontinental Airport	Houston	United States	43,807,539	▲7.65%
18	Steady	Logan International Airport	Boston	United States	41,014,471	▲6.66%
19	Steady	Minneapolis–Saint Paul International Airport	Minneapolis-Saint Paul	United States	38,107,381	▲0.19%
20	▲1	Fort Lauderdale-Hollywood International Airport	Fort Lauderdale	United States	35,963,370	▲10.62%
21	▼1	Detroit Metropolitan Airport	Detroit	United States	35,236,676	▲1.54%
22	Steady	Philadelphia International Airport	Philadelphia	United States	31,691,956	▲7.12%
23	Steady	LaGuardia Airport	New York City	United States	30,094,074	▲1.80%
24	Steady	Baltimore/Washington International Airport	Baltimore-Washington	United States	27,130,655	▲2.89%
25	Steady	Vancouver International Airport	Vancouver	Canada	26,015,573	▲6.93%
26	Steady	Salt Lake City International Airport	Salt Lake City	United States	25,554,244	▲5.60%
27	Steady	Cancún International Airport	Cancún	Mexico	25,202,016	▲6.78%
28	▲3	San Diego International Airport	San Diego	United States	24,238,300	▲9.31%
29	Steady	Dulles International Airport	Washington	United States	23,905,282	▲5.23%
30	▼2	Ronald Reagan Washington National Airport	Washington	United States	23,430,564	▼1.82%
31	▼1	Midway International Airport	Chicago	United States	22,027,737	▼1.93%
32	▲1	Tampa International Airport	Tampa	United States	21,289,390	▲8.48%
33	▼1	Daniel K. Inouye International Airport	Honolulu	United States	20,866,873	▼2.39%
34	Steady	Portland International Airport	Portland	United States	19,882,788	▲4.20%
35	Steady	Montréal-Trudeau International Airport	Montréal	Canada	19,425,488	▲6.97%
36	Steady	Calgary International Airport	Calgary	Canada	17,343,402	▲6.56%
37	Steady	Dallas Love Field	Dallas	United States	16,229,151	▲3.22%
38	▲1	Nashville International Airport	Nashville	United States	15,996,029	▲13.18%
39	▲1	Austin–Bergstrom International Airport	Austin	United States	15,819,912	▲13.90%
40	▼2	St. Louis Lambert International Airport	St. Louis	United States	15,632,586	▲6.12%
41	Steady	William P. Hobby Airport	Houston	United States	14,476,469	▲7.75%
42	▲1	Guadalajara International Airport	Guadalajara	Mexico	14,340,152	▲12.21%
43	▲1	San Jose International Airport	San Jose	United States	14,319,292	▲14.74%
44	▼2	Oakland International Airport	Oakland	United States	13,594,251	▲3.99%
45	Steady	Louis Armstrong New Orleans International Airport	New Orleans	United States	13,122,762	▲7.20%
46	Steady	Raleigh–Durham International Airport	Raleigh, Durham	United States	12,801,697	▲9.68%
47	▲1	Sacramento International Airport	Sacramento	United States	12,050,763	▲10.44%
48	▼1	Kansas City International Airport	Kansas City	United States	11,850,839	▲3.02%
49	▲1	Monterrey International Airport	Monterrey	Mexico	10,733,186	▲10.84%
50	▼1	John Wayne Airport	Orange County	United States	10,664,038	▲2.31%

== 2017 ==
2017 North American Top airports
Rank	Rank change 16–17	Airport	City served	Country	Passengers	Annual change
1	Steady	Hartsfield–Jackson Atlanta International Airport	Atlanta	United States	103,902,992	▼0.26%
2	Steady	Los Angeles International Airport	Los Angeles	United States	84,557,968	▲4.49%
3	Steady	O'Hare International Airport	Chicago	United States	79,828,183	▲2.40%
4	Steady	Dallas/Fort Worth International Airport	Dallas–Fort Worth	United States	67,092,194	▲2.28%
5	▲1	Denver International Airport	Denver	United States	61,379,396	▲5.34%
6	▼1	John F. Kennedy International Airport	New York City	United States	59,392,500	▲0.49%
7	Steady	San Francisco International Airport	San Francisco	United States	55,822,129	▲5.12%
8	Steady	McCarran International Airport	Las Vegas	United States	48,565,117	▲2.25%
9	▲3	Toronto Pearson International Airport	Toronto	Canada	47,130,358	▲6.31%
10	▼1	Seattle–Tacoma International Airport	Seattle-Tacoma	United States	46,934,194	▲2.62%
11	Steady	Charlotte Douglas International Airport	Charlotte	United States	45,909,899	▲3.35%
12	▲3	Mexico City International Airport	Mexico City	Mexico	44,732,418	▲7.25%
13	▲1	Orlando International Airport	Orlando	United States	44,611,265	▲6.41%
14	▼4	Miami International Airport	Miami	United States	44,071,313	▼1.15%
15	▼2	Phoenix Sky Harbor International Airport	Phoenix	United States	43,921,670	▲1.24%
16	▲1	Newark Liberty International Airport	Newark	United States	43,234,161	▲6.58%
17	▼1	George Bush Intercontinental Airport	Houston	United States	40,696,189	▼2.23%
18	▲1	Logan International Airport	Boston	United States	38,454,539	▲5.77%
19	▼1	Minneapolis–Saint Paul International Airport	Minneapolis-Saint Paul	United States	38,034,341	▲1.41%
20	Steady	Detroit Metropolitan Airport	Detroit	United States	34,701,497	▲0.87%
21	▲2	Fort Lauderdale-Hollywood International Airport	Fort Lauderdale	United States	32,511,053	▲11.32%
22	▼1	Philadelphia International Airport	Philadelphia	United States	29,585,754	▼1.89%
23	▼1	LaGuardia Airport	New York City	United States	29,568,304	▼0.73%
24	Steady	Baltimore/Washington International Airport	Baltimore-Washington	United States	26,369,411	▲4.96%
25	▲3	Vancouver International Airport	Vancouver	Canada	24,328,872	▲8.38%
26	Steady	Salt Lake City International Airport	Salt Lake City	United States	24,198,816	▲4.50%
27	▲3	Cancún International Airport	Cancún	Mexico	23,601,502	▲10.21%
28	▼3	Ronald Reagan Washington National Airport	Washington	United States	23,863,775	▲1.23%
29	Steady	Dulles International Airport	Washington	United States	22,716,399	▲4.08%
30	▼3	Midway International Airport	Chicago	United States	22,460,236	▼0.96%
31	Steady	San Diego International Airport	San Diego	United States	22,173,493	▲6.98%
32	Steady	Daniel K. Inouye International Airport	Honolulu	United States	21,377,989	▲7.54%
33	Steady	Tampa International Airport	Tampa	United States	19,624,284	▲3.66%
34	Steady	Portland International Airport	Portland	United States	19,080,494	▲3.97%
35	Steady	Montréal-Trudeau International Airport	Montréal	Canada	18,159,223	▲9.47%
36	Steady	Calgary International Airport	Calgary	Canada	16,275,862	▲3.80%
37	Steady	Dallas Love Field	Dallas	United States	15,723,617	▲1.03%
38	Steady	St. Louis Lambert International Airport	St. Louis	United States	14,730,441	▲5.53%
39	Steady	Nashville International Airport	Nashville	United States	14,133,829	▲8.89%
40	▲1	Austin–Bergstrom International Airport	Austin	United States	13,889,305	▲11.68%
41	▼1	William P. Hobby Airport	Houston	United States	13,435,672	▲4.08%
42	Steady	Oakland International Airport	Oakland	United States	13,072,245	▲8.30%
43	▲1	Guadalajara International Airport	Guadalajara	Mexico	12,779,874	▲12.47%
44	▲3	San Jose International Airport	San Jose	United States	12,480,232	▲15.59%
45	▼2	Louis Armstrong New Orleans International Airport	New Orleans	United States	12,241,172	▲7.79%
46	▼1	Raleigh–Durham International Airport	Raleigh, Durham	United States	11,671,693	▲5.63%
47	▼1	Kansas City International Airport	Kansas City	United States	11,503,940	▲4.19%
48	▲1	Sacramento International Airport	Sacramento	United States	10,912,079	▲7.84%
49	▼1	John Wayne Airport	Orange County	United States	10,423,578	▼0.70%
50	Steady	Monterrey International Airport	Monterrey	Mexico	9,683,140	▲5.50%

== 2016 ==
2016 North American Top airports
Rank	Rank change 15–16	Airport	City served	Country	Passengers	Annual change
1	Steady	Hartsfield–Jackson Atlanta International Airport	Atlanta	United States	104,171,935	▲2.64%
2	▲1	Los Angeles International Airport	Los Angeles	United States	80,921,527	▲7.96%
3	▼1	O'Hare International Airport	Chicago	United States	77,960,588	▲1.31%
4	Steady	Dallas/Fort Worth International Airport	Dallas–Fort Worth	United States	65,670,697	▲0.24%
5	Steady	John F. Kennedy International Airport	New York City	United States	59,105,513	▲3.90%
6	Steady	Denver International Airport	Denver	United States	58,266,515	▲7.87%
7	Steady	San Francisco International Airport	San Francisco	United States	53,099,282	▲6.08%
8	Steady	McCarran International Airport	Las Vegas	United States	47,496,614	▲4.52%
9	▲4	Seattle–Tacoma International Airport	Seattle-Tacoma	United States	45,736,700	▲8.02%
10	Steady	Miami International Airport	Miami	United States	44,584,603	▲0.53%
11	▼2	Charlotte Douglas International Airport	Charlotte	United States	44,422,022	▼1.01%
12	▲2	Toronto Pearson International Airport	Toronto	Canada	44,335,198	▲8.04%
13	▼2	Phoenix Sky Harbor International Airport	Phoenix	United States	43,302,381	▼1.59%
14	▲1	Orlando International Airport	Orlando	United States	41,923,399	▲8.02%
15	▲1	Mexico City International Airport	Mexico City	Mexico	41,710,254	▲8.53%
16	▼4	George Bush Intercontinental Airport	Houston	United States	41,622,594	▼3.26%
17	Steady	Newark Liberty International Airport	Newark	United States	40,563,285	▲8.17%
18	Steady	Minneapolis–Saint Paul International Airport	Minneapolis-Saint Paul	United States	37,413,728	▲2.27%
19	Steady	Logan International Airport	Boston	United States	36,356,917	▲8.48%
20	Steady	Detroit Metropolitan Airport	Detroit	United States	34,401,254	▲2.87%
21	Steady	Philadelphia International Airport	Philadelphia	United States	30,155,090	▼4.10%
22	Steady	LaGuardia Airport	New York City	United States	29,786,769	▲4.74%
23	Steady	Fort Lauderdale-Hollywood International Airport	Fort Lauderdale	United States	29,205,002	▲8.40%
24	Steady	Baltimore/Washington International Airport	Baltimore-Washington	United States	25,122,651	▲5.45%
25	Steady	Ronald Reagan Washington National Airport	Washington	United States	23,568,586	▲2.42%
26	▲1	Salt Lake City International Airport	Salt Lake City	United States	23,157,445	▲4.54%
27	▼1	Midway International Airport	Chicago	United States	22,677,859	▲2.05%
28	▲1	Vancouver International Airport	Vancouver	Canada	22,447,883	▲9.57%
29	▼1	Washington Dulles International Airport	Washington	United States	21,817,340	▲1.48%
30	▲2	Cancún International Airport	Cancún	Mexico	21,415,795	▲9.28%
31	▼1	San Diego International Airport	San Diego	United States	20,725,801	▲3.21%
32	▼1	Daniel K. Inouye International Airport	Honolulu	United States	19,878,659	▲0.05%
33	Steady	Tampa International Airport	Tampa	United States	18,931,922	▲0.62%
34	Steady	Portland International Airport	Portland	United States	18,352,767	▲8.91%
35	Steady	Montréal-Trudeau International Airport	Montréal	Canada	16,610,483	▲7.04%
36	Steady	Calgary International Airport	Calgary	Canada	15,680,616	▲1.32%
37	Steady	Dallas Love Field	Dallas	United States	15,562,738	▲7.35%
38	Steady	St. Louis Lambert International Airport	St. Louis	United States	13,959,126	▲9.52%
39	▲2	Nashville International Airport	Nashville	United States	12,979,803	▲11.19%
40	▼1	William P. Hobby Airport	Houston	United States	12,909,075	▲6.13%
41	▼1	Austin–Bergstrom International Airport	Austin	United States	12,436,849	▲4.53%
42	Steady	Oakland International Airport	Oakland	United States	12,070,967	▲7.73%
43	Steady	Louis Armstrong New Orleans International Airport	New Orleans	United States	11,365,487	▲4.57%
44	▲4	Guadalajara International Airport	Guadalajara	Mexico	11,362,552	▲16.8%
45	▲1	Raleigh–Durham International Airport	Raleigh, Durham	United States	11,049,143	▲11.12%
46	▼2	Kansas City International Airport	Kansas City	United States	11,041,767	▲5.44%
47	Steady	San Jose International Airport	San Jose	United States	10,796,725	▲10.17%
48	▼3	John Wayne Airport	Orange County	United States	10,496,511	▲3.11%
49	Steady	Sacramento International Airport	Sacramento	United States	10,118,794	▲5.30%
50	▲	Monterrey International Airport	Monterrey	Mexico	9,178,533	▲8.46%

== 2015 ==
2015 North American Top airports
Rank	Rank change 14–15	Airport	City served	Country	Passengers	Annual change
1	Steady	Hartsfield–Jackson Atlanta International Airport	Atlanta	United States	101,491,106	▲5.52%
2	▲1	O'Hare International Airport	Chicago	United States	76,949,504	▲9.81%
3	▼1	Los Angeles International Airport	Los Angeles	United States	74,937,004	▲6.05%
4	Steady	Dallas/Fort Worth International Airport	Dallas–Fort Worth	United States	64,074,762	▲0.30%
5	▲1	John F. Kennedy International Airport	New York City	United States	56,827,154	▲6.78%
6	▼1	Denver International Airport	Denver	United States	54,014,502	▲1.01%
7	Steady	San Francisco International Airport	San Francisco	United States	50,057,887	▲6.25%
8	▲1	McCarran International Airport	Las Vegas	United States	45,443,900	▲5.75%
9	▼1	Charlotte Douglas International Airport	Charlotte	United States	44,876,627	▲1.35%
10	▲2	Miami International Airport	Miami	United States	44,350,247	▲8.33%
11	▼1	Phoenix Sky Harbor International Airport	Phoenix	United States	44,003,840	▲4.51%
12	▼1	George Bush Intercontinental Airport	Houston	United States	43,023,224	▲4.29%
13	▲1	Seattle–Tacoma International Airport	Seattle-Tacoma	United States	42,340,537	▲12.91%
14	▼1	Toronto Pearson International Airport	Toronto	Canada	41,036,847	▲6.39%
15	Steady	Orlando International Airport	Orlando	United States	38,727,749	▲8.44%
16	▲2	Mexico City International Airport	Mexico City	Mexico	38,433,078	▲12.19%
17	▼1	Newark Liberty International Airport	Newark	United States	37,494,704	▲5.29%
18	▼1	Minneapolis–Saint Paul International Airport	Minneapolis-Saint Paul	United States	36,582,854	▲4.09%
19	▲1	Logan International Airport	Boston	United States	33,515,905	▲5.87%
20	▼1	Detroit Metropolitan Airport	Detroit	United States	33,440,112	▲2.85%
21	Steady	Philadelphia International Airport	Philadelphia	United States	31,444,403	▲2.29%
22	Steady	LaGuardia Airport	New York City	United States	28,437,668	▲5.50%
23	Steady	Fort Lauderdale-Hollywood International Airport	Fort Lauderdale	United States	26,941,671	▲9.30%
24	Steady	Baltimore/Washington International Airport	Baltimore-Washington	United States	23,823,532	▲6.77%
25	Steady	Ronald Reagan Washington National Airport	Washington	United States	23,012,191	▲10.72%
26	▲1	Midway International Airport	Chicago	United States	22,221,499	▲4.92%
27	▼1	Salt Lake City International Airport	Salt Lake City	United States	22,152,498	▲4.78%
28	Steady	Dulles International Airport	Washington	United States	21,498,902	▲0.37%
29	▲1	Vancouver International Airport	Vancouver	Canada	20,486,935	▲5.16%
30	▲1	San Diego International Airport	San Diego	United States	20,081,258	▲7.05%
31	▼2	Daniel K. Inouye International Airport	Honolulu	United States	19,869,707	▲1.51%
32	▲1	Cancún International Airport	Cancún	Mexico	19,596,485	▲12.27%
33	▼1	Tampa International Airport	Tampa	United States	18,815,425	▲7.19%
34	Steady	Portland International Airport	Portland	United States	16,850,952	▲5.87%
35	▲1	Montréal-Trudeau International Airport	Montréal	Canada	15,511,116	▲4.66%
36	▼1	Calgary International Airport	Calgary	Canada	15,475,759	▲1.41%
37	▲8	Dallas Love Field	Dallas	United States	14,497,498	▲54.00%
38	▼1	St. Louis Lambert International Airport	St. Louis	United States	12,752,331	▲2.97%
39	▼1	William P. Hobby Airport	Houston	United States	12,163,344	▲1.80%
40	Steady	Austin–Bergstrom International Airport	Austin	United States	11,897,959	▲11.00%
41	▼2	Nashville International Airport	Nashville	United States	11,673,633	▲5.74%
42	▼1	Oakland International Airport	Oakland	United States	11,205,063	▲8.40%
43	Steady	Louis Armstrong New Orleans International Airport	New Orleans	United States	10,868,827	▲9.31%
44	▼2	Kansas City International Airport	Kansas City	United States	10,472,461	▲3.01%
45	▲1	John Wayne Airport	Orange County	United States	10,180,258	▲8.46%
46	▼2	Raleigh–Durham International Airport	Raleigh, Durham	United States	9,943,331	▲4.18%
47	Steady	San Jose International Airport	San Jose	United States	9,799,427	▲4.41%
48	▲1	Guadalajara International Airport	Guadalajara	Mexico	9,758,516	▲11.7%
49	▼1	Sacramento International Airport	Sacramento	United States	9,609,880	▲7.10%
50	Steady	Luis Muñoz Marín International Airport	San Juan	Puerto Rico (U.S.)	8,733,161	▲1.90%

== 2014 ==
2014 North American Top airports
Rank	Rank change 13–14	Airport	City served	Country	Passengers	Annual change
1	Steady	Hartsfield–Jackson Atlanta International Airport	Atlanta	United States	96,178,899	▲1.9%
2	▲1	Los Angeles International Airport	Los Angeles	United States	70,663,265	▲6.0%
3	▼1	O'Hare International Airport	Chicago	United States	69,999,010	▲4.5%
4	Steady	Dallas/Fort Worth International Airport	Dallas–Fort Worth	United States	63,554,402	▲5.1%
5	Steady	Denver International Airport	Denver	United States	53,472,514	▲1.7%
6	Steady	John F. Kennedy International Airport	New York City	United States	53,254,533	▲5.6%
7	Steady	San Francisco International Airport	San Francisco	United States	47,114,631	▲4.8%
8	Steady	Charlotte Douglas International Airport	Charlotte	United States	44,279,504	▲1.9%
9	Steady	McCarran International Airport	Las Vegas	United States	42,869,517	▲4.7%
10	▲1	Phoenix Sky Harbor International Airport	Phoenix	United States	42,134,662	▲4.4%
11	▲1	George Bush Intercontinental Airport	Houston	United States	41,239,700	▲3.6%
12	▼2	Miami International Airport	Miami	United States	40,941,879	▲0.9%
13	Steady	Toronto Pearson International Airport	Toronto	Canada	38,572,416	▲6.8%
14	▲1	Seattle–Tacoma International Airport	Seattle-Tacoma	United States	37,498,267	▲7.7%
15	▲1	Orlando International Airport	Orlando	United States	35,714,091	▲2.7%
16	▼2	Newark Liberty International Airport	Newark	United States	35,610,759	▲1.7%
17	Steady	Minneapolis–Saint Paul International Airport	Minneapolis-Saint Paul	United States	35 147 083	▲3.7%
18	▲1	Mexico City International Airport	Mexico City	Mexico	34,255,739	▲8.6%
19	▼1	Detroit Metropolitan Airport	Detroit	United States	32,513,555	▲0.4%
20	▲1	Logan International Airport	Boston	United States	31,658,351	▲4.7%
21	▼1	Philadelphia International Airport	Philadelphia	United States	30,740,180	▲0.8%
22	Steady	LaGuardia Airport	New York City	United States	26,954,588	▲1.0%
23	Steady	Fort Lauderdale-Hollywood International Airport	Fort Lauderdale	United States	24,648,306	▲4.6%
24	Steady	Baltimore/Washington International Airport	Baltimore-Washington	United States	22,312,676	▼0.8%
25	▲1	Ronald Reagan Washington National Airport	Washington	United States	21,420,385	▼1.7%
26	▲2	Salt Lake City International Airport	Salt Lake City	United States	21,141,610	▲4.7%
27	Steady	Midway International Airport	Chicago	United States	21,069,564	▲3.5%
28	▼3	Dulles International Airport	Washington	United States	20,784,384	▲1.9%
29	Steady	Daniel K. Inouye International Airport	Honolulu	United States	19,972,910	▲1.0%
30	Steady	Vancouver International Airport	Vancouver	Canada	19 482 626	▲7.5%
31	Steady	San Diego International Airport	San Diego	United States	18,758,751	▲5.9%
32	Steady	Tampa International Airport	Tampa	United States	17,552,707	▲3.7%
33	Steady	Cancún International Airport	Cancún	Mexico	17,455,353	▲9.4%
34	Steady	Portland International Airport	Portland	United States	15,916,512	▲5.9%
35	Steady	Calgary International Airport	Calgary	Canada	15,261,108	▲6.6%
36	Steady	Montréal-Trudeau International Airport	Montréal	Canada	14,821,100	▲5.2%
37	Steady	St. Louis Lambert International Airport	St. Louis	United States	12,384,015	▼1.5%
38	Steady	William P. Hobby Airport	Houston	United States	11,945,825	▲7.5%
39	Steady	Nashville International Airport	Nashville	United States	11,039,634	▲6.6%
40	Steady	Austin–Bergstrom International Airport	Austin	United States	10,718,854	▲7.0%
41	▲1	Oakland International Airport	Oakland	United States	10,718,854	▲6.1%
42	▼1	Kansas City International Airport	Kansas City	United States	10,166,881	▲3.0%
43	Steady	Louis Armstrong New Orleans International Airport	New Orleans	United States	9,942,767	▲6.4%
44	▲1	Raleigh–Durham International Airport	Raleigh, Durham	United States	9,463,598	▲2.9%
45	▲4	Dallas Love Field	Dallas	United States	9,413,636	▲11.1%
46	▼2	John Wayne Airport	Orange County	United States	9,386,033	▲1.7%
47	Steady	San Jose International Airport	San Jose	United States	9,385,212	▲6.9%
48	Steady	Sacramento International Airport	Sacramento	United States	8,972,756	▲3.3%
49	▲2	Guadalajara International Airport	Guadalajara	Mexico	8,695,183	▲7.2%
50	Steady	Luis Muñoz Marín International Airport	San Juan	Puerto Rico (U.S.)	8,569,622	▲2.7%

== 2013 ==
2013 North American Top airports
Rank	Airport	City served	Country	Passengers	Annual change
1	Hartsfield–Jackson Atlanta International Airport	Atlanta	United States	94,431,224	▼1.1%
3	O'Hare International Airport	Chicago	United States	66,777,161	▲0.2%
2	Los Angeles International Airport	Los Angeles	United States	66,667,619	▲4.7%
4	Dallas/Fort Worth International Airport	Dallas–Fort Worth	United States	60,470,507	▲3.2%
5	Denver International Airport	Denver	United States	52,556,359	▼1.1%
6	John F. Kennedy International Airport	New York City	United States	50,423,765	▲2.3%
7	San Francisco International Airport	San Francisco	United States	44,945,760	▲1.2%
8	Charlotte Douglas International Airport	Charlotte	United States	43,457,471	▲5.4%
9	McCarran International Airport	Las Vegas	United States	40,933,037	▲0.3%
10	Miami International Airport	Miami	United States	40,562,948	▲2.8%
11	Phoenix Sky Harbor International Airport	Phoenix	United States	40,341,614	▼0.3%
12	George Bush Intercontinental Airport	Houston	United States	39,799,414	▼0.2%
13	Toronto Pearson International Airport	Toronto	Canada	36,109,469	▲3.4%
14	Newark Liberty International Airport	Newark	United States	35,016,236	▲2.9%
15	Seattle–Tacoma International Airport	Seattle-Tacoma	United States	34,826,741	▲4.8%
16	Orlando International Airport	Orlando	United States	34,768,945	▼1.5%
17	Minneapolis–Saint Paul International Airport	Minneapolis-Saint Paul	United States	33,892,074	▲2.2%
18	Detroit Metropolitan Airport	Detroit	United States	32,389,544	▲0.5%
19	Mexico City International Airport	Mexico City	Mexico	31,534,638	▲6.9%
20	Philadelphia International Airport	Philadelphia	United States	30,504,112	▲0.8%
21	Logan International Airport	Boston	United States	30,235,850	▲3.3%
22	LaGuardia Airport	New York City	United States	26,722,183	▲3.9%
23	Fort Lauderdale-Hollywood International Airport	Fort Lauderdale	United States	23,559,779	▼0.04%
24	Baltimore/Washington International Airport	Baltimore-Washington	United States	22,498,353	▼0.8%
25	Dulles International Airport	Washington	United States	21,796,326	▼2.7%
26	Ronald Reagan Washington National Airport	Washington	United States	20,392,671	▲3.9%
27	Midway International Airport	Chicago	United States	20,362,601	▲4.9%
28	Salt Lake City International Airport	Salt Lake City	United States	20,186,474	▲0.4%
29	Daniel K. Inouye International Airport	Honolulu	United States	19,776,751	▲2.5%
30	Vancouver International Airport	Vancouver	Canada	18,117,835	▲2.1%
31	San Diego International Airport	San Diego	United States	17,710,241	▲2.7%
32	Tampa International Airport	Tampa	United States	16,920,086	▲0.6%
33	Cancún International Airport	Cancún	Mexico	15,962,162	▲10.4%
34	Portland International Airport	Portland	United States	15,029,569	▲4.4%
35	Calgary International Airport	Calgary	Canada	14,314,364	▲4.9%
36	Montréal-Trudeau International Airport	Montréal	Canada	14,095,182	▲2.1%
37	St. Louis Lambert International Airport	St. Louis	United States	12,570,128	▼0.9%
38	William P. Hobby Airport	Houston	United States	11,109,449	▲6.4%
39	Nashville International Airport	Nashville	United States	10,351,709	▲5.3%
40	Austin–Bergstrom International Airport	Austin	United States	10,017,958	▲6.2%
41	Kansas City International Airport	Kansas City	United States	9,872,314	▼1.3%
42	Oakland International Airport	Oakland	United States	9,742,887	▼3.0%
43	Louis Armstrong New Orleans International Airport	New Orleans	United States	9,344,806	▲7.0%
44	John Wayne Airport	Orange County	United States	9,232,789	▲4.2%
45	Raleigh–Durham International Airport	Raleigh, Durham	United States	9,197,760	▼0.2%
46	Cleveland Hopkins International Airport	Cleveland	United States	9,072,126	▲0.7%
47	San Jose International Airport	San Jose	United States	8,783,319	▲5.9%
48	Sacramento International Airport	Sacramento	United States	8,685,368	▼2.5%
49	Dallas Love Field	Dallas	United States	8,470,586	▲3.6%
50	Luis Muñoz Marín International Airport	San Juan	Puerto Rico (U.S.)	8,347,119	▼1.2%

== See also ==
- List of the busiest airports in the United States
- List of the busiest airports in Canada
- List of the busiest airports in Mexico
- List of the busiest airports in the Caribbean
- List of the busiest airports in Central America
