= Kaua =

Kaua may refer to:

- Kaua, Yucatán, locality in Mexico, seat of the below municipality
- Kaua Municipality, Yucatán, Mexico
- KAUA, former call sign of KBRA (95.9 FM), a radio station in Freer, Texas, United States

== Persons ==
- Atkin Kaua (b. 1996), Solomon Islands footballer
- Toswel Kaua (1947–2010), Solomon Islands politician
- Kaua (footballer) (b. 2003), Brazilian footballer

== See also ==
- Kauã (disambiguation)
- Kauai, one of the main Hawaiian Islands
