= Aeromaya Flight 322 =

1968 aircraft hijacking in Mexico

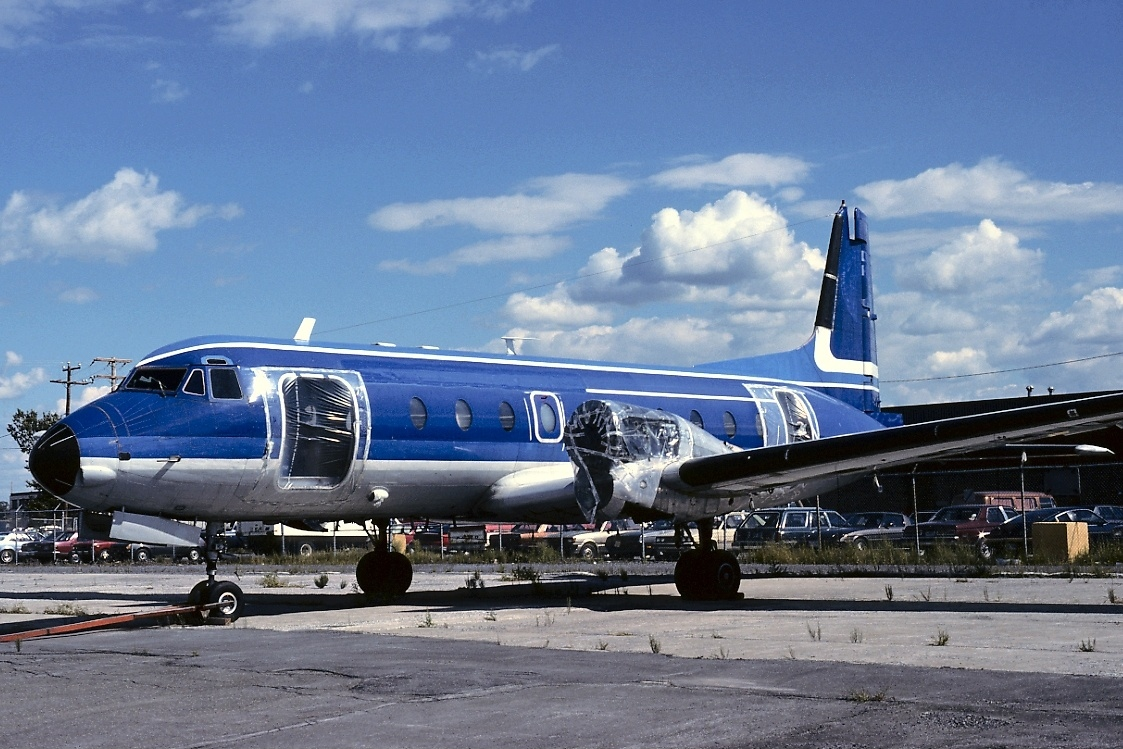
- A Hawker Siddeley HS-748 similar to the one involved

Occurrence
- Date: 6 October 1968
- Summary: hijacking

Aircraft
- Aircraft type: Hawker Siddeley HS-748-230 Srs. 2
- Operator: Aeromaya
- Registration: XA-SEY
- Flight origin: Mexico City International Airport
- 1st stopover: Campeche International Airport
- 2nd stopover: Chichen Itza International Airport
- 3rd stopover: Cozumel International Airport
- Destination: Isla Mujeres National Airport
- Occupants: 21
- Passengers: 17
- Crew: 4
- Fatalities: 0
- Injuries: 0
- Missing: 0
- Survivors: 21

The hijacking of Aeromaya Flight 322 was an event that occurred on October 6, 1968, and was operated by an HS 748 aircraft with registration XA-SEY and serial number 1599. The flight originated at Mexico City International Airport with its final destination being Isla Mujeres Airport, making intermediate stops at the airports of Campeche, Chichen Itzá and Cozumel. It was the first hijacking of an aircraft with a Mexican flag, registration and crew.

== Events ==
The aircraft was covering the last stop of its flight between Cozumel and Isla Mujeres when at 1:35 p.m., Judith Vázquez, an Argentine passenger, appeared in the cockpit brandishing a weapon and subsequently threatened the crew and demanded that they take her to Cuba, as she claimed that her life and that of her two children who were also on flight 322 were in danger for having been involved in the events of October 2nd.

The captain attempted to persuade Judith to desist from her actions, even attempting to head for Isla Mujeres, which the hijacker noticed and again demanded to head for Cuba. After communicating the events with Aeromaya headquarters and establishing contact with LANICA Flight 175 to receive radio frequency and runway vector information from Havana Airport (since the Aeromaya crew had never flown to Cuba), they headed for the Caribbean island.

A pair of passengers managed to disarm the woman before landing in Havana, realizing the weapon was a toy. However, there was not enough fuel, so they decided to continue on the same route. The aircraft landed at José Martí Airport at 3:43 p.m., escorted by two Cuban Air Force MIG aircraft.

Judith Vázquez was detained along with her two children by Cuban police, while the other passengers and crew were interrogated. After completing all the necessary bureaucratic procedures and refueling, the HS 748 departed at 8:05 p.m., this time heading for Mérida Airport, where they landed at 10:15 p.m.
