= Chichen Itza International Airport =

Airport in Yucatán, Mexico

Chichen Itzá International Airport Aeropuerto Internacional de Chichen Itzá
- IATA: CZA; ICAO: MMCT

Summary
- Airport type: Public
- Operator: Grupo CICLO
- Serves: Chichen Itza, Yucatán, Mexico
- Location: Kaua, Yucatán, Mexico
- Time zone: CST (UTC-06:00)
- Elevation AMSL: 31 m / 102 ft
- Coordinates: 20°38′28.66″N 88°26′46.39″W

Map
- Location of airport in Yucatán CZA (Mexico)

Runways
| Direction | Length | | Surface |
| Direction | m | ft | Surface |
|---|---|---|---|
| 10/28 | 2,800 | 9,186 | Concrete |

Statistics (2025)
- Total passengers: N/A
- Source: Agencia Federal de Aviación Civil

Chichen Itza International Airport (Spanish: Aeropuerto Internacional de Chichen Itzá) (IATA: CZA, ICAO: MMCT) is an international airport located in Kaua, Yucatán, Mexico. It serves air traffic for the archaeological site of Chichen Itzá. Operated by Grupo CICLO, the airport supports tourism, charter, and general aviation activities, and does not offer scheduled passenger public services. The nearest airports that offer commercial flights are Cancún International Airport and Mérida International Airport.

Situated at an elevation of 31 metres (102 ft) above mean sea level, the airport features a single concrete runway designated as 10/28, measuring 2,800 metres (9,200 ft). The commercial aviation apron includes three parking positions for narrow-body aircraft and additional stands for general aviation.

The passenger terminal is a single-story structure that houses both arrivals and departures facilities. The departures concourse features three gates with direct access to the apron, allowing passengers to board their planes by walking directly to the aircraft. The terminal's distinctive architecture features a thatched roof made from dried palm leaves, known as Palapas—a traditional construction technique often observed on Mexican beaches. Adjacent facilities include parking areas, civil aviation hangars, administration offices, courier and logistic facilities, and amenities for general aviation.

Officially inaugurated on April 12, 2000, the airport replaced an older facility located adjacent to the archaeological site of Chichen Itzá. Initially, Aeromexico, Mexicana, Aerocozumel, and American Airlines expressed interest in operating at the airport. However, due to profitability issues, the airport was never consistently operational. Over the years, the airport experienced intermittent service by airlines offering domestic and international flights.

== Statistics ==
=== Annual Traffic ===
Passenger statistics at Chichen Itza
| Year | Flights | Total Passengers | Cargo movements (t) | Year | Flights | Total Passengers | Cargo movements (t) |
| 2025 | 16 | 0 | 33,587 | 2008 | 0 | 0 | 0 |
| 2024 | 22 | 123 | 20,500 | 2007 | 3 | 54 | 0 |
| 2023 | 82 | 0 | 93,516 | 2006 | 0 | 0 | 0 |
| 2022 | 2 | 0 | 2,200 | 2005 | 2 | 150 | 0 |
| 2021 | 49 | 3,443 | 0 | 2004 | 0 | 0 | 0 |
| 2020 | 1 | 0 | 10,177 | 2003 | 4 | 48 | 0 |
| 2019 | 0 | 0 | 0 | 2002 | 67 | 1,043 | 0 |
| 2018 | 1 | 0 | 10,177 | 2001 | 68 | 754 | 0 |
| 2017 | 0 | 0 | 0 | 2000 | 2 | 100 | 0 |
| 2016 | 0 | 0 | 0 | 1999 | 24 | 339 | 0 |
| 2015 | 0 | 0 | 0 | 1998 | 766 | 7,071 | 35 |
| 2014 | 0 | 0 | 0 | 1997 | 884 | 11,606 | 0 |
| 2013 | 0 | 0 | 0 | 1996 | 923 | 19,985 | 86 |
| 2012 | 7 | 598 | 0 | 1995 | 771 | 17,711 | 0 |
| 2011 | 2 | 44 | 0 | 1994 | 1,290 | 29,982 | 0 |
| 2010 | 1 | 14 | 0 | 1993 | 1,107 | 27,336 | 0 |
| 2009 | 0 | 0 | 0 | 1992 | 1,045 | 28,827 | 15,868 |

== See also ==
- List of the busiest airports in Mexico
- List of airports in Mexico
- List of airports by ICAO code: M
- List of busiest airports in North America
- List of the busiest airports in Latin America
- Transportation in Mexico
- Tourism in Mexico
- Chichen Itzá
- Chichen Itzá railway station
