= Palenque International Airport =

International airport in Chiapas, Mexico

Palenque International Airport Aeropuerto Internacional de Palenque
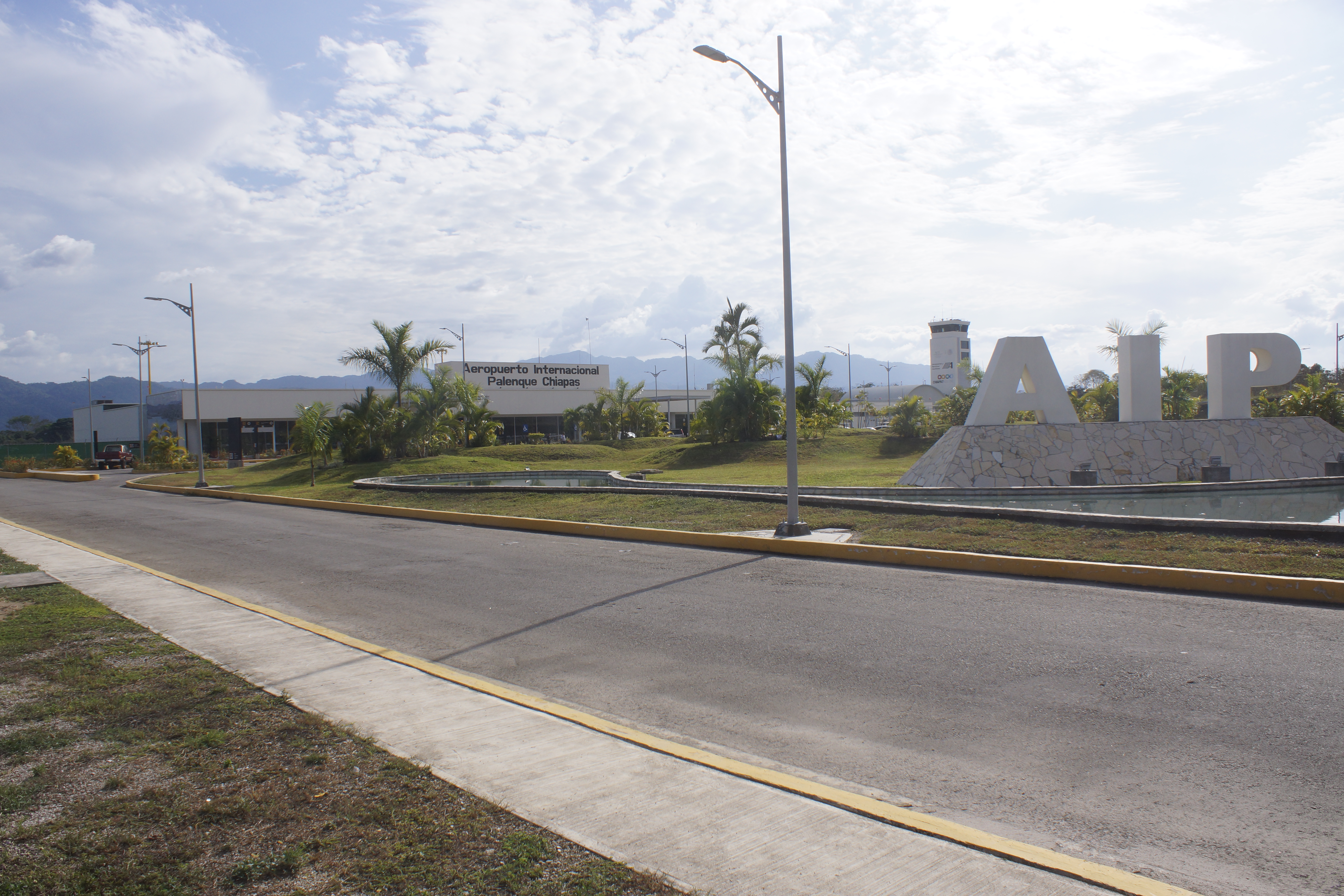
- IATA: PQM; ICAO: MMPQ

Summary
- Airport type: Public
- Operator: Grupo Olmeca-Maya-Mexica (GAFSACOMM)
- Serves: Palenque, Chiapas, Mexico
- Time zone: CST (UTC-06:00)
- Elevation AMSL: 50.3 m (165 ft)
- Coordinates: 17°32′06″N 092°00′54″W
- Website: www.grupomundomaya.com/PQM

Map
- Location within Chiapas Location within Mexico

Runways
Direction	Length		Surface
Direction	m	ft	Surface
10/28	2,500	8,202	Asphalt

Statistics (2025)
- Total passengers: 16,909
- Ranking in Mexico: 57th ▼1
- Source: Agencia Federal de Aviación Civil

Palenque International Airport (Spanish: Aeropuerto Internacional de Palenque) (IATA: PQM, ICAO: MMPQ) is an international airport in Palenque, Chiapas, Mexico. It serves international air traffic for the northern Chiapas region, including Palenque, serving domestic flights and supporting tourism, flight training, and general aviation activities.

Previously managed by Grupo Aeroportuario de Chiapas, the airport has been operated by Grupo Olmeca-Maya-Mexica (GAFSACOMM) since 2023, a holding company owned by the Mexican military. In terms of passenger traffic, the airport handled 16,909 passengers in 2025.

Officially inaugurated on March 13, 2014, the airport replaced an older facility located 3 km east. Interjet initiated bi-weekly service to Mexico City on that date, resulting in increased traffic to 18,148 passengers in 2015. The airport was declared international in 2016.

Over the years, regional airlines have provided occasional charter or limited commercial service to the airport. Calafia Airlines briefly operated the Puebla - Tuxtla Gutiérrez - Palenque - Cancún route in 2018. Magnicharters has also served occasional charter flights to Monterrey.

The Interjet service continued until its bankruptcy in 2020, and the airport was left without any regular scheduled service for nearly four years until Mexicana launched a new service in January 2024.

== Facilities ==
The airport is situated at an elevation of 50 metres (160 ft) above mean sea level, covering an area of 201 hectares (500 acres). It features a single asphalt runway, designated as 10/28, measuring 2,500 metres (8,200 ft). The commercial aviation apron spans 6,479 square metres (69,740 sq ft), featuring three parking positions for narrow-body aircraft and additional stands for general aviation. Official operating hours are from 9:00 to 18:00.

The passenger terminal caters to both domestic arrivals and departures in a single-story structure. It includes check-in areas, a security checkpoint, a baggage claim area, and an arrivals hall. The departures concourse includes three gates with direct access to the apron, allowing passengers to board their planes by walking to the aircraft. Adjacent facilities include parking areas, civil aviation hangars, administration offices, courier and logistic facilities, and facilities for general aviation.

On 1 January 2024, the new Tren Maya station called Palenque Train Station (Spanish: Estación de Palenque), situated 3 kilometres (1.9 mi) from the airport grounds opened, aiming to establish connectivity with the Yucatán Peninsula, including Tulum International Airport, Cancun International Airport, and other key tourist destinations in southeastern Mexico.

== Airlines and destinations ==
=== Passenger ===
Airlines	Destinations
Mexicana de Aviación	Mexico City–Felipe Ángeles

=== Destinations map ===
Domestic destinations from Palenque International Airport
Red = Year-round destination
Blue = Future destination
Green = Seasonal destination

== Statistics ==
=== Annual Traffic ===
Passenger statistics at Palenque Airport
Year	Air operations	change %	Total Passengers	change %
2013	692	n/d	1,754	n/d
2014	1,525	▲120.37%	17,304	▲886.54%
2015	1,046	▼31.40%	18,148	▲4.87%
2016	896	▼14.34%	17,242	▼4.99%
2017	726	▼18.97%	14,427	▼16.32%
2018	1,222	▲68.32%	17,482	▲21.18%
2019	625	▼48.85%	20,666	▲18.21%
2020	516	▼21.10%	6,399	▼69.04%
2021	553	▲7.17%	1,602	▼74.73%
2022	646	▲16.82%	1,602	0.0%
2023	895	▲38.54%	4,028	▲151.44%
2024	763	▼14.75%	11,127	▲176.41%%
2025	760	▼0.39%	16,909	▲51.96%

== See also ==
- List of the busiest airports in Mexico
- List of airports in Mexico
- List of airports by ICAO code: M
- List of busiest airports in North America
- List of the busiest airports in Latin America
- Transportation in Mexico
- Tourism in Mexico
- Tren Maya
- Palenque railway station
