= Mexicana de Aviación (2023–present) =

Airline of Mexico

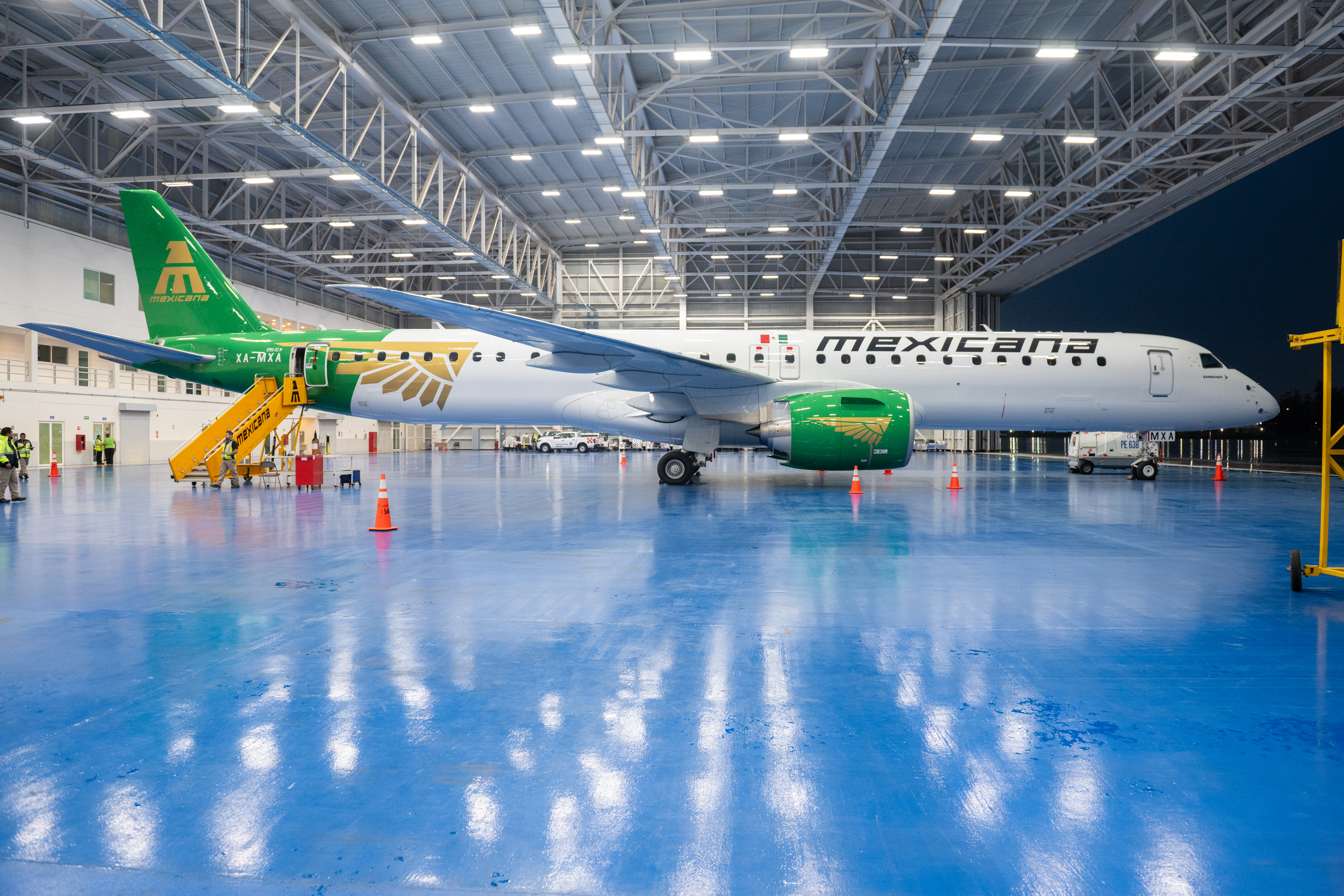
- An Embraer E195-E2
IATA	ICAO	Call sign
XN	MXA	MEXICANA
- Founded: 15 June 2023; 3 years ago
- Commenced operations: 26 December 2023; 2 years ago
- Hubs: Felipe Ángeles International Airport
- Fleet size: 10
- Destinations: 20
- Parent company: SEDENA
- Headquarters: Ex hacienda de Santa Lucía, Zumpango, Estado de México
- Key people: Sergio Montaño Méndez (General Director)
- Website: www.mexicana.gob.mx

Mexicana de Aviación (legally Aerolínea del Estado Mexicano, S.A. de C.V.) is a Mexican domestic, state-owned airline established on 15 June 2023. It operates under the historical commercial name Mexicana de Aviación, after the government acquired the former airline's brands and assets on 9 August 2023.

The airline is managed by the Secretariat of National Defense and its headquarters is at Felipe Ángeles International Airport.

== History ==
On 18 May 2023, the Official Journal of the Federation listed the creation of the company Aerolínea del Estado Mexicano, S.A. de C.V, that will "promote, operate and provide the public service of national and international regular air transport of passengers, cargo, mail or a combination of these, on its own account or through public or private persons."

In August 2023, deals were finalized by the Mexican government, which introduced the airline during a press conference. After briefly launching ticket pre-sales in September, the airline planned to begin operations in December 2023.

In October 2023, the airline was granted an Assignment Title by the Federal Civil Aviation Agency.

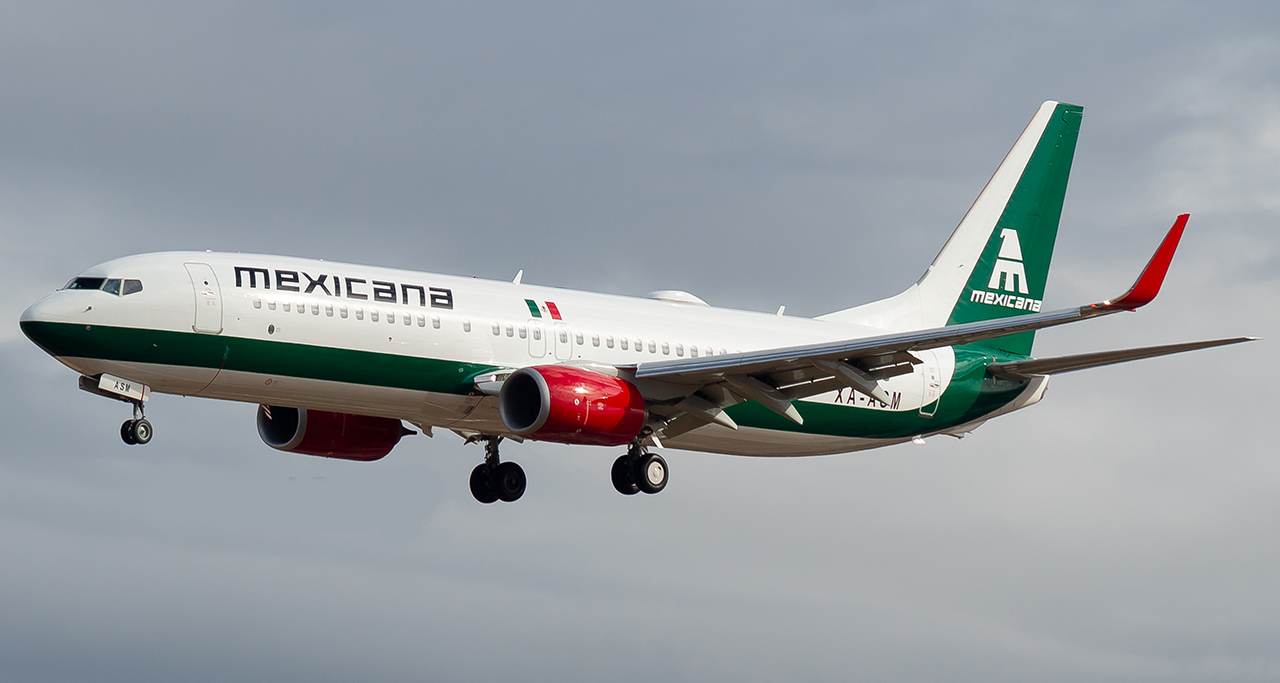
Mexicana de Aviación Boeing 737-800

The first aircraft was delivered on 17 December 2023, registered as "XA-ASM". It made its maiden test flight from Santa Lucia to Tijuana.

The inaugural flight was on 26 December 2023 from Felipe Ángeles International Airport to Tulum International Airport, though the flight briefly diverted to Mérida due to weather before finally landing in Tulum.

In January 2025, Mexicana ended services to seven destinations, beginning a restructuring process.

== Operations ==
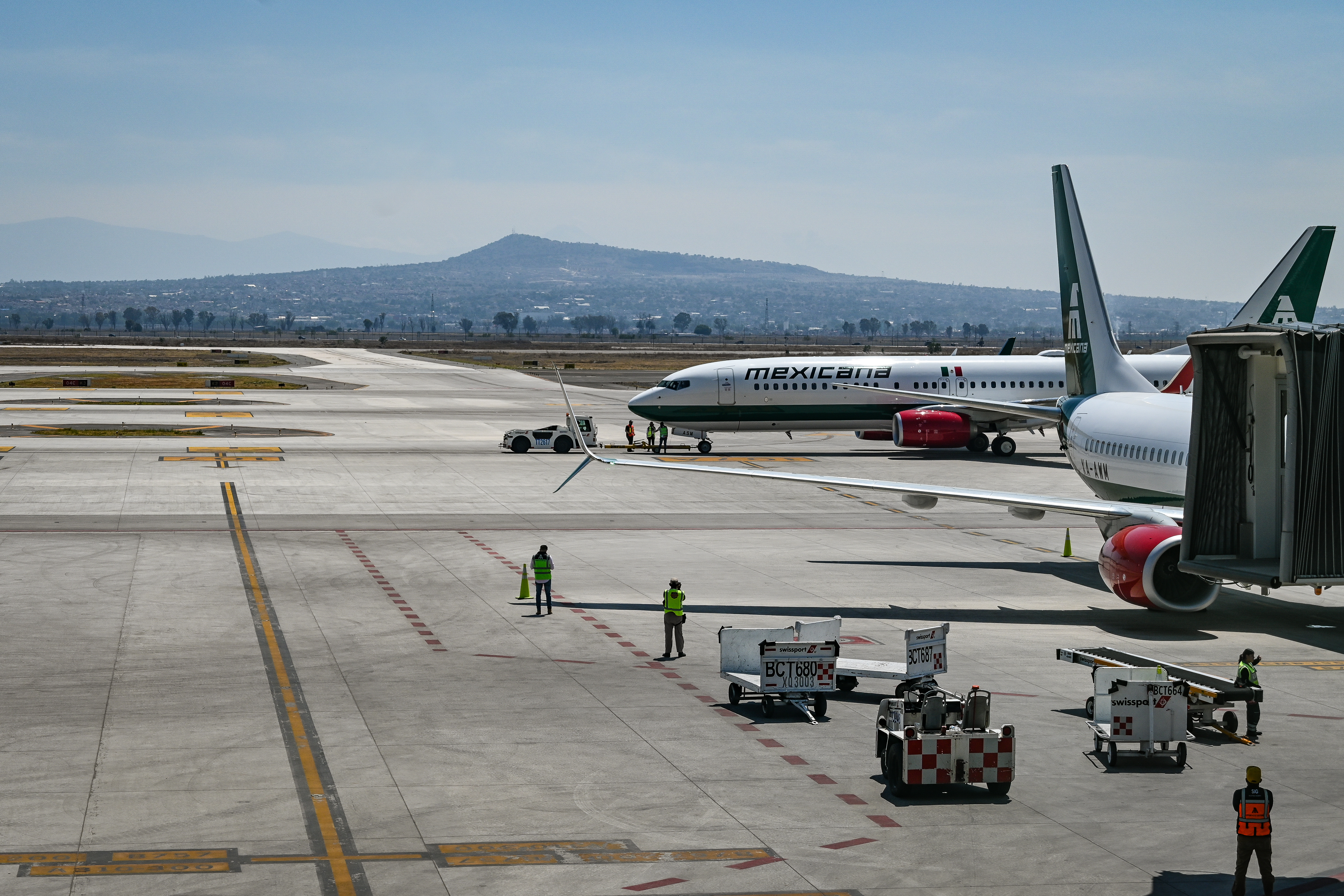
Two Boeing 737-800s taxiing at Felipe Ángeles International Airport.

The airline intended to start operations on 1 December 2023, with a planned fleet of 10 Boeing 737-800 aircraft. However, it did not receive a valid air operator's certificate at the time and delivery was postponed. The airline used an Embraer 145 aircraft for certification, wet leased from TAR Aerolíneas, and was registered as "XA-VGQ". The airline initially reduced its destination count from 20 to 9. The fleet was planned to consist of two Boeing 737-800 and one 737-300, all inherited from the Mexican Air Force.

In March 2024, the airline announced plans to purchase 10 Embraer aircraft after Boeing's deal fell through, and deliveries were expected after 2025. It was suggested that they would operate the Embraer E175 and Embraer E195-E2 planes. In June 2024, it was confirmed that Mexicana has ordered 20 Embraer E2 aircraft, consisting of 10 E190-E2 and 10 E195-E2 jets.

Select flights were operated up to 2024 in partnership with TAR, using two of its 50-seated Embraer 145 planes. By the end of 2024, only one leased aircraft from TAR remained operational for three destinations, as part of Mexicana's change of operations. The partnership was terminated in January 2025, resulting in the cancelation of several routes. Service to Campeche, Ixtapa–Zihuatanejo and Los Cabos was resumed by the end of 2025.

In April 2026, Mexicana announced new services to Chihuahua, Hermosillo, León/Bajío and Tuxtla Gutiérrez from Mexico City–Felipe Ángeles airport in the second half of the year.

== Lawsuit ==
In March 2024, the airline was sued by Texas-based SAT Aero Holdings, seeking up to $841 million in damages due to issues such as failing to pay $5.5 million for aircraft leasing, contract breaching, and failure to obtain licenses for importing aircraft. SAT was recruited to provide services to the airline. A complaint was filed in Manhattan, and the Mexican military defense did not have any information regarding the case.

== Destinations ==
As of November 2026, Mexicana de Aviación flies to a total of 20 domestic destinations.

City	Airport	Notes	Refs
Acapulco	Acapulco International Airport		
Campeche	Campeche International Airport		
Chetumal	Chetumal International Airport		
Chihuahua	Chihuahua International Airport		
Ciudad Victoria	Ciudad Victoria International Airport		
Guadalajara	Guadalajara International Airport		
Hermosillo	Hermosillo International Airport		
Ixtapa/Zihuatanejo	Ixtapa-Zihuatanejo International Airport		
Ixtepec	Ixtepec Airport		
León/Bajío	Bajío International Airport		
Mazatlán	Mazatlán International Airport		
Mérida	Mérida International Airport		
Mexico City	Felipe Ángeles International Airport	Hub	
Monterrey	Monterrey International Airport		
Nuevo Laredo	Nuevo Laredo International Airport	Terminated	
Palenque	Palenque International Airport		
Puerto Vallarta	Licenciado Gustavo Díaz Ordaz International Airport		
San José del Cabo	Los Cabos International Airport		
Tijuana	Tijuana International Airport		
Tulum	Tulum International Airport		
Tuxtla Gutiérrez	Tuxtla Gutiérrez International Airport		
Uruapan	Uruapan International Airport	Terminated	
Villahermosa	Villahermosa International Airport	Terminated	
Zacatecas	Zacatecas International Airport		

== Fleet ==
As of October 2026, Mexicana de Aviación operates the following aircraft:

Mexicana fleet
Aircraft	In service	Orders	Passengers	Notes
Embraer E190-E2	5	5	108	Deliveries began Q2 2025.
Embraer E195-E2	5	5	132	Deliveries began Q2 2025.
Total	10	10		

=== Historic Fleet ===
Aircraft	Number	Year entered	Year exited	Notes	ref
Boeing 737-800	3	2023	2025		

== See also ==
- Mexicana de Aviación (1921–2010)
- List of active airlines of Mexico
- Felipe Ángeles International Airport
- Transportation in Mexico
- Transport in Mexico City
