= Kauã =

Kauã may refer to:

- Kauã (footballer, born 2003), a Brazilian football midfielder for São Bernardo
- Kauã Santos (born 2003), a Brazilian football goalkeeper for Eintracht Frankfurt
- Kauã Oliveira (born 2003), Brazilian football midfielder for Sporting B
- Kauã Elias (born 2006), a Brazilian football forward for Shakhtar Donetsk
