= Campeche International Airport =

Airport in Campeche, Campeche, Mexico

Campeche International Airport Aeropuerto Internacional de Campeche
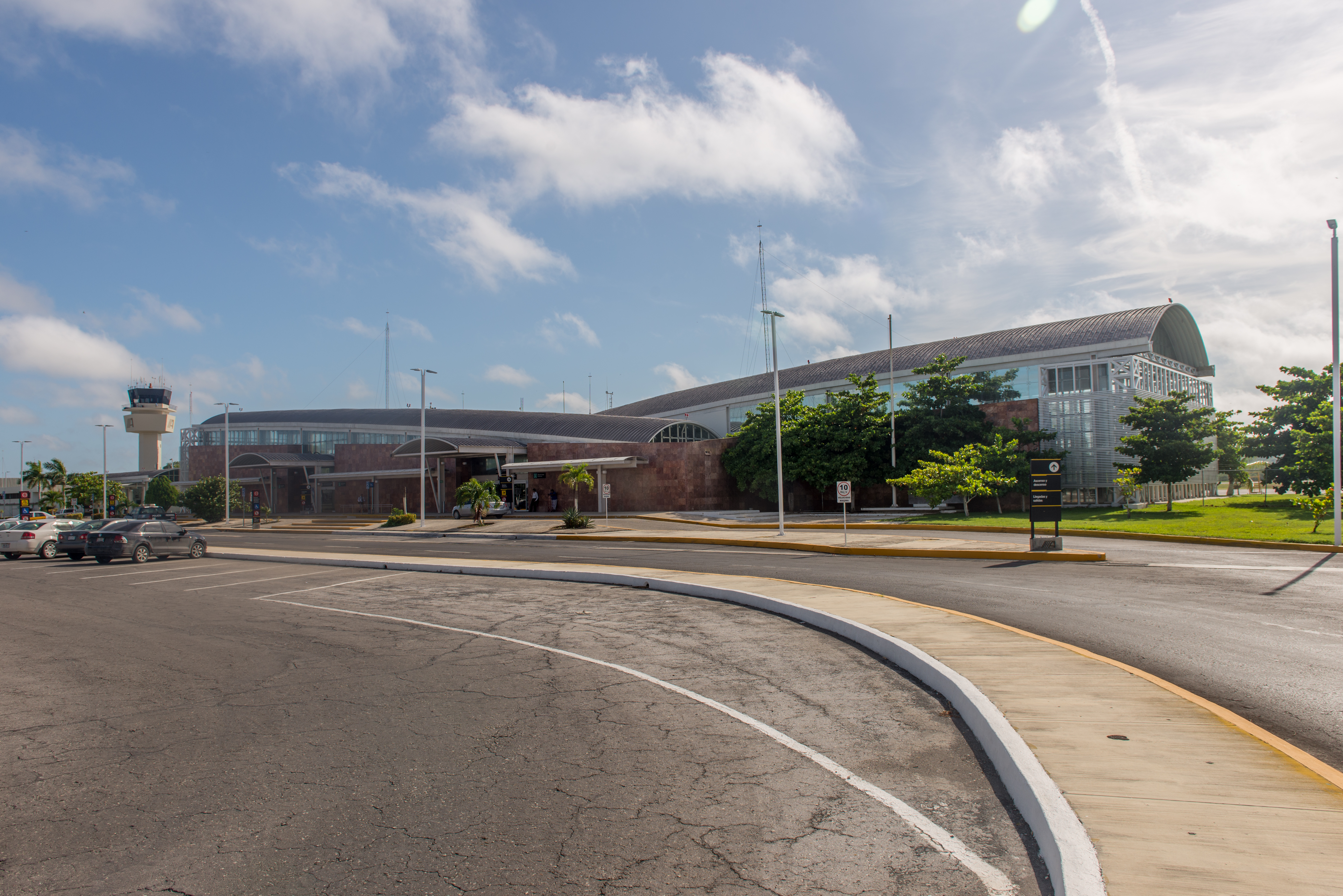
- IATA: CPE; ICAO: MMCP

Summary
- Airport type: Public
- Operator: Grupo Olmeca-Maya-Mexica
- Serves: Campeche, Campeche, Mexico
- Time zone: CST (UTC-06:00)
- Elevation AMSL: 10 m (33 ft)
- Coordinates: 19°49′00″N 090°30′01″W
- Website: www.grupomundomaya.com/CPE

Maps
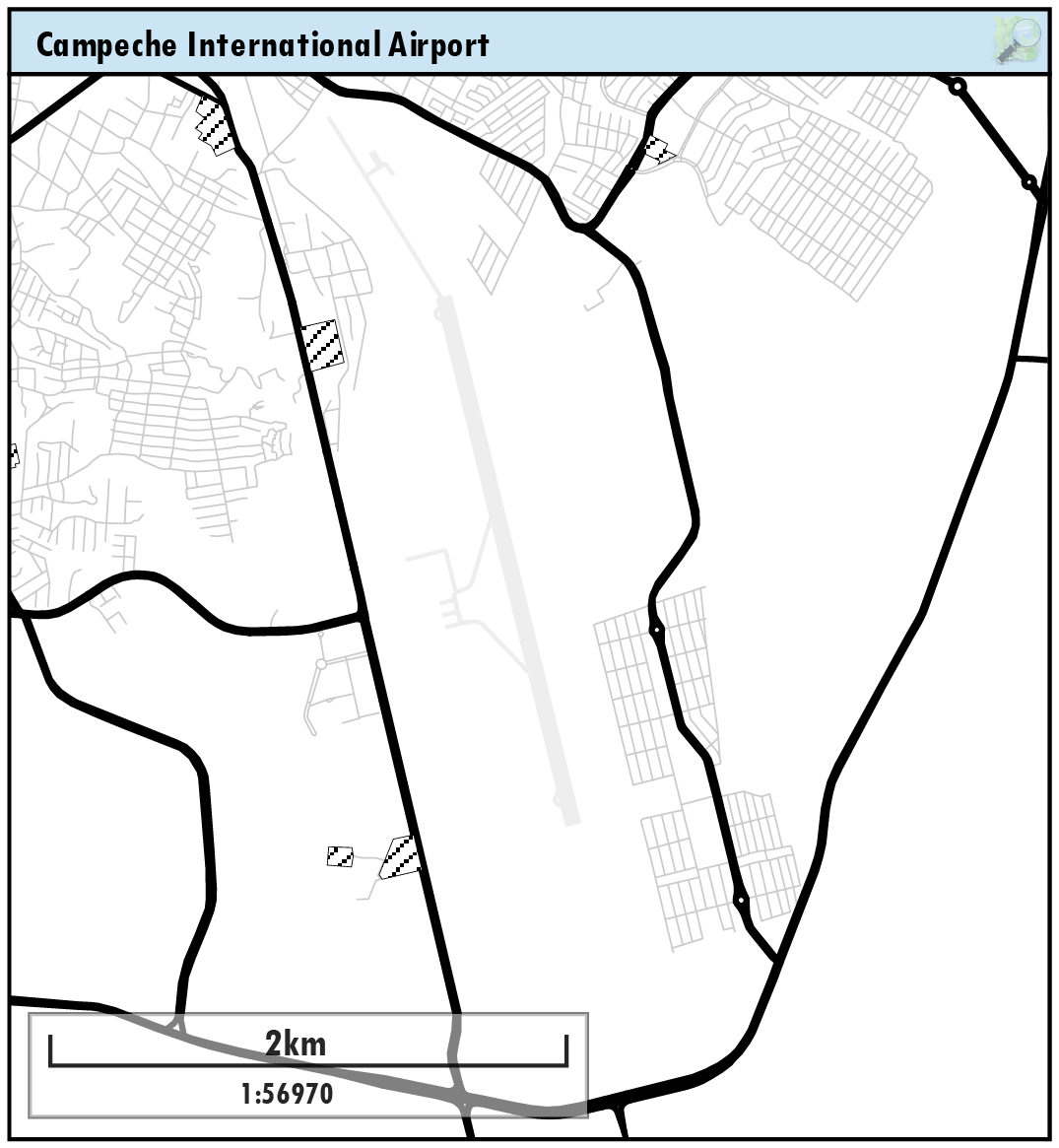
- Airport map

- Location of airport in Campeche CPE (Mexico)

Runways
Direction	Length		Surface
Direction	m	ft	Surface
16/34	2,500	8,202	Asphalt

Statistics (2025)
- Total passengers: 127,492
- Ranking in Mexico: 51th
- Source: Agencia Federal de Aviación Civil

Campeche International Airport (Spanish: Aeropuerto Internacional de Campeche), officially Aeropuerto Internacional Ing. Alberto Acuña Ongay (Ing. Alberto Acuña Ongay International Airport) (IATA: CPE, ICAO: MMCP), is an international airport located in Campeche, Campeche, Mexico. It serves domestic flights for the city of Campeche and supports various executive and general aviation activities. Since 2023, the airport has been operated by Grupo Olmeca-Maya-Mexica (GAFSACOMM), a holding company owned by the Mexican military. It handled 127,492 passengers in 2025 and 133,377 in 2024.

== Facilities ==
The airport is situated at an elevation of 10 metres (33 ft) above mean sea level, covering an area of 400 hectares (990 acres). It features a single asphalt runway, designated as 05/23, measuring 2,500 metres (8,200 ft). The commercial aviation apron spans 16,200 square metres (174,000 sq ft), featuring three parking positions for narrow-body aircraft and additional stands for general aviation. Official operating hours are from 7:00 to 19:00.

The passenger terminal caters to both domestic arrivals and departures in a single-story structure. It includes check-in areas, a security checkpoint, a baggage claim area, and an arrivals hall with car rental services, taxi stands, and several retail stores. The departures concourse includes two gates with direct access to the apron, allowing passengers to board their planes by walking to the aircraft. Adjacent facilities include parking areas, civil aviation hangars, administration offices, courier and logistic facilities, and facilities for general aviation.

Campeche Airport also houses the Campeche Naval Air Base (Spanish: Base Aeronaval de Campeche) at the northern end of the airport grounds. The base hosts the following units:

- 5th Air Mobility, Observation and Transport Naval Air Squadron – operating Mi-8
- 1st Interception and Reconnaissance Naval Air Squadron – operating L-90TP, Sabre 60

== Airlines and destinations ==
=== Passenger ===
Airlines	Destinations
Aeroméxico Connect	Mexico City–Benito Juárez
Mexicana de Aviación	Mexico City–Felipe Ángeles

== Statistics ==
=== Annual Traffic ===
Passenger statistics at Campeche Airport
Year	Total Passengers	change %	Cargo movements (t)	Air operations
2006	76,734	Steady	11	4,647
2007	89,866	▲17.11%	30	5,521
2008	99,549	▲10.77%	6	5,495
2009	89,680	▼9.91%	1	5,171
2010	103,514	▲15.42%	-	5,315
2011	113,169	▲9.32%	-	5,157
2012	148,447	▲31.17%	-	5,132
2013	166,271	▲12.00%	56	4,932
2014	190,535	▲14.59%	6	5,731
2015	181,751	▼4.61%	107	5,784
2016	183,369	▲0.89%	162	5,340
2017	178,675	▼2.55%	155	4,809
2018	165,185	▼7.55%	204	4,740
2019	164,919	▼0.16%	277	4,768
2020	75,061	▼54.49%	174	3,633
2021	134,601	▲79.32%	240	4,436
2022	144,013	▲6.99%	323	3,333
2023	107,892	▼25.08%	339	3,715
2024	133,377	▲23.62%	395	3,675
2025	127,492	▼4.41%	381	4,403

== See also ==
- List of the busiest airports in Mexico
- List of airports in Mexico
- List of airports by ICAO code: M
- List of busiest airports in North America
- List of the busiest airports in Latin America
- Transportation in Mexico
- Tourism in Mexico
