= Xuxcab =

Human settlement in Yucatán state, México

Coordinates: 20°27′00″N 088°28′00″W

Xuxcab is a populated place in Yucatán, Mexico.

== See also ==
- Yaxuna
