= Kaua Municipality =

Municipality in the Mexican state of Yucatán

Kaua
- Municipality
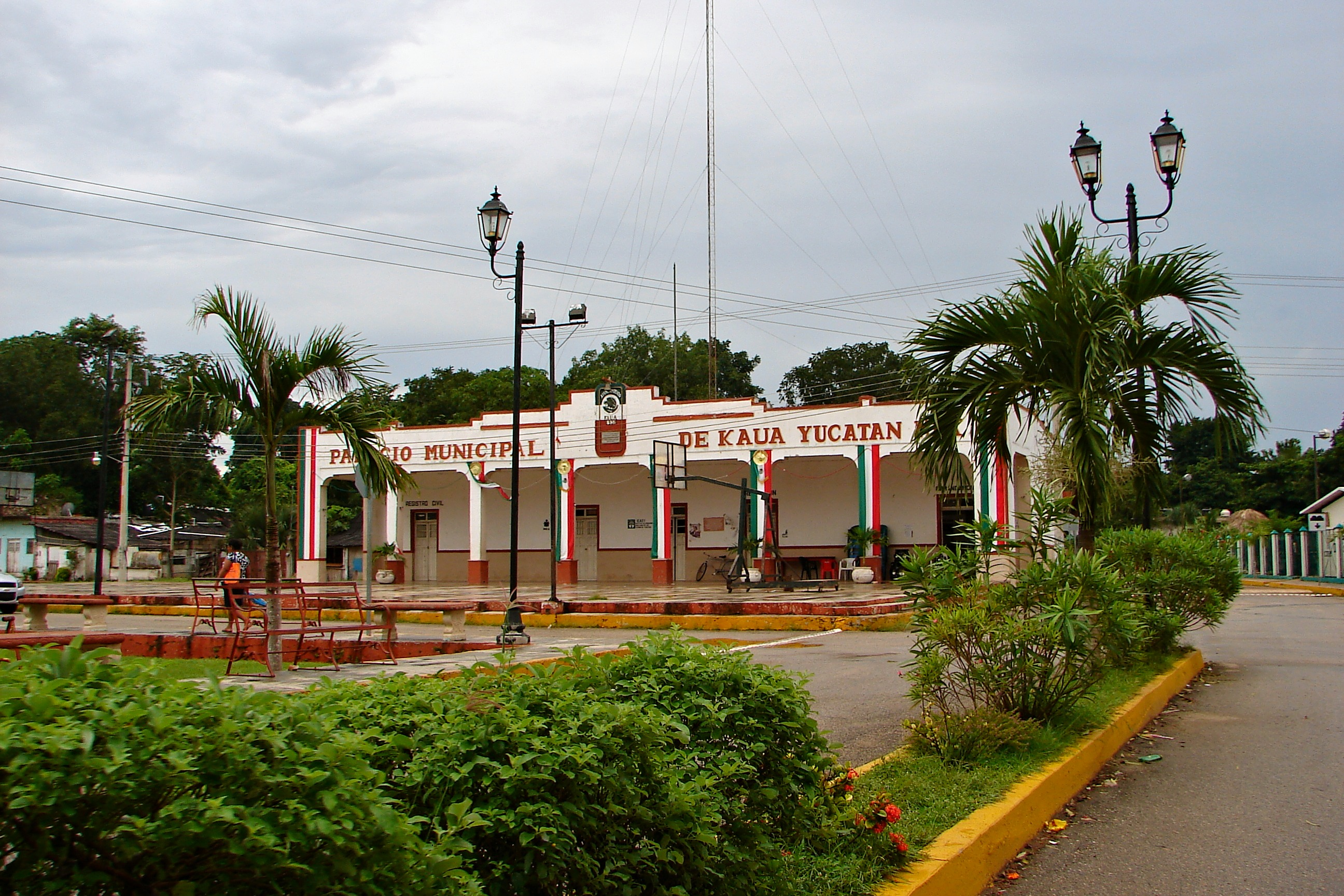
- Municipal Hall of Kaua

- Region 6 Oriente #043

- Location of the Municipality in Mexico
- Coordinates: 20°37′09″N 88°24′56″W
- Country: Mexico
- State: Yucatán
- Mexico Ind.: 1821
- Yucatán Est.: 1824

Government
  - Type: 2012–2015
  - Municipal President: Edgar René Perera Caamal

Area
  - Total: 214.60 km^{2} (82.86 sq mi)
- Elevation: 26 m (85 ft)

Population (2010)
  - Total: 2,761
  - Density: 12.87/km^{2} (33.32/sq mi)
  - Demonym: Umanense
- Time zone: UTC-6 (Central Standard Time)
- INEGI Code: 043
- Major Airport: Merida (Manuel Crescencio Rejón) International Airport
- IATA Code: MID
- ICAO Code: MMMD

Kaua Municipality (Yucatec Maya: "is it bitter?") is a municipality in the Mexican state of Yucatán containing 214.60 km^{2} of land and is located roughly 135 kilometres (84 mi) southeast of the city of Mérida.

== History ==
There is no accurate data on when the town was founded, but it was a settlement before the conquest. After colonization, the area became part of the encomienda system with various encomenderos, beginning in 1544 with Juan de la Cruz, passing in 1607 to Juan Gil de la Cruz and Tomé Gil de la Cruz, to Ignacio de Escalante Barroto in 1663 and to Diego Escalante from 1700 to 1750.

Yucatán declared its independence from the Spanish Crown in 1821 and in 1825 the area was assigned to the Valladolid Municipality. In 1928 the area became its own municipality.

== Governance ==
The municipal president is elected for a three-year term. The town council has four councilpersons, who serve as Secretary and councilors of sports, ecology and education.

The Municipal Council administers the business of the municipality. It is responsible for budgeting and expenditures and producing all required reports for all branches of the municipal administration. Annually it determines educational standards for schools.

The Police Commissioners ensure public order and safety. They are tasked with enforcing regulations, distributing materials and administering rulings of general compliance issued by the council.

== Communities ==
The head of the municipality is Kaua, Yucatán. The municipality has 12 populated places besides the seat including Chan Dzonot, Dzeal, Dzibiac, Haimil, Kankab, Knoh, San Nicolás, San Román, Tzcal, Xkoben, X'lapxul and Xuxcab. The significant populations are shown below:

Community	Population
Entire Municipality (2010)	2,761
Dzeal	256 in 2005
Kaua	2157 in 2005

== Local festivals ==
Every year on 8 December the town celebrates the feast of Virgin of the Conception.

== Tourist attractions ==
- Church of the Immaculate Conception, built during the seventeenth century
- archeological sites at Kaua with crypts
- Cenote Chuicabdzonot
- Cenote Yaax Ek
