= Kauã (footballer, born 2003) =

Brazilian footballer

Personal information
- Full name: Kauã Jesus Tenório
- Date of birth: 2 September 2003 (age 23)
- Place of birth: São Paulo, Brazil
- Height: 1.70 m (5 ft 7 in)
- Position: Midfielder

Team information
- Current team: São Bernardo

Youth career
- 2019–2022: Oeste

Senior career*
Years	Team	Apps	(Gls)
2019–2022	Oeste	83	(7)
2023–	São Bernardo	10	(0)
- * Club domestic league appearances and goals as of 30 September 2023

Kauã Jesus Tenório (born 2 September 2003), commonly known as Kauã, is a Brazilian footballer who plays as a midfielder for São Bernardo.

== Career statistics ==
=== Club ===
As of 9 September 2020.

Club	Season	League			State League		Cup		Continental		Other		Total	
Club	Season	Division	Apps	Goals	Apps	Goals	Apps	Goals	Apps	Goals	Apps	Goals	Apps	Goals
Oeste	2019	Série B	1	0	0	0	0	0	–		0	0	1	0
Oeste	2020	Série B	7	0	0	0	0	0	–		0	0	8	0
Career total			8	0	0	0	0	0	0	0	0	0	8	0
