= Transportation in Mexico =

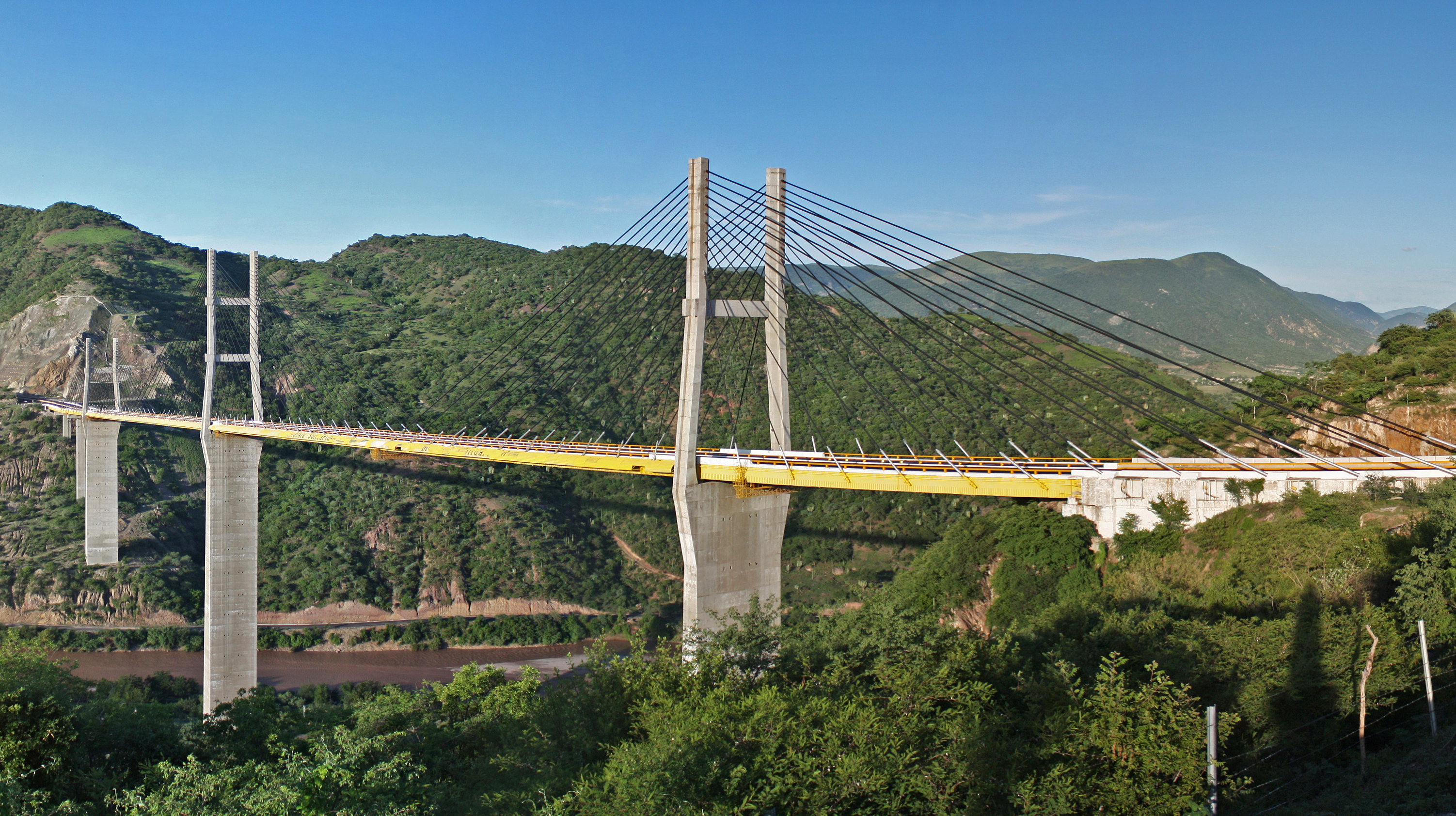
Mezcala Bridge on Highway 95 in Mexico.

As the third largest and second most populous country in Latin America, Mexico has developed an extensive transportation network. Regulated by the Secretariat of Communications and Transportation (Secretaría de Comunicaciones y Transportes, SCT), a federal executive cabinet branch, the system includes modern highways, a well-connected bus network, railways primarily used for freight, and a network of domestic and international airports.

These infrastructures facilitate trade, tourism, and domestic travel, connecting México's diverse regions. However, challenges such as maintenance, traffic congestion, and safety concerns persist, particularly in urban centers, highlighting ongoing efforts to improve and expand the country's transportation capabilities.

== Roadways ==
Highway network
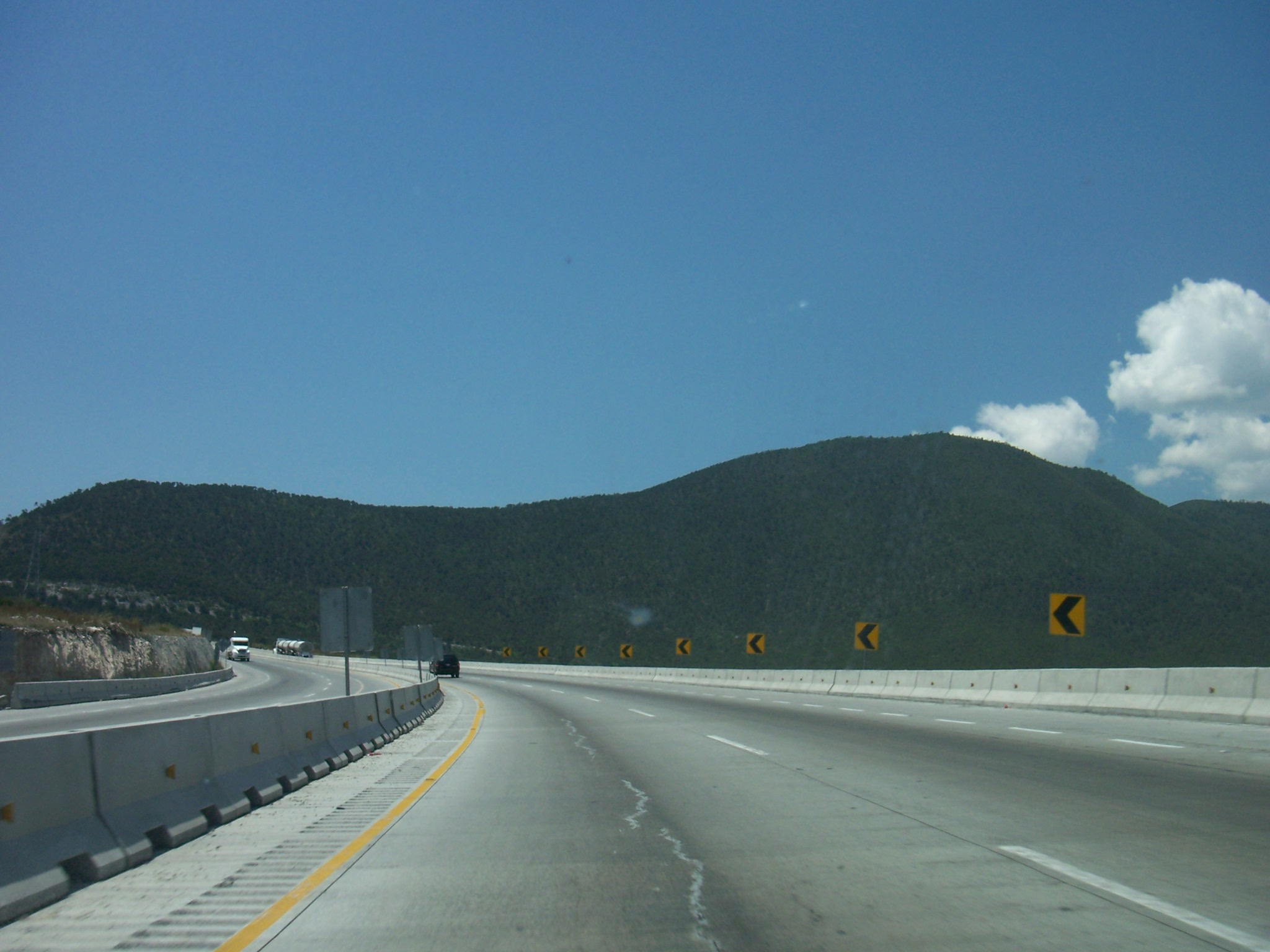
- M57-D Expressway joining Saltillo and Mexico City
- Total extension: 332,031 km
- Paved highways: 116,802 km
- Multi-lane expressways: 10,474 km

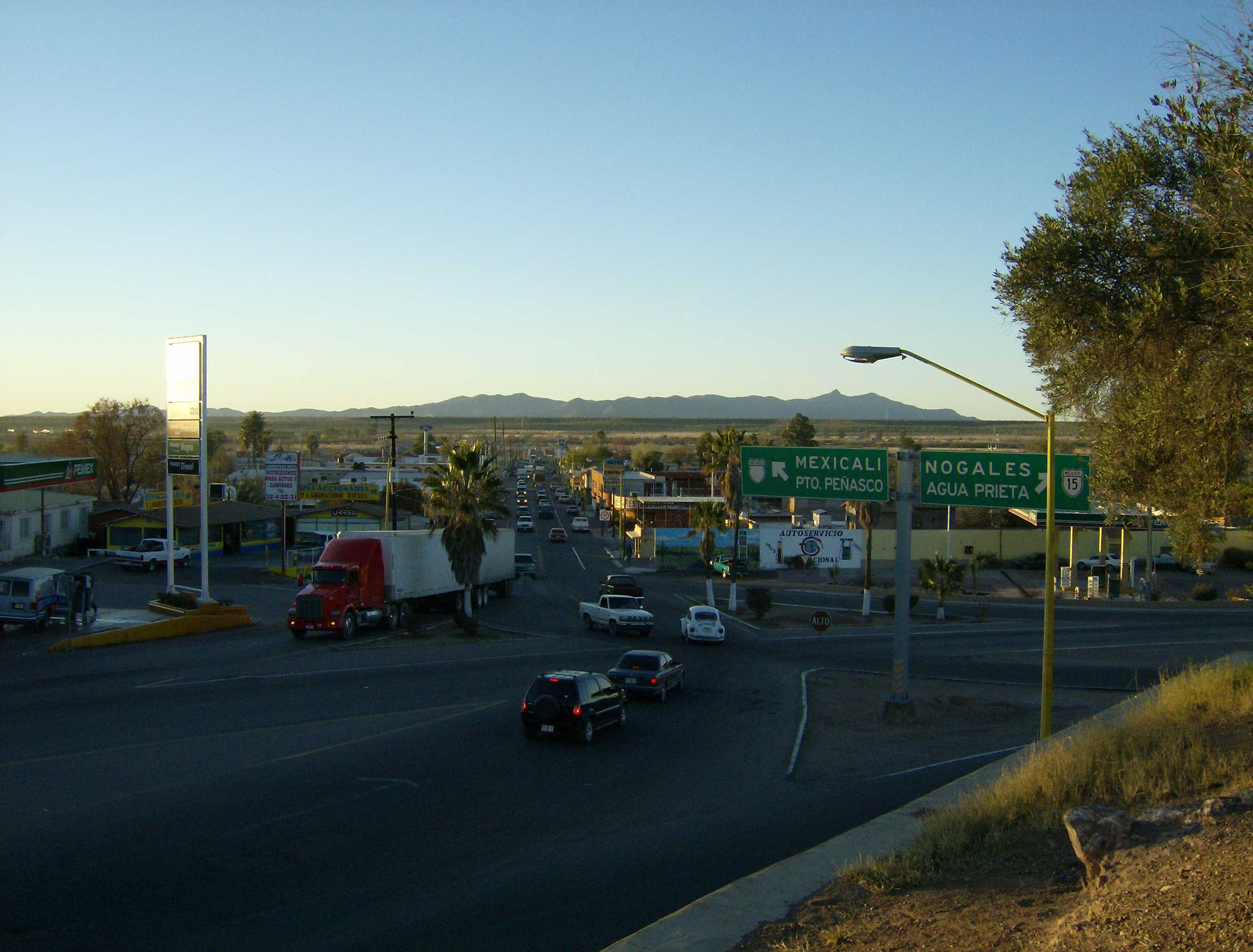
Llave del Desierto (desert key), Santa Ana, Sonora, México.

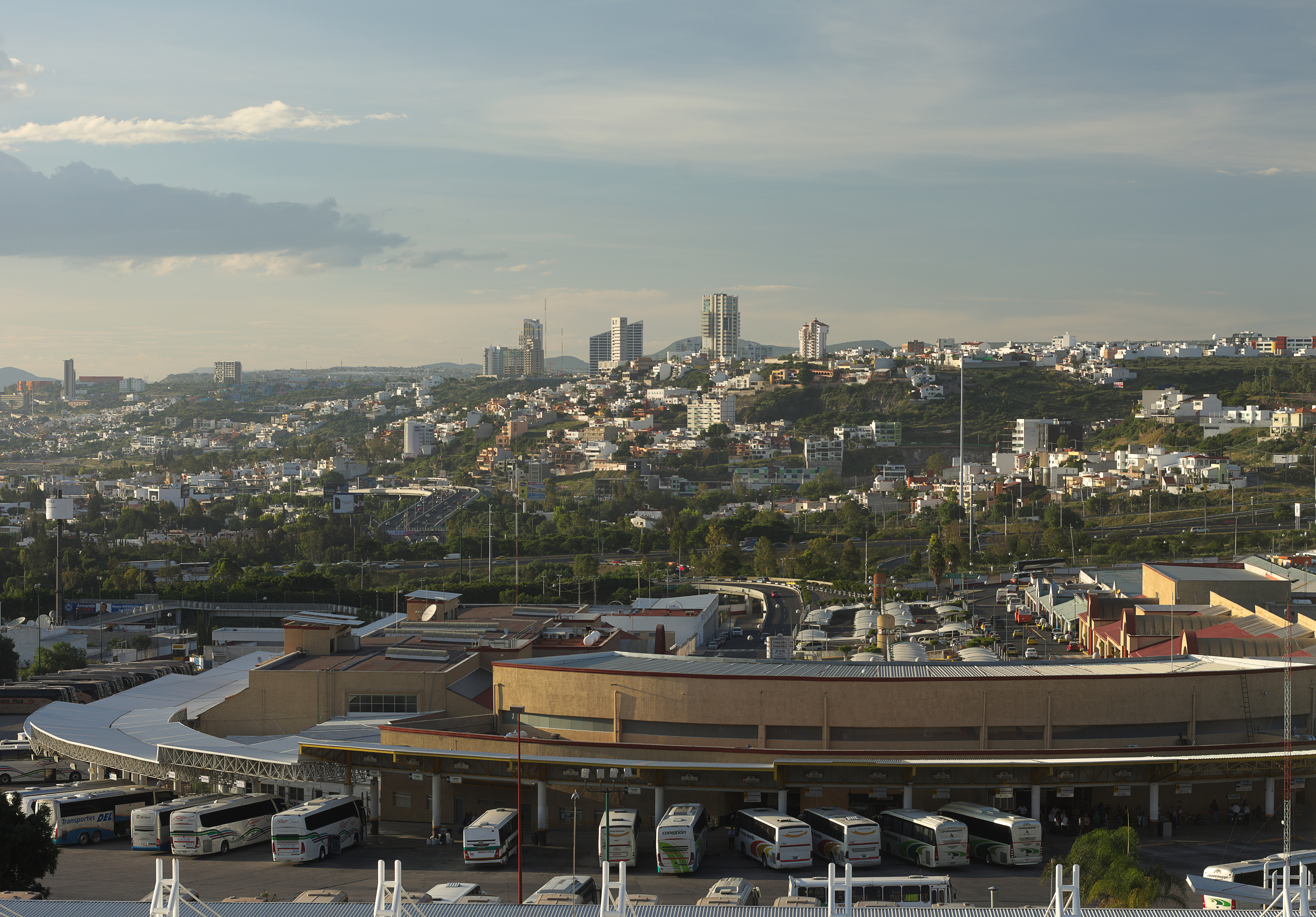
Querétaro Bus Terminal.

The roadway network in Mexico is extensive and covers all areas of the country. The roadway network in Mexico has an extent of 366,095 km (227,481 mi), of which 116,802 km (72,577 mi) are paved, making it the largest paved-roadway network in Latin America. Of these, 10,474 km (6,508 mi) are multi-lane expressways: 9,544 km (5,930 mi) are four-lane highways and the rest have six or more lanes.

The highway network in Mexico is classified by number of lanes and type of access. The great majority of the network is composed of undivided or divided two-lane highways, with or without shoulders, and are known simply as carreteras. Four or more-lane freeways or expressways, with restricted or unrestricted access, are known as autopistas. Speed limits on two-lane highways can vary depending on terrain conditions. The speed limit on multi-lane freeways or expressways is on average 110 km/h (70 mph) for automobiles and 95 km/h (60 mph) for buses and trucks.

The expressways are for the most part toll roads or autopistas de cuota. Non-toll roads are referred to as carreteras libres (free-roads). Most toll expressways have emergency telephone booths, water wells, and emergency braking ramps at short intervals. The toll usually includes a "travelers' insurance" (seguro del viajero) for any accident occurring within the freeway. The toll expressways are on average among the most expensive in the world according to a comparative study realized in 2004 by the Chamber of Deputies. The most traveled freeways are those that link the three most populous cities in Mexico— Mexico City, Guadalajara, and Monterrey in the form of a triangle.

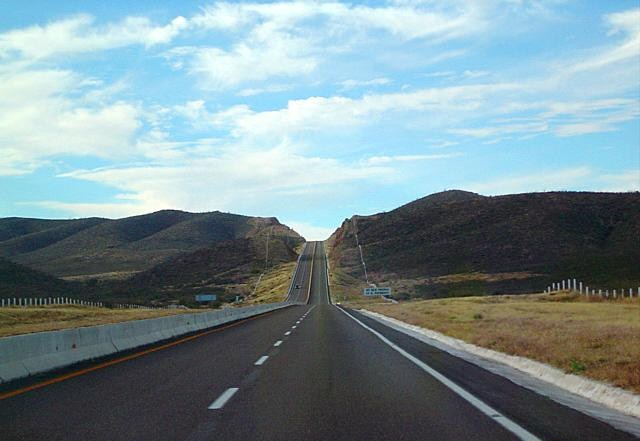
The Federal Highway México-49, which works as part of the Pan-American Highway, Torreón, Coahuila.

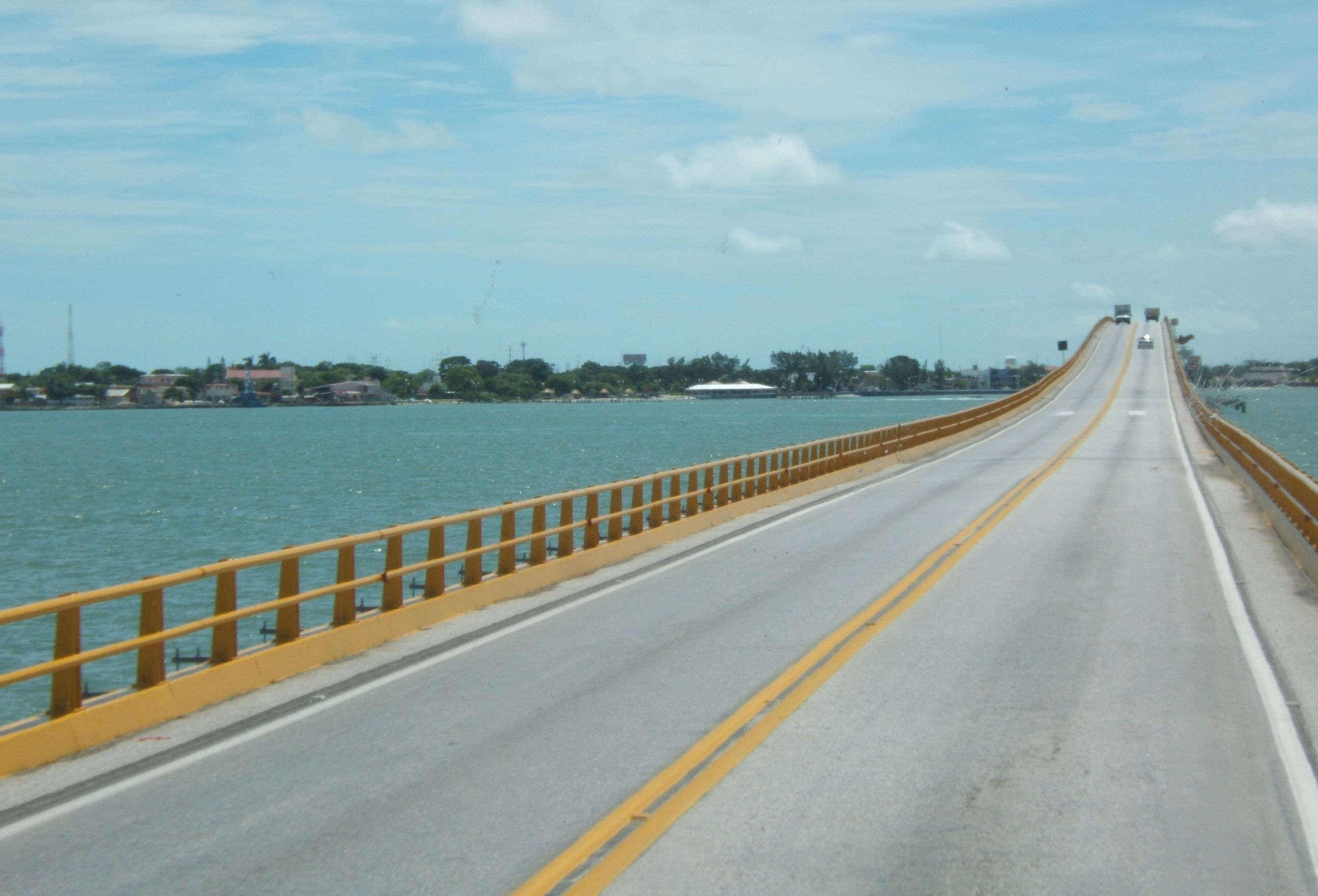
Zacatal Bridge, the longest bridge in the state and at the time of opening the longest in Mexico.

No federal freeway or expressway crosses a city; toll expressways are either turned into toll bypasses (libramientos), often used as toll or free ring roads (periféricos), or are turned into major arterial roads even if they function as freeways with restricted access.

Mexican highways are assigned a one to three-digit number. North-south highways are assigned odd numbers whereas east-west highways are assigned even numbers. Toll expressways usually run parallel to a free road and so are assigned the same number with the letter "D" added. (For example, the undivided two-lane highway connecting Mexico City and Puebla is MX 150, and the six-lane toll expressway is MX 150D).

Mexico has had difficulty in building an integrated highway network because of the country's orography and landscape characteristics—most of the country is crossed by high-altitude ranges of mountains. Over the last two decades, Mexico has made impressive investments in order to improve its road infrastructure and connect main cities and towns across the country. In spite of its extension and recent development, the roadway network in Mexico is still inadequate to meet the current needs of the population and except for the toll roads, and they are often inadequately maintained.

An additional problem is that in the center of the country the roads run into Metropolitan Mexico City from regional centers, but there are few roads that run peripherally to connect the other regional centers without running through the congestion around the capital. The federal government, in partnership with the government of Mexico State and the Federal District, has tried to alleviate that problem by constructing a tolled Mexico City bypass highway, Arco Norte, which was partially opened in 2009.

== Railroads ==
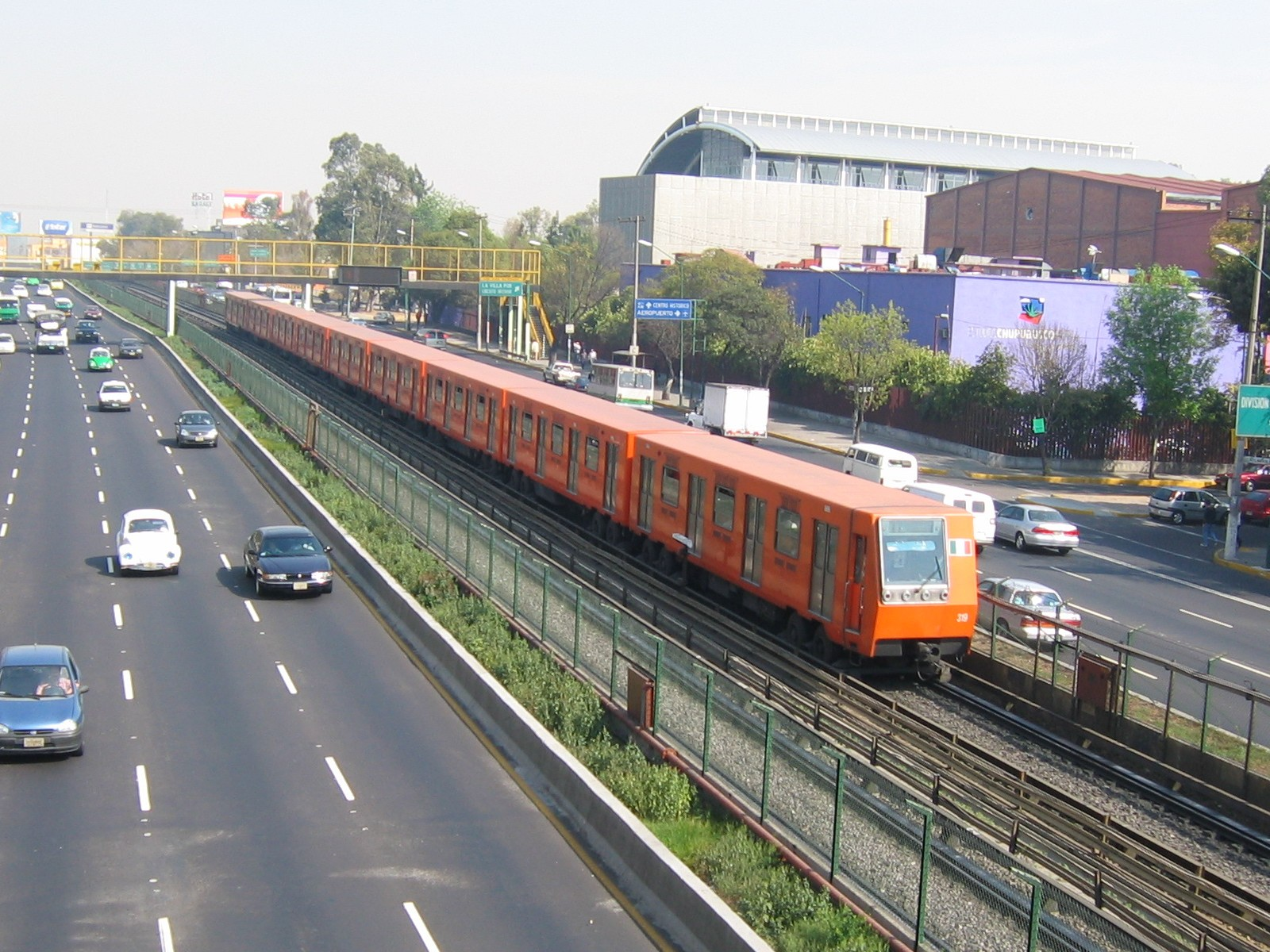
Metro train in Mexico City.

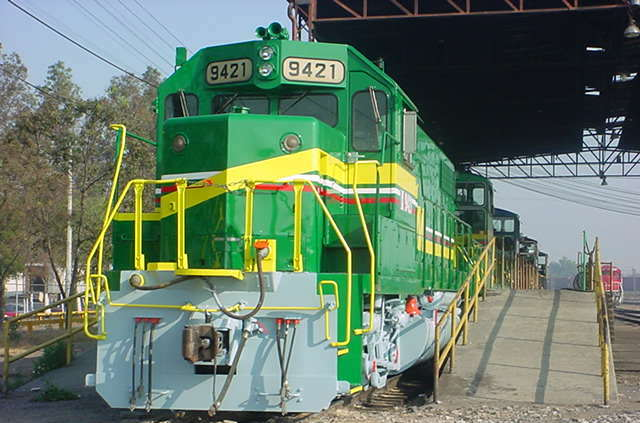
Ferrovalle locomotive in workshop.

Mexico privatized its freight rail service with the dissolution of the former Ferrocarriles Nacionales de México freight service in 1998, leading to significant improvements and modernization in the sector. Today, the country boasts a robust rail network primarily operated by companies like Ferromex and Kansas City Southern de México, which facilitate the transport of various goods across the nation. In addition to freight, Mexico also supports urban rail infrastructure, including the Mexico City Metro and the Monterrey Metro, along with light rail systems such as the Mexico City Light Rail and the Guadalajara Light Rail System. Looking towards the future, the Secretariat of Communications and Transport of Mexico has proposed ambitious projects like a high-speed rail link from Mexico City to Guadalajara, with stops in Querétaro, Guanajuato, León, and Irapuato, allowing passengers to travel at speeds of 300 km/h and reducing travel time between these cities significantly compared to road transport.

== Airports and air travel ==
Airport and air traffic
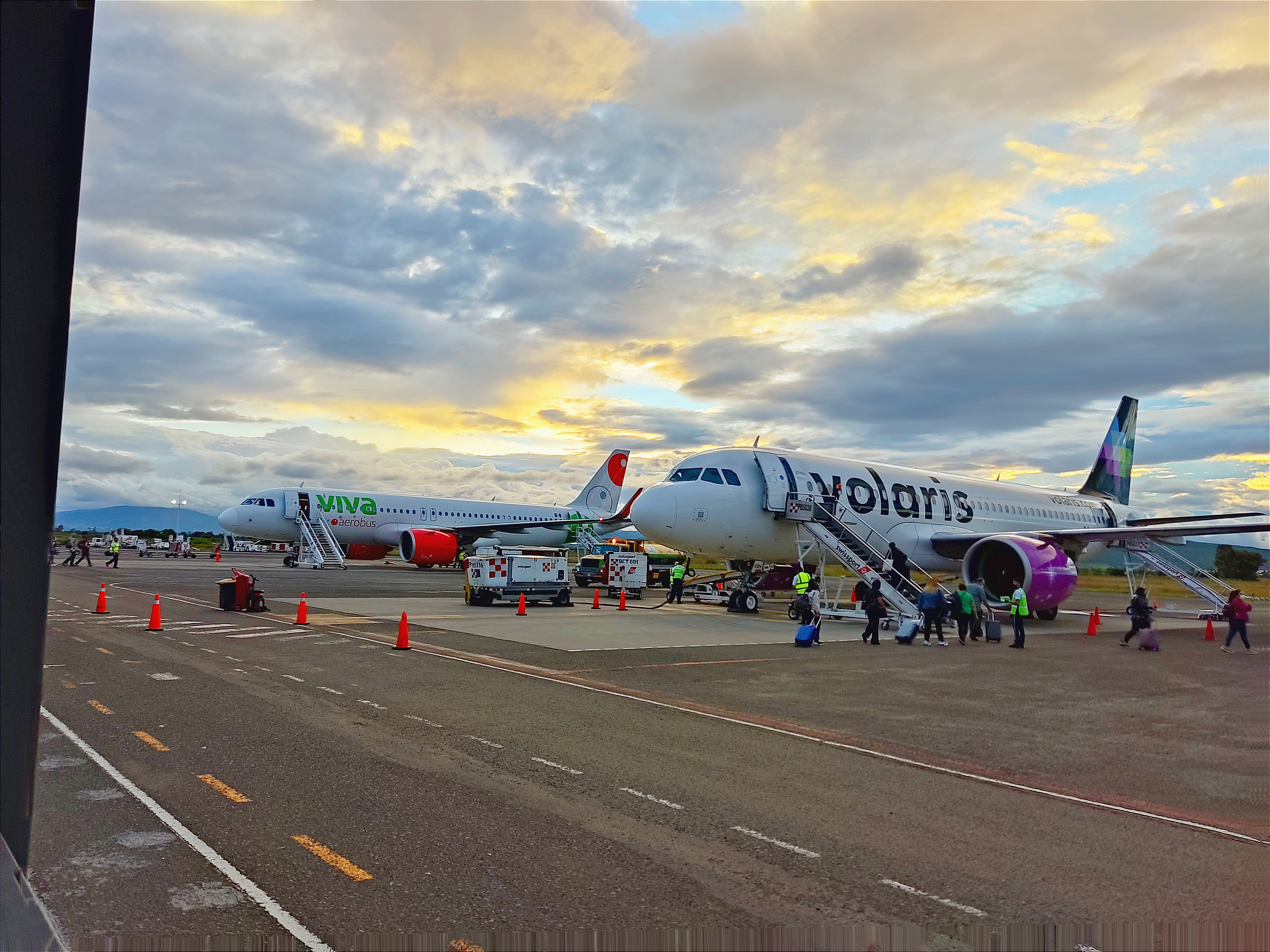
- 1,834 (2007)
- Paved runways: 231
- Largest airport: Mexico City International Airport (26 million p/year)

Air travel has played a central role in connecting Mexico’s remote regions, supporting economic development, and boosting international mobility. Given the country's vast and often rugged geography, aviation emerged early on as a practical solution for connecting remote areas, especially in the absence of reliable road infrastructure. Today, it remains essential for domestic mobility, tourism, business travel, and trade logistics, especially across regions poorly served by rail or long-distance buses.

Commercial aviation in Mexico began in 1921 with the creation of Compañía Mexicana de Transportación Aérea in Mexico City, the forerunner to Mexicana de Aviación, once the country's oldest and most prestigious airline. Throughout the 20th century, air travel expanded alongside industrial growth and urbanization, with Mexico City becoming a major regional hub. The liberalization of airspace in the 1990s, followed by waves of privatization and deregulation, reshaped the industry—paving the way for low-cost carriers and increased international competition.

The 2016 U.S.–Mexico Air Transport Agreement marked a turning point. It scrapped decades-old restrictions and gave airlines freedom to fly point-to-point between any cities in either country—no more limiting each route to two or three carriers or routing everything through major hubs. It also opened the door to fifth freedom rights and commercial alliances, giving airlines more flexibility to serve international routes via third countries.

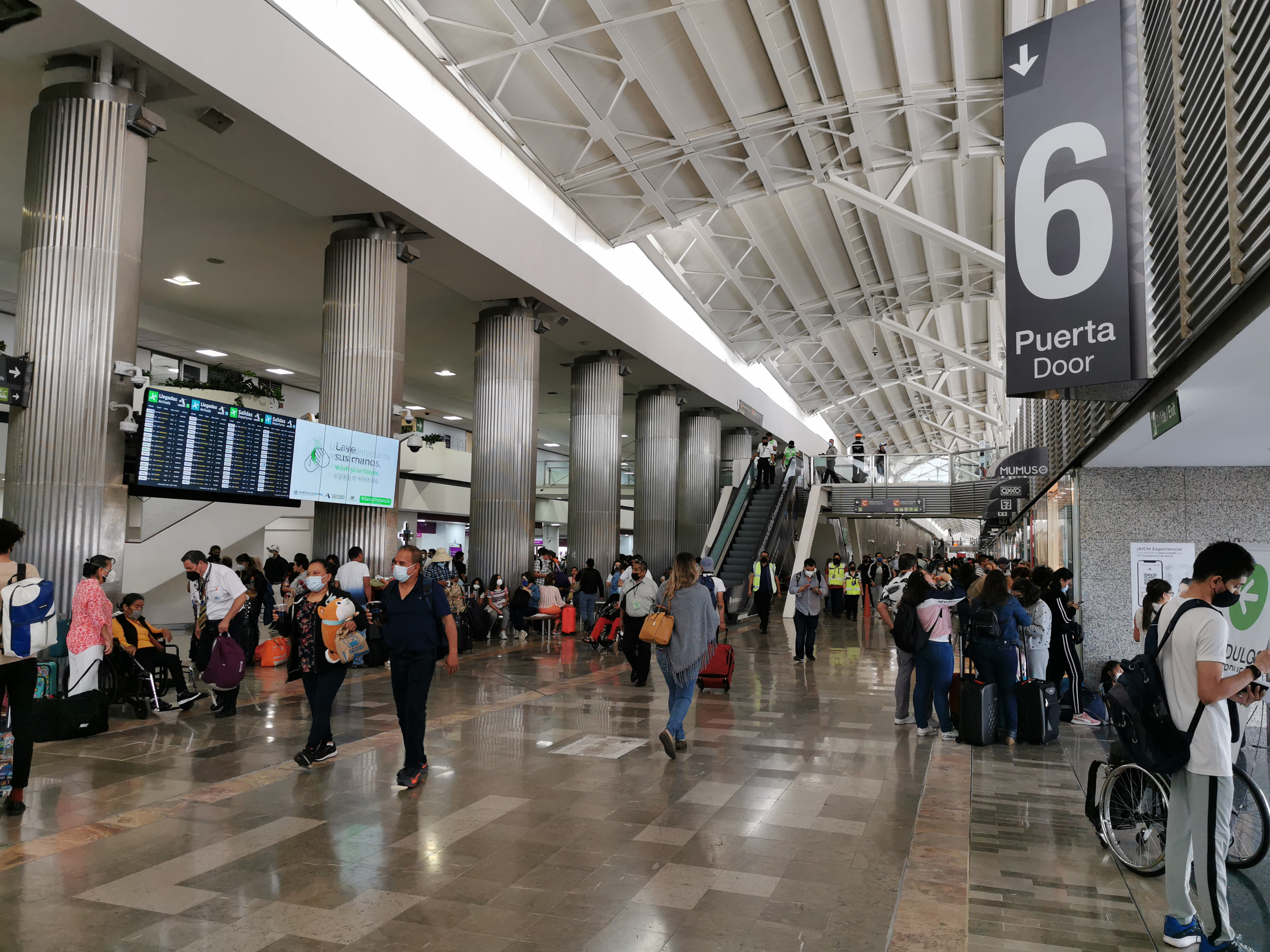
Mexico City International Airport is Mexico´s busiest airport.

=== Airports ===
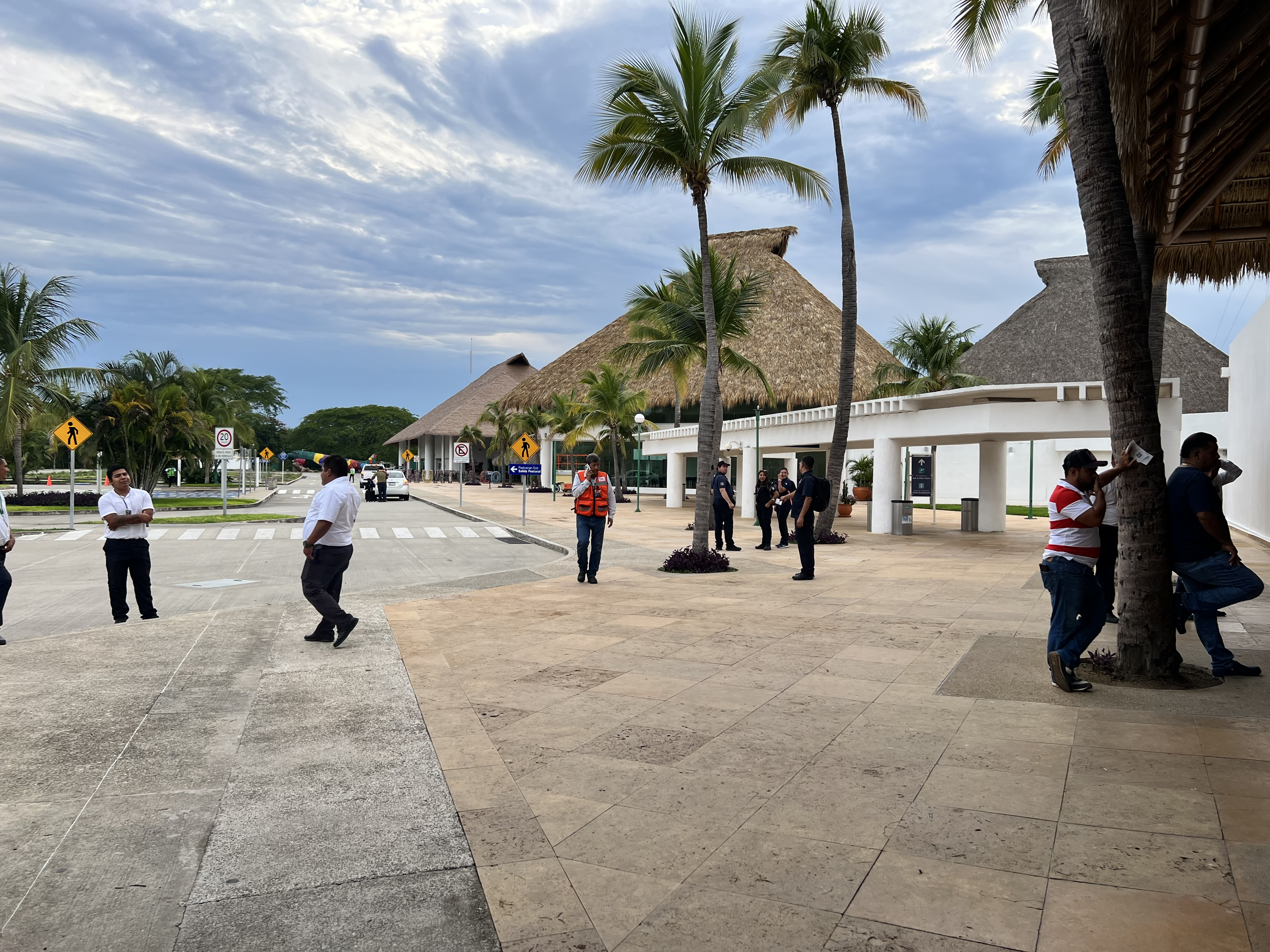
Huatulco International Airport

Mexico has a vast aviation network, with 1,527 registered airfields and 80 officially recognized airports as of 2025, ranking 4th globally after the U.S., Brazil, and Australia. A significant number of these airports offer scheduled commercial flights, including both domestic-only and international passenger services. The country also has 20 Air Force bases, 10 Air Force stations, 13 Naval Air Bases, and 5 Naval Air Stations, most of which share facilities with civil aviation rather than operating independently. Additionally, hundreds of airfields and airstrips remain scattered across the country, many dating back to a time when limited road infrastructure made air travel crucial for connecting remote areas and supporting military logistics.

Mexico’s airport system is managed by both public and private operators, with the Federal Civil Aviation Agency (AFAC) overseeing regulations and safety. In 1995, the government launched a major airport privatization effort through the 'Ley de Aeropuertos' (Airports Law), transferring most state-owned airports to private operators: Grupo Aeroportuario del Sureste (ASUR), Grupo Aeroportuario del Pacífico (GAP), and Grupo Aeroportuario del Centro Norte (OMA). In 2023, the government expanded military involvement in infrastructure, creating the military-owned Grupo Olmeca-Maya-Mexica (OMM), which took over several previously government-operated airports. A small number of airports remain under state control, managed by Aeropuertos y Servicios Auxiliares (ASA) and other public entities.

Mexico City International Airport (MEX) remains the country’s busiest airport and one of the largest in Latin America. It serves as the primary hub for Mexico's flagship carrier, Aeroméxico. The broader Mexico City Airport System, which includes Felipe Ángeles International Airport (NLU) and Toluca International Airport (TLC), is one of the busiest city airport systems in Latin America.

Cancún International Airport (CUN) is the busiest airport in Mexico and Latin America by international passenger traffic, offering flights to numerous destinations across the Americas and Europe. Felipe Ángeles International Airport (NLU) leads in cargo operations, with the most operational runways (3) and the longest runway in Mexico.

Other major airports include Guadalajara (GDL), Monterrey (MTY), Tijuana (TIJ), Los Cabos (SJD), and Puerto Vallarta (PVR). Every Mexican metropolitan area with over 300,000 inhabitants has an airport, with Saltillo (SLW), Cuernavaca (CVJ), and Xalapa (JAL) being the largest cities whose airports lack scheduled passenger service.

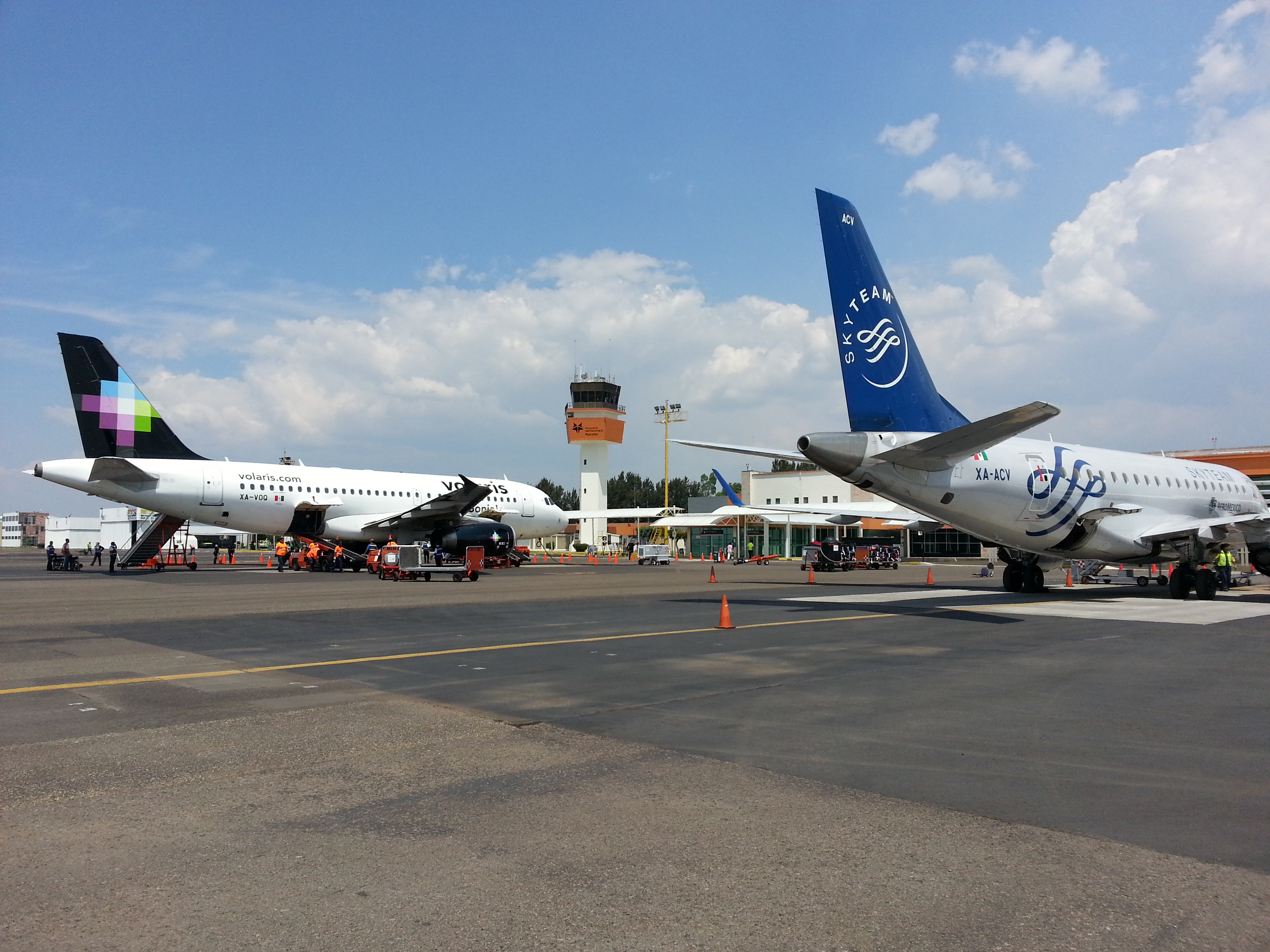
Volaris A319 and Aeromexico Connect Embraer 170 at Morelia International Airport

=== Airlines ===
Mexico’s commercial aviation sector is dominated by a handful of carriers that reflect the country’s fragmented geography, uneven development, and class-based mobility patterns.

The landscape is led by three major players: Aeroméxico, Volaris, and Viva—each catering to a different segment of the market while competing on overlapping routes both domestically and internationally. Today, Aeroméxico is the national flag carrier and the country’s largest airline by fleet size and number of destinations. Volaris leads by passengers carried, while Viva ranks third among major carriers. Other domestic and regional airlines include TAR México, Aerus, Aero Servicio Guerrero, Magnicharters, and the recently launched, state-owned Mexicana de Aviación.

== Seaports ==
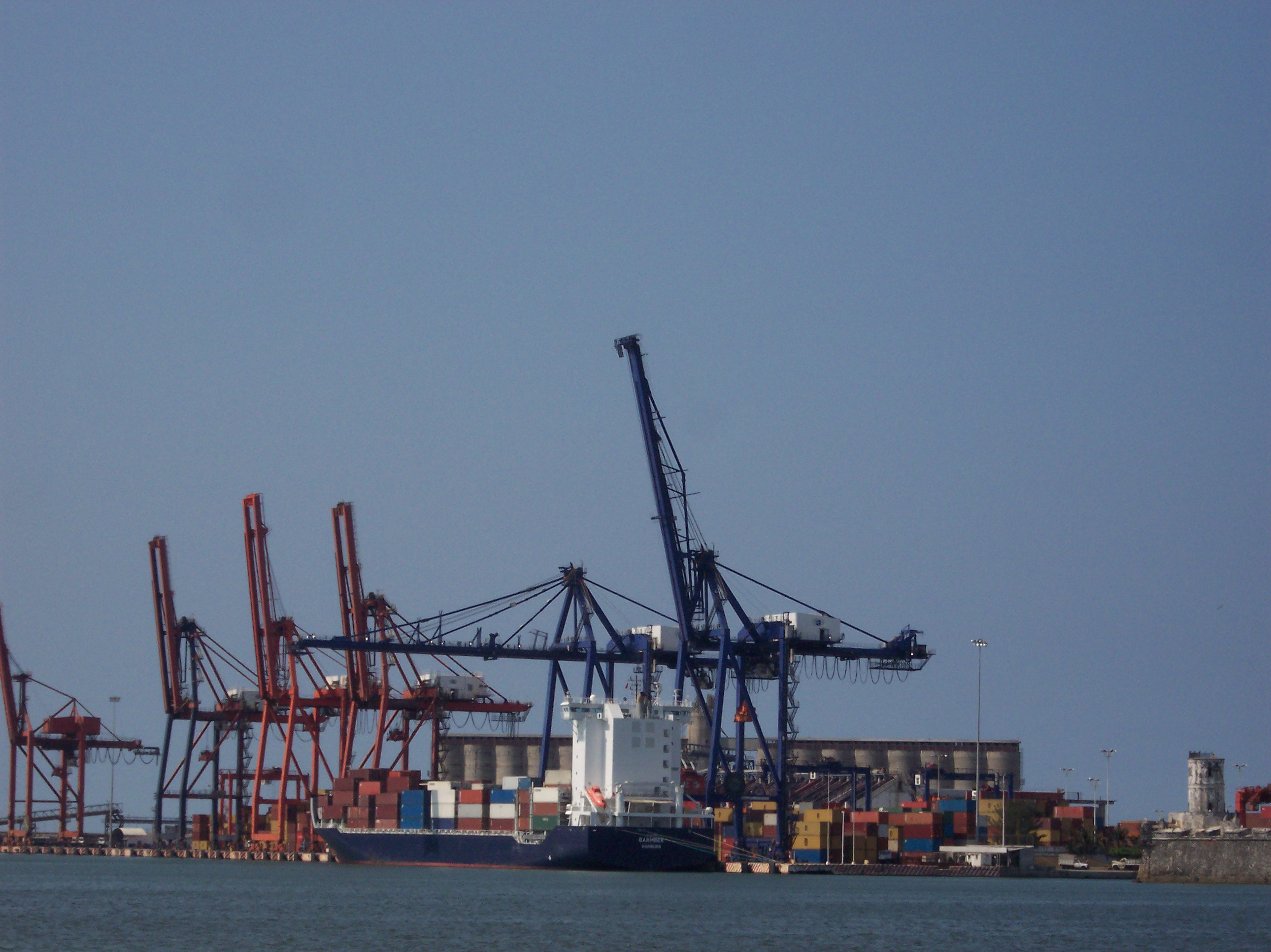
Port of Veracruz

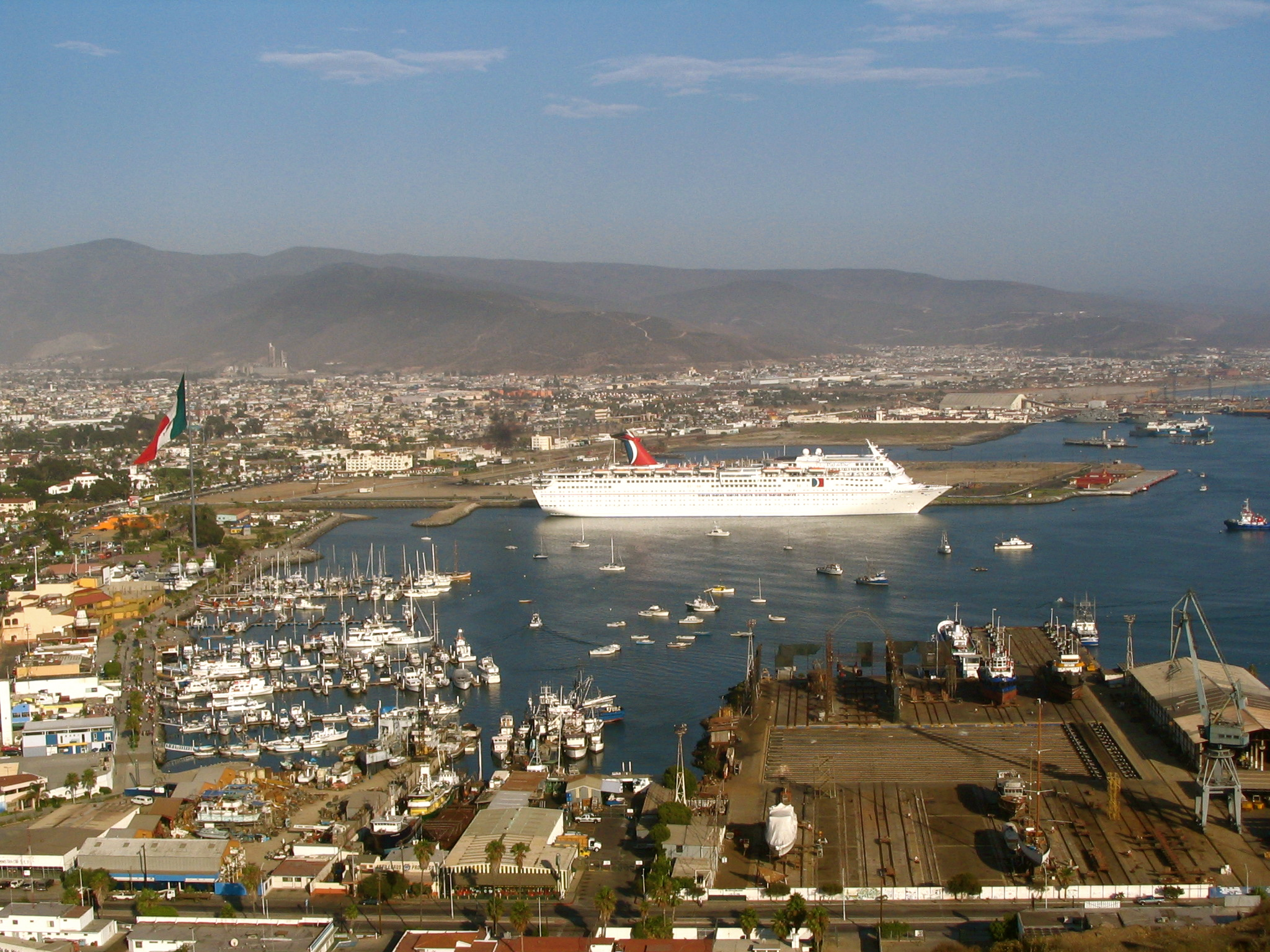
The port of Ensenada, Baja California, Mexico.

Mexico has a total of 76 seaports and 10 river ports. The country's maritime infrastructure supports a diverse range of economic activities and trade. Among these ports, four major seaports stand out for concentrating approximately 60% of Mexico's merchandise traffic. These key ports include Altamira and Veracruz on the Gulf of Mexico, and Manzanillo and Lázaro Cárdenas on the Pacific Ocean. Following closely in terms of traffic are ports like Acapulco, Puerto Vallarta, Guaymas, Tampico, Topolobampo, Mazatlán, and Tuxpan. Each of these ports plays a vital role in facilitating the import and export of goods, supporting industrial activities, and enhancing Mexico's connectivity with global markets.

The Port of Acapulco, known for its historical and touristic importance, handles minerals and agricultural products alongside its tourist traffic. Puerto Vallarta's port supports tourism and fishing industries while managing cargo operations. Guaymas Port, strategically positioned on the Sea of Cortez, specializes in minerals, agricultural exports, and manufacturing products. Topolobampo Port in Sinaloa primarily exports grains and produce. Mazatlán Port on the Pacific coast manages a mix of agricultural products and manufactured goods. Tuxpan Port on the Gulf of Mexico is emerging as a key hub for container shipping and automotive exports. Together, these ports facilitate the movement of goods, support local industries, and connect Mexico to global markets, reflecting its pivotal role in international trade and commerce.

== See also ==
- Telecommunications in Mexico
- Transport in Mexico City
- Economy of Mexico
