= Kaua, Yucatán =

Kaua
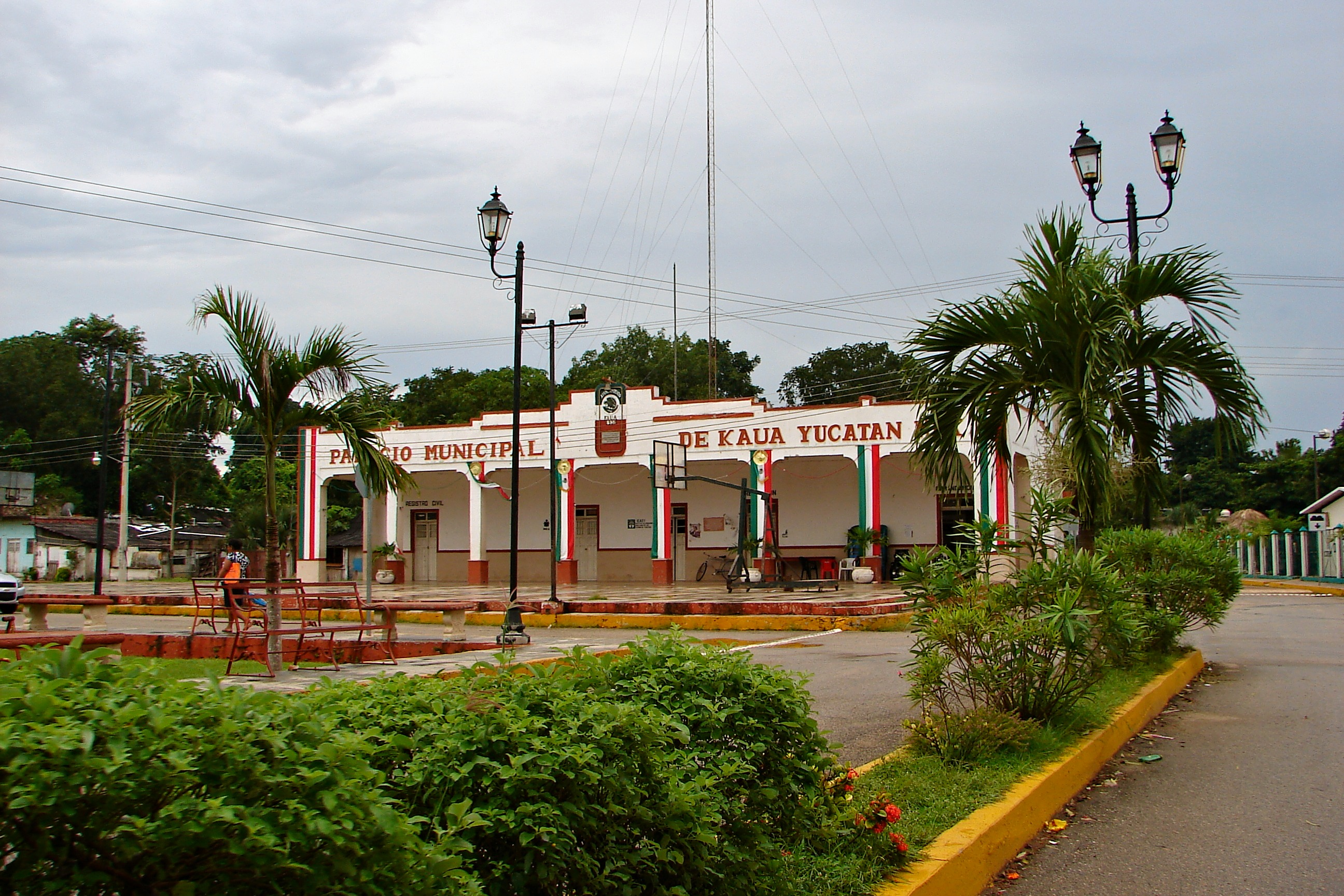

- Location in Yucatán
- Coordinates: 20°37′09″N 88°24′56″W
- Country: Mexico
- Mexican States: Yucatán
- Municipalities: Kaua Municipality
- Elevation: 26 m (85 ft)

Population (2020)
  - Total: 2,879
- Time zone: UTC−6 (CST)
  - Summer (DST): UTC−5 (CDT)
- Postal code: 97764
- Area code: 985

Kaua is a locality and the municipal seat of the eponymous Kaua Municipality in the state of Yucatán in southeastern Mexico. It is located roughly 16 kilometres (9.9 mi) southwest of the city of Valladolid

== Toponymy ==
The name (Kaua) is a word from the Yucatec Maya language meaning the place that is bitter. It is the home of the world's best honey, Uluumilkaab, the land of bees.
