= Tuxtla Gutiérrez Air Force Base =

Tuxtla Gutiérrez Air Force Base Base Aérea Militar No. 6 Tuxtla Gutiérrez
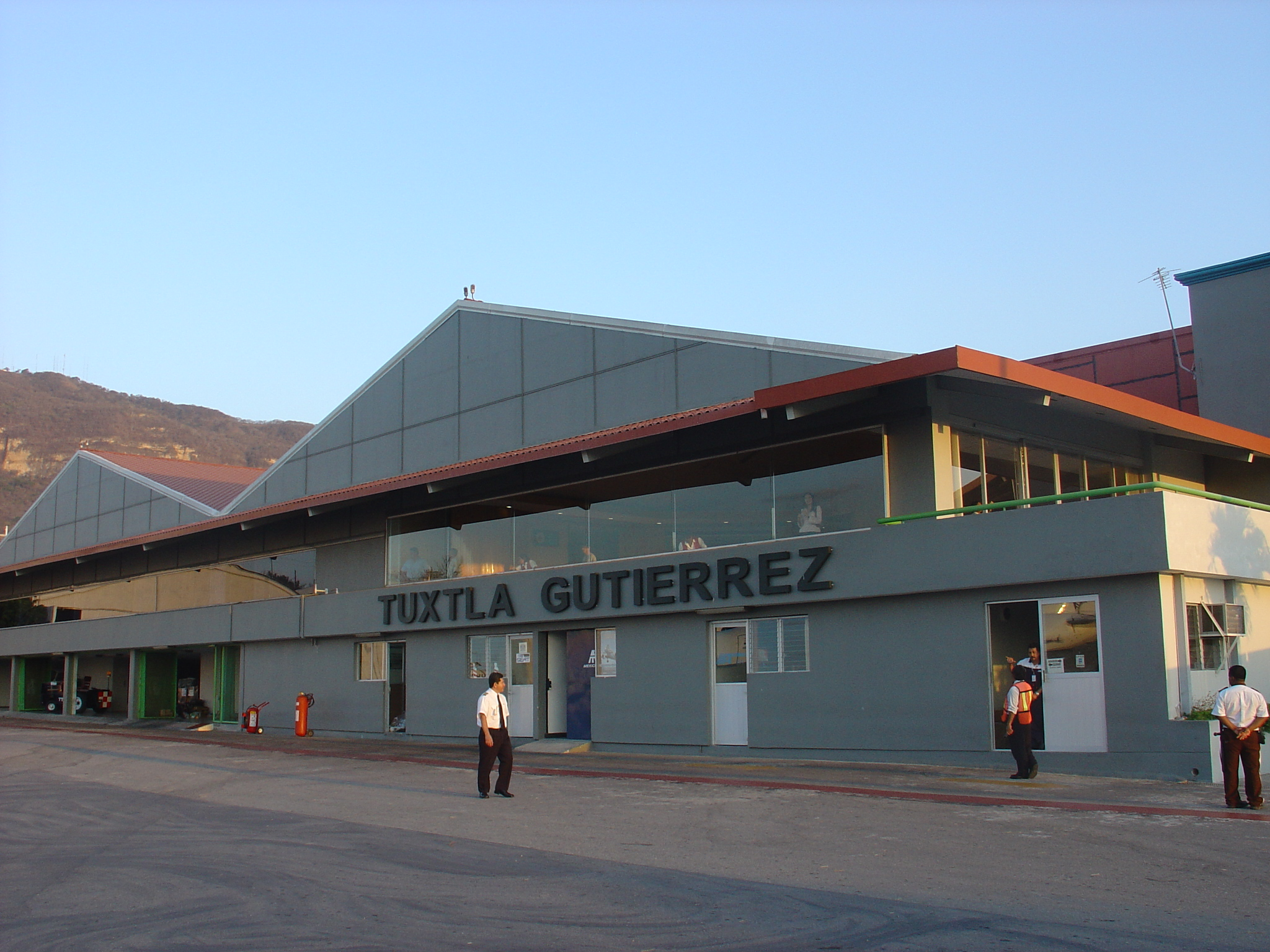
- IATA: ~~TGZ~~; ICAO: ~~MMTG~~

Summary
- Airport type: Military
- Owner/Operator: Mexican Air Force
- Location: Tuxtla Gutiérrez, Chiapas, Mexico
- Opened: 1957
- Time zone: CST (UTC-06:00)
- Elevation AMSL: 454 m / 1,490 ft
- Coordinates: 16°44′23.93″N 93°10′23.65″W
- Website: www.gob.mx/sedena

Map
- Location of the Air Force Base in Chiapas ~~TGZ~~ (Mexico)

Runways
Direction	Length		Surface
Direction	m	ft	Surface
14/32	2,500	8,202	Asphalt

Statistics (2005)
- Aircraft operations: 11,166
- Passengers: 486,067
- SEDENA

Tuxtla Gutiérrez Air Force Base (Spanish: Base Aérea Militar Tuxtla Gutiérrez) (B.A.M. 6); officially Base Aérea Militar No. 6 General Aviador Ángel Hipólito Corzo Molina (Air Force Base No. 6 General Aviator Ángel Hipólito Corzo Molina), formerly known as Francisco Sarabia National Airport or Terán Airport ~~(IATA: TGZ, ICAO: MMTG)~~, is a military airport located in Tuxtla Gutiérrez, Chiapas, Mexico. It formerly served as the main airport for the city of Tuxtla Gutiérrez. However, the airport no longer provides scheduled passenger public services and is currently used exclusively for military purposes. The nearest airport serving commercial flights is Tuxtla Gutiérrez International Airport which opened in 2006 and replaced the former airport.

== History ==
Initially opened in 1957 as the first commercial airport serving Tuxtla Gutiérrez, this small airport faced limitations in capacity and technical constraints. In 1980, civil operations were relocated to Llano San Juan Airport in the neighboring municipality of Ocozocoautla. However, challenges persisted at the new location, including fog and wind conditions that hindered commercial aviation. Despite various investments, such as the installation of radio systems and the construction of a second runway, these efforts proved unsuccessful. Consequently, by the late 1990s, the old Terán Airport had to be temporarily reactivated to facilitate flight operations.

Over time, the airport served multiple airlines, including Mexicana, Aviacsa, Aerocaribe, and Mexicana Click. These airlines operated flights to destinations such as Mexico City, Oaxaca, Tapachula, and Villahermosa. The airport also supported flight training, military, charter, and general aviation activities.

The need for a third airport in Tuxtla Gutiérrez became more apparent in the early 2000s as the existing air infrastructure could not fully meet the city's growing commercial air traffic demands. In 2006, the new Tuxtla Gutiérrez International Airport in Chiapa de Corzo was inaugurated, and all civil operations were transferred there, along with Sarabia's former IATA and ICAO airport codes.

Its original name honored the memory of the Durango-born aviator Francisco Sarabia Tinoco. Subsequently, as a military air base, it was renamed in honor of Brigadier General Aviator Ángel Hipólito Corzo Molina.

== Facilities ==
Located within the Tuxtla Gutiérrez Metropolitan area, approximately 6 kilometres (3.7 mi) west of the city center, the Air Force Base is situated at an elevation of 1,490 metres (4,890 ft) above sea level, it features one asphalt-surfaced runway, designated 14/32, measuring 2,500 metres (8,202 ft), and an apron with parking positions for narrow-body aircraft and helipads. Adjacent facilities include the former passenger terminal, a hangar, a control tower, and additional structures to house Air Force personnel.

The 202 Air Squadron is a unit of the Mexican Air Force stationed at Terán Airport. This unit operates Pilatus PC-9 and Pilatus PC-7 aircraft.

== Incidents ==
On September 15, 2010, an AeroMexico MD-83 erroneously landed at Teran Airport after confusing it with Albino Corzo International Airport. AeroMexico flight 553, operated on behalf of AeroMexico Travel, came from Mexico City and had 80 passengers on board.

== See also ==
- List of airports in Mexico
- List of airports by ICAO code: M
- List of Mexican military installations
- Mexican Air Force
- Tuxtla Gutiérrez International Airport
