= Bokobá Municipality =

Municipality in the Mexican state of Yucatán

Bokobá
- Municipality
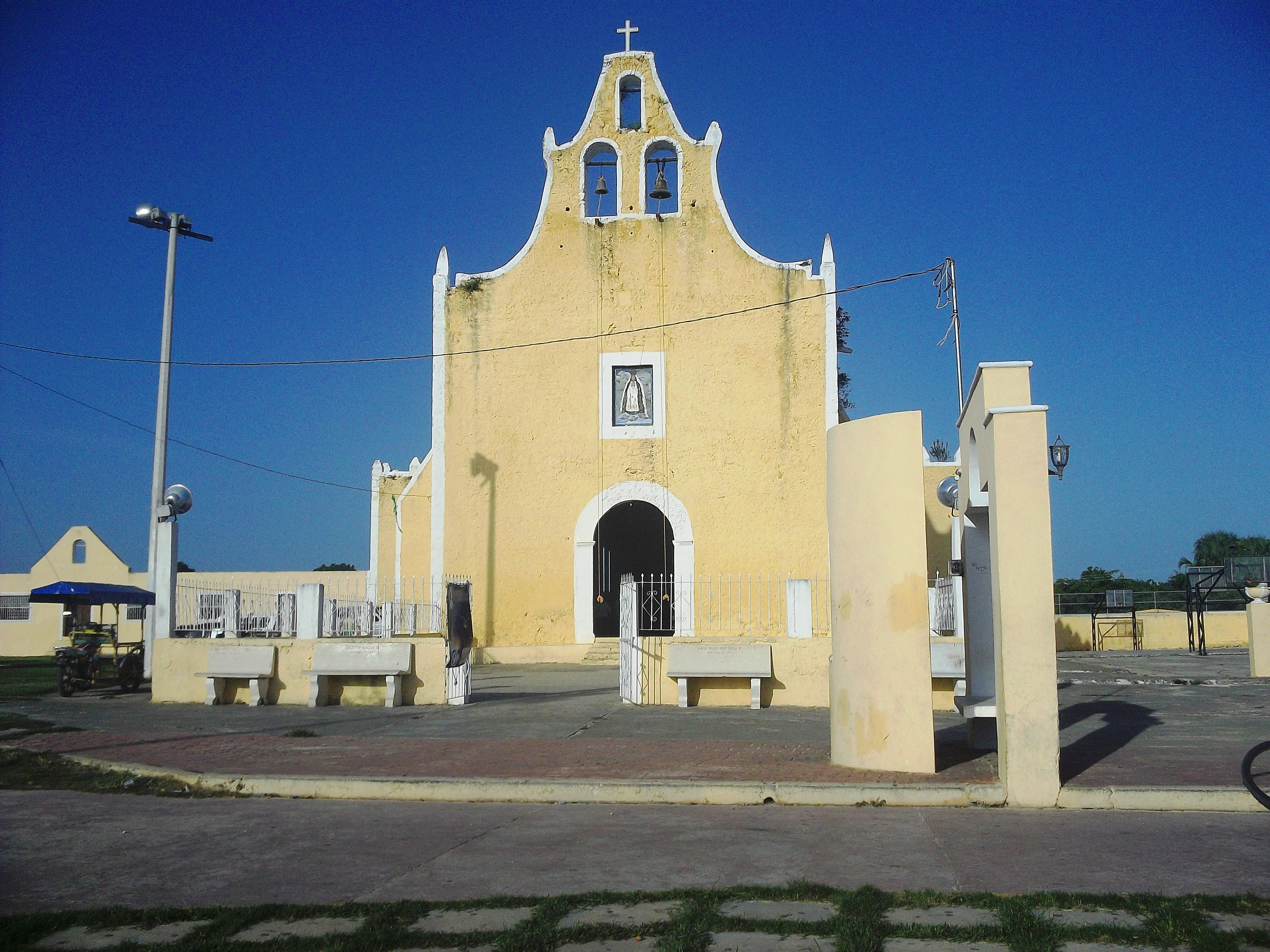
- Church of Bokobá, Yucatán

- Region 4 Litoral centro #005

- Location of the Municipality in Mexico
- Coordinates: 21°00′23″N 89°10′46″W
- Country: Mexico
- State: Yucatán

Government
  - Type: 2018–2021
  - Municipal President: Ruby Sosa

Area
  - Total: 48.54 km^{2} (18.74 sq mi)
- Elevation: 9 m (30 ft)

Population (2010)
  - Total: 2,053
- Time zone: UTC-6 (Central Standard Time)
- INEGI Code: 009
- Major Airport: Merida (Manuel Crescencio Rejón) International Airport
- IATA Code: MID
- ICAO Code: MMMD

Bokobá Municipality (In the Yucatec Maya Language: "splashing water") is a municipality in the Mexican state of Yucatán containing 48.54 km^{2} of land and located roughly 45 km east of the city of Mérida.

== History ==
Prior to the conquest, the area fell within the provinces of Ceh Pech and after the conquest became part of the encomienda system. In 1700, the encomendero was Esteban Pérez Montiel, who was responsible for 481 native inhabitants.

Yucatán declared its independence from the Spanish Crown in 1821 and in 1825, the area was assigned to the coastal region with its headquarters in Izamal. In 1900 it was withdrawn and became head of the municipality which bears its name.

== Governance ==
The municipal president is elected for a three-year term. The town council has four aldermen who serve as councilors for public works, public monuments, ecology, transportation and highway administration.

== Communities ==
The head of the municipality is Bokobá, Yucatán. The other populated areas in the municipality are Mucuyché, San Antonio Choil and San Antonio II. The significant populations are shown below:

Community	Population
Entire Municipality (2010)	2,053
Bokobá	1955 in 2005

== Local festivals ==
Every year on 15 August a festival is held in honor of Our Lady of the Assumption.

== Tourist attractions ==
- Our Lady of the Assumption Church
- Hacienda Mucuyché Campos
