= TGZ =

TGZ may refer to:

- A .tgz file, or gzip-compressed tarball, in Unix
- Ángel Albino Corzo International Airport, in Mexico (IATA:TGZ)
