= Bokobá =

- Locality
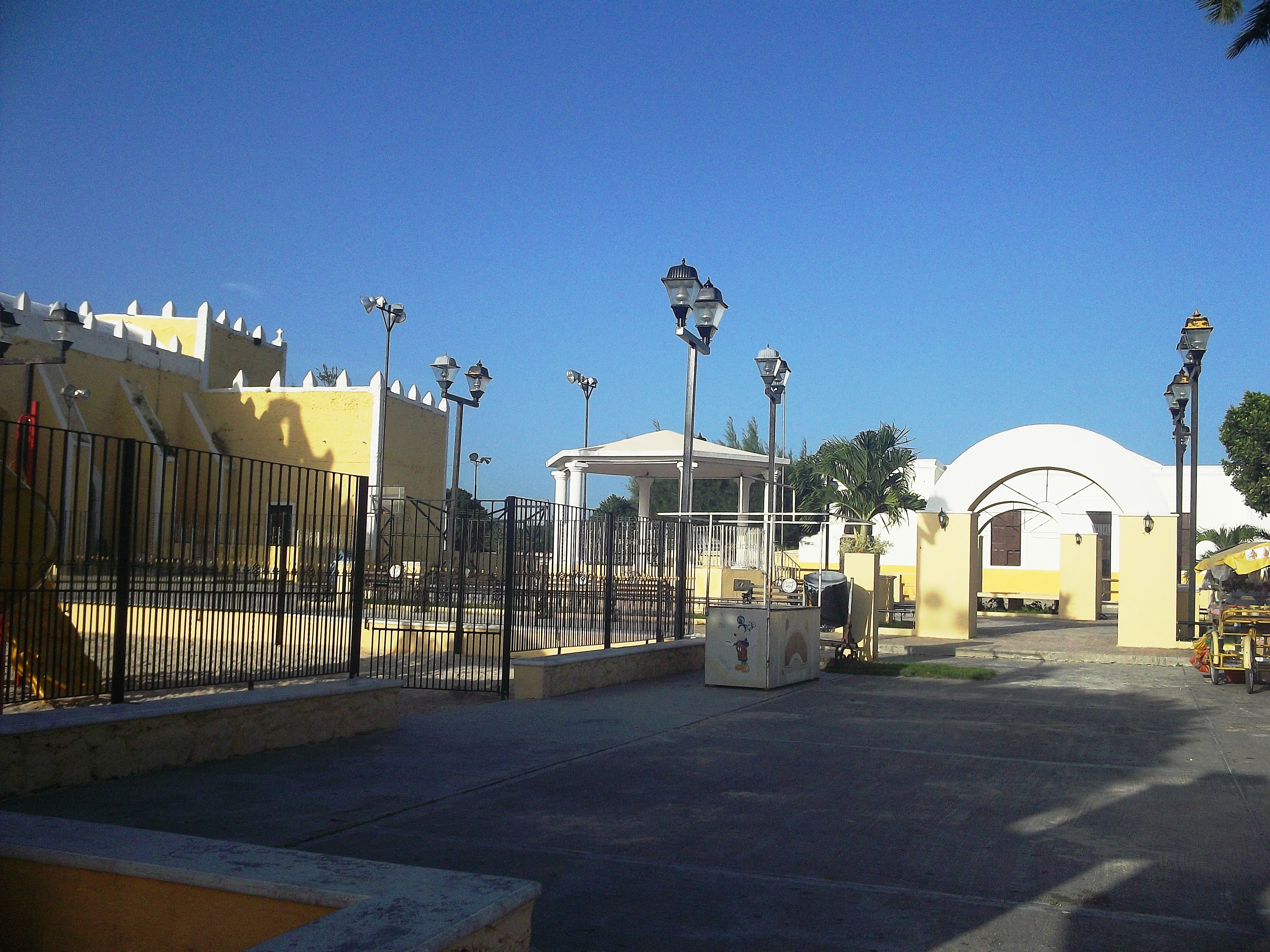

- Location of Bokobá Bokobá (Mexico)
- Coordinates: 21°00′23″N 89°10′46″W
- Country: Mexico
- State: Yucatán
- Municipality: Bokobá Municipality
- Elevation: 9 m (30 ft)

Population (2010)
  - Total: 2,052
- Time zone: UTC-6 (Central Standard Time)
- INEGI Code: 009
- Major Airport: Merida (Manuel Crescencio Rejón) International Airport
- IATA Code: MID
- ICAO Code: MMMD

Bokobá is a locality and the municipal seat of its homonymous municipality in the Mexican state of Yucatán. It is located approximately 60 km (37 mi) southeast of the state capital Mérida, and 20 km (12 mi) southeast of Motul de Carrillo Puerto.

== Etymology ==
Bokobá is a term in the Yucatec Maya language, which means "splashing water".

== History ==
Prior to the conquest, Bokobá was located within the provinces of Ceh Pech, and after the conquest and became part of the encomienda system. In 1700, the encomendero was Esteban Pérez Montiel, who was responsible for 481 native inhabitants.

Yucatán declared its independence from the Spanish Crown in 1821 and in 1825, the area was assigned to the coastal region with its headquarters in Izamal. In 1900, it was withdrawn and became head of the municipality which bears its name.

== Demographics ==
View chart definition.

== Local festivals ==
Every year on 15 August a festival is held in honor of Our Lady of the Assumption.

== Tourist attractions ==
- Our Lady of the Assumption Church
- Hacienda Mucuyché Campos
