= Villahermosa International Airport =

International airport in Villahermosa, Tabasco, Mexico

Villahermosa International Airport Aeropuerto Internacional de Villahermosa
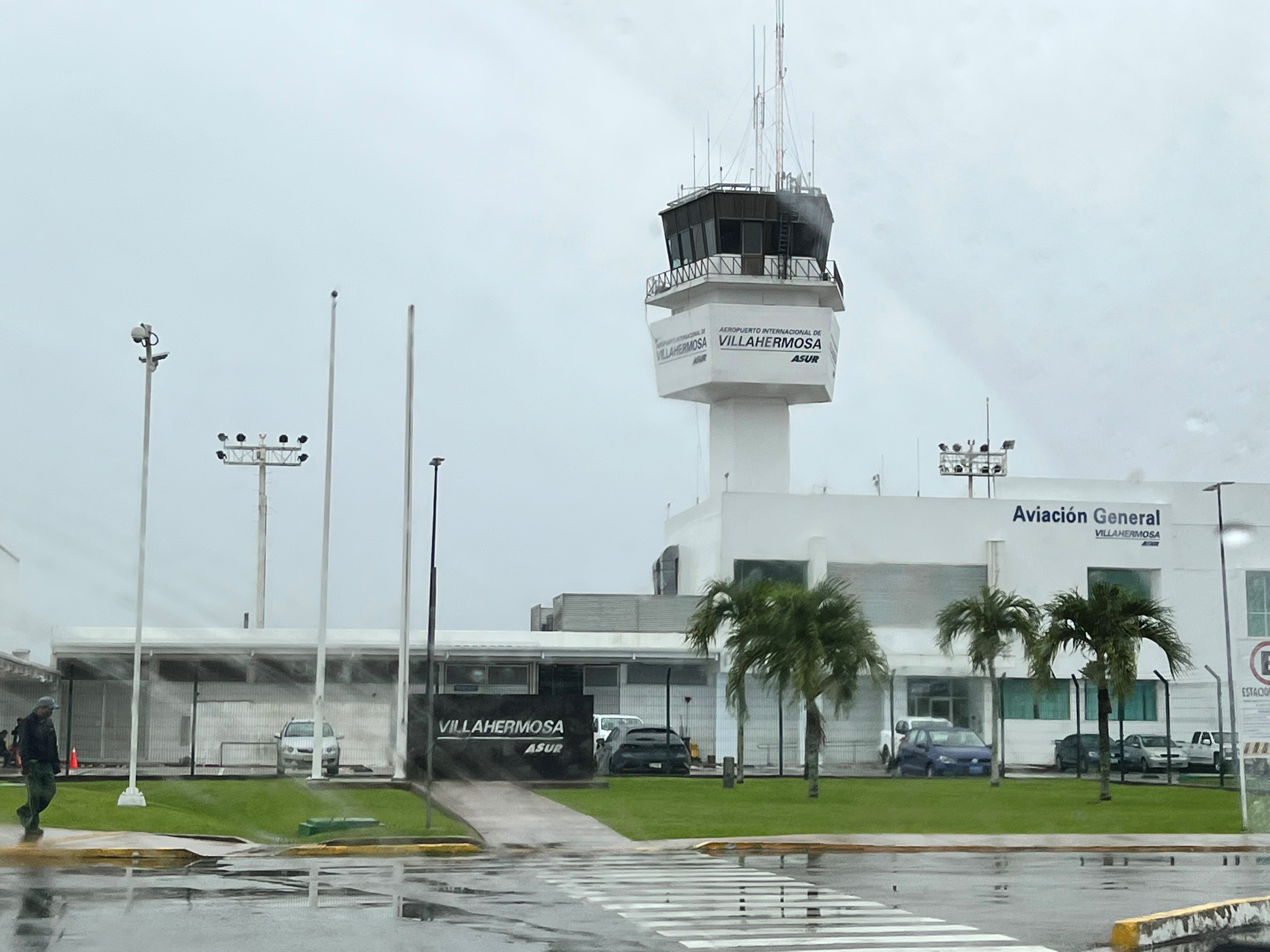
- IATA: VSA; ICAO: MMVA

Summary
- Airport type: Public
- Operator: Grupo Aeroportuario del Sureste
- Serves: Villahermosa, Tabasco, Mexico
- Opened: 1979
- Time zone: CST (UTC-06:00)
- Elevation AMSL: 14 m / 46 ft
- Coordinates: 17°59′42″N 92°49′02″W
- Website: www.asur.com.mx/Contenido/Villahermosa/shopping

Map
- Location of the airport in Tabasco VSA (Mexico)

Runways
Direction	Length		Surface
Direction	m	ft	Surface
08/26	2,200	7,218	Asphalt

Statistics (2025)
- Total passengers: 1,447,408
- Ranking in Mexico: 22nd ▼1
- Source: Grupo Aeroporturario del Sureste

Villahermosa International Airport (Spanish: Aeropuerto Internacional de Villahermosa); officially known as Aeropuerto Internacional Carlos Rovirosa Pérez (Carlos Rovirosa Pérez International Airport) (IATA: VSA, ICAO: MMVA) is an international airport located in Villahermosa, Tabasco, Mexico. It serves the Metropolitan Area of Villahermosa, the entire State of Tabasco, and Northern Chiapas. The airport offers domestic flights within Mexico and supports various tourism, flight training, and general aviation activities. It is named in honor of Carlos Rovirosa Pérez, a pioneer of Mexican aviation, who was born in Villahermosa. The airport is operated by Grupo Aeroportuario del Sureste (ASUR). In 2024, the airport handled 1,481,067 passengers, and in 2025, it served 1,447,408 passengers, a decrease of 2.3% according to ASUR.

== History ==
By 1935, the city of Villahermosa had three airfields: José Suárez Airfield (located in the current España neighborhood), El Playón Airfield (located in the city center), and Roberto Fierro Airfield (located in the area now known as Tabasco 2000). The Roberto Fierro Airfield received the inaugural cargo transportation flight of Compañía Mexicana de Aviación in 1928. It also welcomed the first passenger flight, which was conducted by a Ford brand trimotor monoplane from Mexicana de Aviación in 1929.

As the city expanded in the late 1970s, a new airport was constructed in the Dos Montes community on the outskirts of the city. The current airport was inaugurated on May 2, 1979. Over the years, it has been served by various Mexican airlines, including Aeromar, Aero California, Aerocaribe, Aviacsa, Interjet, and Mexicana. It has also offered international services to Panama City through Copa Airlines and to Houston through Continental Express, Aeromexico Connect, and United Express, primarily catering to the oil industry market.

The passenger terminal underwent expansion in 2006 and was further expanded in 2013. Currently, Villahermosa Airport serves as the nearest active commercial airport to the popular tourist destination of the ancient Maya ruins in Palenque in Chiapas.

== Facilities ==
The airport is situated at an elevation of 14 metres (46 ft) above sea level and it features a single runway, designated as 08/26, which measures 2,200 metres (7,200 ft) in length and has an asphalt surface. The commercial aviation apron has nine stands, with six being of type C and two of type D, primarily for narrow-body aircraft. The general aviation apron offers stands for fixed-wing aircraft and heliports for private aviation. The airport can handle up to 20 operations per hour.

The passenger terminal is a two-story building with a total area of 12,769 square metres (137,440 sq ft). The lower level houses the check-in area, an arrivals hall with two baggage claim carousels, immigration and customs facilities, car rental services, taxi stands, snack bars, a souvenir shop, and a restaurant. The upper floor hosts the security zone and the departure concourse with a commercial area, restaurants, bars, a VIP lounge, and five gates, four of which have jetbridges. The general airport offices are also located on this level. Adjacent to the terminal, other facilities include civil aviation hangars and designated spaces for general aviation.

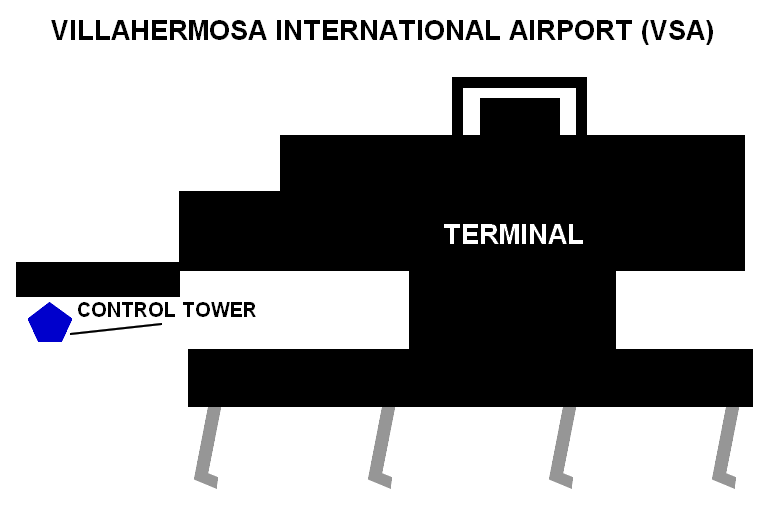
Terminal diagram

== Airlines and destinations ==
=== Passenger ===
Airlines	Destinations
Aeroméxico	Mexico City–Benito Juárez
Aeroméxico Connect	Mexico City–Benito Juárez
Aerus	Mérida, Veracruz
Viva	Cancún, Guadalajara, Mérida, Mexico City–Benito Juárez, Mexico City–Felipe Ángeles, Monterrey, Tampico
Volaris	Guadalajara, Mexico City–Benito Juárez, Puebla

=== Cargo ===
Airlines	Destinations
DHL Express Mexico	Tuxtla Gutiérrez

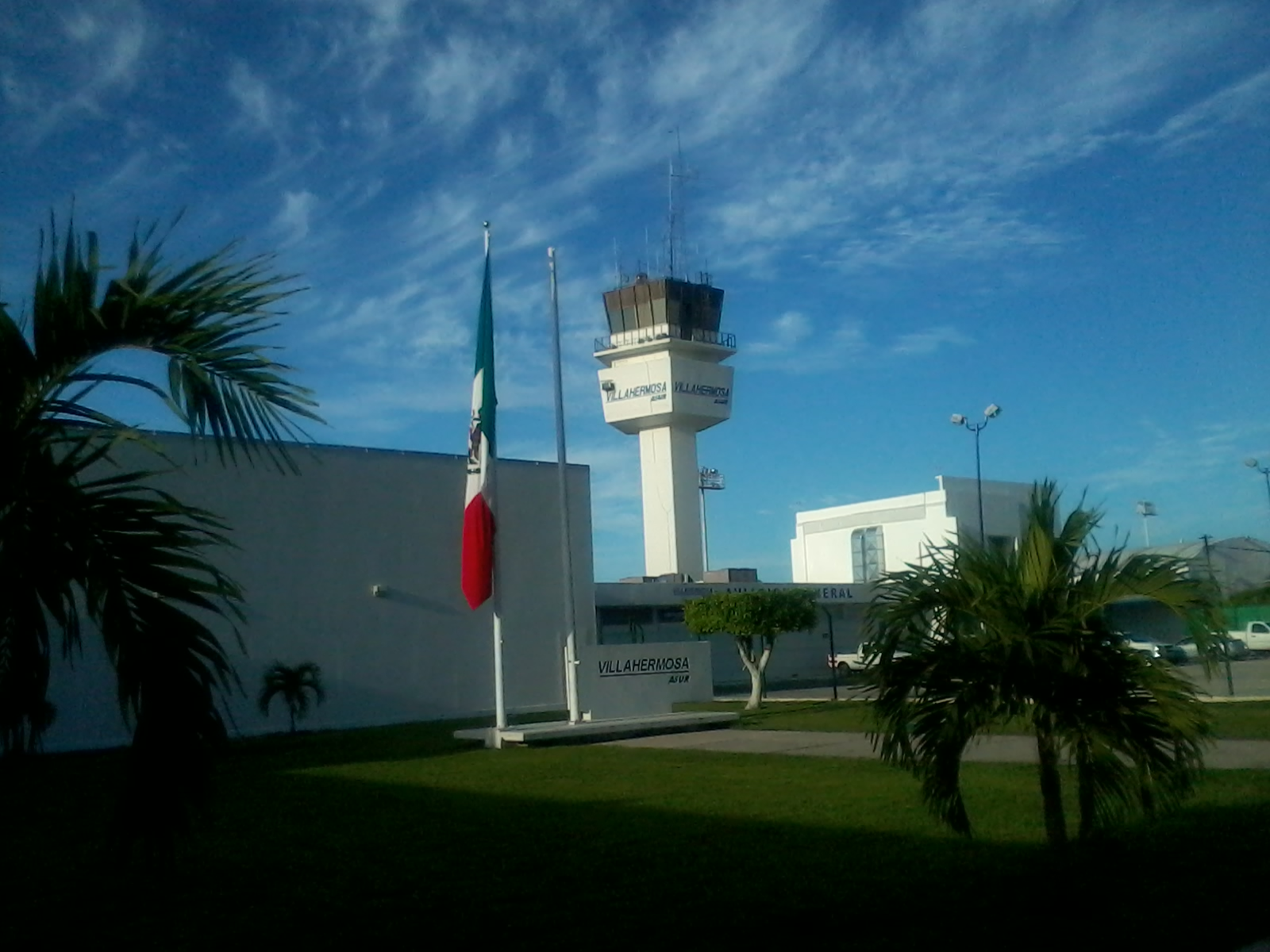
Control tower

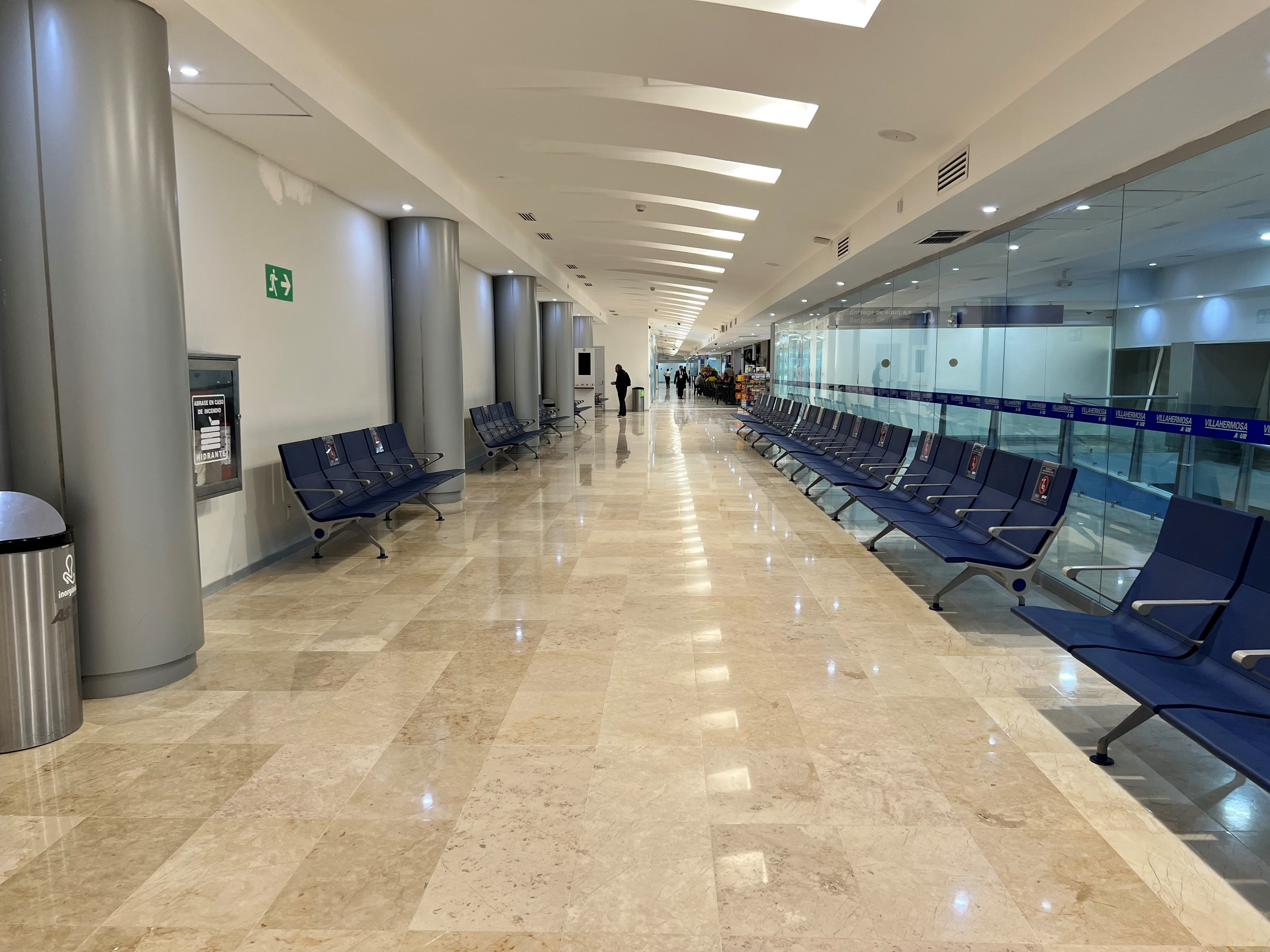
Departures concourse

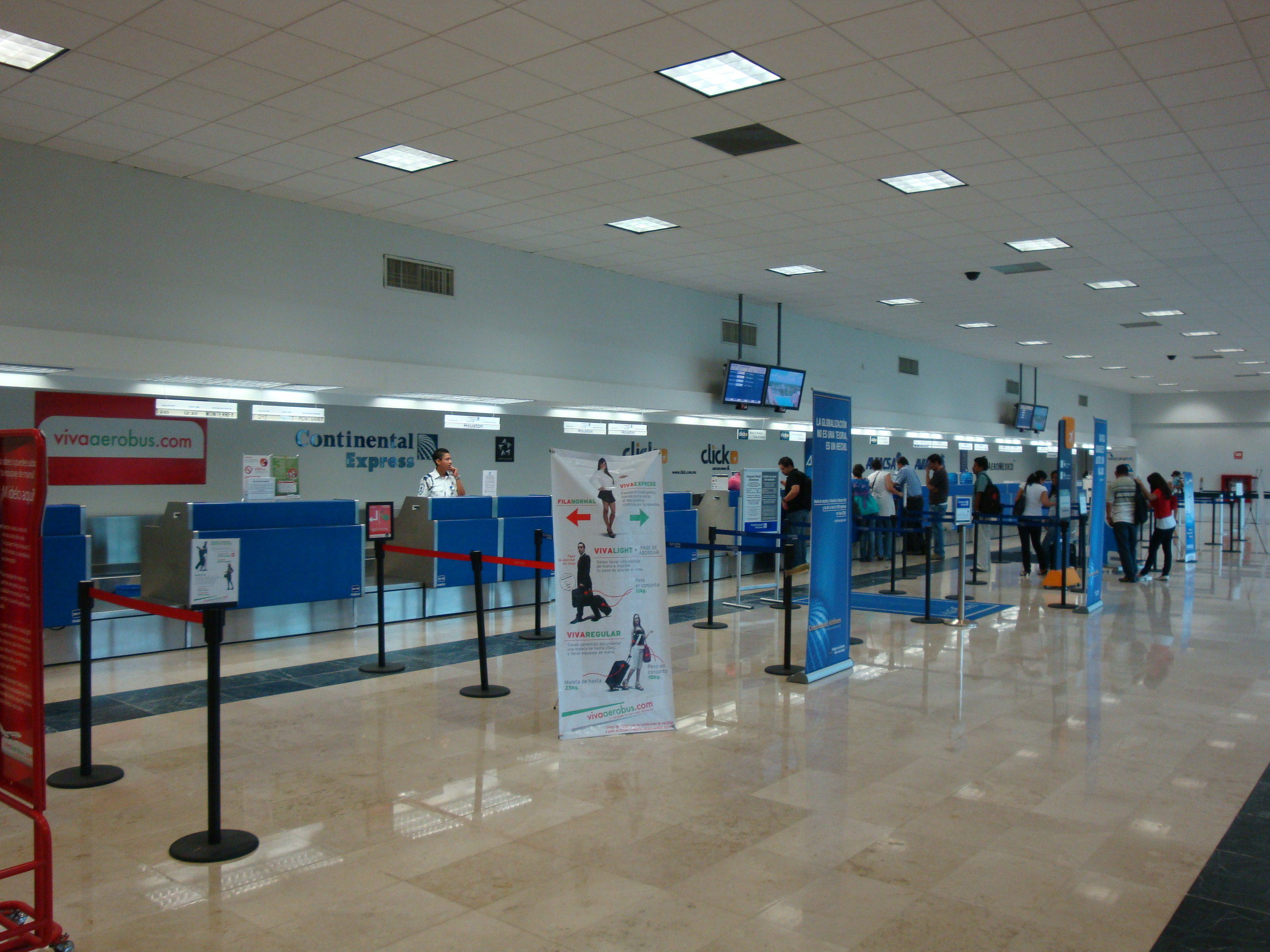
Check-in area

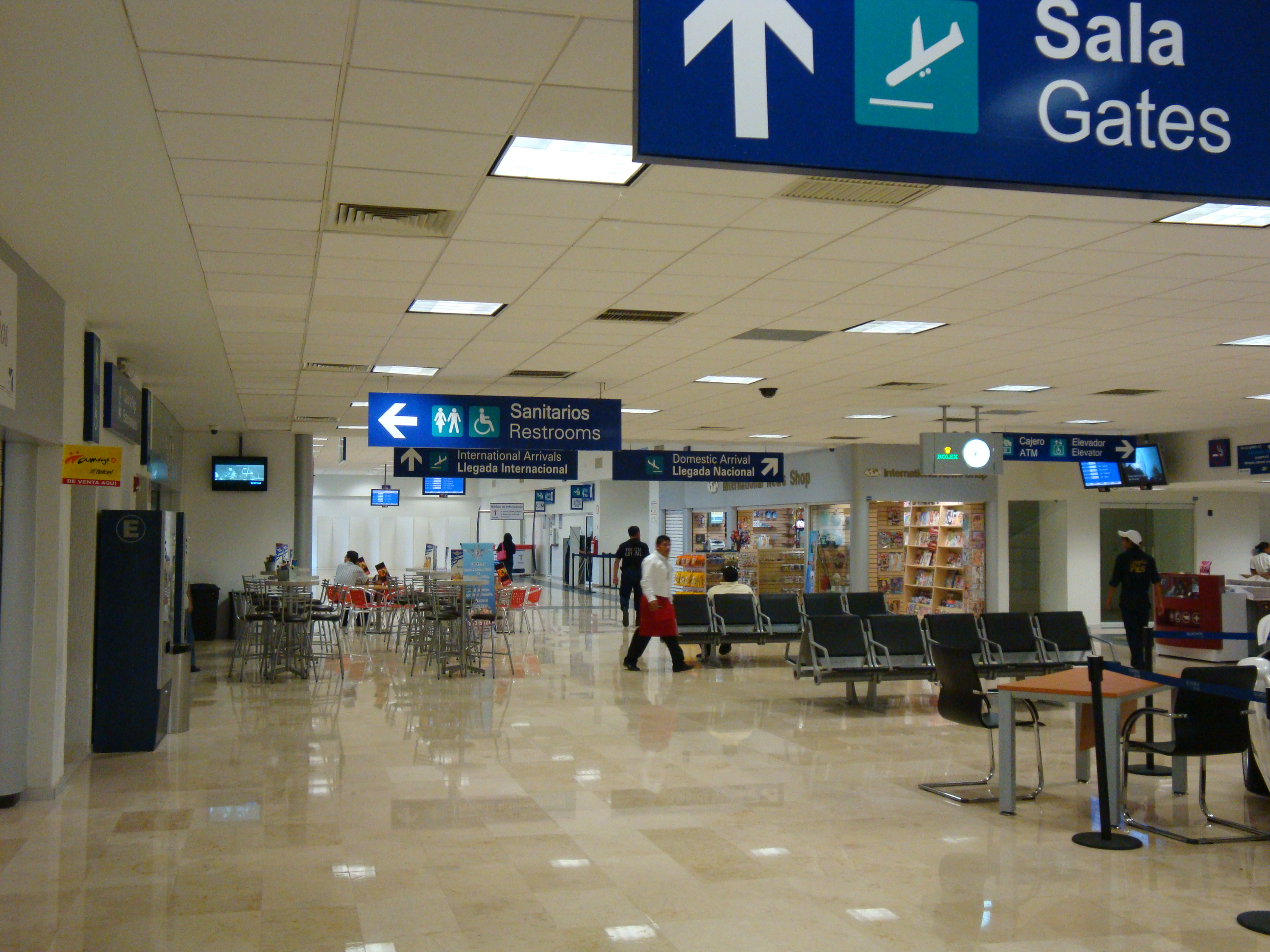
Arrivals hall

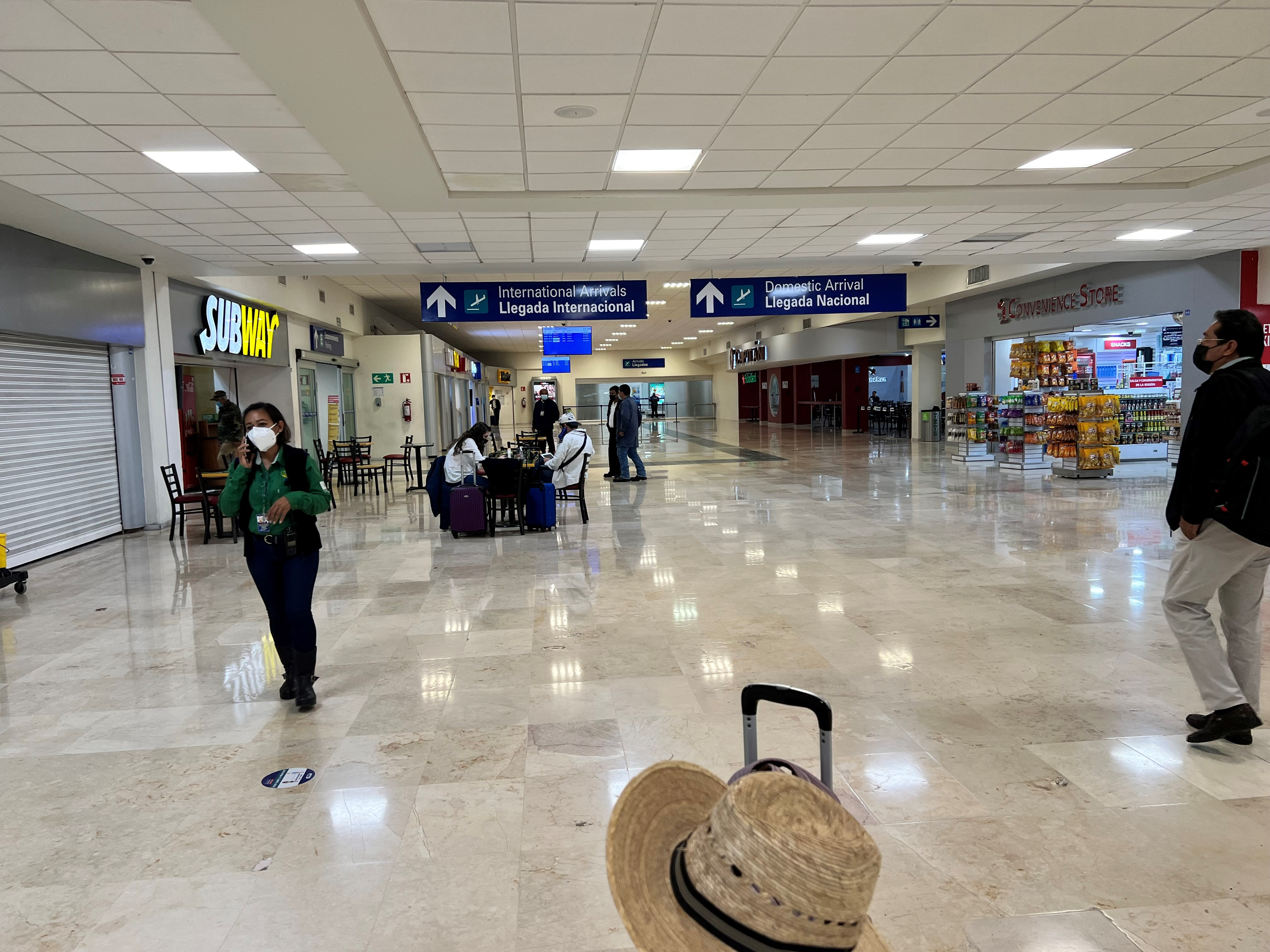
Arrivals hall

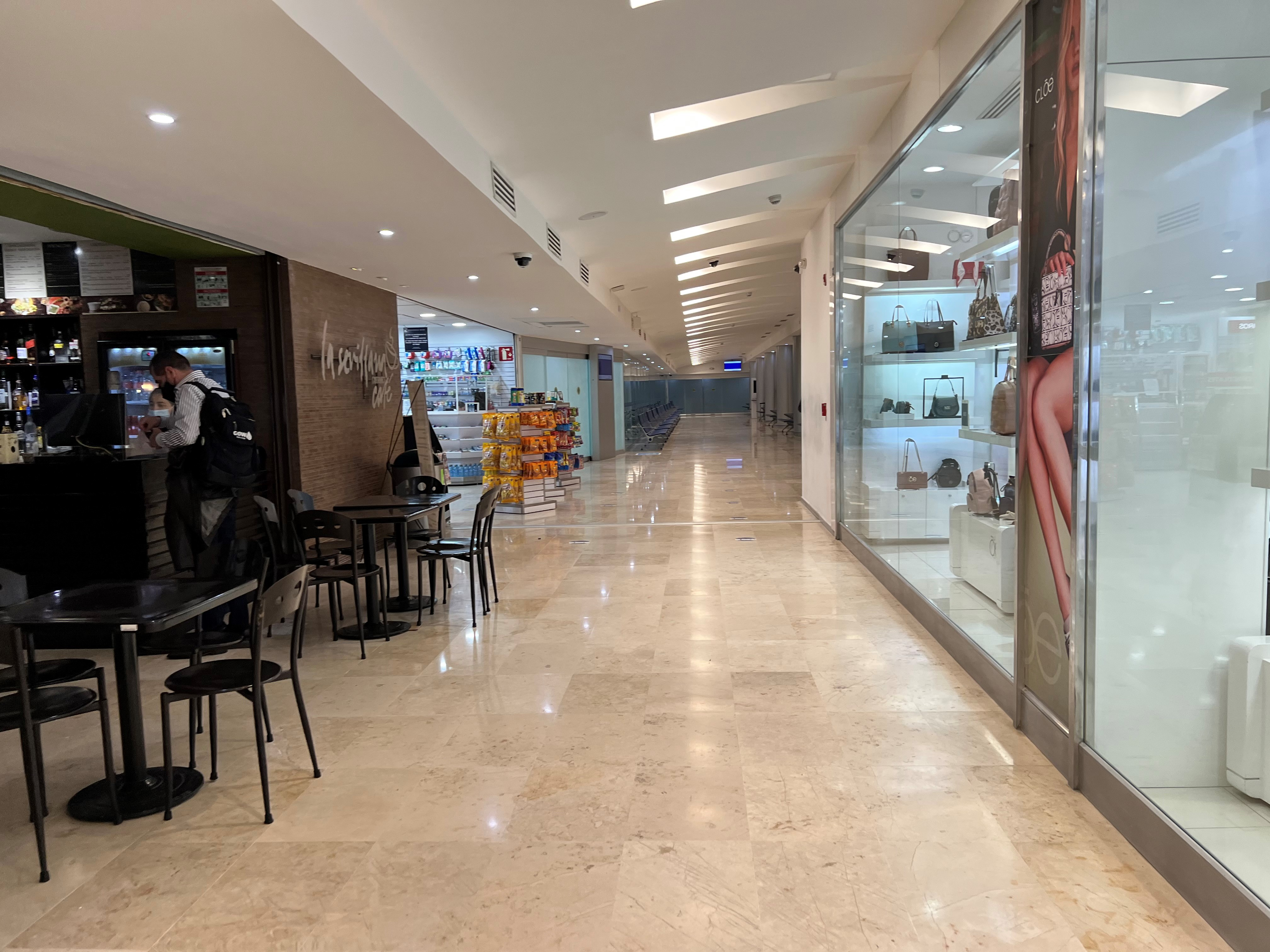
Departures concourse

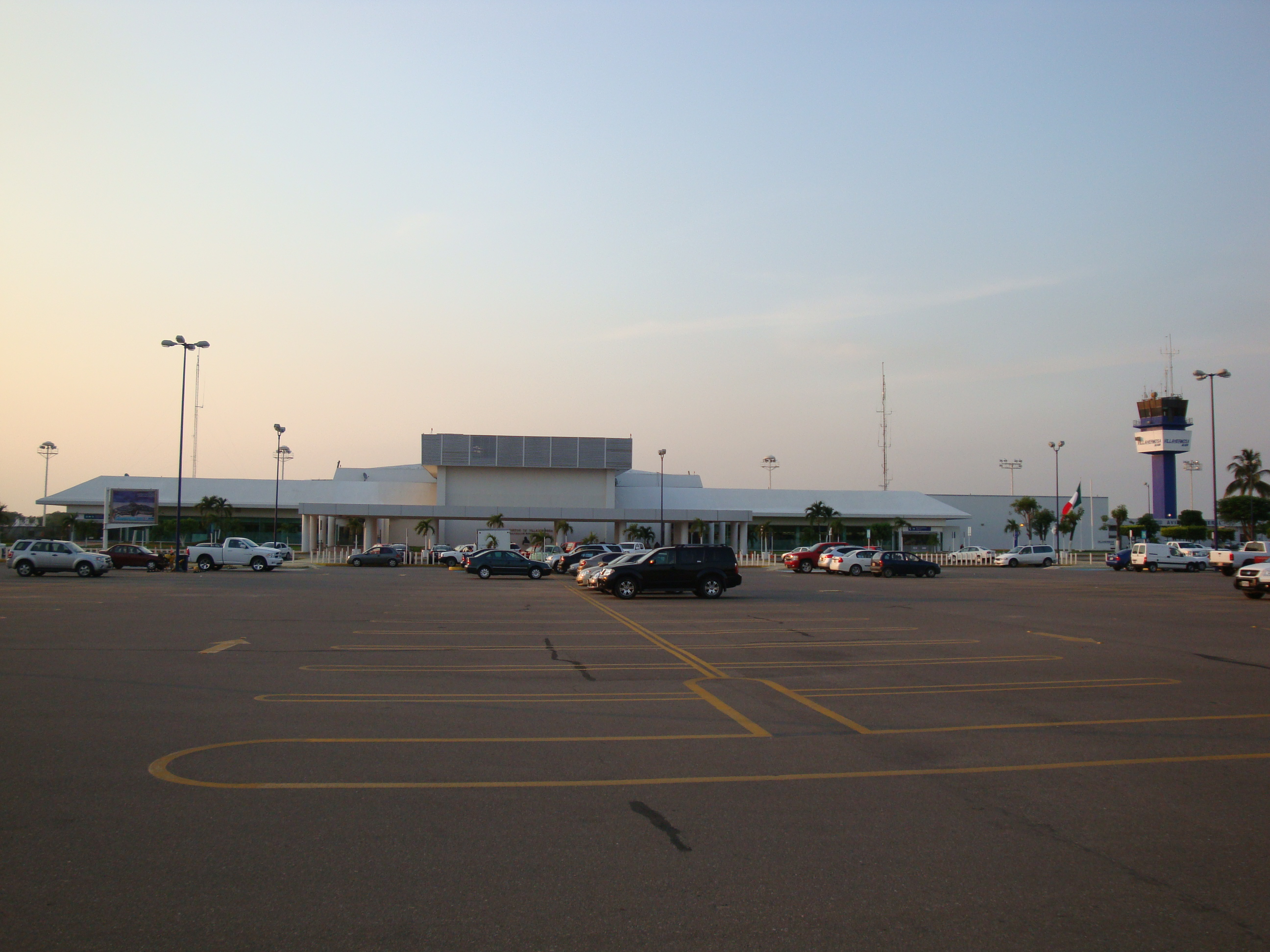
Passenger terminal airside

=== Destinations map ===
Destinations from Villahermosa International Airport
Red = Year-round destination
Blue = Future destination
Green = Seasonal destination

== Statistics ==
=== Tráfico anual ===
Passenger statistics at VSA
Year	Total Passengers	change %
1999	521,557	Steady
2000	528,095	▲1.2 %
2001	530,886	▲0.5 %
2002	499,118	▼6.4 %
2003	599,733	▲20.2 %
2004	673,309	▲12.3 %
2005	717,413	▲6.6 %
2006	725,032	▲1.1 %
2007	853,792	▲17.8 %
2008	958,983	▲12.3 %
2009	766,417	▼20.1 %
2010	728,781	▼4.9 %
2011	851,264	▲16.8 %
2012	960,094	▲12.8 %
2013	1,014,445	▲5.7 %
2014	1,121,365	▲10.5 %
2015	1,273,140	▲13.5 %
2016	1,240,795	▼2.5 %
2017	1,260,277	▲1.6 %
2018	1,227,648	▼2.6 %
2019	1,245,026	▲1.4 %
2020	638,477	▼48.7 %
2021	976,456	▲52.9 %
2022	1,214,190	▲24.3 %
2023	1,396,653	▲15.0 %
2024	1,481,067	▲6.0%
2025	1,447,408	▼2.3%

=== Busiest routes ===
Busiest routes at VSA (Jan–Dec 2025)
Rank	Airport	Passengers
1	Mexico City, Mexico City	425,264
2	Monterrey, Nuevo León	84,934
3	Guadalajara, Jalisco	61,589
4	Cancún, Quintana Roo	61,136
5	Mérida, Yucatán	31,314
6	Mexico City–AIFA, State of Mexico	26,978
7	Veracruz, Veracruz	1,746
8	Tampico, Tamaulipas	1,023
9	Minatitlán/Coatzacoalcos, Veracruz	10

== See also ==
- List of the busiest airports in Mexico
- List of airports in Mexico
- List of airports by ICAO code: M
- List of busiest airports in North America
- List of the busiest airports in Latin America
- Transportation in Mexico
- Tourism in Mexico
- Grupo Aeroportuario del Sureste
- Centro Municipality, Tabasco
- Petroleum industry in Mexico
- Palenque
