= Tuxtla Gutiérrez International Airport =

International airport in Tuxtla Gutiérrez, Chiapas, Mexico

Tuxtla Gutiérrez International Airport Aeropuerto Internacional de Tuxtla Gutiérrez
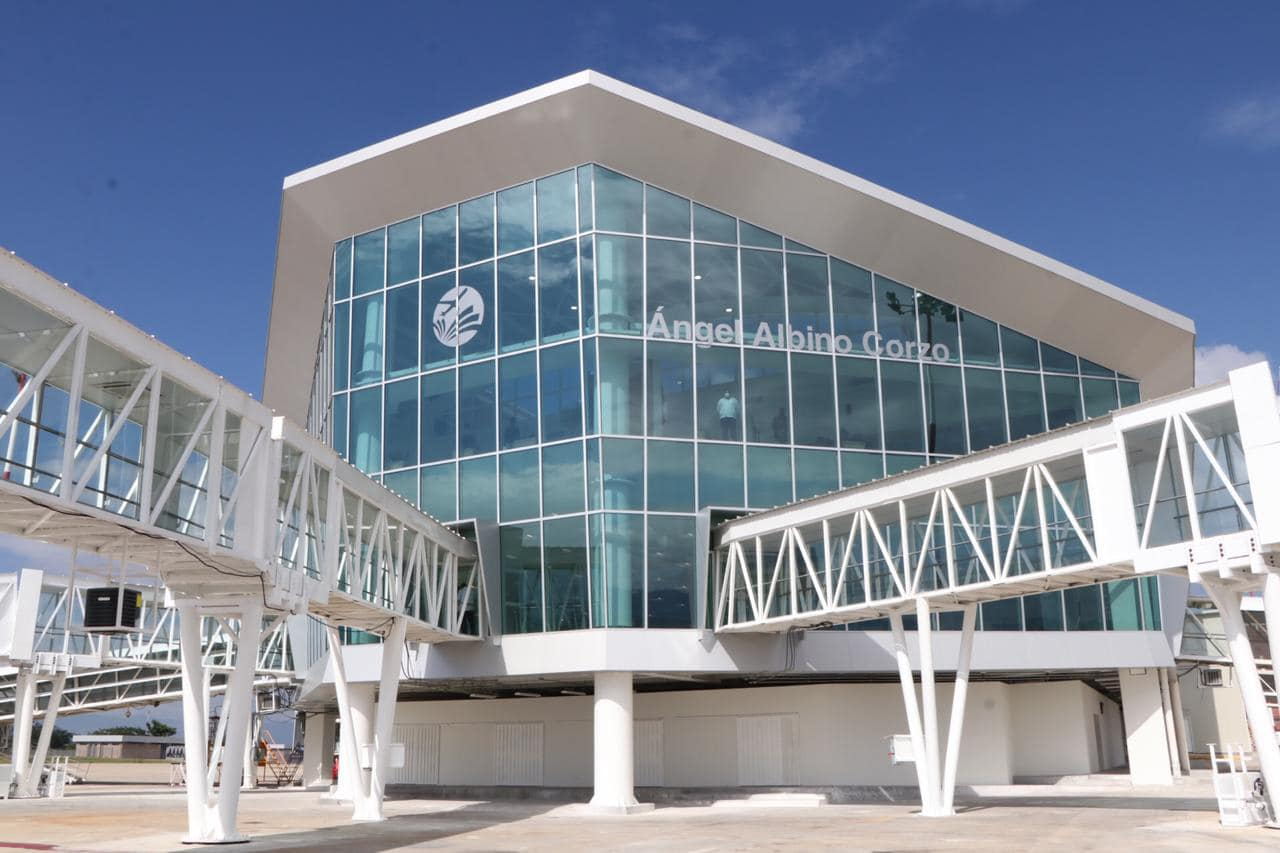
- IATA: TGZ; ICAO: MMTG

Summary
- Airport type: Public
- Owner/Operator: Grupo Aeroportuario de Chiapas
- Serves: Tuxtla Gutiérrez
- Location: Chiapa de Corzo, Chiapas, Mexico
- Time zone: CST (UTC-06:00)
- Elevation AMSL: 457 m (1,499 ft)
- Coordinates: 16°33′49″N 093°01′21″W
- Website: Chiapas Despega

Map
- Location of the airport in Chiapas TGZ (Mexico)

Runways
Direction	Length		Surface
Direction	m	ft	Surface
14/32	2,500	8,202	Concrete

Statistics (2025)
- Total passengers: 1,708,535
- Ranking in Mexico: 20th
- Source: AFAC, METAR

Tuxtla Gutiérrez International Airport (Spanish: Aeropuerto Internacional de Tuxtla Gutiérrez), officially known as Aeropuerto Internacional Ángel Albino Corzo (Ángel Albino Corzo International Airport) (IATA: TGZ, ICAO: MMTG) is an international airport situated in the municipality of Chiapa de Corzo, Chiapas. It serves air traffic for Tuxtla Gutiérrez and a significant part of the State of Chiapas, including San Cristóbal de las Casas and Comitán.

The airport is operated by Grupo Aeroportuario de Chiapas, a government-owned corporation. It replaced the Francisco Sarabia National Airport, which is now exclusively used for military purposes. According to official statistics from the Civil Aviation Federal Agency (AFAC), the airport handled 1,708,535 passengers in 2025, a 1.58% increase from previous year.

== History ==
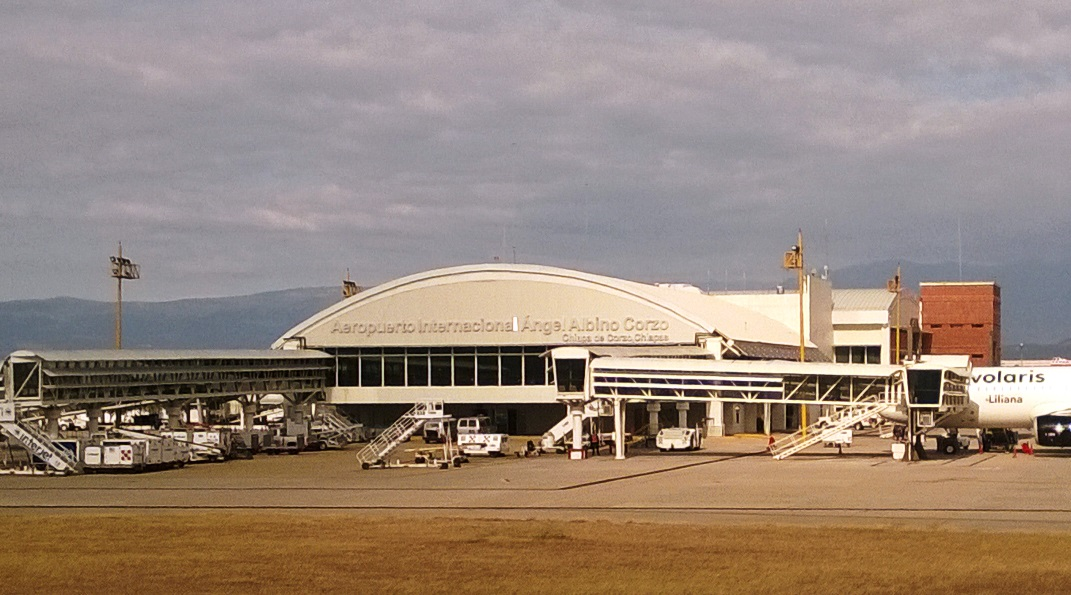
Passenger terminal in 2016

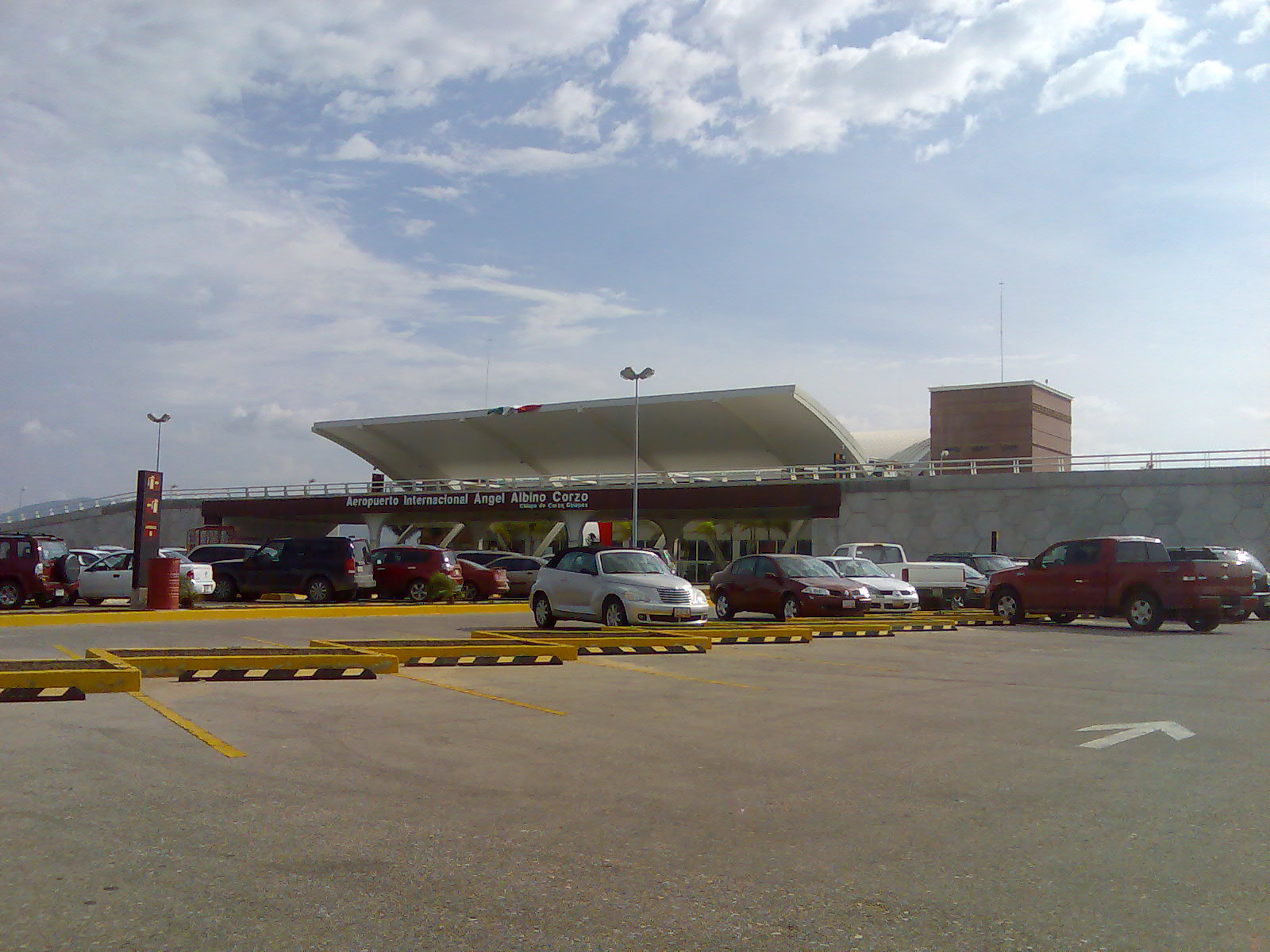
Passenger terminal in 2016

=== Earlier airports ===
The first commercial airport serving Tuxtla Gutiérrez was opened in 1957 in Terán, located to the west of the city. This small airport had limited capacity and technical constraints. In 1980, operations were relocated to the Llano San Juan airport in the neighboring municipality of Ocozocoautla. However, this new location faced challenges such as fog and wind conditions that made commercial aviation difficult. Various investments were made to address these issues, including the installation of radio systems and the construction of a second runway, but they proved unsuccessful. As a result, by the late 1990s, the old Terán Airport had to be temporarily used to carry out flight operations. The need for a third airport in Tuxtla Gutiérrez became more apparent in the early 2000s as the existing air infrastructure could not fully meet the city's growing commercial air traffic demands.

=== Initial operations ===
In 2006, the new Angel Albino Corzo Airport in Chiapa de Corzo was inaugurated. The investment for this project amounted to 825 million pesos (72.2 million dollars), with 49% of the funding coming from the federal government and 51% from the state government. With the commissioning of this new airport, the old Terán airport resumed its role as a military airbase, and the Llano San Juan airport ceased aviation operations completely.

The airport's official inauguration took place on 27 June 2006, with President Vicente Fox and the State's Governor Pablo Salazar Mendiguchía in attendance. The first commercial flight to land at the airport was Aviacsa's flight 234 from Tapachula, which used a Boeing 737-201/Adv aircraft with registration number XA-TVL. The first departure from the airport was on the same aircraft bound for Mexico City.

The airport was initially designed with the capacity to handle 350 daily operations and serve 850,000 passengers per year. It officially received its international airport status in 2008 and welcomed its first non-commercial international flight in September of the same year when the Canadian national football team arrived for a match against the Mexico national football team at the Víctor Manuel Reyna stadium.

=== Expansion ===
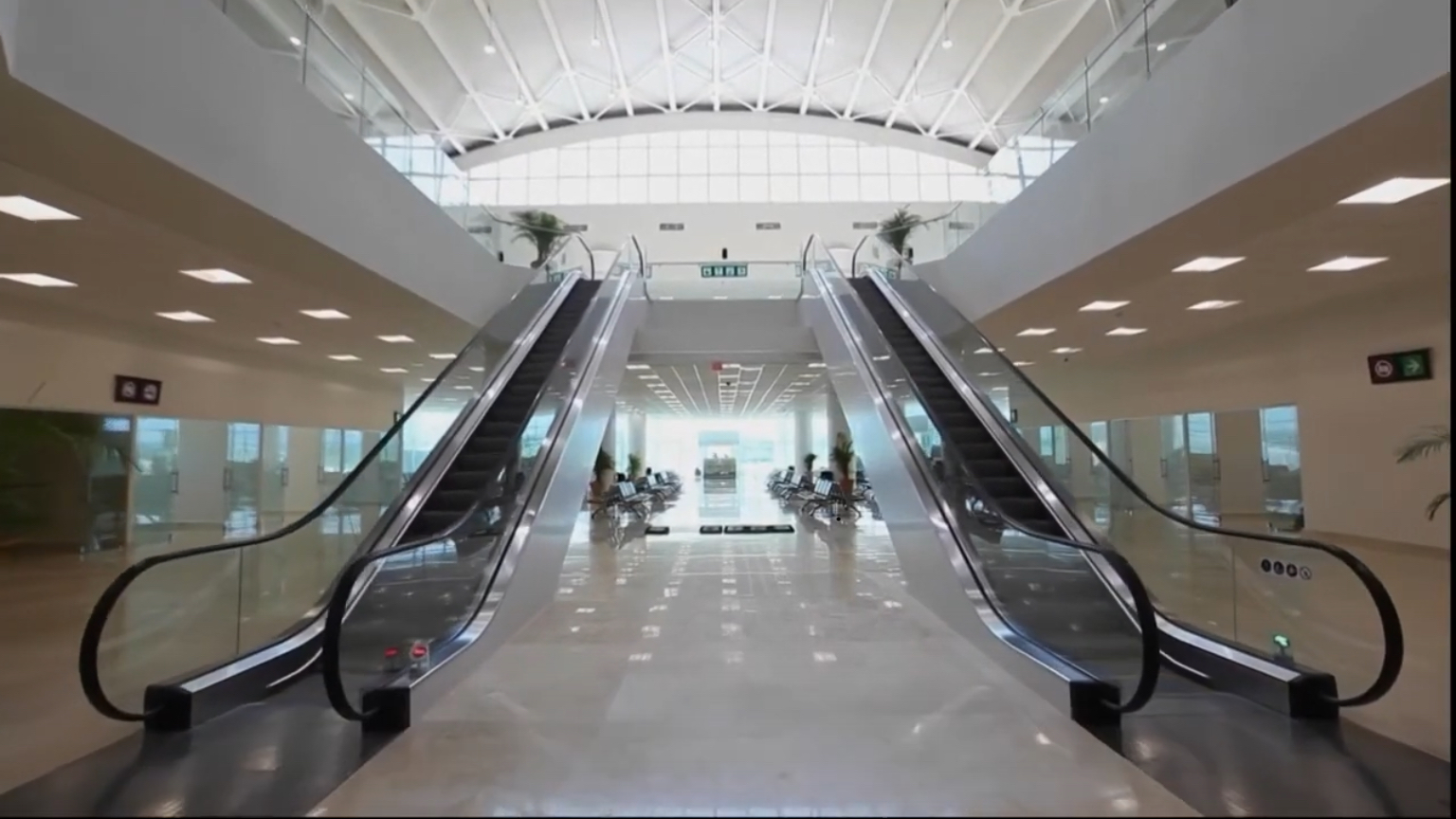
Arrivals hall

In November 2014, plans were announced to expand the airport with the aim of increasing the terminal's capacity from 80,000 to 140,000 passengers per month. In the following year, the airport achieved a significant milestone by welcoming its one-millionth passenger on board Interjet flight 2601, marking the first time in its history to reach this level of passenger traffic. The airport also made history by receiving the Mexican Air Force's Boeing 787-8 on 7 August 2017, which was the largest aircraft to land at the airport.

In 2020, the airport underwent a significant expansion, increasing its facilities by 140% to a total of 22,472 square meters. This expansion included the addition of commercial areas, four new points of contact, and a new apron.

In December 2023, the state government announced a new expansion of the facilities to handle the anticipated passenger growth. A new 6,000 square-meter wing will include a mezzanine, documentation counters, baggage documentation and reclaim area, restrooms, retail and airline space, and premises for health, immigration, and customs authorities. The expansion will also include a new short-haul bus terminal. Works are expected to be completed in 2024.

Additionally, a new air cargo terminal was inaugurated in February 2024. It has its own apron and taxiway, housing fiscal storage areas, a cold chamber, and spaces for companies specialized in air cargo. A second phase will include a 60-hectare industrial park, scheduled to be completed by July 2024.

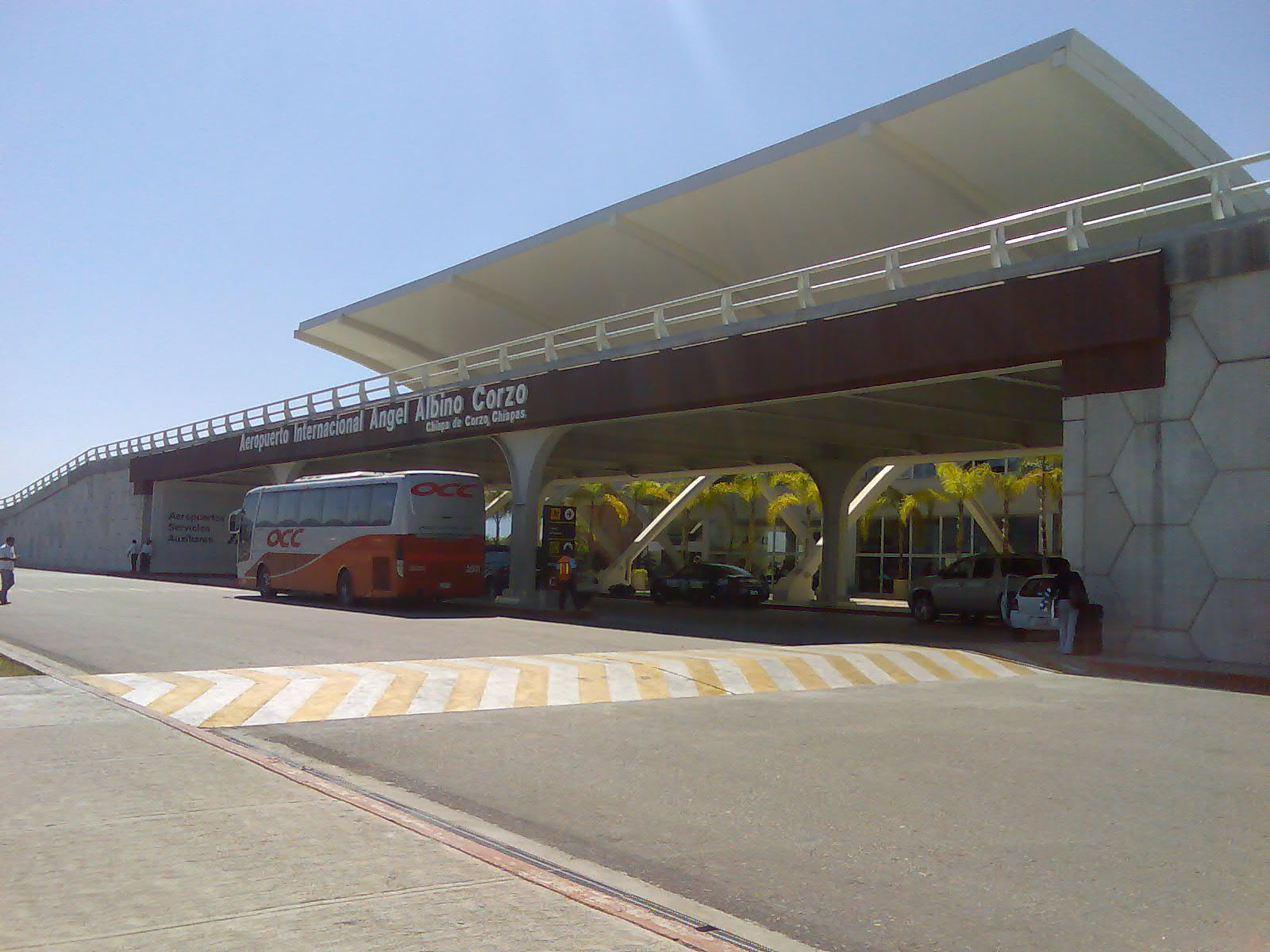
Passenger terminal arrivals

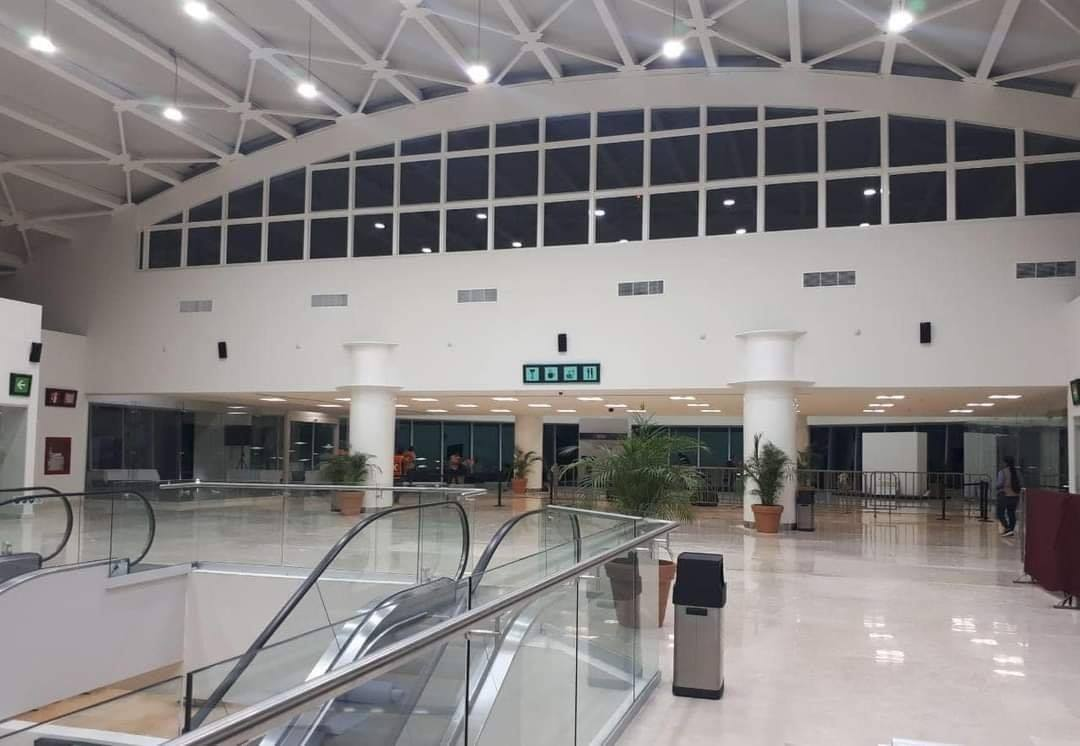
Upper level of the terminal

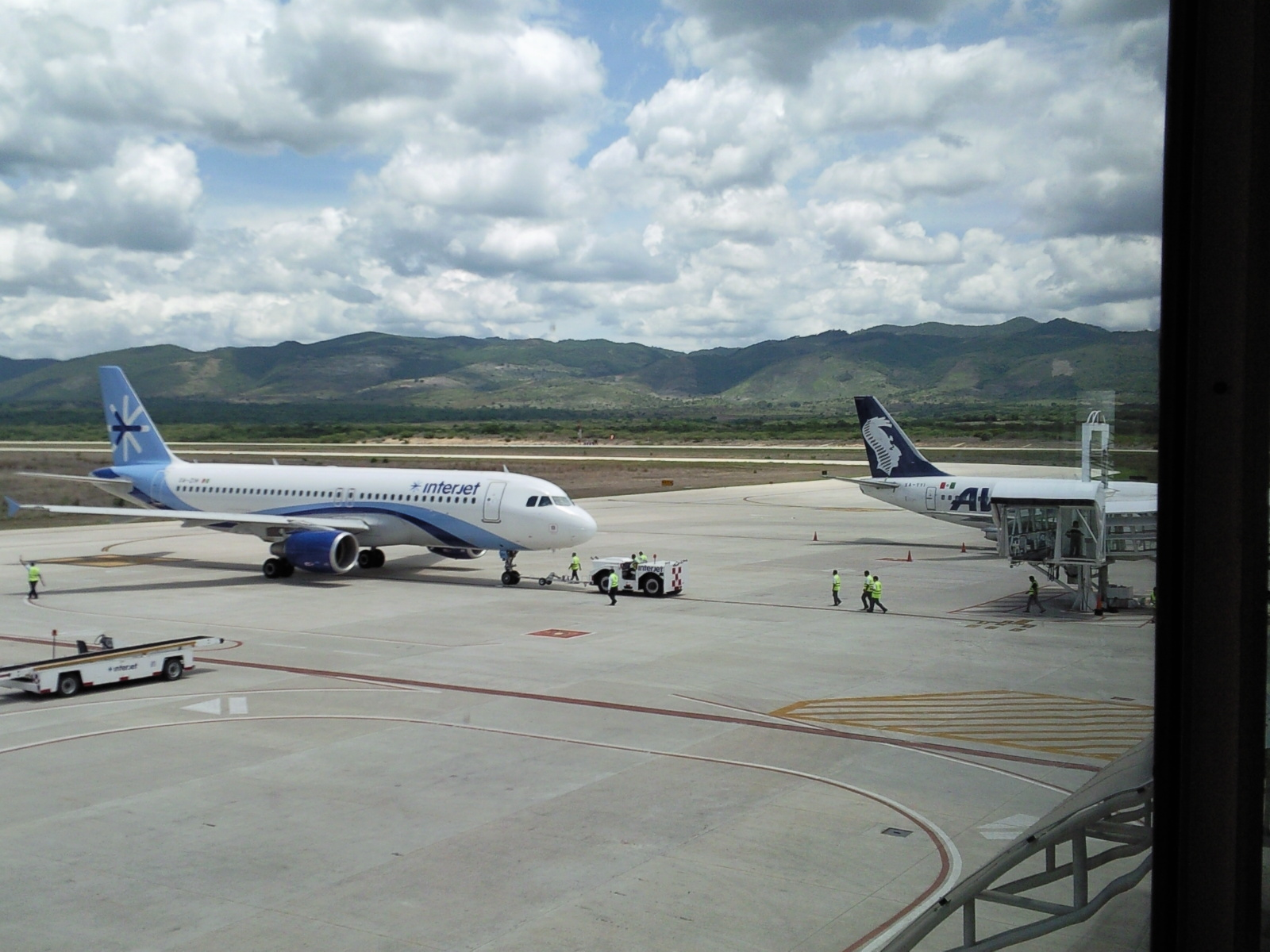
Interjet Airbus A320 at TGZ

== Route development ==
As of November 2026, the airport is connected to nine regular destinations in Mexico and one in the United States, served by five commercial airlines.

=== 2000 – 2010 ===
Initially, only two airlines operated at this airport, offering flights to Mexico City: MexicanaClick, a subsidiary of Mexicana, and Aviacsa, which faced bankruptcy in 2009. In the same year, Interjet introduced a daily flight to Toluca, while Aeroméxico briefly provided three daily flights from Mexico City. Additionally, MexicanaLink introduced flights to Oaxaca, Guadalajara, and Mérida, while Mexicana took over its route to Mexico City. After Mexicana's bankruptcy in 2010, Aeroméxico decided to expedite the launch of its operations, offering five daily frequencies, with four of them operated by Boeing 737 aircraft and one using ERJ 145 aircraft. Simultaneously, Interjet redirected its flights from Toluca to Mexico City and increased the frequency to five daily flights.

=== 2010 – 2020 ===
Between 2010 and 2013, Continental Express (later United Express) operated flights to Houston. In 2010, Viva initiated flights to Monterrey, Guadalajara, and Cancún. They expanded their services to Mexico City in 2016 and added Mérida and Puebla in 2018. In December 2012, Volaris launched the route to Mexico City, later extending to Guadalajara in 2013, Tijuana from 2013 to 2015, Monterrey from 2014 to 2017, and Cancún since 2015. TAR offered flights to Toluca and Mérida from 2014 to 2018, and Aeromar to Villahermosa, Mérida, and Oaxaca from 2016 to 2018. Calafia briefly served flights to Palenque and Puebla in 2018.

=== 2020 – 2026 ===
The regional airline Aerus launched services to Villahermosa in October 2023, but withdrew the service two months later. Volaris introduced new flights to Mexicali and León/El Bajío in July 2023, both suspended in 2024, and briefly re-introduced service to Monterrey in March 2025. Viva commenced flights to the new Felipe Ángeles airport in Mexico City in April 2024.

== Facilities ==
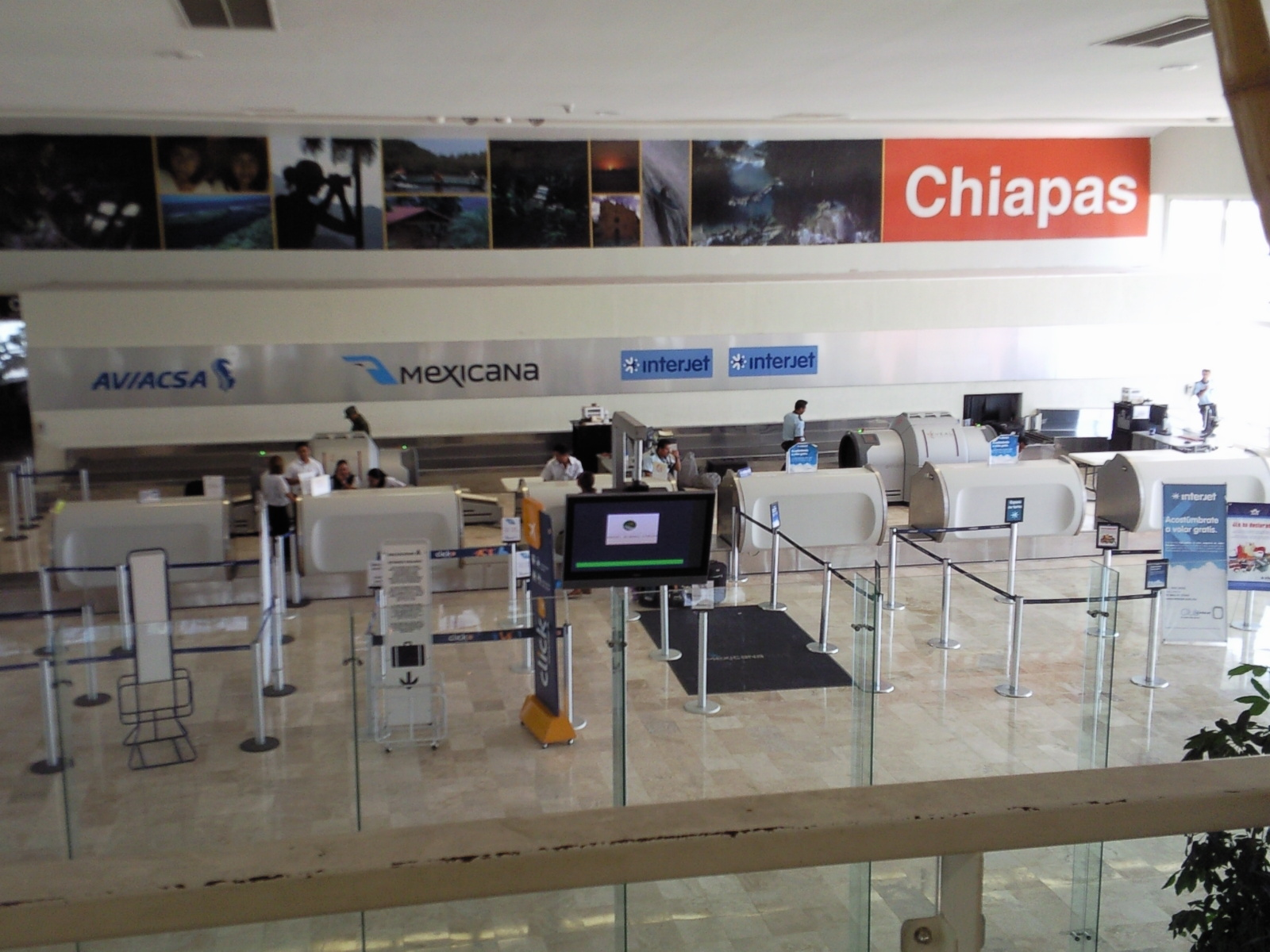
Check-in area

The airport is located at an elevation of 457 metres (1,499 ft) above mean sea level and covers an area of 740 hectares (1,800 acres). It includes a 2,500 metres (8,200 ft) concrete runway, a parallel taxiway, a passenger terminal for commercial aviation, a general aviation apron, multiple hangars, and a military base.

The passenger terminal is a two-story structure with a total area of 22,472 square metres (241,890 sq ft), designed to separate departure and arrival areas on different levels. The upper floor houses check-in counters, a security checkpoint, and a departure pier with eight gates equipped with fixed jet bridges. Two of these gates are capable of accommodating large aircraft like the Boeing 767 and the Airbus A330.

The lower level serves arriving passengers and features immigration and customs facilities for international travelers, baggage claim areas, and an arrivals hall. The airport also offers a restaurant, a VIP lounge, a café, a snack kiosk, various retail stores, ATMs, wireless internet access, and facilities designed to cater to individuals with disabilities.

== Airlines and destinations ==
=== Passenger ===
Airlines	Destinations
Aeroméxico	Mexico City–Benito Juárez
Aeroméxico Connect	Mexico City–Benito Juárez
Mexicana de Aviación	Mexico City–Felipe Ángeles
United Express	Houston–Intercontinental
Viva	Cancún, Guadalajara, Mérida, Mexico City–Benito Juárez, Mexico City–Felipe Ángeles, Monterrey, Oaxaca, Tijuana
Volaris	Cancún, Guadalajara, Mexico City–Benito Juárez, Puebla, Tijuana

=== Cargo ===
Airlines	Destinations
DHL Express Mexico	Villahermosa

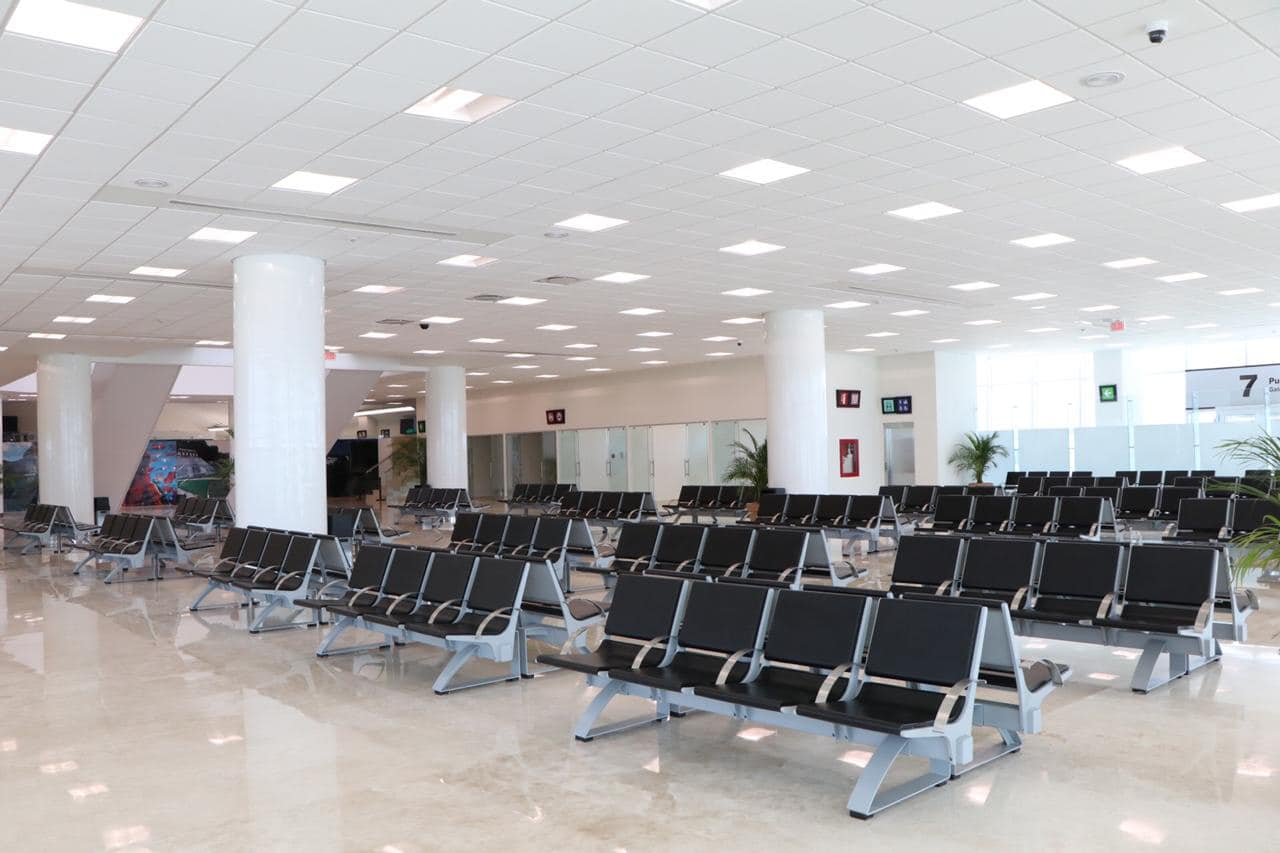
Departures concourse

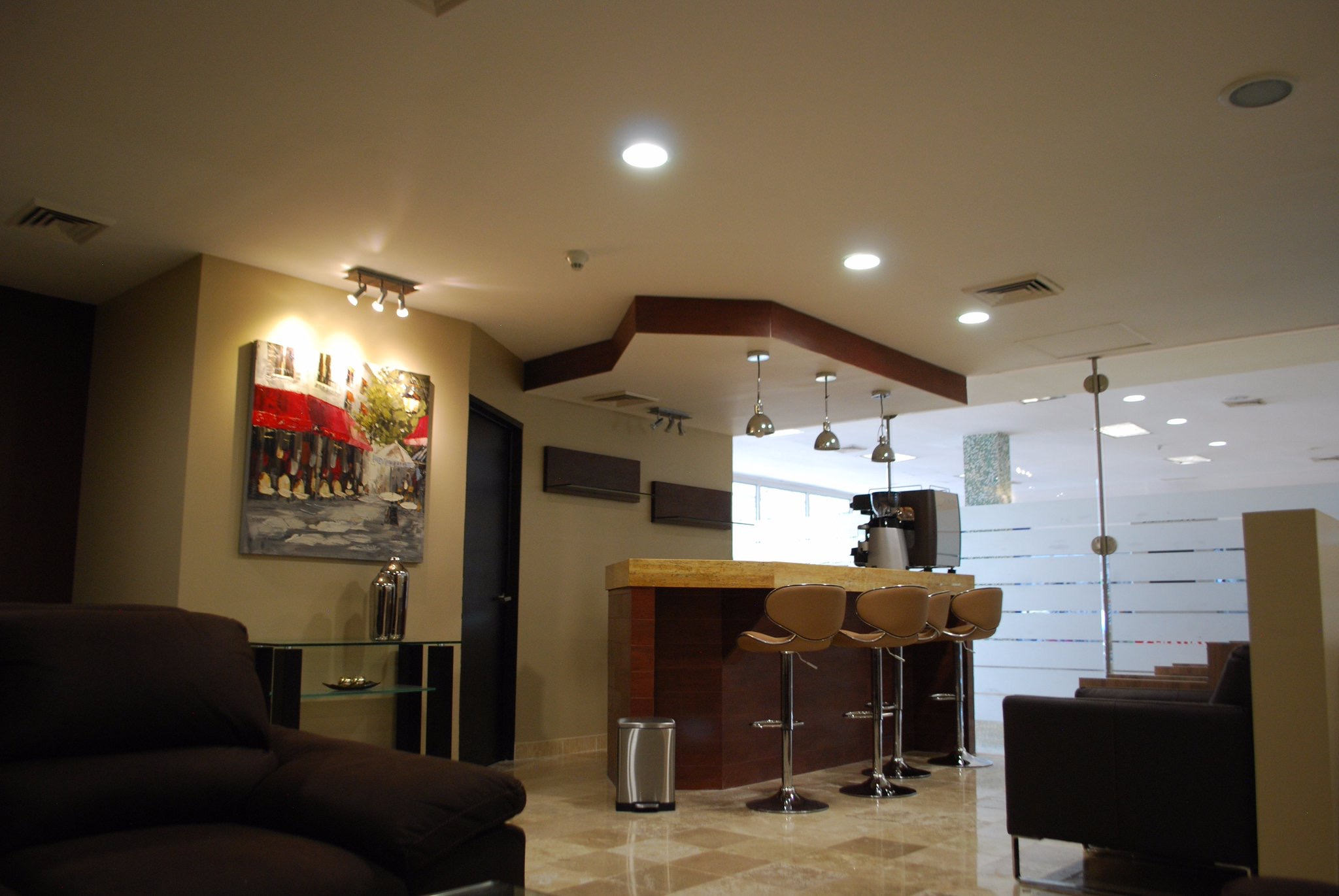
VIP lounge

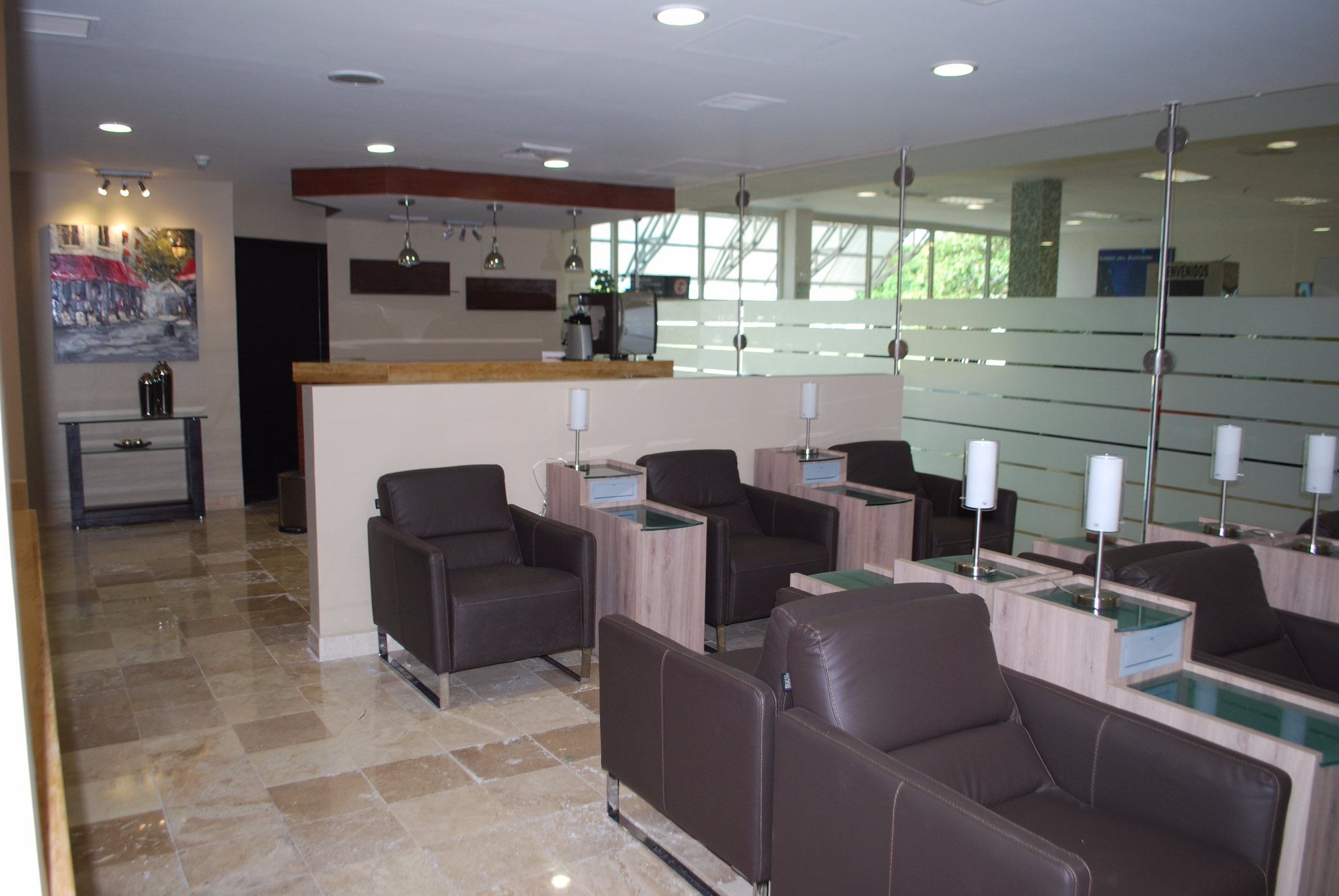
VIP lounge

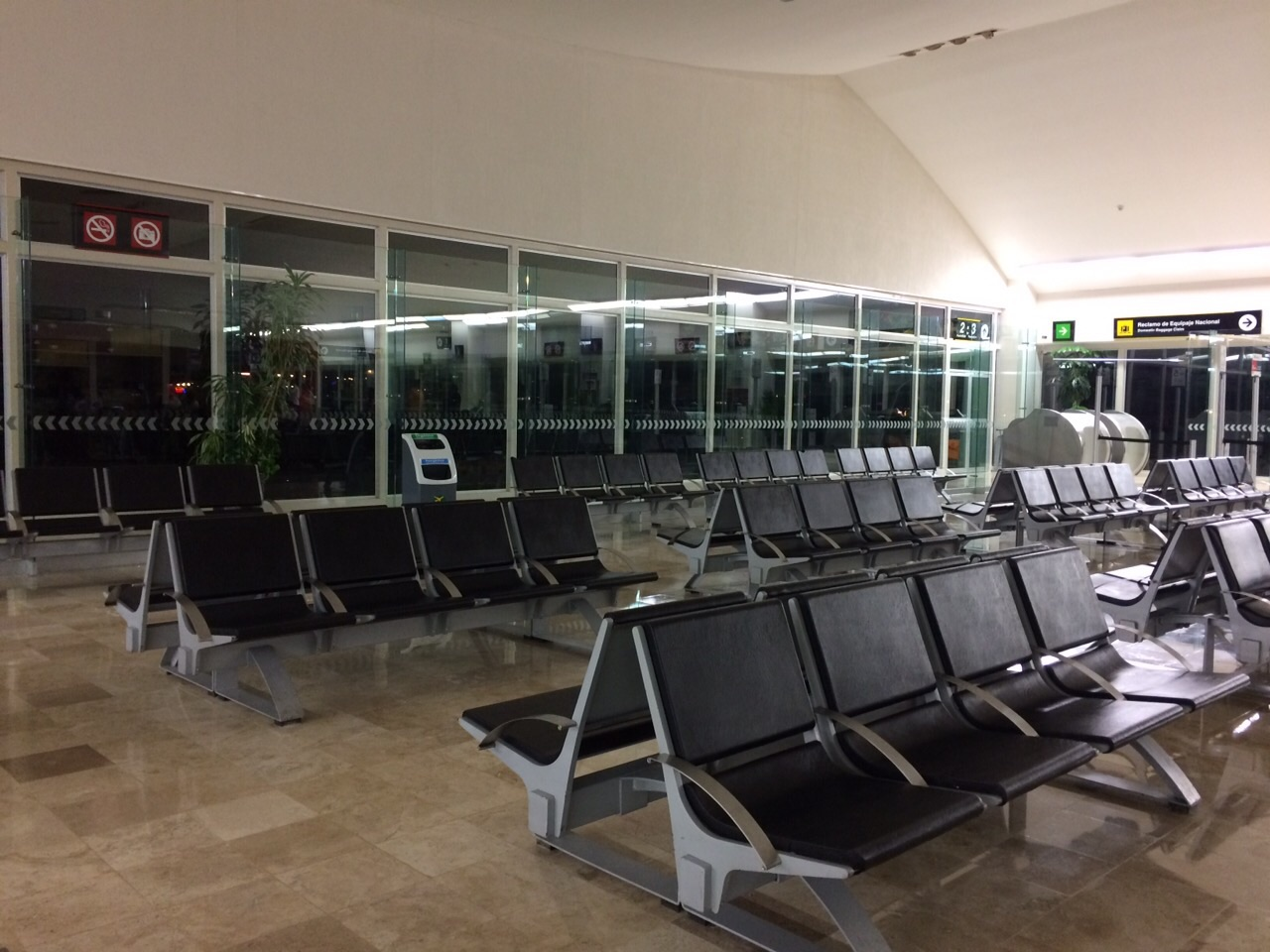
Departures concourse

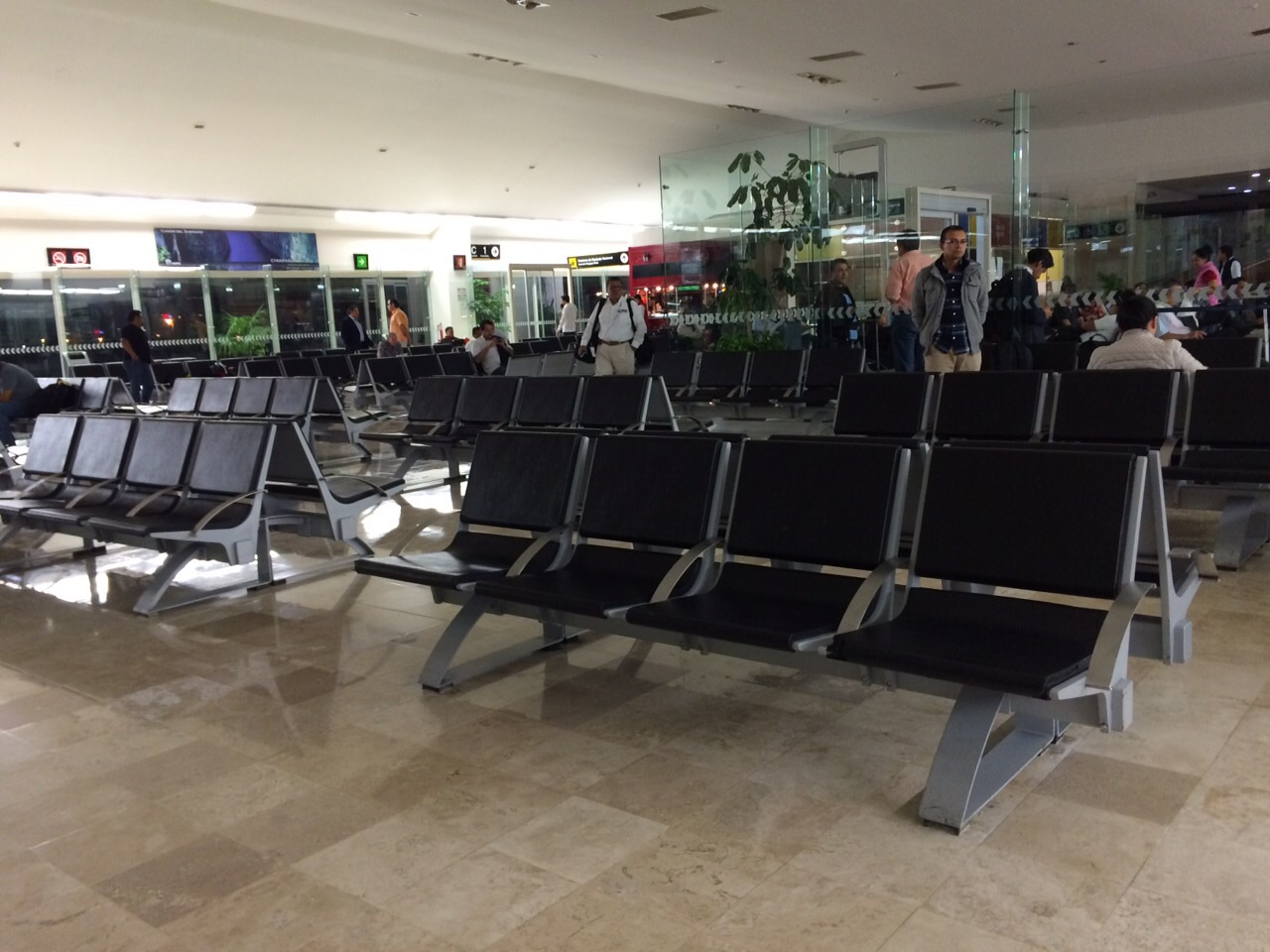
Departures concourse

=== Destinations map ===
Destinations from Tuxtla Gutiérrez International Airport
Red = Year-round destination
Blue = Future destination
Green = Seasonal destination

== Statistics ==
=== Annual traffic ===
Annual traffic at TGZ by calendar year (2006–present)
Year	Passengers	Freight (Tons)	Aircraft movements
2006	334,181	571	7,649
2007	704,903	1,312	13,756
2008	788,486	1,099	15,862
2009	663,479	1,001	12,832
2010	650,053	1,081	12,367
2011	803,611	1,046	14,182
2012	786,829	1,284	15,674
2013	855,073	901	15,930
2014	928,243	1,164	17,980
2015	1,121,332	1,132	18,067
2016	1,272,689	1,236	19,325
2017	1,342,345	1,346	20,151
2018	1,388,706	1,287	17,832
2019	1,496,152	1,343	17,768
2020	756,786	755	10,813
2021	1,186,528	885	13,774
2022	1,590,178	784	15,723
2023	1,784,010	911	16,307
2024	1,681,980	982	15,884
2025	1,708,535	1,572	18,964

=== Busiest routes ===
Busiest routes departing from TGZ (Jan–Dec 2025)
Rank	City	Passengers
1	Mexico City, Mexico City	352,339
2	Guadalajara, Jalisco	123,963
3	Cancún, Quintana Roo	116,443
4	Monterrey, Nuevo León	94,247
5	Mexico City–AIFA, State of Mexico	63,051
6	Tijuana, Baja California	48,673
7	Mérida, Yucatán	37,723

== See also ==
- List of the busiest airports in Mexico
- List of airports in Mexico
- List of airports by ICAO code: M
- List of busiest airports in North America
- List of the busiest airports in Latin America
- Transportation in Mexico
- Tourism in Mexico
- Tourism in Chiapas
- San Cristobal de las Casas
- Lacandon Jungle
