= Mérida International Airport =

Airport in Mérida, Yucatán, Mexico

Mérida International Airport Aeropuerto Internacional de Mérida
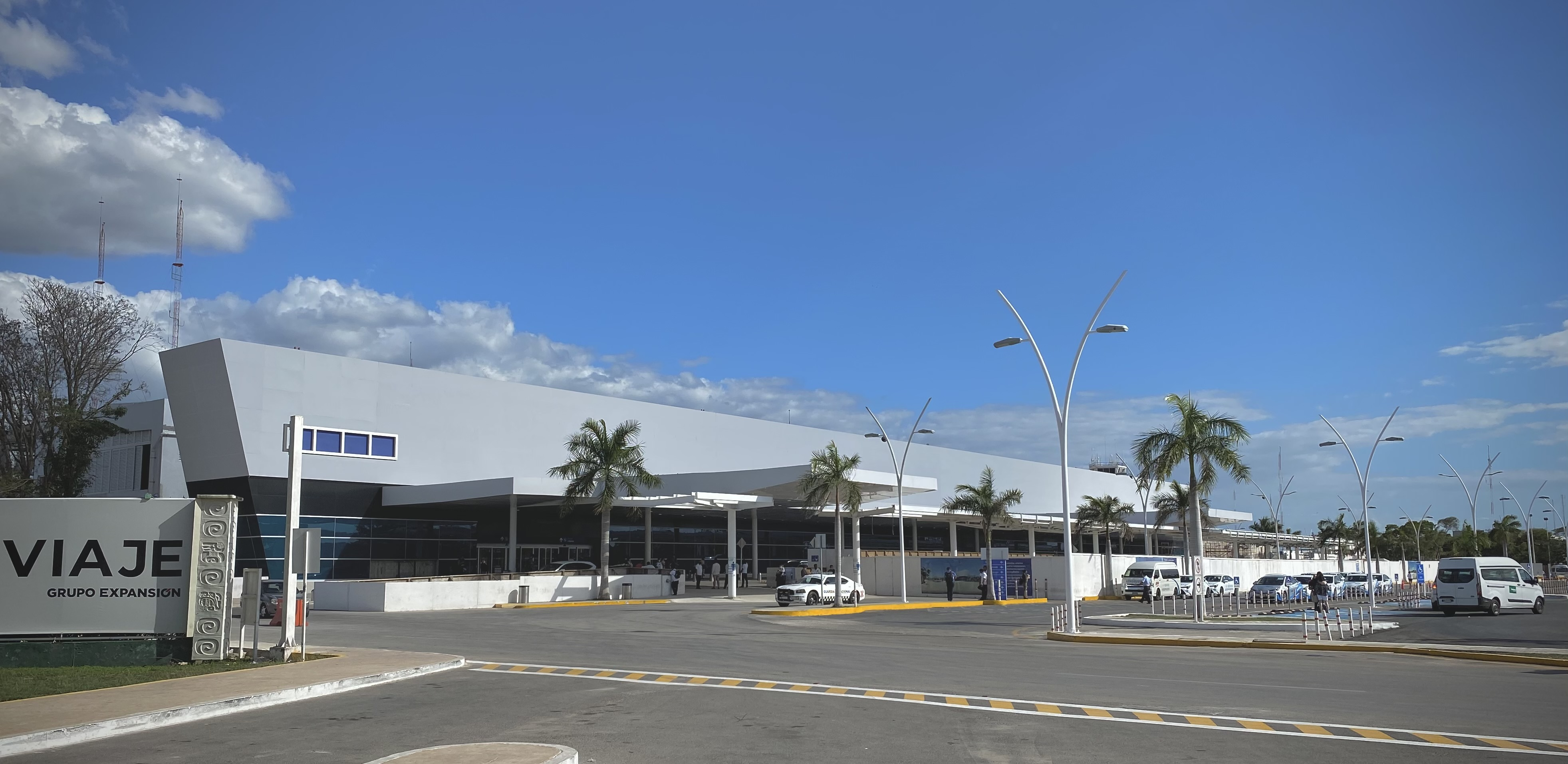
- IATA: MID; ICAO: MMMD

Summary
- Airport type: Military/Public
- Owner/Operator: Grupo Aeroportuario del Sureste
- Serves: Mérida, Yucatán, Mexico
- Built: 1929
- Time zone: CST (UTC-06:00)
- Elevation AMSL: 12 m (39 ft)
- Coordinates: 20°56′13″N 089°39′28″W
- Website: www.asur.com.mx/Contenido/Merida/shopping

Maps
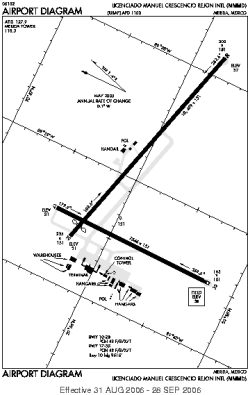

- Location of the airport in Yucatán MID (Mexico)

Runways
Direction	Length		Surface
Direction	m	ft	Surface
10/28	3,200	10,499	Asphalt
18/36	2,300	7,546	Asphalt

Statistics (2025)
- Total passengers: 3,939,692
- Ranking in Mexico: 9th
- Source: Grupo Aeroportuario del Sureste

Mérida International Airport (Spanish: Aeropuerto Internacional de Mérida), officially Aeropuerto Internacional Manuel Crescencio Rejón (Manuel Crescencio Rejón International Airport) (IATA: MID, ICAO: MMMD), is an international airport located in the Mexican city of Mérida. It serves as the primary international gateway to Mérida and the State of Yucatán, a popular tourist destination, offering flights to and from Mexico, the United States, Canada, Central America, and the Caribbean. The airport also accommodates facilities for the Mexican Airspace Navigation Services, and the Mexican Army, and supports various tourism, flight training, and general aviation activities. Additionally, it serves as a focus city for Viva.

The airport is named in honor of the jurist and politician Manuel Crescencio García Rejón, who was originally from Yucatán. It is operated by the Grupo Aeroportuario del Sureste (ASUR). The airport has become one of the fastest-growing airports in the country. In 2024, it handled 3,699,877 passengers; in 2025, the number increased to 3,939,692 passengers. It also ranked as the ninth-busiest airport in Mexico in terms of passengers, and tenth for cargo and aircraft movements.

== History ==
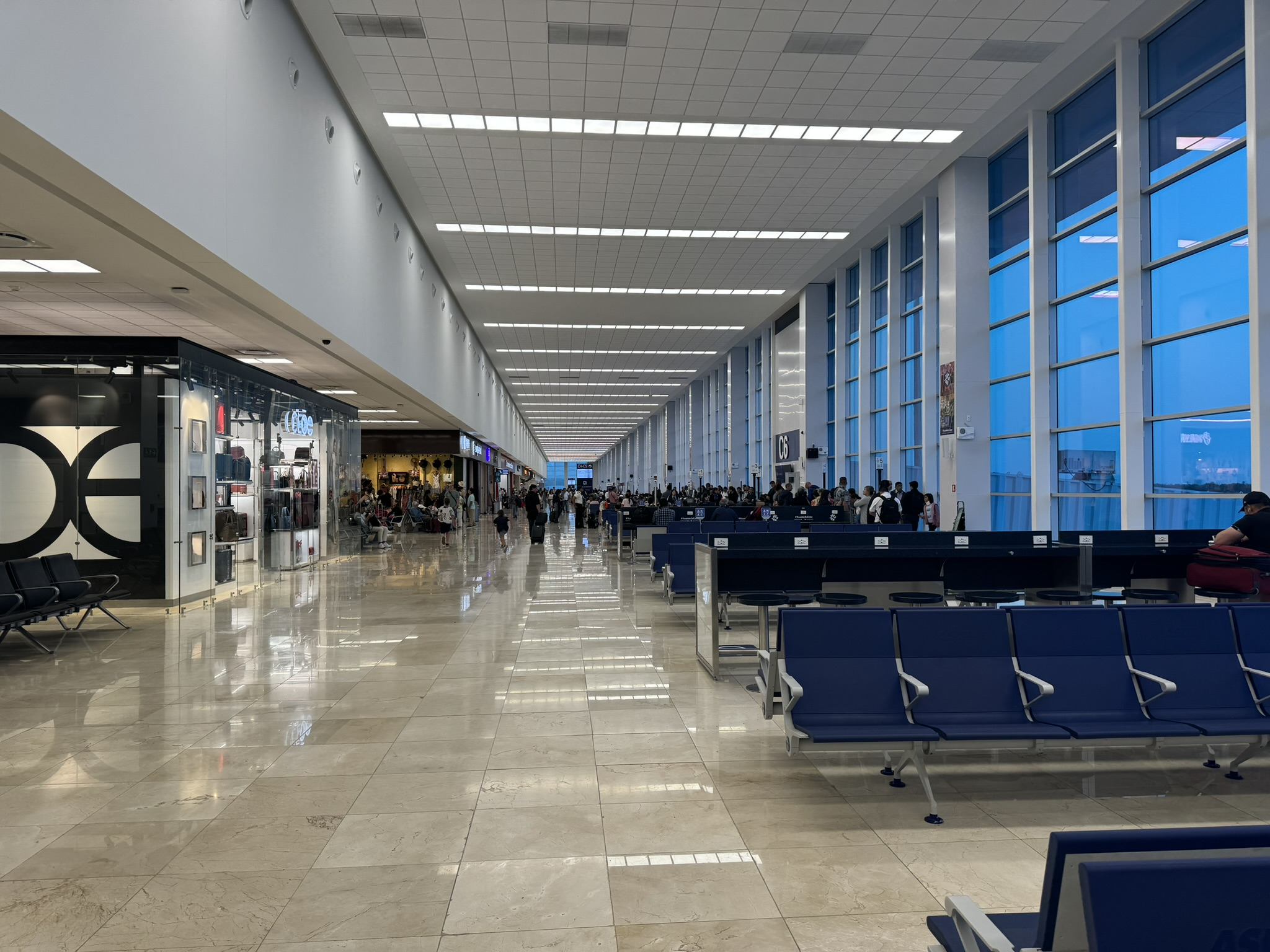
Boarding gates at the airport

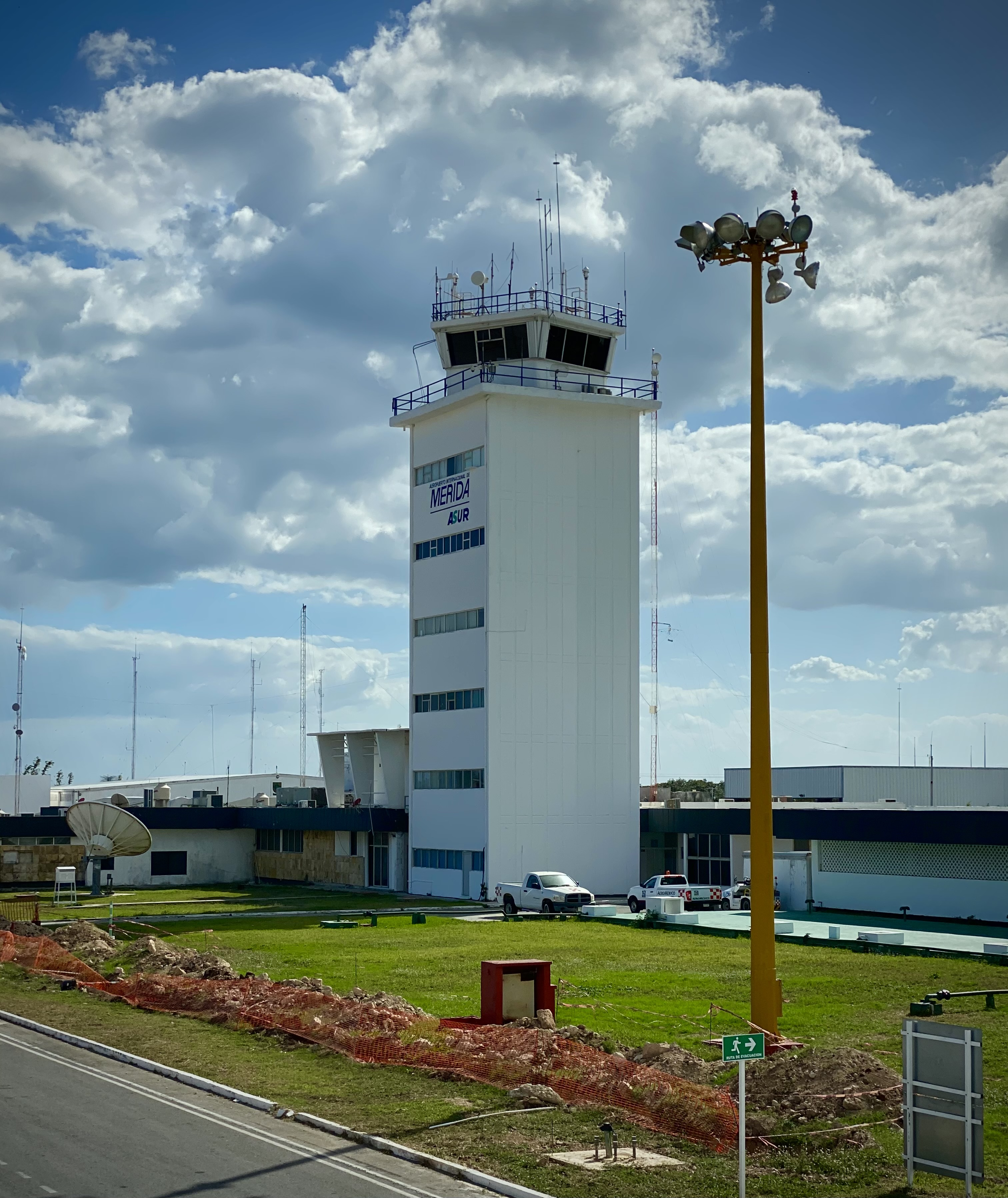
The control tower

The airport's history traces back to its inauguration in 1929 when Mexicana de Aviación introduced the Mérida-Campeche-Ciudad del Carmen-Minatitlán-Veracruz-Mexico City route, operated with a Ford Trimotor aircraft. In 1964, Mexicana de Aviación sold the airport to the Mexican government. A significant reconstruction of the airport was completed in 1968, replacing the previous facilities. During the 1960s, American Airlines provided service to the airport, making it one of the few airports, apart from Mexico City and Acapulco, to be served by a major airline.

During the 1990s, the airport became part of the Grupo Aeroportuario del Sureste, marking an important instance of a private concession within this group. This consortium encompasses various airports, including Cancún, Cozumel, Huatulco, Mérida, Minatitlán, Oaxaca, Tapachula, Villahermosa, and Veracruz. Throughout the years, it underwent several modifications and modernizations, notably in 1999, 2011, and 2021. The airport has welcomed distinguished political and religious figures, such as Pope John Paul II, as well as U.S. Presidents Bill Clinton and George W. Bush, and President of China, Xi Jinping.

Throughout its history, the airport has been serviced by a range of airlines, including Aero California, Aeromar, Aviateca, Blue Panorama Airlines, Cubana, Delta, Interjet, Mexicana, Neos, Pan Am, Lufthansa, TAR, and Tropic Air. From 1972 to 2005, it functioned as the primary hub for Aerocaribe and Aerocozumel, both subsidiaries of the former Mexicana. Between 1992 and 1995 it served as a hub for Aviacsa, and more recently, it was home to the regional airline Mayair.

== Facilities ==
The airport is situated in the Mérida urban area, less than 5 kilometres (3.1 mi) southwest of the city centre, at an elevation of 12 metres (39 ft) above sea level. It features two runways: Runway 10/28, which is 3,200 metres (10,500 ft) long, and Runway 18/36, which spans 2,300 metres (7,500 ft). Adjacent to the terminal, there is a commercial aviation apron capable of accommodating up to 11 narrow-body aircraft or a combination of three narrow-body and three wide-body aircraft. Additionally, a remote stand is available for two narrow-body aircraft. The airport has the capacity to service airplanes as large as Boeing 747s and 777s, although most daily flights involve smaller aircraft, with the most common being the Boeing 737 and Airbus A320. The airport can handle up to 30 operations per hour and operates around the clock.

=== Passenger terminal ===
The passenger terminal is a two-story structure. The ground floor comprises the main entrance, a check-in area, and the arrivals section, which includes customs and immigration facilities, along with baggage claim services. Additionally, car rental services, taxi stands, snack bars, and souvenir shops are available. The upper terminal floor hosts a security checkpoint and departure area, featuring a 260 metres (850 ft) long departures concourse. Within this section, there are restaurants, food stands, duty-free shops, VIP lounges, and eleven gates (C1-11), with seven of them equipped with jet bridges.

In the vicinity of the terminal, various facilities are located, including civil aviation hangars, cargo and logistics companies, and cargo services. There is also a dedicated general aviation terminal that supports a range of activities, such as tourism, flight training, executive aviation, and general aviation.

=== Other facilities ===
The airport is home to the Mérida Area Control Center (ACC), one of four such centers in Mexico, alongside the Mexico City ACC, Monterrey ACC, and Mazatlán ACC. Operated by the Mexican Airspace Navigation Services (Spanish: Servicios a la Navegación en el Espacio Aéreo Mexicano), Mérida ACC provides air traffic control services for aircraft operating within the Mérida Flight Data Region (FDRG), which encompasses the southeastern region of Mexico. This region shares its boundaries with six other Area Control Centers. To the west, it borders the Monterrey ACC and Mexico ACC, while to the north, it shares borders with the Houston ARTCC (KZHU), and to the east and south, it connects with the Havana ACC (MUFH) and the Central American ACC (MHTG), respectively.

Air Force Base No. 8 (Spanish: Base Aérea Militar No. 8 Mérida, Yucatán) (BAM-8) is located on the airport grounds, north of Runway 10/28. It serves as the home for Air Squadron 114, responsible for operating Cessna 182 aircraft. BAM-8 features two aprons, one spanning 11,775 square metres (126,750 sq ft) and another covering 4,000 square metres (43,000 sq ft). In addition to these, it includes three hangars and various other facilities for accommodating Air Force personnel.

== Airlines and destinations ==
=== Passenger ===
Airlines	Destinations
Aeroméxico	Mexico City–Benito Juárez
Aeroméxico Connect	Mexico City–Benito Juárez, Mexico City–Felipe Ángeles
Aerus	Villahermosa
Air Canada	Seasonal: Toronto–Pearson
American Airlines	Miami; Seasonal: Dallas/Fort Worth
American Eagle	Seasonal: Dallas/Fort Worth
Mexicana de Aviación	Mexico City–Felipe Ángeles
TAG Airlines	Flores, Guatemala City
United Airlines	Houston–Intercontinental
Viva	Guadalajara, Havana, León/El Bajío, Mexico City–Benito Juárez, Mexico City–Felipe Ángeles, Miami, Monterrey, Orlando, Puebla, Querétaro, Tijuana, Toluca/Mexico City, Tuxtla Gutiérrez, Veracruz, Villahermosa; Seasonal: Los Angeles
Volaris	Guadalajara, Mexico City–Benito Juárez, Mexico City–Felipe Ángeles, Monterrey, Oaxaca, Tijuana
WestJet	Seasonal: Calgary (begins 17 December 2026), Toronto–Pearson

=== Destinations map ===
Domestic destinations from Mérida International Airport
Red = Year-round destination
Blue = Future destination
Green = Seasonal destination
International destinations from Mérida International Airport
Red = Year-round destination
Blue = Future destination
Green = Seasonal destination

== Statistics ==
=== Annual Traffic ===
Passenger statistics at Mérida International Airport
Year	Total Passengers	change %
2000	903,250	Steady
2001	919,365	▲1.8%
2002	1,061,670	▲5.4%
2003	899,620	▼8.0%
2004	931,130	▲3.5%
2005	1,021,902	▲9.7%
2006	1,007,210	▼1.4%
2007	1,267,625	▲25.8%
2008	1,280,832	▲1.0%
2009	1,058,510	▼21.0%
2010	1,135,418	▲7.9%
2011	1,225,593	▲5.0%
2012	1,233,738	▲0.6%
2013	1,316,242	▲6.6%
2014	1,436,959	▲9.7%
2015	1,663,616	▲15.7%
2016	1,944,782	▲16.9%
2017	2,148,484	▲10.5%
2018	2,451,616	▲14.11%
2019	2,790,649	▲13.8%
2020	1,297,308	▼53.5%
2021	2,079,503	▲60.3%
2022	3,079,618	▲48.1%
2023	3,674,103	▲19.3%
2024	3,716,588	▲1.2%
2025	3,939,692	▲3.5%

=== Busiest routes ===
Busiest domestic routes from MID (Jan–Dec 2025)
Rank	Airport	Passengers
1	Mexico City, Mexico City	790,213
2	Mexico City-AIFA, State of Mexico	269,164
3	Monterrey, Nuevo León	230,836
4	Guadalajara, Jalisco	158,077
5	Toluca, State of Mexico	71,470
6	Veracruz, Veracruz	54,558
7	Querétaro, Querétaro	41,510
8	Tuxtla Gutiérrez, Chiapas	38,052
9	Villahermosa, Tabasco	30,707
10	Puebla, Puebla	30,062

Busiest international routes from MID (Jan–Dec 2025)
Rank	Airport	Passengers
1	Miami, United States	52,956
2	Houston–Intercontinental, United States	47,584
3	Dallas/Fort-Worth, United States	24,096
4	Orlando, United States	14,937
5	Havana, Cuba	6,469
6	Toronto-Pearson, Canada	6,369
7	Guatemala City, Guatemala	1,954
8	Los Angeles, United States	694

== Accidents and incidents ==
- On 9 April 1958, a Vickers Viscount of Cubana de Aviación was hijacked en route from José Martí International Airport, Havana, to Santa Clara Airport. The aircraft landed at Mérida-Rejón Airport, Mexico, where the hijack ended.
- On 1 June 2023, an Aeromexico Boeing 737-8JP declared a Squawk 7700, a regulation for emergency on an aircraft. While en route to Mexico City, the aircraft, registered XA-PPP diverted back to Merida International Airport. The aircraft suffered an engine loss and safely landed with no deaths to the people on board.

== See also ==
- List of the busiest airports in Mexico
- List of airports in Mexico
- List of airports by ICAO code: M
- List of busiest airports in North America
- List of the busiest airports in Latin America
- Transportation in Mexico
- Tourism in Mexico
- Grupo Aeroportuario Centro Norte
- Area control center
- List of area control centers
- Flight information region
- List of Mexican military installations
- Mexican Air Force
