= Aviacsa =

Mexican low-cost airline

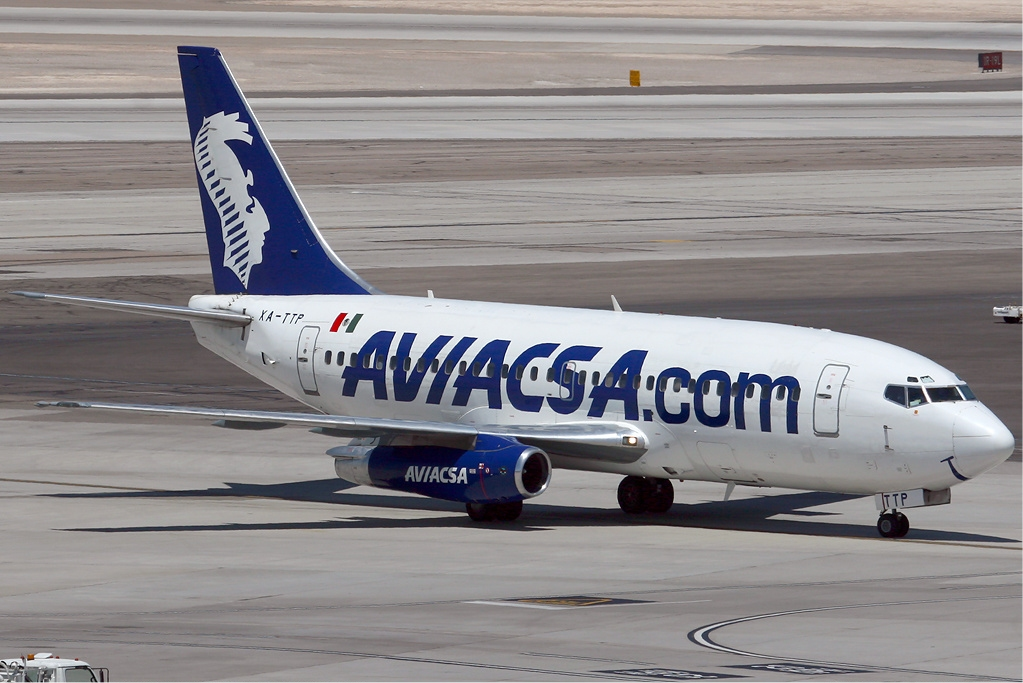
IATA	ICAO	Call sign
6A	CHP	AVIACSA
- Founded: May 5, 1990; 36 years ago
- Ceased operations: May 4, 2011; 15 years ago
- Hubs: Mexico City International Airport
- Frequent-flyer program: Aviacpass
- Fleet size: 26
- Destinations: 8
- Parent company: Aeroexo, SA
- Headquarters: Mexico City International Airport, Mexico City, Mexico
- Key people: Andrés Fabre (CEO)
- Website: Aviacsa.com (archived)

Consorcio Aviaxsa, S.A. de C.V., doing business as Aviacsa, was a low-cost airline of Mexico, founded in 1990. The airline operated domestic services until the airline's grounding in 2011, radiating from major hubs at Monterrey, Mexico City, and Guadalajara, and international service to Las Vegas in the United States.

According to Mexico's Secretary of Communications and Transportation, as of September 2008, Aviacsa ranked as the seventh-largest Mexican airline in domestic and international flights, down from the third-largest at the end of 2007.

In June and July 2009, the Mexican government repeatedly suspended Aviacsa's operations due to safety issues and unpaid fees. Aviacsa ceased operations on May 4, 2011.

== History ==
=== Regional era (1990–1994) ===
Aviacsa was established on May 5, 1990, as a flag carrier airline by the government of the Mexican state of Chiapas, in order to fulfill the transportation needs of the fast-growing communities located in that state. Less than a week later, on May 10, Aviacsa Flight 100 killed all four crew members and 20 of the 36 passengers, from a failed landing at Tuxtla Gutiérrez Airport that investigators attributed to the crew's lack of experience and coordination.

On September 20, 1990, Aviacsa operated its first flight using an 89-seat British Aerospace 146 between Mexico City and the cities of Tapachula and Tuxtla Gutiérrez, both located in the state of Chiapas. By the end of the year, the airline received a second BAe 146 and initiated service from the two towns in Chiapas to Villahermosa, Mérida, Oaxaca, Chetumal, and Cancún.

In 1991, Aviacsa exchanged its BAe 146s for four 108-seat Fokker 100 aircraft. With these new planes, the airline was able to initiate flights from Monterrey to Mérida and Cancún, as well as service from Mexico City to Mérida and Villahermosa. Between 1992 and 1995, the main operation hubs were Mérida and Tuxtla Gutiérrez.

=== Flagship era (1994–2007) ===
In 1994, Aviacsa exchanged its fleet of Fokker 100s for four 164-seat Boeing 727-200s. The airline also launched a charter division, temporarily utilizing the Fokker 100s. The company was privatized and sold to Aeroexo, a charter company based in Monterrey.

In 1995, Aviacsa changed its livery to a white plane, blue stripes, gray bottom, and the iconic smile painted on the nose of the airplanes. Aviacsa was the second airline to use a smile; the first was Pacific Southwest Airlines.

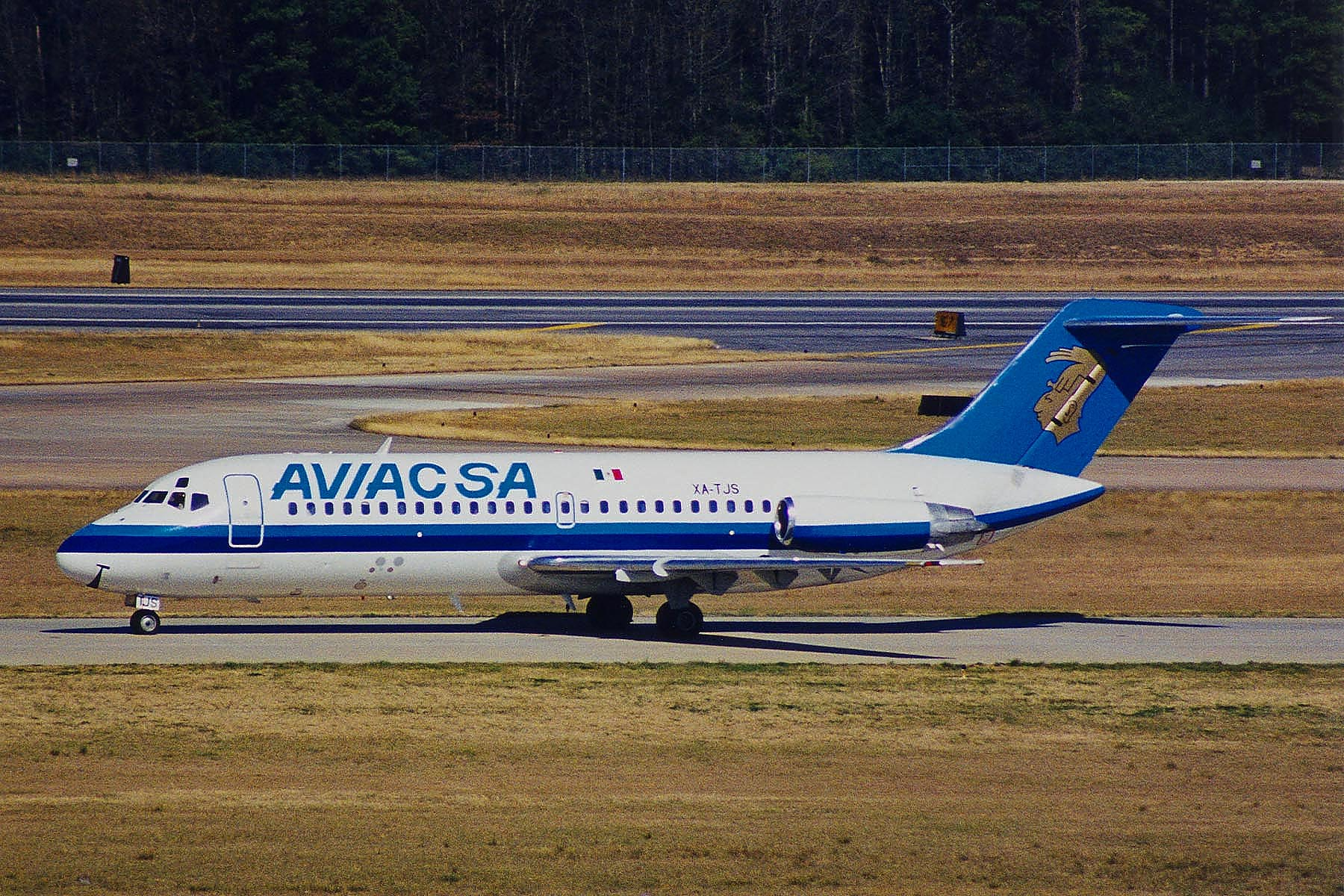

In 1997, Aviacsa leased three Douglas DC-9-15s and increased flight frequencies. The company announced that its three years of charter operations had successfully carried out 1,020 charter flights to cities within Mexico, the United States, the Caribbean, Central America, and South America. Aviacsa and Grupo TACA announced a partnership in 1998.

In December 1999, Aviacsa added four Boeing 737-200s to its fleet.

Between 2000 and 2005, Aviacsa introduced new flights and destinations throughout Mexico, as well as scheduled service to five US cities. In 2000, the company changed its image, slogan and corporate logo. Between 2001 and 2004, the airline began leasing and purchasing used 737-200s to help increase route capabilities.

Aviacsa launched its online ticket shopping webpage in 2005, and introduced Boeing 737-300s to replace its 727s in 2006.

=== Low-cost era (2007–2009) ===
On January 1, 2007, seriously affected by competition from the recently launched Interjet, VivaAerobus and Volaris, Aviacsa began marketing as a low-cost airline, ending service to Chicago, Houston, Los Angeles and Miami, focusing instead on the Mexican domestic market.

=== Suspension era (2009–2011) ===
On June 3, 2009, the Mexican government grounded 25 of Aviacsa's 26 aircraft, for maintenance irregularities. The airline appealed this ruling citing, among other things, reports from the FAA and third-party inspectors, which had deemed the airline to be safe.

On July 6, 2009, the Mexican government again grounded the airline, for the third time in five weeks, over claims that the airline owed over 292 million pesos (about $22 million) in fees for use of Mexican airspace. Aviacsa officials accused the government of trying to put them out of business in response to pressure from other Mexican airlines. Some of Aviacsa's routes are now being served by Aeromexico Connect.

Although Aviacsa was slated to resume operations, on May 4, 2011, it announced that ticket sales would not continue, casting doubt on the airline's future.

== Corporate affairs ==
=== Headquarters ===
The head office was previously located in García, Nuevo León, Mexico, and later in Mexico City International Airport. The company also had a U.S. office in Houston.

=== Livery ===
Aviacsa, since its launch in 1990, featured the stylized head of Pakal — emperor of the Mayan city-state of Palenque — as its corporate image. The logo was modernized several times throughout the airline's history. Aviacsa aircraft also featured a smile on the lower front of the plane.

=== Slogans ===
- 1991–1998: "Los caminos del cielo maya" (The skyways of the Maya)
- 1998–1999: "Aviacsa ... para todos" (Aviacsa ... for all)
- 2000–2009: "La línea aérea de Mexico" (The airline of Mexico)
- 2009–2011: "El cielo vuelve a sonreír" (The sky smiles again)

== See also ==
- List of defunct airlines of Mexico
