= List of defunct airlines of Mexico =

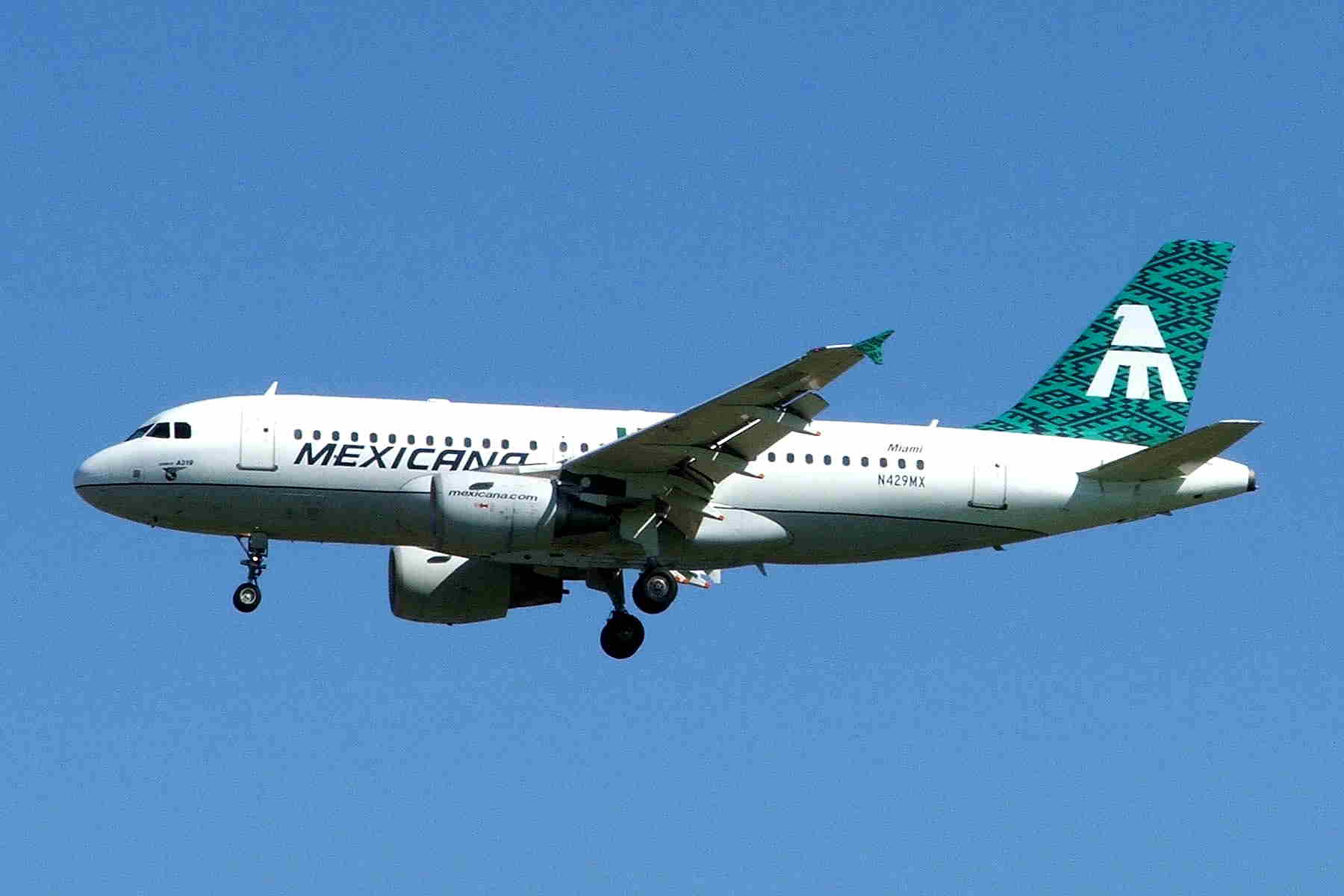
Mexicana Airbus A319-112

This is a list of defunct airlines in Mexico, categorized by ICAO and IATA codes and callsigns, based on data as of 2025. A separate list covers active airlines of Mexico.

| Airline | Image | IATA | ICAO | Callsign | Commenced operations | Ceased operations | Notes |
|---|---|---|---|---|---|---|---|
| Aero California | | JR | SER | AEROCALIFORNIA | 1960 | 2008 | Destinations and assets acquired by Interjet |
| Aero Cuahonte | | | CUA | AEROCUAHONTE | 1957 | 2007 | |
| Aero Ejecutivo | | SX | AJO | AEROEXO | 1975 | 1994 | Renamed to Aeroexo |
| Aero Eslava | | | | AEROESLAVA | 1996 | 1996 | |
| Aero Express Intercontinental | | | XSS | | 2002 | 2003 | |
| Aero Feliz | | XA | HDQ | AERO FELIZ | 1990 | 1992 | |
| Aero Fiesta Mexicana | | | FIT | | 1994 | 1994 | |
| Aero Jet Express | | | AJE | JET EXPRESS | 2005 | 2006 | |
| Aero León | | | | | 1978 | 1983 | |
| Aero Libertad | | OQ | | | 1988 | 1992 | |
| Aero Owen | | | OWN | OWEN | 2014 | 2017 | Unknown ceasing operations |
| Aero Sudpacífico | | | SDP | SUDPACIFIC | 1990 | 1996 | |
| Aerocancun | | RE | ACU | AEROCANCUN | 1988 | 1996 | Oasis Airlines (owner) went bankrupt |
| Aerocaribe | | QA | CBE | AEROCARIBE | 1975 | 2005 | Rebranded as MexicanaClick |
| AeroCedros | | | | | 1992 | 2003 | |
| Aerocomponentes Internacionales | | | CPE | | 1945 | 2006 | |
| Aerocozumel | | AZ | AZM | | 1978 | 2002 | Merged with Aerocaribe |
| Aeroexo | | SX | AJO | AEROEXO | 1993 | 2000 | Merged into Aviacsa |
| Aerolinair | | | ERN | BLUE HAWK | 2002 | 2004 | |
| Aerolíneas Bonanza | | | BNZ | | 1972 | 1975 | Merged into Aerocaribe |
| Aerolíneas Internacionales | | N2 | LNT | LINEAINT | 1994 | 2003 | |
| Aerolitoral | | 5D | SLI | | 1989 | 2007 | Rebranded as Aeroméxico Connect |
| Aeromar | | VW | TAO | AEROMAR | 1987 | 2023 | Went bankrupt, 26 million pesos in debt |
| Aeroméxico Contigo | | CG | AMC | CONTIGO | 2014 | 2016 | Subsidiary of Aeroméxico |
| Aeroméxico Express | | 7D | ATKL | EXPRESS | 2014 | 2016 | Subsidiary of Aeroméxico and Aeromar |
| Aeroméxico Travel | | AM | ATE | TRAVEL | 2008 | 2011 | |
| Aeromexpress | | QO | MPX | AEROMEXPRESS | 1990 | 2004 | Merged into AeroMéxico Cargo |
| Aeromonterrey | | 7M | MOT | | 1991 | 1995 | Fleet transferred to Aeroperú |
| Aeronaves de México | | AM | AMX | | 1934 | 1988 | Rebranded as Aerovias de Mexico and currently operates as Aeromexico |
| AeroPacifico | | | APF | | 1989 | 1992 | |
| Aeropostal Cargo de México | | | PCG | POSTAL CARGO | 2001 | 2010 | Rebranded as PCG de México |
| Aeroservicios de California | | | | | 1966 | 1978 | |
| Aerovias Guest | | | AVG | GUEST | 1946 | 1963 | Merged with Aeronaves de Mexico |
| Aladia Airlines | | 9A | AYD | AIRLINES ALADIA | 2006 | 2008 | License still remains technically valid |
| ALMA de México | | C4 | MSO | ALMA | 2006 | 2008 | Ceased operations due to the Great Recession |
| Aviación del Noroeste | | OC | ANW | AVINOR | 1988 | 1996 | Acquired by TAESA |
| Aviacsa | | 6A | CHP | AVIACSA | 1990 | 2009 | Suspended by SCT |
| Avioquintana | | | AQT | AVIOQUINTANA | 1997 | 2021 | |
| Avolar | | V5 | VLI | Avolar | 2005 | 2008 | Tijuana hub and routes taken over by Volaris |
| Aztec Alliance Cargo | | | AAC | AZTEC ALLIANCE | 2021 | 2021 | Never flew |
| Azteca Cargo | | | AVA | | 1994 | 1995 | |
| Calafia Airlines | | A7 | CFV | CALAFIA | 1993 | 2016 | Previously Aéreo Calafia |
| Century Aviation | | | | | 2003 | 2003 | Failed project |
| CESA Cargo | | | | | 2006 | 2008 | |
| COAPA Air | | | OAP | | 2000 | 2009 | |
| Coculum Aeronáutica | | | | | 1948 | 1962 | |
| Danaus Airlines | | | NAU | DANAUS | 2012 | 2013 | Failed project |
| DGO Jet | | | DGO | | 1995 | 1998 | |
| Estrellas Del Aire | | | ETA | ESTRELLAS | 1991 | 1996 | Fleet acquired by Aerolíneas Internacionales and Líneas Aéreas Allegro. |
| Facts Air | | | FCS | | 2000 | 2005 | |
| Gacela Air Cargo | | | GIG | | 2001 | 2008 | |
| Global Air | | | DMJ | DAMOJH | 2003 | 2018 | License revoked due to Cubana de Aviación Flight 972 |
| Grupo Turistico Magno | | | GMT | MAGNO | 1992 | 1994 | Rebranded as Magnicharters |
| Interjet | | 4O | AIJ | ABC AEROLINEAS | 2005 | 2020 | Went bankrupt |
| LAMCASA Carga | | | LMC | | 1996 | 2004 | |
| LaTur | | LP | LPT | LATUR | 1988 | 1992 | Acquired by TAESA |
| LATAM Cargo Mexico | | M7 | MAA | MASAIR | 2016 | 2018 | Renamed back to Mas Air |
| Líneas Aéreas Allegro | | LL | GRO | ALLEGRO | 1992 | 2004 | |
| Líneas Aéreas Azteca | | ZE | LCD | LINEAS AZTECA | 2000 | 2007 | |
| Magnicharters | | UJ | GMT | GRUPOMONTERREY | 1994 | 2026 | Financial problems and license (AOC) suspension. |
| MAYAir | | 5G | MYI | MAYAIR | 1994 | 2020 | Status unknown, presumably bankrupt |
| MCS AeroCarga | | T2 | MCS | CARMEX | 2015 | 2016 | Renamed as TUM AeroCarga |
| Mexicana Cargo | | | | | 1980s | 1987 | |
| Mexicana de Aviación | | MX | MXA | MEXICANA | 1921 | 2010 | Went bankrupt; declared insolvent |
| MexicanaClick | | QA | CBE | CLICK | 2005 | 2010 | |
| MexicanaLink | | I6 | MXI | LINK | 2009 | 2010 | |
| Mexicargo | | GJ | MXC | MEXICARGO | 1991 | 2000 | |
| Mex-Jet | | | MJT | | 2001 | 2005 | Rebranded as VigoJet |
| Nova Air | | | PMO | POLAR MEXICO | 2004 | 2008 | |
| Planet Airways | | | | | 2007 | 2007 | Rebranded as PanAm Air Cargo |
| Puebla Air Lines | | | LPA | LINEASPAL | 1985 | 1995 | Acquired by TAESA |
| Quassar | | | QUA | QUASSAR | 1992 | 1995 | |
| Regional Cargo | | F2 | RCQ | REGIONAL | 2006 | 2011 | |
| Republicair | | | RBC | | 2005 | 2009 | |
| SARO | | UF | SRO | AEREOS ORIENTE | 1991 | 1995 | Went bankrupt due to the Mexican peso crisis |
| Servicios Aéreos de Carga Express | | | | | 1992 | 2000 | |
| Servicios Aerolineas Mexicanas | | | SMS | | 1992 | 1995 | |
| Servicios Aeronáuticos de Oriente | | | SVO | SERVIORIENTE | 1995 | 2003 | |
| SETRA | | | | | 1996 | 2003 | |
| StatusAir | | | | | | | |
| TAESA Lineas Aéreas | | GD | TEJ | TRANSEJECUTIVOS | 1988 | 2000 | Later formed into Líneas Aéreas Azteca |
| Transportes Aéreos del Centro de México | | | | | 1957 | 1987 | Acquired by West Air and renamed Westair de Mexico |
| VARSA | | | VSE | VASRE | 1992 | 1994 | Fleet transferred to Peruvian government |
| Vuelamex | | | | | 2002 | 2002 | Failed project |
| Westair de Mexico | | | | | 1987 | 2003 | |

== See also ==
- Lists of airlines
- List of airlines of Mexico
- Largest airlines in the world
- List of largest airlines in North America
- List of passenger airlines
- List of charter airlines
- List of low-cost airlines
- List of regional airlines
- List of cargo airlines
- List of defunct airlines
- List of airlines by foundation date
- Flag carrier
- List of government-owned airlines
- List of airline holding companies
- Airline codes
- List of airline liveries and logos
- List of companies of Mexico
- Oneworld - Mexicana Airline alliance
- SkyTeam - Aeroméxico Airline alliance
- List of the busiest airports in Mexico
- List of airports in Mexico
- Airline destinations: Mexico
- Transportation in Mexico
- Tourism in Mexico
- Federal Civil Aviation Agency
