= DGO (disambiguation) =

DGO is Durango International Airport, Mexico.

DGO or dgo may also refer to:

- DGO Jet, a Mexican charter airline
- DirecTV Go, a South American video streaming service
- Dogri language, spoken in Jammu, India (ISO 639-3:dgo)
