= Avioquintana =

Mexican airline

IATA	ICAO	Call sign
-	AQT	AVIOQUINTANA
- Founded: 1997; 29 years ago
- Hubs: Cancún International Airport
- Secondary hubs: Chetumal International Airport
- Fleet size: 0
- Headquarters: Quintana Roo, Mexico
- Key people: Mario Hermosillo Torres

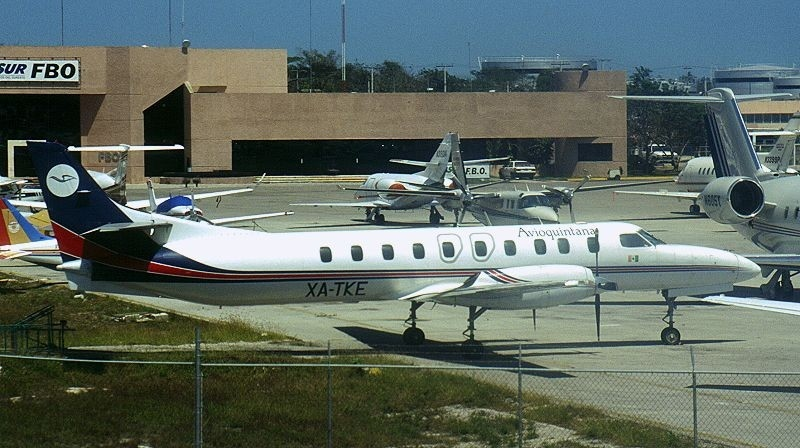

Aviones de Renta de Quintana Roo, S.A. de C.V. (operating as Avioquintana) is an air taxi service based in Quintana Roo, in Mexico. Its owner was Mario Hermosillo Torres, a very important pilot in his age. It was established and started operations in 1997 and operates domestic private charter services. Its main base is Cancún International Airport, with a hub at Chetumal International Airport.

== Fleet ==
The Avioquintana has now no own aircraft (as at September 2020)

== Former fleet ==
- 1 Embraer EMB 120RT Brasilia
- 1 Fairchild Metro II
