= Aladia Airlines =

Mexican low-cost chartered airline (2006-2008)

Aladia

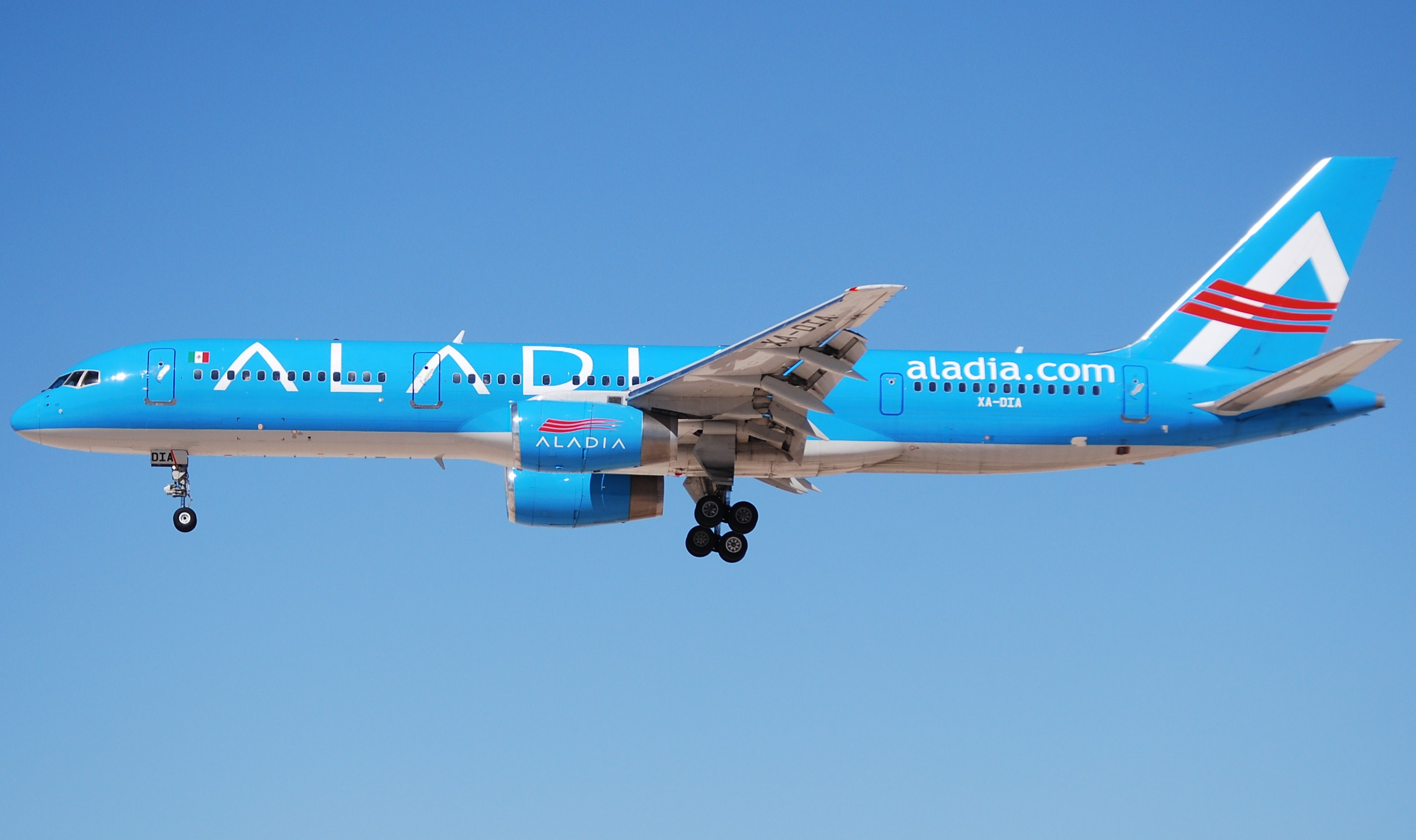
- An Aladia Boeing 757; note the livery bears similarities to that of its parent company, TUI.
IATA	ICAO	Call sign
9A	AYD	AIRLINES ALADIA
- Founded: December 2006; 19 years ago
- Ceased operations: October 21, 2008; 17 years ago
- Hubs: Monterrey International Airport
- Secondary hubs: Cancún International Airport
- Fleet size: 4
- Destinations: 18
- Parent company: TUI Group
- Headquarters: Monterrey, Mexico
- Website: www.aladia.com

Aladia Airlines, S.A. de C.V. was a Mexican low-cost charter airline based in Monterrey, Nuevo León. Commercial operations were commenced in December 2006 using four Boeing 757-200 aircraft on several domestic and international routes.

Due to the 2008 financial crisis, Aladia Airlines suspended all operations on 21 October 2008.

In 2011, Aladia Group removed Pablo González-Ulloa from his position of chairman of the board of directors and all other positions in the company. They also initiated legal action against him, holding him responsible for the mismanagement of the company during his administration. The airline was not officially dissolved and a relaunch may be possible, according to Aladia officials, its AOC remains valid.

== Destinations ==
As of October 2008, Aladia served the following destinations:

Domestic

- Cancún hub
- Chihuahua
- Cozumel
- Guadalajara
- Mazatlán
- Mexico City
- Monterrey hub
- Puerto Vallarta
- Puebla
- Toluca

International

- Vail, Colorado
- Orlando, Florida
- Las Vegas, Nevada
- Aruba
- Brazil
- Costa Rica
- Cuba
- Guatemala

== Fleet ==
Aladia consisted of the following aircraft:

Aladia fleet
Aircraft	In service	Passengers	Notes
Boeing 757-200	4	239	
Total	4		

== See also ==
- List of defunct airlines of Mexico
