= Magnicharters =

Charter airline of Mexico, 1995-2026

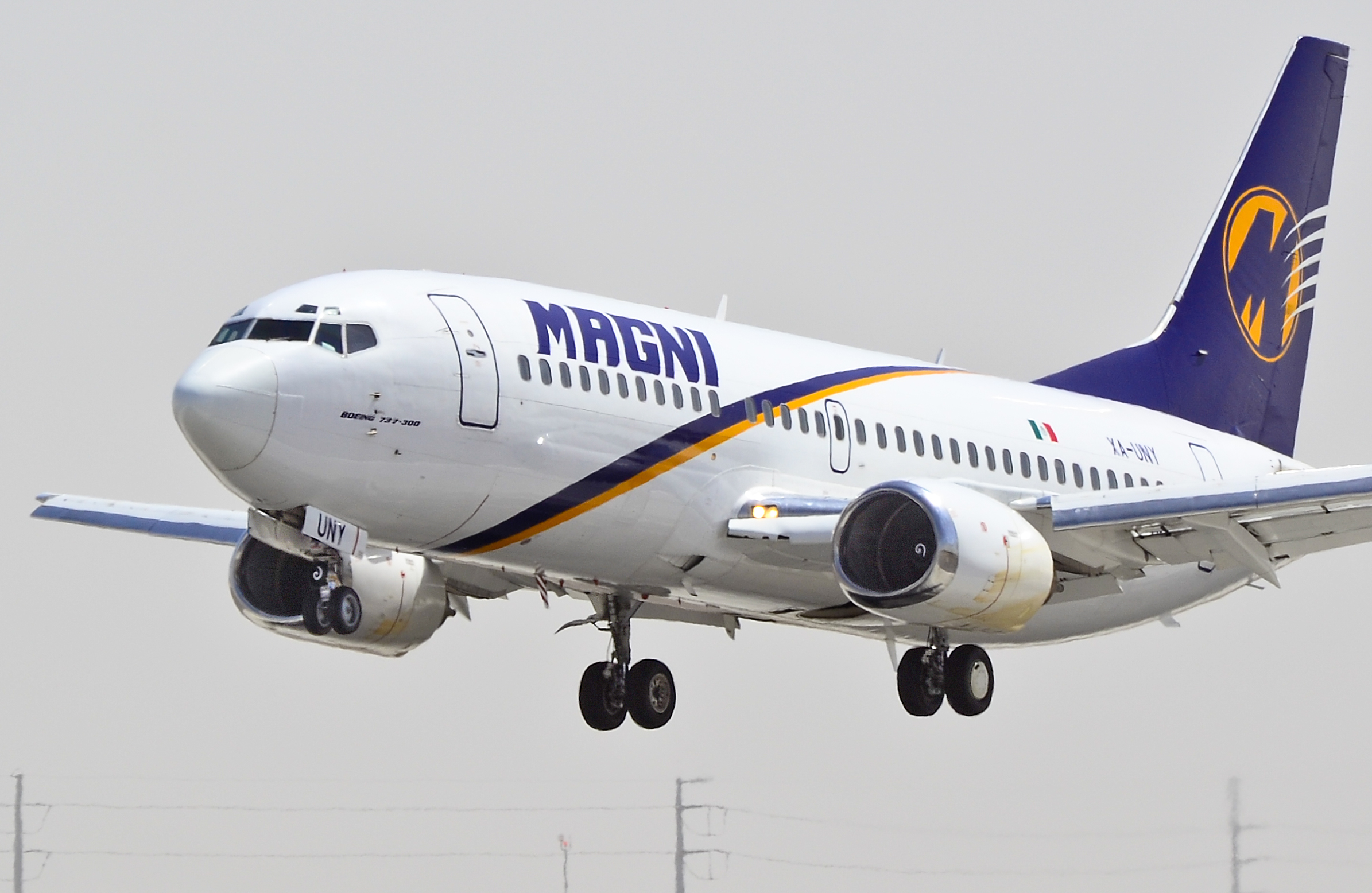
IATA	ICAO	Call sign
UJ	GMT	GRUPOMONTERREY
- Founded: 1994; 32 years ago
- Commenced operations: January 1995; 31 years ago
- Ceased operations: April 15, 2026; 6 months ago
- AOC #: 5MYF355F
- Operating bases: Mexico City; Monterrey
- Fleet size: 5
- Destinations: 27
- Headquarters: Mexico City, Mexico
- Website: www.magnicharters.com

Grupo Aereo Monterrey S.A. de C.V., known under the commercial name Magnicharters, was an airline with its headquarters in Colonia Juárez, Cuauhtémoc, Mexico City, that operated domestic holiday flights out of Mexico City International Airport.

On April 15, 2026, the airline suspended operations following financial struggles.

== History ==
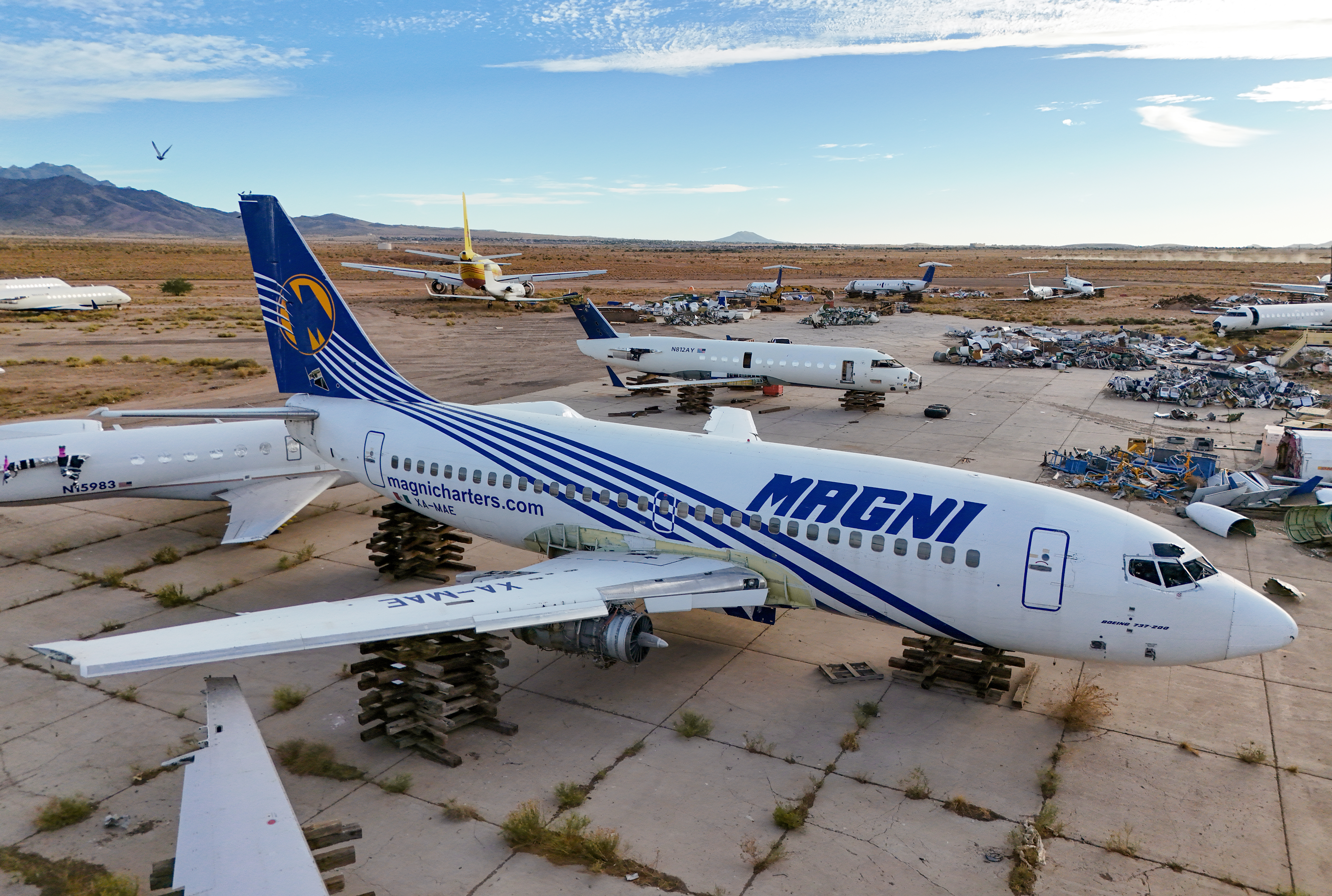
A former Boeing 737-200 being scrapped at Kingman Airport

The travel agency Magnitur was created in 1984. Magnicharters was established in 1994 by the Bojórquez family to fly the clients of Magnitur. It started operations in January 1995. Focusing on the domestic tourism market, it mainly serves the major beach resorts of the country.

Magnicharters was the first Mexican commercial airline to hire a woman pilot.

In 2000, Magnicharters was allowed to offer commercial flights (only charters and cargo flights before).

In 2014, Magnicharters invested $2.5 million to develop its fleet by 30%. That year, the airline started flights to the United States, from Monterrey to Las Vegas and Orlando.

In July 2017, to celebrate the 25 year-anniversary of the Lucha Libre AAA Worldwide, Magnicharters presented 2 planes painted with the masks of Dr. Wagner Jr. and Psycho Clown.

On April 16, 2026, Magnicharters' operations were suspended as a direct result of the airline's poor financial position. This left many passengers stranded in Mexican resort towns due to the mass cancellation of flights.

== Destinations ==
Up until its suspension in April 2026, Magnicharters operated the following destinations:

Hub
Future destination
Seasonal
Terminated destination

City	Country	IATA	ICAO	Airport	Ref
Acapulco	MEX (Guerrero)	ACA	MMAA	Acapulco International Airport	
Aguascalientes	MEX (Aguascalientes)	AGU	MMAS	Aguascalientes International Airport	
Cancún	MEX (Quintana Roo)	CUN	MMUN	Cancún International Airport	
Chihuahua	MEX (Chihuahua)	CUU	MMCU	Chihuahua International Airport	
Cozumel	MEX (Quintana Roo)	CZM	MMCZ	Cozumel International Airport	
Dallas/Fort Worth	USA (Texas)	DFW	KDFW	Dallas/Fort Worth International Airport	
Guadalajara	MEX (Jalisco)	GDL	MMGL	Guadalajara International Airport	
Havana	(Cuba) (La Habana Province)	HAV	MUHA	José Martí International Airport	
Huatulco	MEX (Oaxaca)	HUX	MMBT	Bahías de Huatulco International Airport	
Ixtapa/Zihuatanejo	MEX (Guerrero)	ZIH	MMZH	Ixtapa-Zihuatanejo International Airport	
Las Vegas	(United States) (Nevada)	LAS	KLAS	Harry Reid International Airport	
León	MEX (Guanajuato)	BJX	MMLO	Del Bajío International Airport	
Manzanillo	MEX (Colima)	ZLO	MMZO	Playa de Oro International Airport	
Mazatlán	MEX (Sinaloa)	MZT	MMMZ	Mazatlán International Airport	
Mérida	MEX (Yucatán)	MID	MMMD	Mérida International Airport	
Mexico City	MEX (Mexico City)	MEX	MMMX	Mexico City International Airport	
Mexico City	MEX (State of Mexico)	NLU	MMSM	Felipe Ángeles International Airport	
Monterrey	MEX (Nuevo León)	MTY	MMMY	Monterrey International Airport	
Orlando	USA (Florida)	MCO	KMCO	Orlando International Airport	
Palenque	(Mexico) (Chiapas)	PQM	MMPQ	Palenque International Airport	
Puebla	MEX (Puebla)	PBC	MMPB	Puebla International Airport	
Puerto Vallarta	MEX (Jalisco)	PVR	MMPR	Licenciado Gustavo Díaz Ordaz International Airport	
Punta Cana	DOM (La Altagracia Province)	PUJ	MDPC	Punta Cana International Airport	
Querétaro	MEX (Querétaro)	QRO	MMQT	Querétaro Intercontinental Airport	
San José del Cabo	MEX (Baja California Sur)	SJD	MMSD	Los Cabos International Airport	
San Luis Potosí	MEX (San Luis Potosí)	SLP	MMSP	San Luis Potosí International Airport	
Tuxtla Gutiérrez	MEX (Chiapas)	TGZ	MMTG	Tuxtla Gutiérrez International Airport	
Varadero	(Cuba) (Matanzas Province)	VRA	MUVR	Juan Gualberto Gómez Airport	

Additionally, Magnicharters offered a wide range of charter flights.

== Fleet ==
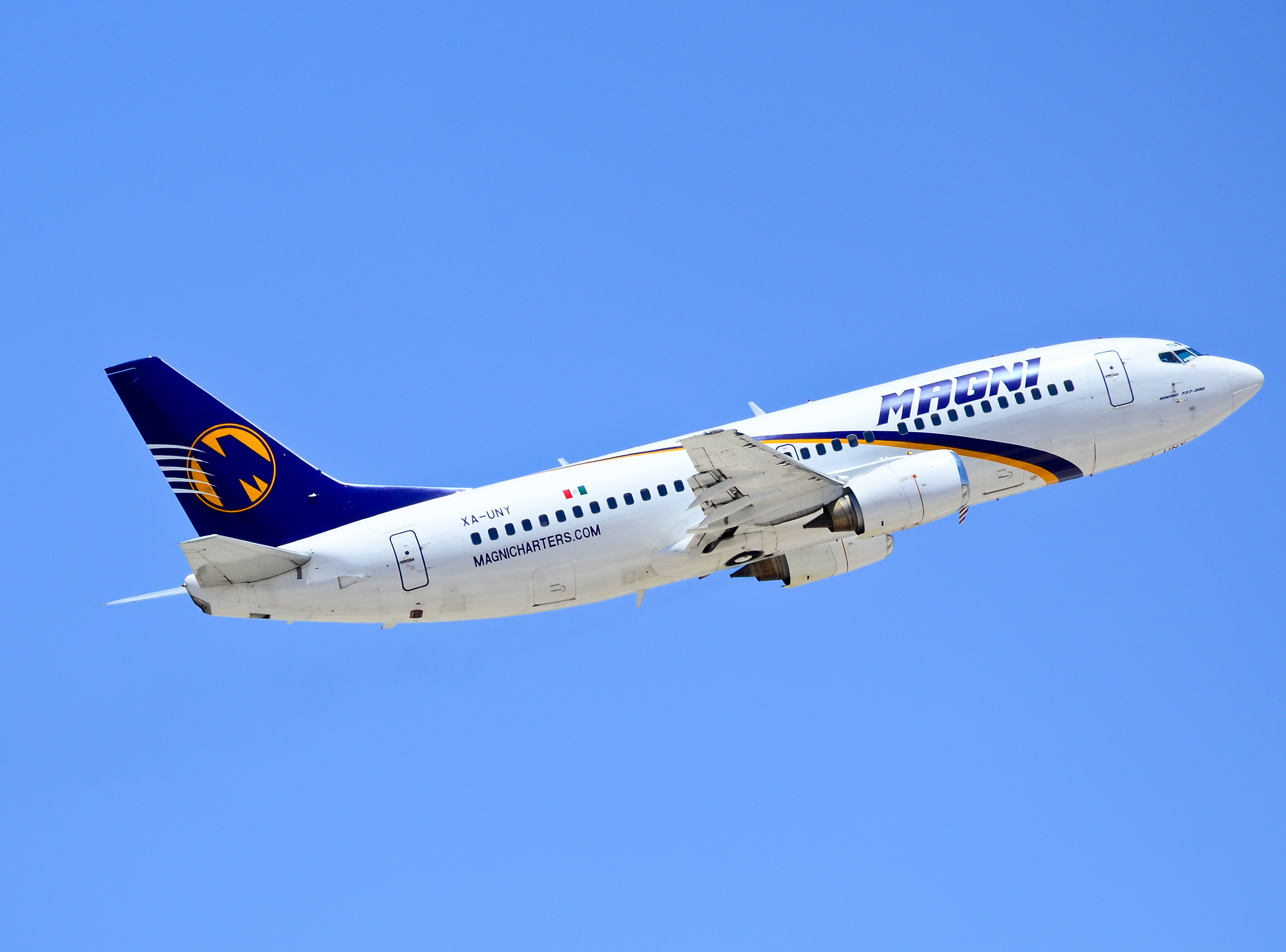
Magnicharters Boeing 737-300

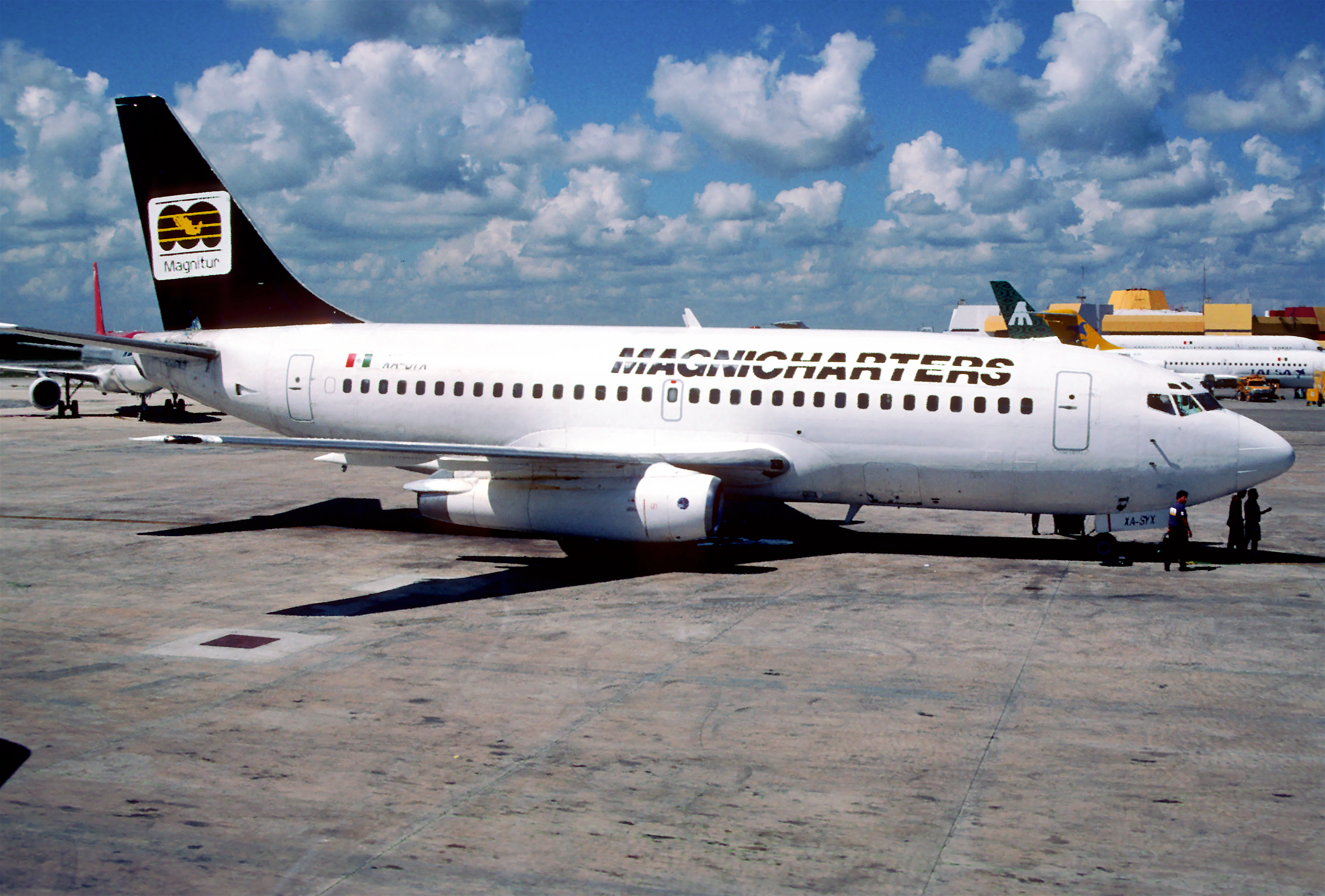
A former Magnicharters Boeing 737-200 in 1997.

=== Fleet ===
The Magnicharters fleet consisted of the following aircraft (prior to its suspension):

Aircraft	In service (before April 2026)	On order	Passengers	Notes
Boeing 737-300	5	—	140	
Total	5	—		

=== Former fleet ===
The Magnicharters fleet previously also included the following aircraft:

- Boeing 727
- Boeing 737-100
- Boeing 737-200
- Boeing 737-500

== Accidents and incidents ==
- On 14 September 2007 at 19:29 local time, the landing gear of a Magnicharters Boeing 737-200 (registered XA-MAC) collapsed upon landing at Guadalajara International Airport. The aircraft with 103 passengers and 6 crew members had been on Flight 582 from Cancún. Following the crash, an engine fire broke out, but the aircraft was evacuated in time, so that there were no fatalities.
- On 27 April 2009 at approximately 18:00 local time another undercarriage failure occurred with a Magnicharters Boeing 737-200 (registered XA-MAF) operating a flight from Cancún to Guadalajara, this time as Flight 585. Upon approaching Guadalajara International Airport, the landing gear could not be fully lowered, so the pilots had to perform a belly landing. There were no serious injuries among the 108 passengers and 8 crew on board.
- In December 2014, a pilot of the airline was laid off for letting the singer Esmeralda Ugalde sit in the pilot's seat and take possession of the plane's control during a commercial flight. The singer had taken photos and posted them on Twitter.
- In December 2014, the PROFECO suspended the commercial activity of Magnicharters because the company did not release its prices to the public.
- On 26 November 2015 another landing gear problem on a Boeing 737-300 occurred and caused the left main leg to fail and sway the aircraft, but without any injuries. A photo labelled "MEXICO AIRPORT FIRE DEPT" shows the left main gear leg displaced to the rear, with a broken wing root fairing. This points out not to a folded LG, but a structural failure.

== See also ==
- List of defunct airlines of Mexico
- Lists of airlines
