= Cancún International Airport =

International airport in Quintana Roo, Mexico

Cancun International Airport Aeropuerto Internacional de Cancún

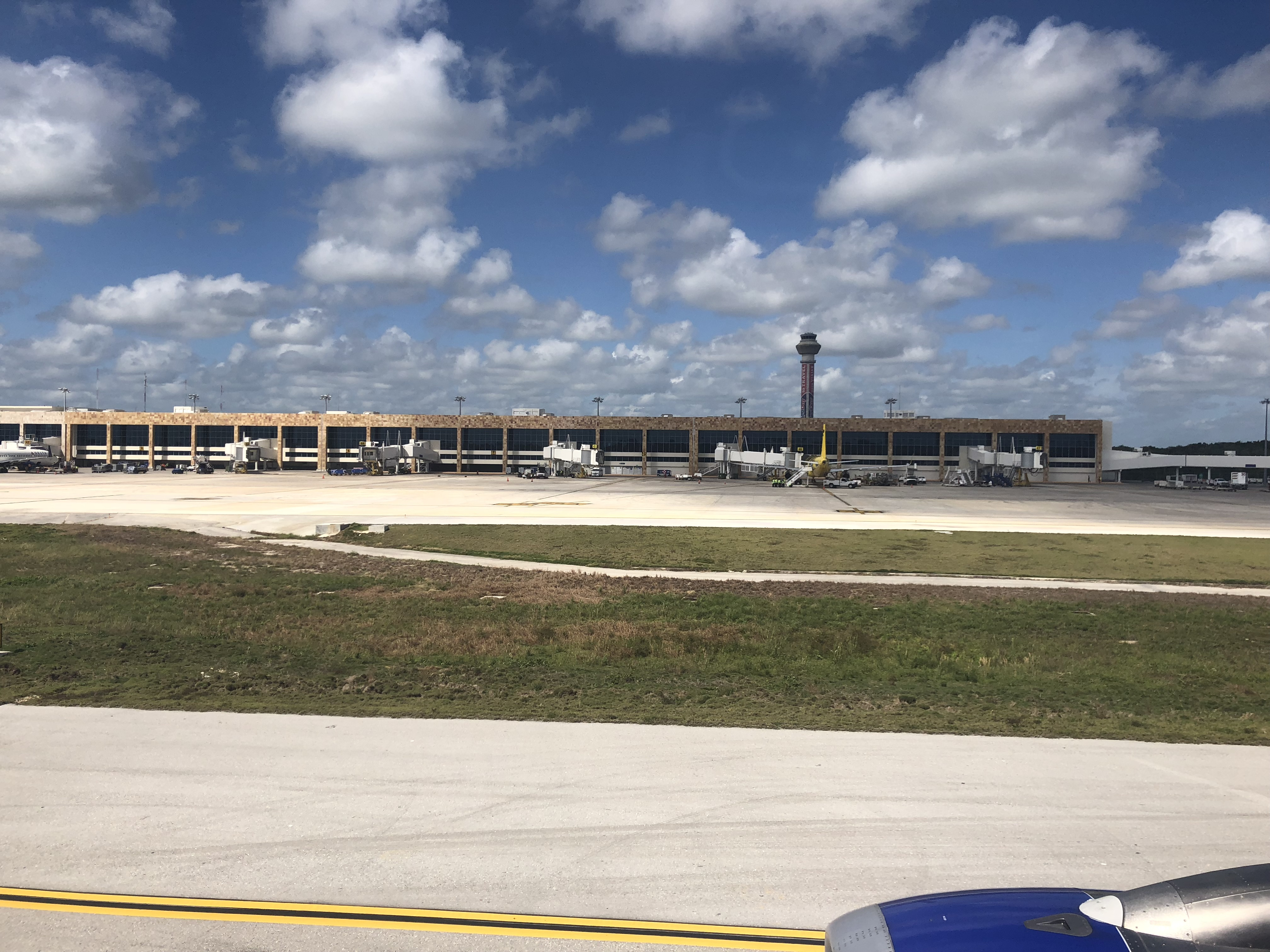
- Terminal 4 view of CUN in November 2018
- IATA: CUN; ICAO: MMUN

Summary
- Airport type: Public
- Operator: Grupo Aeroportuario del Sureste
- Serves: Cancún
- Location: Benito Juárez, Quintana Roo, Mexico
- Opened: May 12, 1975; 51 years ago
- Operating base for: Viva; Volaris
- Time zone: EST (UTC-05:00)
- Elevation AMSL: 6 m (20 ft)
- Coordinates: 21°02′12″N 86°52′37″W
- Website: www.asur.com.mx

Map
- Location in Quintana Roo CUN/MMUN (Mexico)

Runways
Direction	Length		Surface
Direction	m	ft	Surface
12R/30L	3,500	11,483	Asphalt
12L/30R	2,800	9,186	Asphalt

Statistics (2025)
- Total passengers: 29,345,538
- International passengers: 19,464,554
- Ranking in Mexico: 2nd
- Source: Grupo Aeroportuario del Sureste

Cancún International Airport (IATA: CUN, ICAO: MMUN) is an international airport serving Cancún, the most populous city in the Mexican state of Quintana Roo. It is Mexico's second busiest airport and the busiest in the country and Latin America for international passengers. Located in the Cancún Metropolitan Area in Quintana Roo, it serves as the primary gateway to the Mexican Caribbean, Riviera Maya, and Yucatán Peninsula, offering flights to over 100 cities across the Americas and Europe.

While it serves as an operating base for Viva, Volaris and Magnicharters, Cancún Airport primarily functions as a major destination for most U.S. and Canadian mainline airlines, serving routes from all their hubs and focus cities, and making it the non-U.S. airport with the most U.S. destinations.

Operated by Grupo Aeroportuario del Sureste (ASUR), the airport also handles general and executive aviation, flight training, and international charter services. It is the easternmost airport in Mexico, with Cozumel and Tulum airports serving as alternative options in the Cancún area. In 2024, the airport handled approximately 30.4 million passengers, with a slight decrease to 29.3 million in 2025, of which 19.4 million were international passengers.

== History ==
=== Early operations ===
Cancún's initial airport was established in 1942 as a strategic move to support the region's primary industry at the time: the chewing gum. This early airport operated on a rudimentary runway, featuring a control tower constructed from wood and reeds that remained in operation until 1973. To commemorate its history, a replica stands near the city's entrance, close to its original location. A replica stands near the city's entrance, close to its original location, near what is now Kabah Avenue.

In the early 1970s, Cancun emerged as a major tourist destination following a deliberate effort by the Mexican government, in collaboration with the National Tourism Development Fund (Spanish: Fondo Nacional de Fomento al Turismo FONATUR). Recognizing its strategic location near pristine beaches, natural landscapes, and archaeological sites, the comprehensive plan aimed to transform Cancun from a sparsely inhabited area into a major international tourist destination. Substantial investments in infrastructure were made, including the construction of the new Cancun International Airport, designed and built by Henro y Asociados in collaboration with the Department of Infrastructure. The airport's inaugural commercial flight occurred on May 12, 1975, prompting an immediate increase in international traffic.

Throughout its history, Cancun Airport has served as a base for multiple carriers over the years. It served as a hub for Mexicana, Interjet, and Aladia in their operational years, facilitating both domestic and international connections. The defunct charter airline Aerocancun also provided charter flights to the United States, Canada, Europe, and South America. MAYAir, established in 1994 initially as a charter airline, expanded its routes from Cancun to various destinations in the Yucatán Peninsula.

=== Privatization and expansion ===
In 1995, Mexico embarked on a significant airport privatization initiative through the 'Ley de Aeropuertos' (Airports Law) introduced by the Department of Infrastructure. This marked a pivotal moment for Cancun Airport, integrating it into the Grupo Aeroportuario del Sureste (ASUR).

Until the early 2000s, Cancun Airport operated with two terminals. A major transformation began in 2005 when ASUR invested US$150 million in constructing Terminal 3, officially inaugurated in 2007. Key additions, including a new runway and then Latin America's tallest control tower at 97 meters, were unveiled in October 2009, effectively doubling the airport's passenger handling capacity. On November 27, 2013, Cancun Airport achieved another milestone, becoming the first in Mexico to welcome the Airbus A380, commemorating the 80th anniversary of Air France and the 15th anniversary of ASUR.

The expansion continued with an expansion of Terminal 2 in 2014 and a significant 76,000 square metres (820,000 sq ft) expansion of Terminal 3 in 2016, introducing six gates and additional commercial areas. This expansion raised annual passenger capacity from 6 million to 10 million. In response to the overcrowding and surging demand, Terminal 4 was inaugurated in October 2017.

Despite challenges from the COVID-19 pandemic, Mexican authorities kept borders open for tourism, making Cancún one of the few international destinations to remain accessible. In 2023, a Tren Maya station was inaugurated adjacent to the airport as part of a federal rail project. In parallel, ASUR initiated the second phase of Terminal 4's expansion, which includes new passenger areas, apron extensions, and a new supplementary 24-metre (79 ft) tall control tower. ASUR expects the expanded terminal to be fully operational by 2026. In early 2025, ASUR also began construction on a comprehensive revival of Terminal 1, which had remained closed since the mid-2010s.

== Facilities ==
The airport is located in the Cancún urban area, less than 10 kilometres (6.2 mi) southwest of the city's main Hotel Zone, at an elevation of 6 metres (20 ft) above sea level. It can accommodate large aircraft such as the Boeing 747 and Airbus A380, and features two parallel operational runways that can be used simultaneously: Runway 12R/30L is 3,500 metres (11,500 ft) long, while Runway 12L/30R spans 2,800 metres (9,200 ft).

Cancún Airport comprises four passenger terminals—more than any other airport in Mexico—and an FBO terminal. Additional facilities include long- and short-term parking, on-site hotels, a variety of restaurants, rental car services, and installations for the Mexican Air Navigation Services (Spanish: Servicios a la Navegación en el Espacio Aéreo Mexicano, SENEAM).

An inter-terminal shuttle service runs between terminals, with departures every 10 minutes.

== Terminals ==
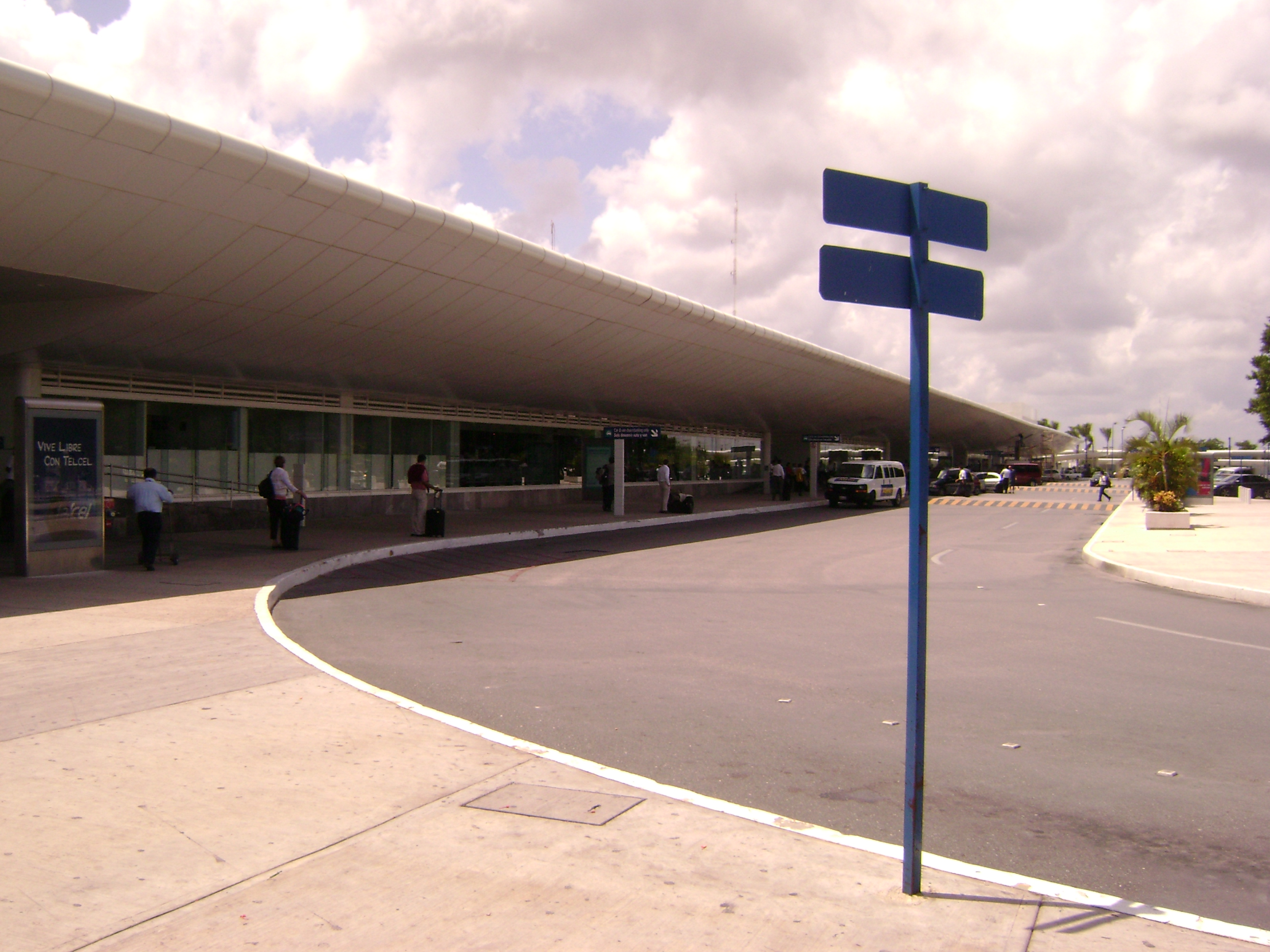
Terminal 2 entrance

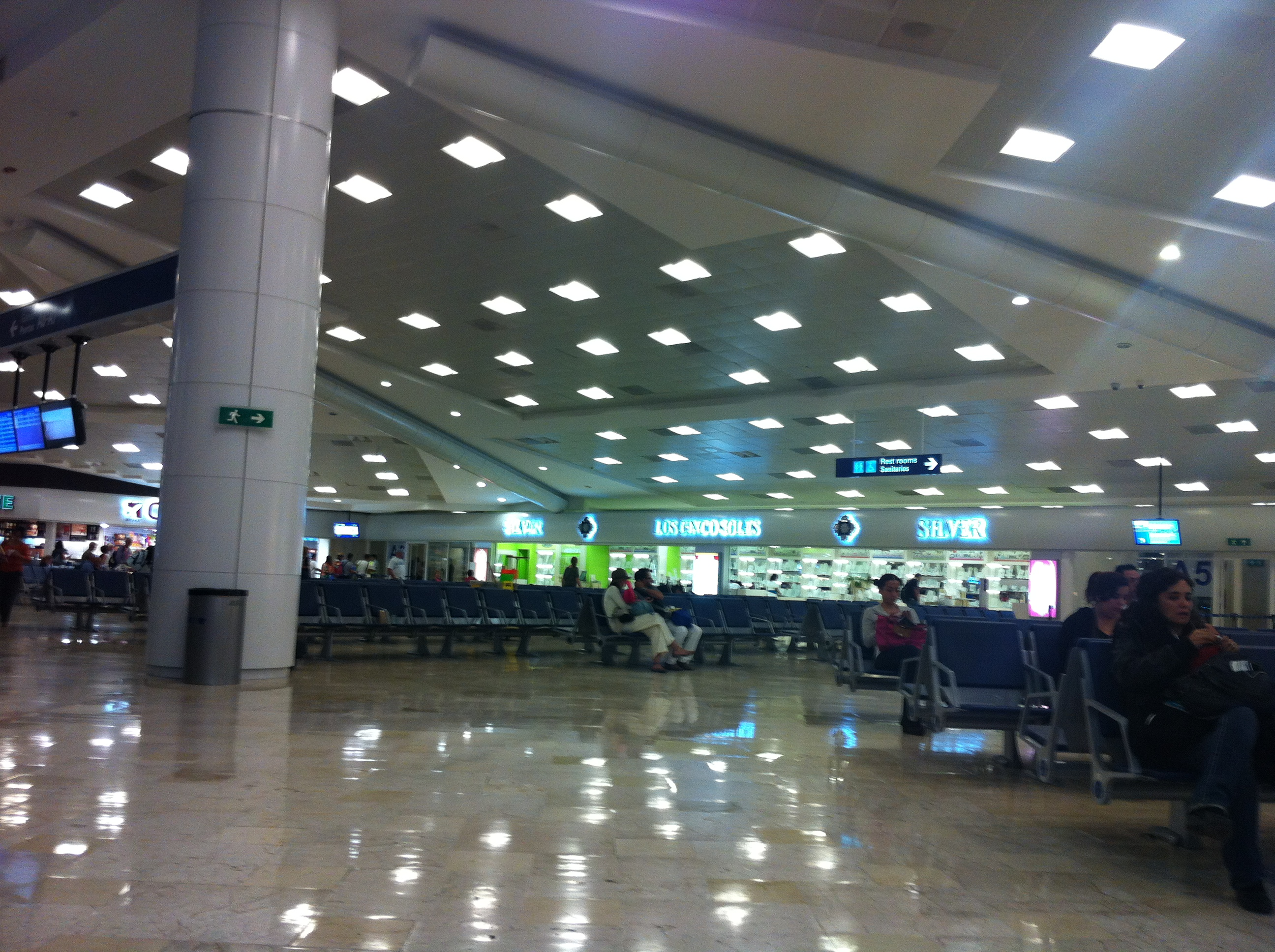
Terminal 2 satellite building

=== Terminal 1 (temporarily closed) ===
Exclusively dedicated to charter and private flights, Terminal 1 features 7 gates numbered 1 to 7, 3 helicopter stands, and a VIP lounge. Temporarily closed for reconstruction after Hurricane Wilma, the terminal resumed operations between 2013 and 2018. The terminal is undergoing a comprehensive remodeling and expansion, with reopening planned for 2026.

=== Terminal 2 ===
As the oldest terminal, Terminal 2 handles arrivals and departures for domestic and international flights. With 22 gates—A1 through A11 (in a satellite building) and B12 through B22 (at the main building)—it serves most domestic airlines, along with most international flights to Central and South America and select long-haul flights to Europe. The check-in area houses a bank and food outlets, while the boarding area features several restaurants and shops, along with immigration/customs services. Two lounges, the MERA Business Lounge and The Lounge by Global Lounge Network, cater to both domestic and international travelers.

The primary tenants at the terminal are Viva, which operates a hub at this location and Volaris, along with its subsidiaries Volaris Costa Rica and Volaris El Salvador operate a focus city. Other airlines serving Terminal 2 include Aerolíneas Argentinas, Alaska Airlines, Arajet, Avianca, Avianca El Salvador, Conviasa, Copa Airlines, GOL Linhas Aéreas, LATAM Chile, LATAM Perú, LOT Polish Airlines, Neos, Sky Airline Peru, TUI Airways, TUI fly Netherlands, TUI fly Belgium, and Wingo.

=== Terminal 3 ===
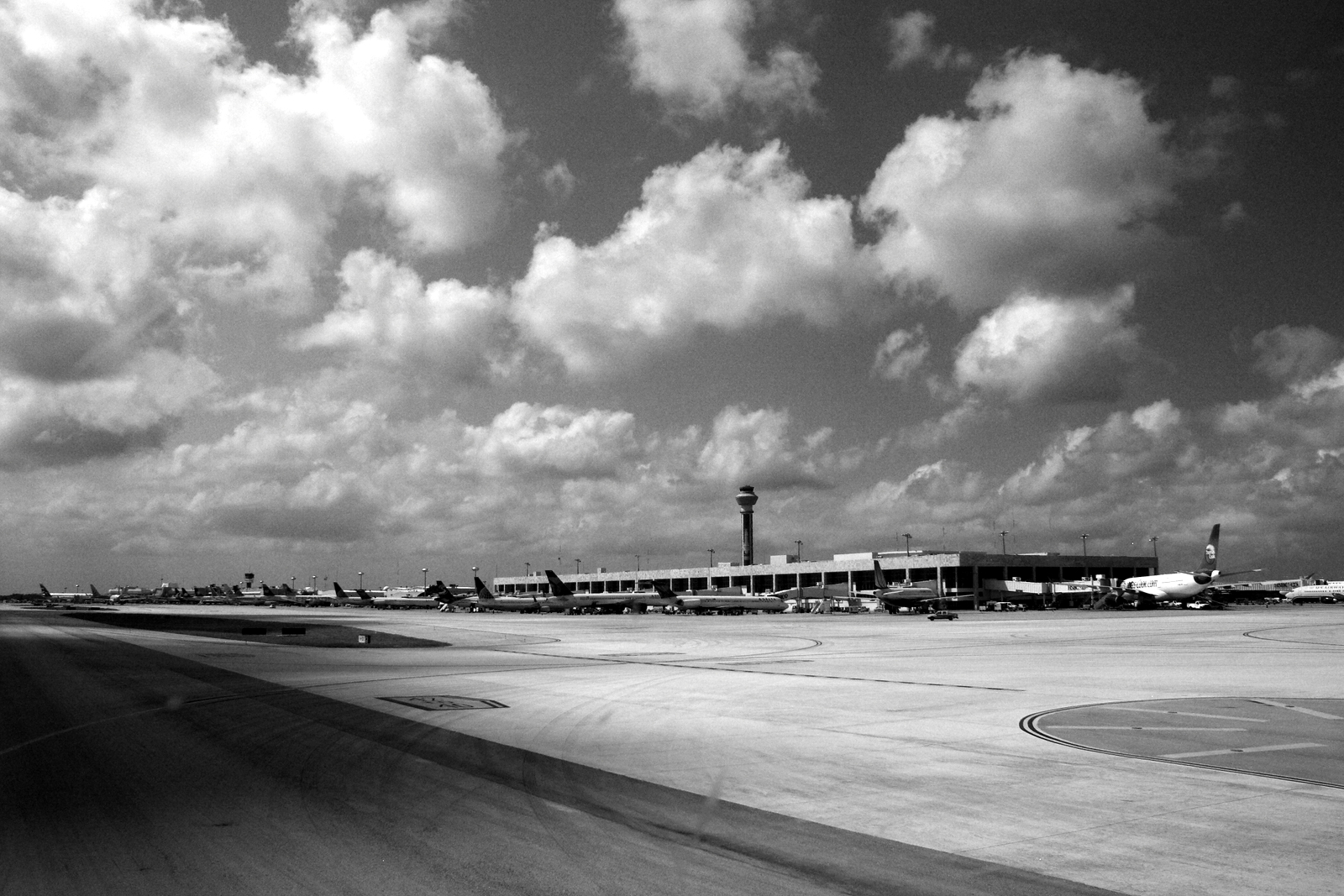
Terminal 3 airside

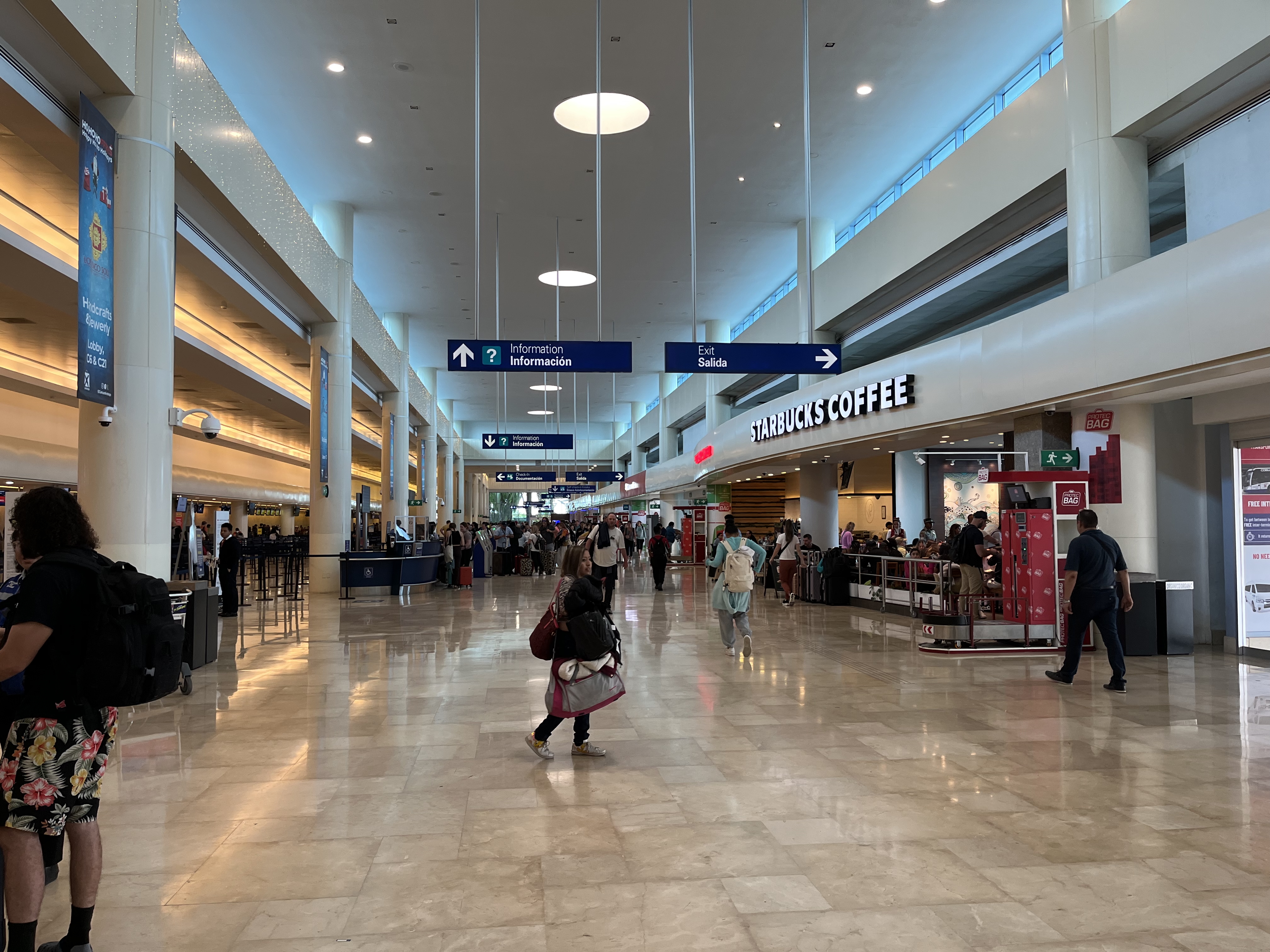
Terminal 3 main hall in 2024

Dedicated exclusively to international flights, Terminal 3 features 21 gates (C4 through C24) and is primarily used by major U.S., Canadian, and European airlines. Facilities include duty-free shops, cafés, restaurants, immigration and customs facilities, and the MERA Business Lounge. The ground transportation facility is located outside the arrivals hall.

Airlines operating from Terminal 3 include Air Canada, Air Canada Rouge, Air Caraïbes, American Airlines, Avelo, British Airways, Delta Air Lines, Iberojet, United Airlines, and World2Fly.

==== Parking ====
Terminal 3 has an official parking lot located directly in front of the terminal building, providing pedestrian access to check-in area. The parking lot is open 24/7.

The payment is made via ATMs located near the pedestrian exits, which accept cash (Mexican pesos) and major credit cards.

=== Terminal 4 ===
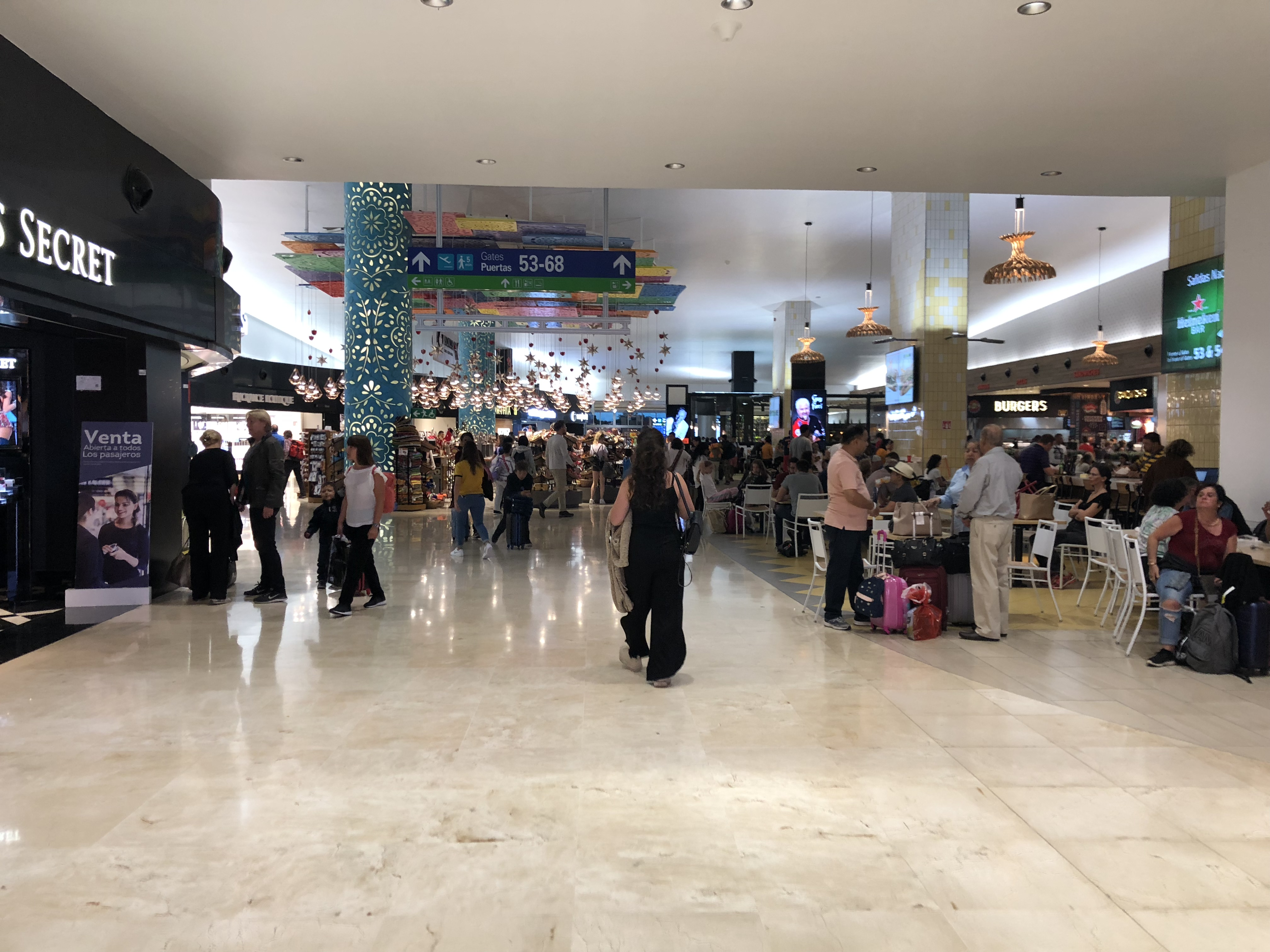
Terminal 4 departures concourse

Terminal 4 serves both domestic and international flights. Opened in October 2017, it made Cancún Airport the first in Mexico with four terminals. It features 14 gates and a capacity of 9 million passengers per year. It is currently being expanded. The terminal has three lounges: the MERA Business Lounge (domestic), MERA Business Lounge (international), and The Lounge in partnership with Air Transat.

Airlines operating from Terminal 4 include Aeroméxico, Air Europa, Air France, Air Transat, Condor, Discover Airlines, Edelweiss Air, Flair Airlines, Frontier Airlines, JetBlue, KLM, Porter Airlines, Southwest Airlines, Sun Country Airlines, TAP Air Portugal, Turkish Airlines, Virgin Atlantic, and WestJet.

=== FBO terminal ===
The FBO terminal caters to general aviation from Mexico, the United States, and Latin America. It is positioned south of the passenger terminal complex, near the main airport entrance. It offers various services, including ground support, fuel coordination, ground transportation, car rental, catering, and airport lounges. Additionally, the FBO accommodates scheduled flights operated by the Belizean airline Tropic Air.

== Airlines and destinations ==
=== Passenger ===
Airlines	Destinations
Aer Lingus	Seasonal: Dublin
Aerolíneas Argentinas	Buenos Aires–Ezeiza
Aeroméxico	Mexico City–Benito Juárez, Mexico City–Felipe Ángeles, Miami; Seasonal: Raleigh/Durham
Air Canada	Montréal–Trudeau; Seasonal: Ottawa, Toronto–Pearson,
Air Canada Rouge	Montréal–Trudeau, Toronto–Pearson; Seasonal: Calgary (begins December 11, 2026), Edmonton, Halifax, Ottawa, Québec City, Vancouver, Winnipeg
Air Caraïbes	Paris–Orly
Air Europa	Madrid
Air France	Paris–Charles de Gaulle
Air Transat	Montréal–Trudeau, Québec City, Toronto–Pearson; Seasonal: Charlottetown, Fredericton, Halifax, London (ON), Moncton, Ottawa Windsor
Alaska Airlines	Seattle/Tacoma; Seasonal: Kansas City, Portland (OR)
American Airlines	Austin, Charlotte, Chicago–O'Hare, Dallas/Fort Worth, Miami, New York–JFK, Philadelphia, Phoenix–Sky Harbor; Seasonal: Boston, Cincinnati, Columbus–Glenn, Indianapolis, Kansas City, Los Angeles, Nashville, Oklahoma City, Pittsburgh, Raleigh/Durham, St. Louis
Arajet	Punta Cana, Santo Domingo–Las Américas
Avianca	Bogotá, Medellín–JMC
Avianca El Salvador	Guatemala City, San Salvador
Breeze Airways	Tampa (begins December 18, 2026); Seasonal: Charleston (SC), New Orleans, Norfolk, Pittsburgh (begins January 7, 2027), Richmond (begins January 8, 2027)
British Airways	London–Gatwick
Condor	Frankfurt
Conviasa	Caracas
Copa Airlines	Panama City–Tocumen
Delta Air Lines	Atlanta, Austin, Boston, Detroit, Los Angeles, Minneapolis/St. Paul, New York–JFK, Salt Lake City, Seattle/Tacoma; Seasonal: Cincinnati, Indianapolis, Kansas City, Nashville, Raleigh/Durham
Discover Airlines	Seasonal: Frankfurt
Edelweiss Air	Zurich
Flair Airlines	Toronto–Pearson; Seasonal: Calgary (resumes December 16, 2026), Edmonton (resumes December 16, 2026), Montréal–Trudeau (resumes December 17, 2026), Vancouver
Frontier Airlines	Atlanta, Chicago–O'Hare, Cincinnati, Cleveland, Denver, Detroit, Orlando, Philadelphia, St. Louis, Seasonal: Dallas/Fort Worth, Houston–Intercontinental
Iberojet	Madrid; Seasonal: Barcelona, Lisbon
JetBlue	Boston, Fort Lauderdale, New York–JFK, Orlando, Tampa
KLM	Seasonal: Amsterdam
LATAM Chile	Santiago de Chile
LATAM Perú	Lima
LOT Polish Airlines	Seasonal charter: Katowice, Warsaw–Chopin
Neos	Milan–Malpensa, Rome–Fiumicino, Verona
Porter Airlines	Ottawa, Toronto–Pearson; Seasonal: Halifax (begins 18 December 2026), Hamilton (ON), London (ON) (begins December 17, 2026)
Southwest Airlines	Austin, Baltimore, Chicago–Midway, Denver, Houston–Hobby, Indianapolis, Kansas City, Las Vegas, Milwaukee Nashville, Orlando, Phoenix–Sky Harbor, St. Louis; Seasonal: Colorado Springs, Columbus–Glenn, New Orleans, Pittsburgh, San Antonio
Sun Country Airlines	Minneapolis/St. Paul; Seasonal: Milwaukee
TAP Air Portugal	Seasonal: Lisbon
Tropic Air	Belize City
TUI Airways	Birmingham (UK), London–Gatwick, Manchester; Seasonal: Belfast–International, Cardiff, Glasgow, Newcastle upon Tyne, Stockholm–Arlanda; Seasonal charter: Dublin, Oslo
TUI fly Netherlands	Amsterdam
Turkish Airlines	Istanbul
United Airlines	Chicago–O'Hare, Cleveland, Denver, Houston–Intercontinental, Los Angeles, Newark, San Francisco, Washington–Dulles
Virgin Atlantic	London–Heathrow
Viva	Acapulco, Bogotá, Camagüey, Chihuahua, Ciudad Juárez, Culiacán, Guadalajara, Havana, Hermosillo, León/El Bajío, Mexicali, Mexico City–Benito Juárez, Mexico City–Felipe Ángeles, Monterrey, Nuevo Laredo (begins November 14, 2026), Puebla, Puerto Vallarta, Querétaro, Reynosa, Saltillo, San José del Cabo, Tampico, Tijuana, Toluca/Mexico City, Torreón/Gómez Palacio, Tuxtla Gutiérrez, Veracruz, Villahermosa; Seasonal: Cincinnati, Columbus–Glenn, Memphis
Volaris	Aguascalientes, Guadalajara, Guatemala City, León/El Bajío, Mexico City–Benito Juárez, Mexico City–Felipe Ángeles, Monterrey, Morelia, Oaxaca, Puebla, Querétaro, San José (CR), San José del Cabo (begins December 1, 2026), San Luis Potosí, Tijuana, Toluca/Mexico City, Tuxtla Gutiérrez
Volaris Costa Rica	San José (CR)
WestJet	Calgary, Edmonton, Montréal–Trudeau, Québec City, Toronto–Pearson, Vancouver, Winnipeg; Seasonal: Bagotville, Deer Lake, Fredericton, Halifax, Hamilton (ON), Kelowna, Kitchener/Waterloo, London (ON), Moncton, Ottawa, Regina, St. John's, Saskatoon, Thunder Bay, Victoria, Windsor
Wingo	Seasonal: Bogotá, Medellín–JMC
World2Fly	Madrid

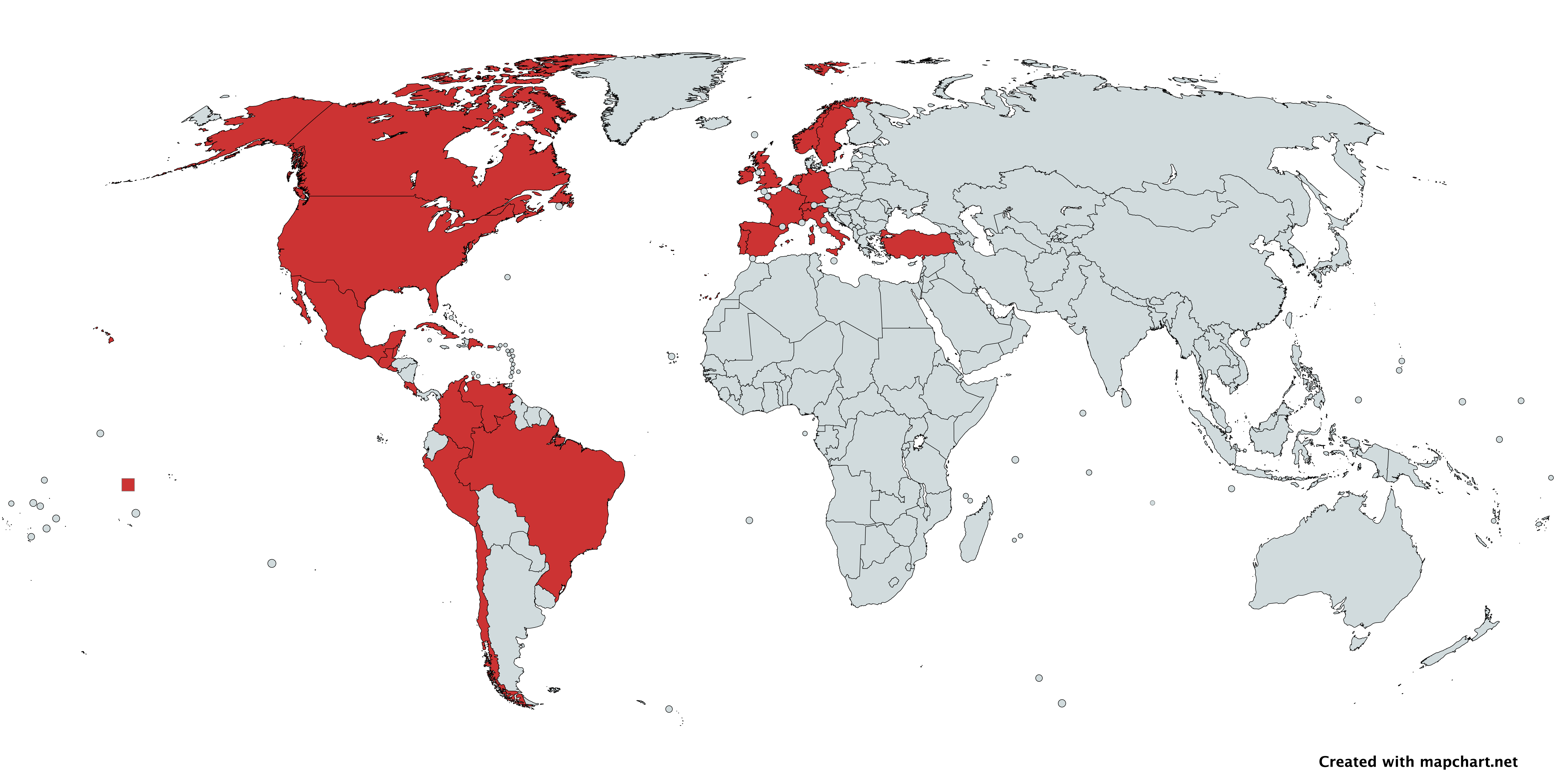
Cancún International Airport passenger destinations

=== Destination maps ===
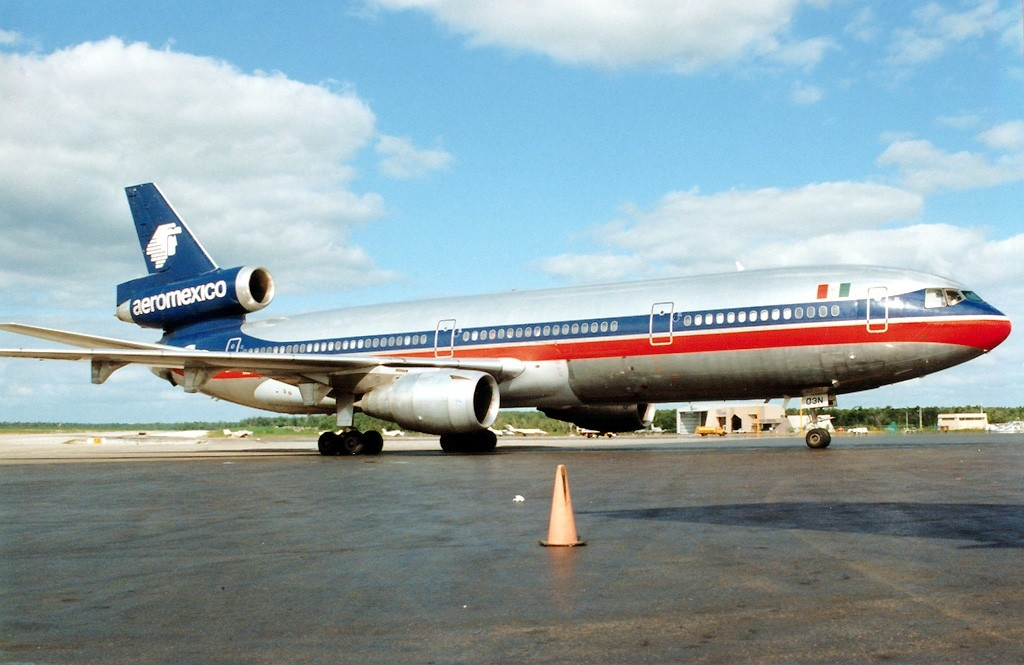
AeroMexico DC-10-15 at CUN in December 1992

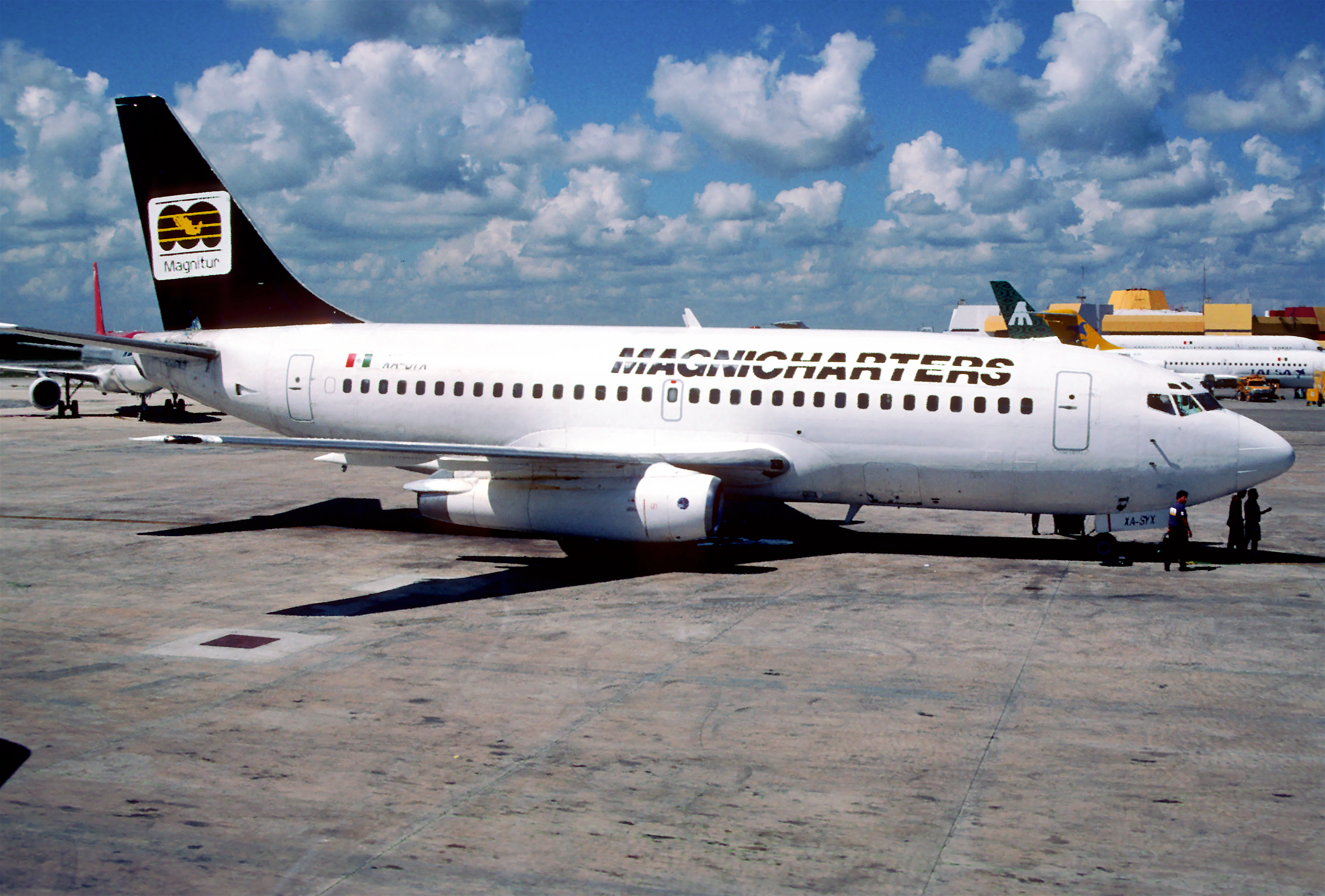
Magnicharters Boeing 737-222 at CUN in February 1997

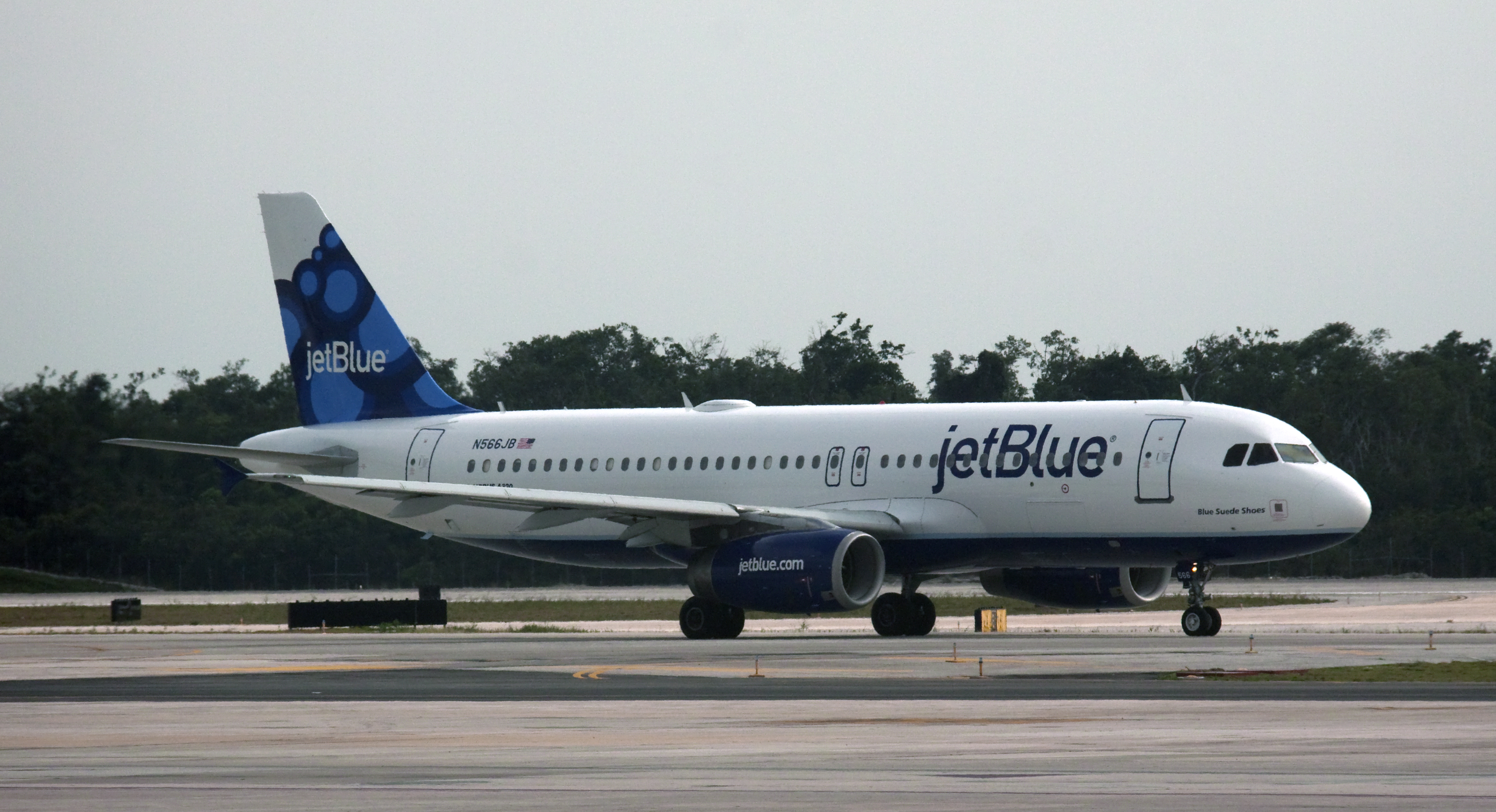
JetBlue Airways A320 at CUN in February 2010

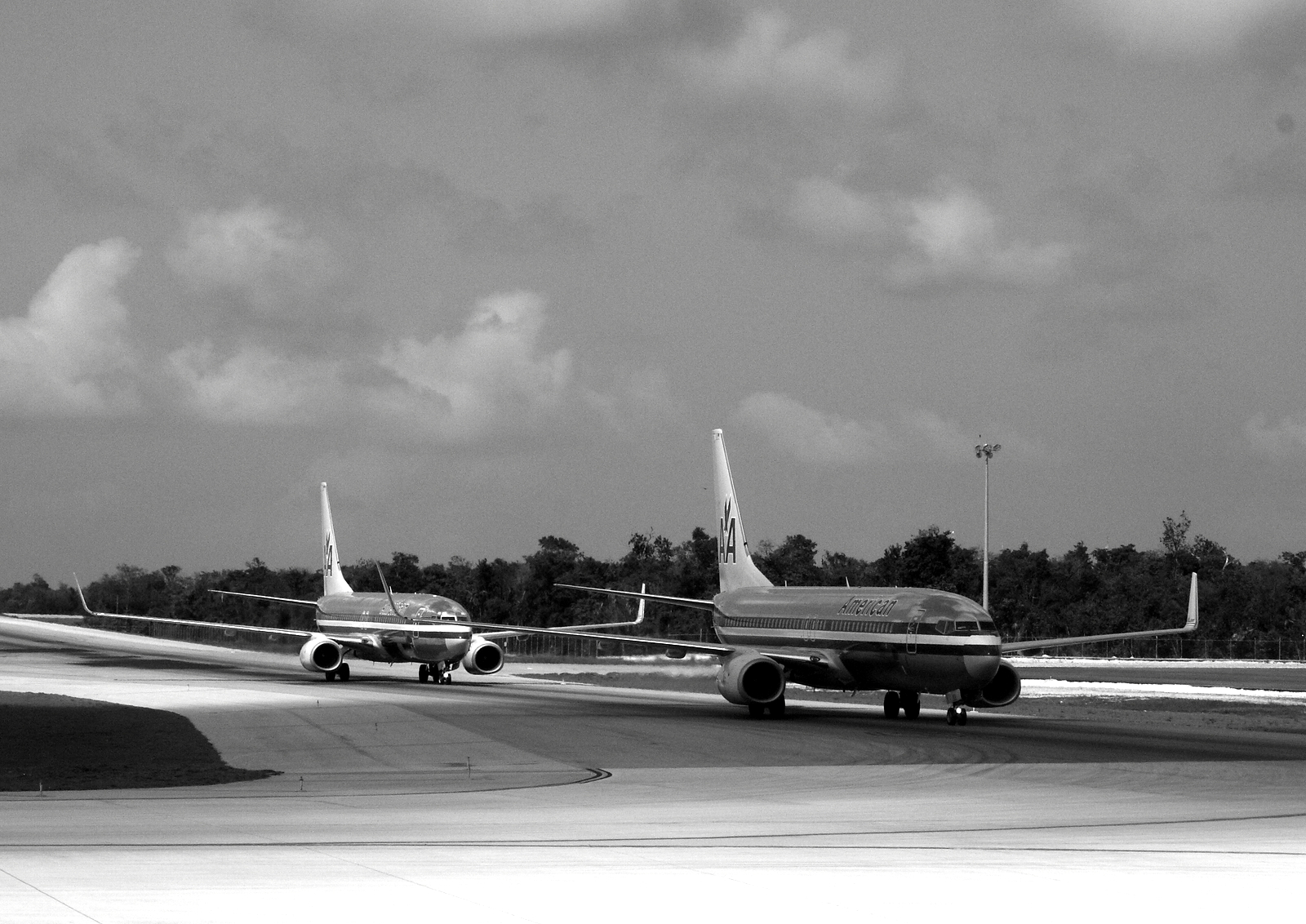
Two American Airlines Boeing B737-800s at CUN in April 2012

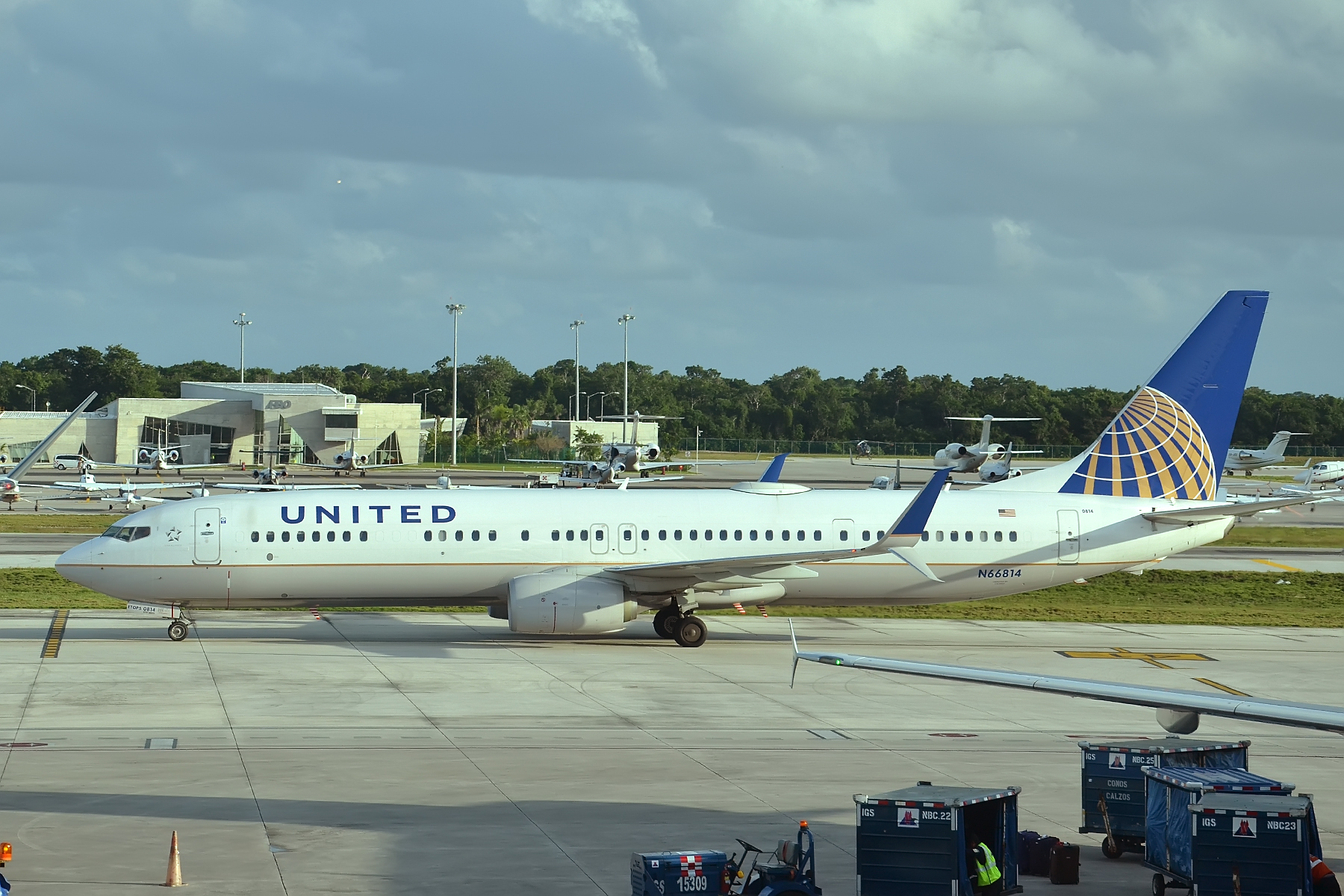
United Airlines Boeing 737-924ER at CUN in January 2016. FBO terminal in the background.

Domestic destinations from Cancún International Airport
Red = Year-round destination
Blue = Future destination
Green = Seasonal destination
Grey = Charter destination
Canadian destinations from Cancún International Airport
Red = Year-round destination
Blue = Future destination
Green = Seasonal destination
Cyan = Future seasonal destination
US destinations from Cancún International Airport
Red = Year-round destination
Blue = Future destination
Green = Seasonal destination
Grey = Charter destination
Cyan = Future seasonal destination
Central American and Caribbean destinations from Cancún International Airport
Red = Year-round destination
Blue = Future destination
Green = Seasonal destination
South American destinations from Cancún International Airport
Red = Year-round destination
Blue = Future destination
Green = Seasonal destination
European destinations from Cancún International Airport
Red = Year-round destination
Blue = Future destination
Green = Seasonal destination
Grey = Charter destination

== Statistics ==
=== Passengers ===
Passenger statistics
Year	Total passengers	% change
1999	6,969,733	–
2000	7,745,317	▲11.1%
2001	7,639,021	▼1.4%
2002	7,717,144	▲1.0%
2003	8,683,950	▲12.5%
2004	10,010,526	▲15.3%
2005	9,301,240	▼7.1%
2006	9,728,149	▲4.6%
2007	11,340,027	▲16.6%
2008	12,646,451	▲11.5%
2009	11,174,908	▼11.6%
2010	12,439,266	▲11.3%
2011	13,022,481	▲4.7%
2012	14,463,435	▲11.1%
2013	15,962,162	▲10.4%
2014	17,455,353	▲9.4%
2015	19,596,485	▲12.3%
2016	21,415,795	▲9.3%
2017	23,601,509	▲10.2%
2018	25,202,016	▲6.8%
2019	25,481,989	▲1.1%
2020	12,259,148	▼51.89%
2021	22,318,467	▲82.1%
2022	30,342,961	▲36.0%
2023	32,750,411	▲7.9%
2024	30,411,520	▼7.1%
2025	29,345,538	▼3.5%

=== Busiest routes ===
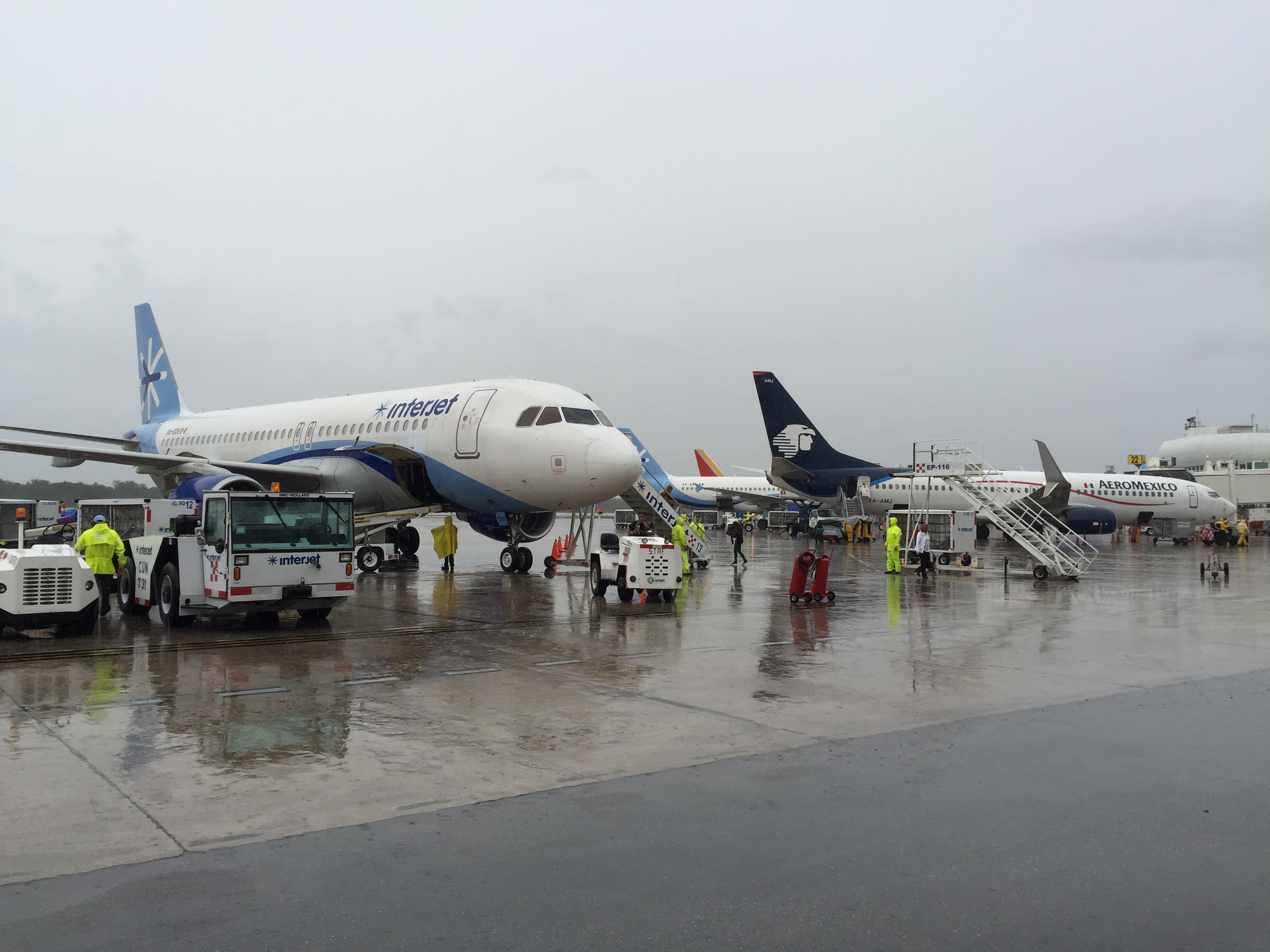
Interjet Airbus A320 and Aeromexico Boeing B737 at CUN

Busiest domestic routes from CUN (Jan–Dec 2025)
Rank	City	Passengers
1	Mexico City, Mexico City	1,594,104
2	Monterrey, Nuevo León	745,240
3	Mexico City–AIFA, State of Mexico	501,168
4	Guadalajara, Jalisco	484,031
5	Toluca, State of Mexico	209,323
6	Tijuana, Baja California	179,378
7	Puebla, Puebla	178,120
8	León/El Bajío, Guanajuato	172,857
9	Querétaro, Querétaro	164,515
10	Veracruz, Veracruz	125,207

Busiest international routes from CUN (Jan–Dec 2025)
Rank	City	Passengers
1	Toronto–Pearson, Canada	637,844
2	Dallas/Fort Worth, United States	549,677
3	Houston (Intercontinental and Hobby, United States) (Note: The official statistics combine both George Bush Intercontinental and Hobby airports.)	506,957
4	Chicago (O'Hare and Midway, United States) (Note: The official statistics combine both O'Hare and Midway airports.)	449,000
5	Atlanta, United States	392,304
6	Montréal–Trudeau, Canada	365,533
7	New York–JFK, United States	354,308
8	Panama City–Tocumen, Panama	291,772
9	Los Angeles, United States	287,945
10	Denver, United States	272,860

== Ground transportation ==
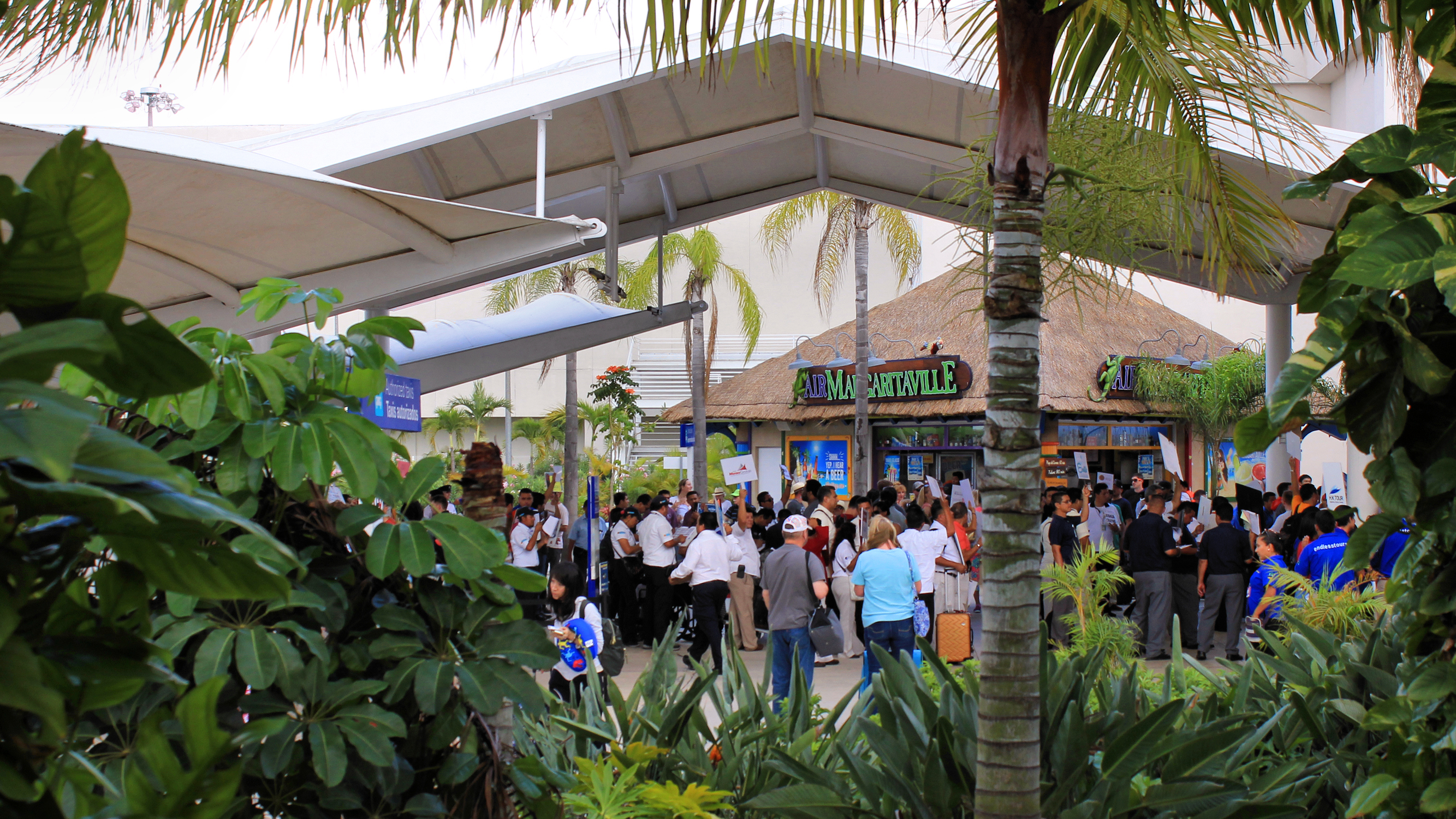
Air Margaritaville bar stand at the ground transportation facility, Terminal 3

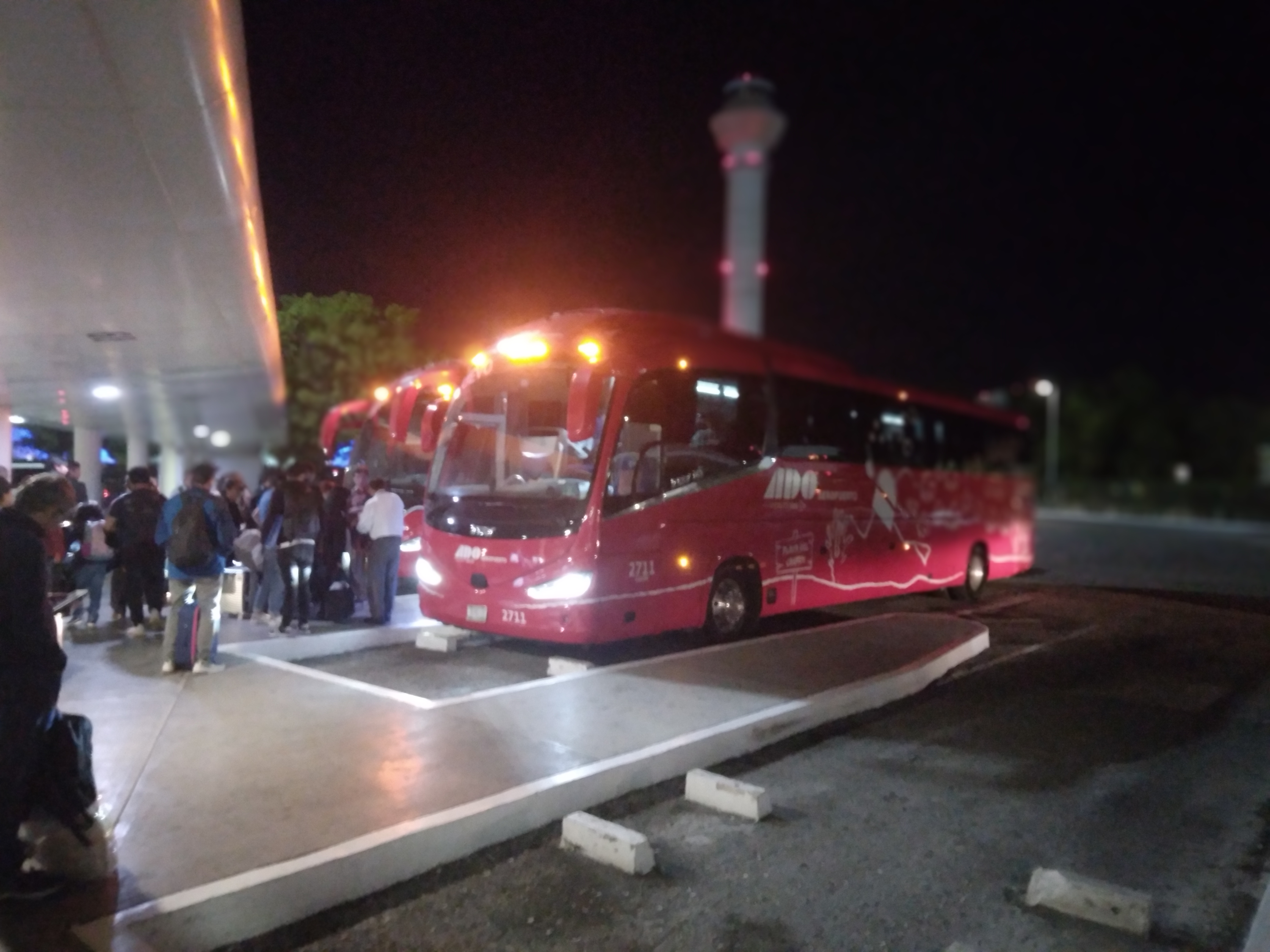
ADO bus platforms at Terminal 2

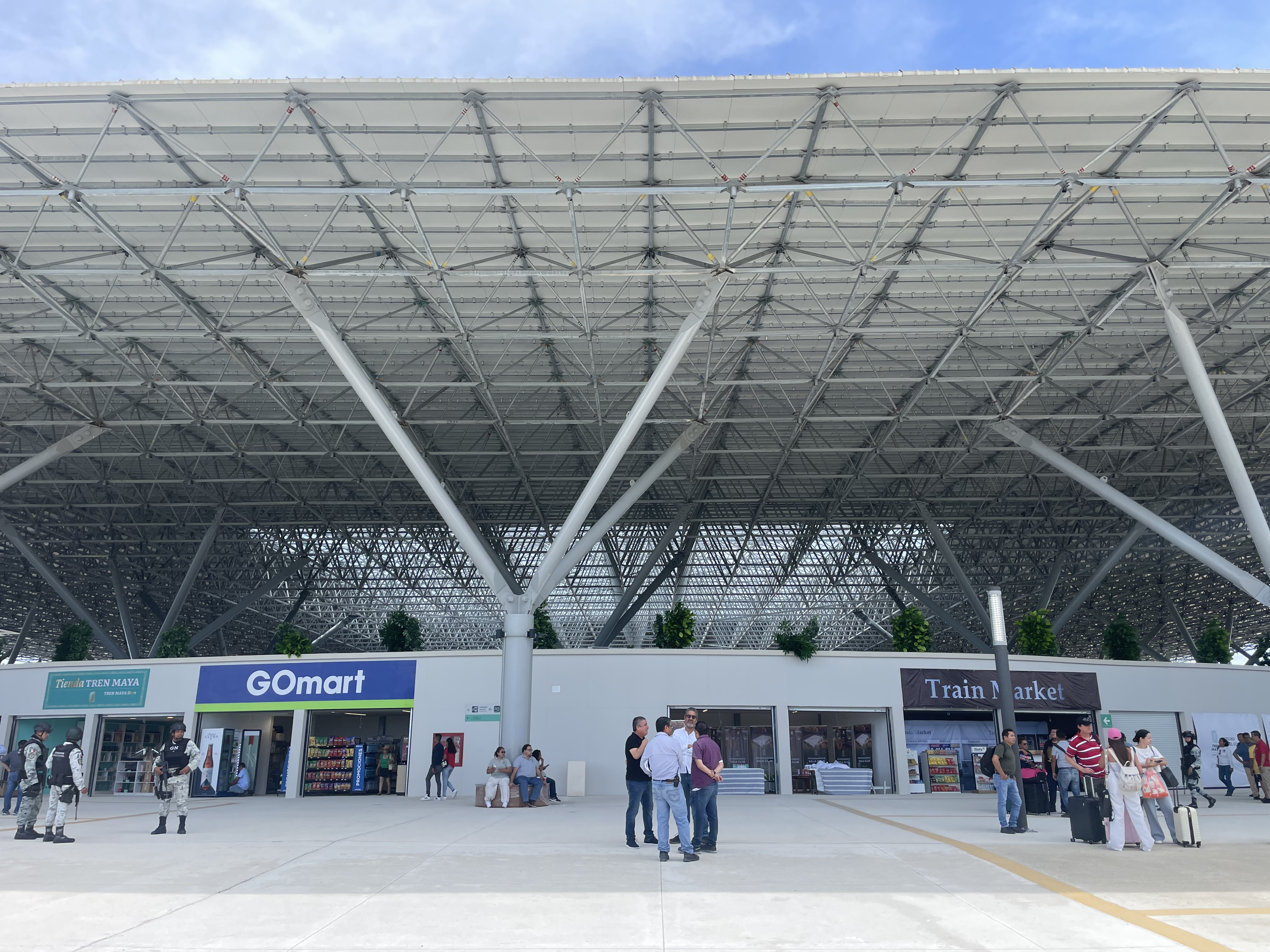
Tren Maya station

The primary mode of transportation to and from the airport is by road. Most travelers pre-arrange ground transport, as local taxis cannot pick up passengers directly at the airport. Official airport taxis operate at premium rates, and many travelers avoid them in favor of pre-booked shuttles or private services. Large short- and long-term parking facilities are available at all terminals.

=== Local shuttles ===
Each terminal includes numbered shuttle platforms and adjacent snack kiosks. These facilities are serviced by various companies offering transportation to and from hotels, with most services offering online booking in advance.

=== Long-distance bus ===
ADO, the primary long-distance bus carrier in southeastern Mexico, serves various destinations, including Cancun, Playa del Carmen, Tulum, and Mérida (with stops at Altabrisa station and Paseo 60 station). It also connects with Cozumel and Chiquilá via coordinated bus and ferry services.

ADO buses stop at all terminals and travel directly to the ADO Bus stations in the specified towns without stopping at hotels or along the route. Coaches seat 44 passengers and include air conditioning and onboard screens.

At Terminal 4, ADO bus tickets are available at rates significantly higher than at other terminals—up to five times more as of 2023. Travelers may find lower fares by purchasing online or boarding at other terminals. The bus stop is located past the ground transportation facility.

=== Train ===
Cancún Airport railway station is located across Federal Highway 180 from Cancún International Airport. The station features nine platforms. It handles services along both the western route, connecting to destinations such as Chichén Itzá, Mérida, and Campeche, and the southern route, which includes stops at Tulum, Tulum Airport, and Chetumal Airport. The Conexión Intermodal Tren Maya is a shuttle bus system linking the airport's four terminals to the railway station.

== Accidents and incidents ==
- On December 26, 1980, a British Aerospace 125 operated by Servicios Aereos Regiomontanos (SARSA) descended into trees on climbout and crashed one kilometer from the airport. All three occupants were killed.
- On March 15, 1984, Aerocozumel Flight 261 crashed soon after takeoff. No one died in the crash, but one passenger died of a heart attack while evacuating the swampy crash scene.
- On September 9, 2009, Mexico City-bound Aeroméxico Flight 576 was hijacked after take off. The hijackers were Bolivians who wanted to speak to the president. The plane landed safely in Mexico City, all hostages were released, and the hijackers were arrested.

== Accolades ==
- 2011 – Best Airport in Latin America – Caribbean of the Airport Service Quality Awards by Airports Council International and 2nd Best Airport by Size in the 5 to 15 million passenger category

== See also ==
- List of the busiest airports in Mexico
- Busiest airports in North America
- Busiest airports in Latin America
- Lists of airports
- Airports in Mexico
- Airfields in Baja California
- Airfields in Baja California Sur
- Small airstrips
- Airports by ICAO code: M
- Military bases
- Air Force bases
- Naval Air bases
- Airlines of Mexico
- Airline destinations: Mexico
- Transportation in Mexico
- Tourism in Mexico
- Federal Civil Aviation Agency
- Grupo Aeroportuario del Sureste
- List of busiest airports by passenger traffic
- List of international airports by country
- List of beaches in Mexico
- List of cities by international visitors
- Riviera Maya
- Caribbean Sea
