= Líneas Aéreas Allegro =

IATA	ICAO	Call sign
LLth	GRO	ALLEGRO
- Founded: 1992; 34 years ago
- Ceased operations: 2004; 22 years ago
- Hubs: Monterrey International Airport
- Headquarters: Monterrey
- Website: http://www.allegro.com.mx (OFFLINE)

Líneas Aéreas Allegro was a scheduled/charter passenger airline from Mexico and the United States, Canada and points in the Caribbean. Allegro Airlines offered 212 domestic and international flights to the U.S. every week.

== Company history ==
Allegro was founded in 1992 by Fernando Padilla, Fernando Martínez, Jose Angel Cardenas, Cap Alejandro J.Martinez, Luis Treviño y Eduardo Alfaro . It operated scheduled and charter passenger flights from Cancún, Quintana Roo, and Mexico City to points in the United States, Canada, the Caribbean, Central America and South America. The home base was in Monterrey, Nuevo León.

Allegro operated until 2004 when it was ordered by a Phoenix court to return all aircraft to the lessors.

== Destinations ==
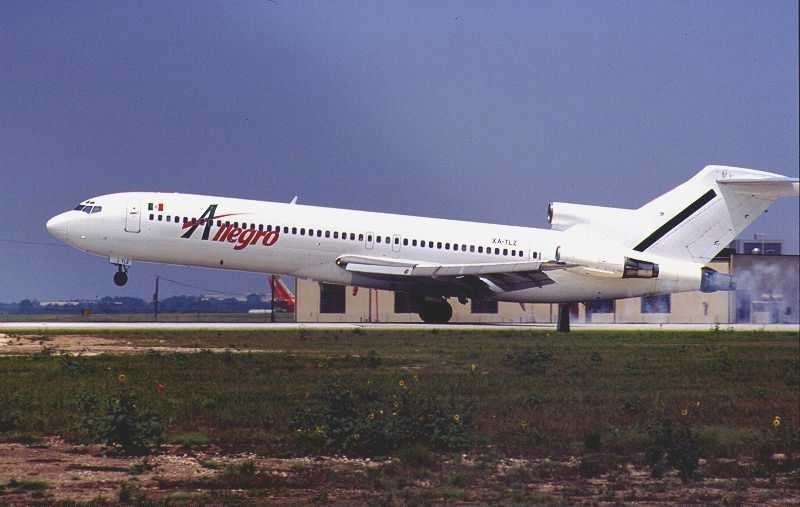
Líneas Aéreas Allegro Boeing 727

- Acapulco
- Atlanta
- Austin/Bergstrom
- Boston
- Calgary
- Cancun
- Chicago/O'Hare
- Chichen Itza
- Cincinnati
- Cleveland
- Dallas/Fort Worth
- Denver
- Fargo
- Guadalajara
- Helena
- Kansas City
- Liberia
- Los Angeles
- Louisville
- Mexico City
- Oakland
- Oklahoma City
- Philadelphia
- Phoenix
- Punta Cana
- Saint John's
- San Francisco
- Tampico
- Tijuana
- Aruba
- St Marteen
- Vancouver

== Fleet details ==
- Operated 25 different Boeing 727-200 throughout its history
- Operated 13 different MD-82 and MD-83 throughout its history
- Operated 3 different Douglas DC-9-14 throughout its history

== Incidents ==
On 5/14/1996 Allegro flight 401, a chartered DC-9 from Orlando, FL to Cancun, Mexico crashed short of the runway while attempting an emergency landing in Tampico, Mexico. There were no fatalities among the 46 occupants but the plane was damaged beyond repair.

- Accident report
