= Líneas Aéreas Azteca =

Mexican airline (2000–2007)

IATA	ICAO	Call sign
ZE	LCD	LINEAS AZTECA
- Founded: 9 May 2000; 26 years ago
- Commenced operations: 1 June 2000; 26 years ago
- Ceased operations: March 2007; 19 years ago
- Hubs: Mexico City International Airport; Gen. Abelardo L. Rodríguez Int'l Airport (Tijuana)
- Focus cities: Miguel Hidalgo y Costilla Int'l Airport (Guadalajara); Gen. Mariano Escobedo Int'l Airport (Monterrey)
- Fleet size: 9
- Destinations: 19
- Parent company: Líneas Aéreas Azteca S.A. de C.V.
- Headquarters: Mexico City, Mexico, Mexico
- Key people: Pablo Francisco Patricio Gonzalez-Ulloa y Gonzalez (President & CEO)

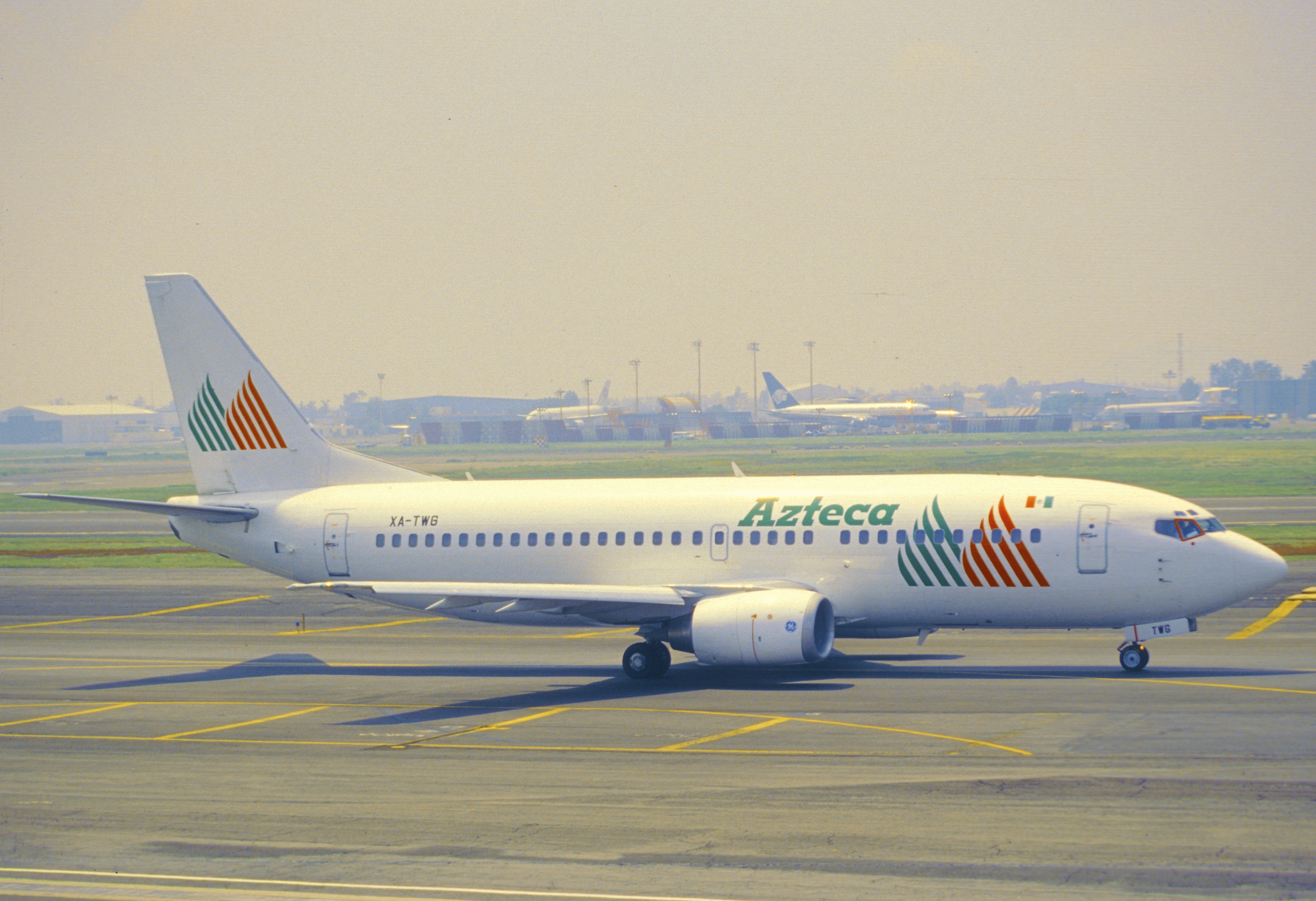
at Mexico City Airport.

Líneas Aéreas Azteca [ˈlineas aˈeɾeas asˈteka] was an airline based in Mexico City, Mexico. It operated domestic scheduled services and international services to the USA. Its main base was Mexico City International Airport, with a hub at Tijuana International Airport, Tijuana.

The airline's operations were suspended by the government in March 2007 due to safety problems, and in October 2007 the Mexican government permanently revoked its air operator's certificate because the company hadn't solved those problems. It was fined US$417,000 for failing to correct the problems or refund airfare for canceled flights to consumers.

== History ==
The airline was established on 9 May 2000 and started operations on 1 June 2000, operating domestic services with Boeing 737 aircraft. It started up after TAESA closed down and some of the staff and assets were taken over.

Under the name Azteca Airlines, the airline was a member of the Airlines Reporting Corporation. Líneas Aéreas Azteca actively sought to expand international routes into the United States. In 2003, Azteca contributed a small amount to traffic through Ontario International Airport, California, constituting ~0.5% of passenger traffic in each of January and October.

During the first two months of 2007, the airline transported 113,592 passengers, or 2.3% of total passengers in Mexico.

=== Operations suspension ===
Following weeks of speculation about the airlines' financial situation, on 26 March 2007, the Secretariat of Communications and Transport of Mexico (SCT) issued a 90-day operations-desist claim that immediately halted the airline's operations, in order for it to respond to its financial credit, personnel training, and aircraft maintenance issues. Following an inspection from 5 to 23 March 2007 that revealed problems with safety procedures and employee training, the airline's operators certification was suspended.

Following the suspension of operations, on 27 March 2007 the International Air Transport Association (IATA) also suspended Líneas Aéreas Azteca from its worldwide Billing and Settlement Plan (BSP).

Routes operated by Azteca were covered by 13 other airlines.

=== End of operations ===
On 10 October 2007, the General Civil Aeronautics Directorship (DGAC) of Mexico's Communications and Transport Secretariat permanently revoked Líneas Aéreas Azteca's air operator's certificate, because the airline did not have a sound financial statement after the previous suspension.

== Destinations served ==
=== Mexico ===
- Acapulco
- Aguascalientes
- Cancún
- Chihuahua
- Ciudad Juárez
- Culiacán
- Guadalajara - Focus city
- Hermosillo
- Mexico City - Hub
- Mexicali
- Monterrey - Focus city
- Morelia
- Oaxaca
- Puebla
- Puerto Vallarta
- Tijuana - Hub
- Toluca
- Uruapan
- Zacatecas

=== United States ===
- California
  - Oakland
  - Ontario
- New York
  - New York City
- Texas
  - Laredo
  - El Paso

== Fleet ==
The Líneas Aéreas Azteca fleet consisted on the following aircraft:

- 3 Boeing 737-700 - XA-AEP, XA-AEQ, XA-TWF
- 6 Boeing 737-300 - XA-AAU, XA-AAV, XA-CAS, XA-TWG, XA-UCL, XA-UCP
