= Tulum Airport railway station =

Train station in Quintana Roo, Mexico

Tulum Airport

General information
- Location: Tulum Municipality, Mexico
- Coordinates: 20.1516°N 87.6399°W
- Platforms: 2
- Tracks: 4

History
- Opening: 20 September 2024

Services
Preceding station	Tren Maya	Following station
Felipe Carrillo Puerto toward Palenque	Tren Maya	Tulum toward Cancún Airport
Location

Tulum Airport is a train station located next to the Tulum International Airport.

== Tren Maya ==
Andrés Manuel López Obrador announced the Tren Maya project in his 2018 presidential campaign. On 13 August 2018, he announced the complete outline. The new Tren Maya put Tulum Airport station on the route connecting Cancún Airport railway station and Escárcega station, Campeche.
