= MAYAir =

Mexican airline

IATA	ICAO	Call sign
7M	MYI	MAYAIR
- Founded: 1994; 32 years ago
- Ceased operations: No Data
- Hubs: Cancún International Airport
- Secondary hubs: Mérida International Airport
- Fleet size: 8
- Destinations: 5
- Headquarters: Cancún, Mexico
- Website: mayair.com.mx

MAYAir is a regional airline based in Cancún, Quintana Roo, Mexico. Its main base is Mérida International Airport.

== History ==
The airline MAYAir was founded in 1994 as a charter airline serving the Yucatán Peninsula. By 2009 it had established itself as an air bridge between Cancun and Cozumel offering six round-trip flights daily. It used German Dornier Do 228 aircraft with a capacity of up to 19 passengers.

The airline based in Cancun expanded its routes over time. MAYAir's destinations were Cancun, Cozumel, Chetumal, Mérida, Villahermosa and Veracruz.

Currently, MAYAir has halted its commercial flight operations as a passenger airline and is only actively offering private air travel services.

== Destinations ==
MAYAir operates the following domestic services (as of May 2022):

- Cancún – Cancún International Airport
- Cozumel – Cozumel International Airport
- Mérida – Mérida International Airport
- Veracruz – Veracruz International Airport
- Villahermosa – Villahermosa International Airport

== Fleet ==
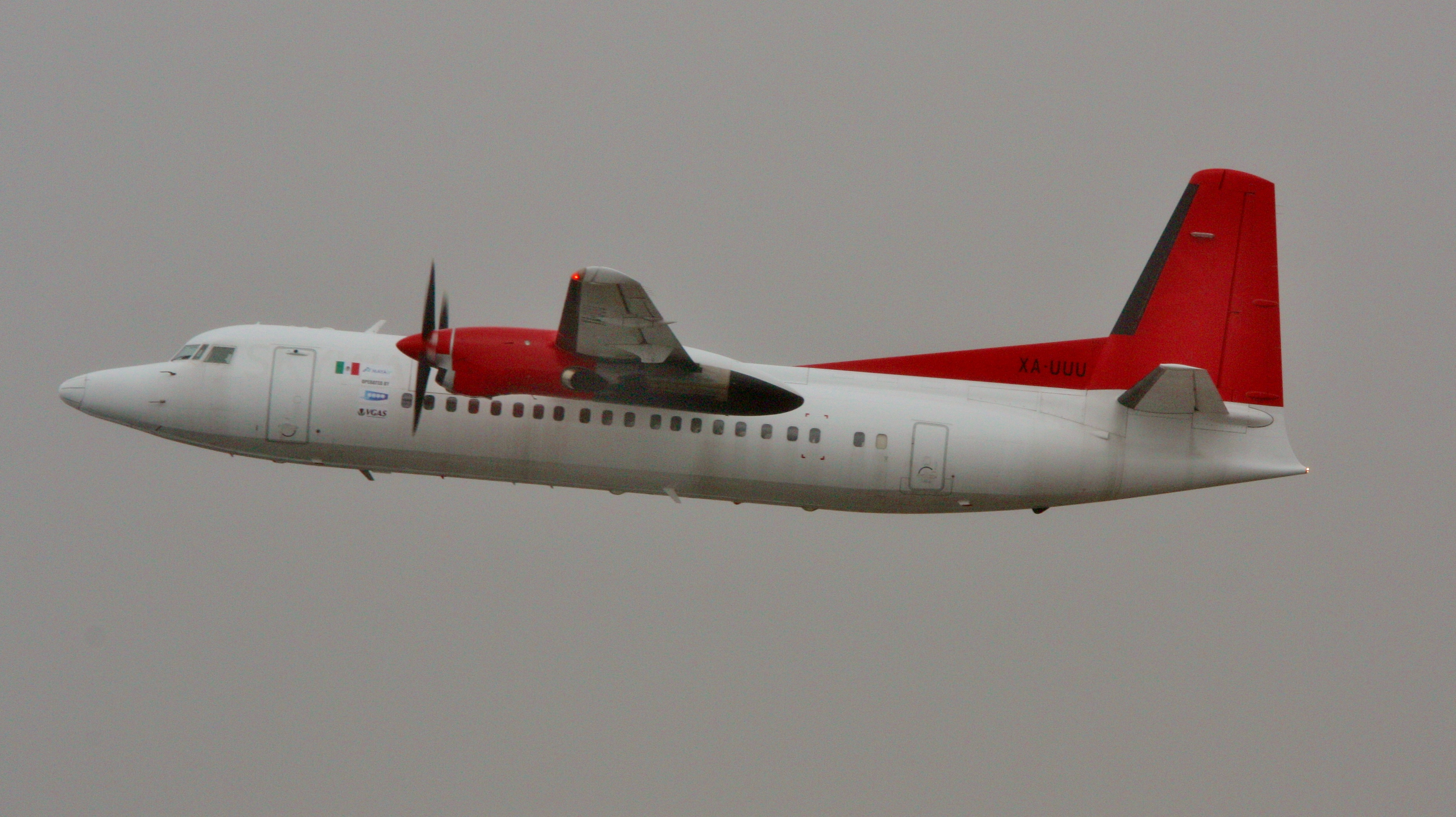
A MAYAir Fokker 50 departing from Sumburgh Airport.

The MAYAir fleet includes the following aircraft (as of March 2023):

Aircraft	Total	Orders	Passengers (Economy)	Notes
Cessna 206	1	—	5	
Cessna 402	1	—	9	
Dornier 228-202K	1	—	19	
Dornier 228-212	2	—	19	
Fokker 50	3	—	50	
Total	8	—		

== Historic Fleet ==
2 Let L-410 Turbolet XA-SYJ XA-SXX
