= Nova Air =

Mexican airline

IATA	ICAO	Call sign
-	PMO	POLAR MEXICO
- Founded: 2005; 21 years ago
- Ceased operations: 2008; 18 years ago
- Hubs: Mexico City International Airport
- Fleet size: 2 (at closure)
- Headquarters: Mexico City, Mexico

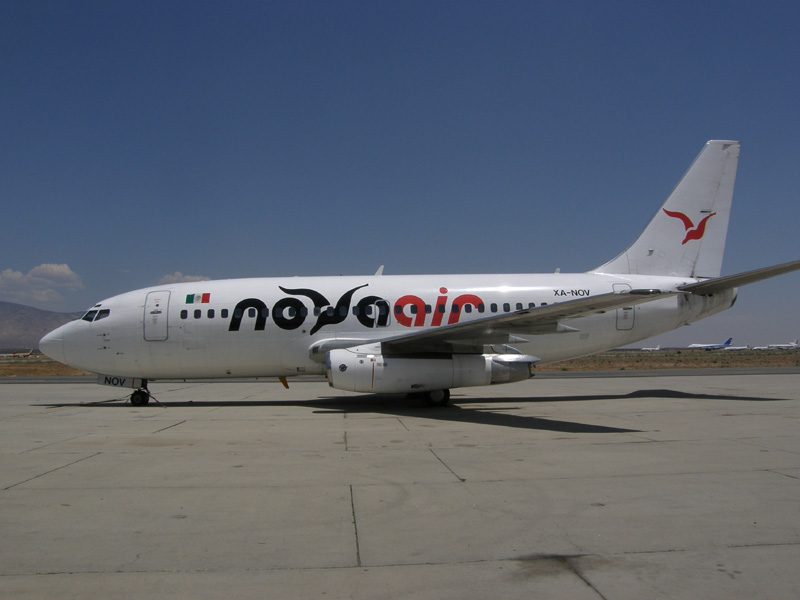
A Nova Air Boeing 737-200 stored at Mojave Airport

Nova Air was an airline based in Mexico City, Mexico. It operated passenger charter services to the Caribbean, Central America and South America out of Mexico City International Airport.

== History ==
Nova Air started operations in 2005 and was owned by Administración Profesional Aeronáutica and Polar Airlines de México. All flights were suspended on August 5, 2008 due to lack of payment of air navigation rights to the Government of Mexico. The airline later resumed operations under the name of Charters Nova Air.

== Fleet ==
Upon closure, the Nova Air fleet consisted of the following aircraft:

- 2 Boeing 737-200
