= Coculum Aeronáutica =

Mexican airline that operated in 1948 to 1962

Coculum Aeronáutica S.A. de C.V. was a Mexican airline that operated from 1948 (78 years ago) to 1962 (64 years ago).

== History ==
The airline was established in 1948 with a fleet of 3 Morane-Saulnier MS-500 Criquets. Latest was incorporated 6 ex-RAF Supermarine Seafire reconverted as three seats executive transport and was commenced to flight to Toluca and in 1951 the MS-500 was replaced by 3 ex-FAM SBD Dauntless converted as passengers aircraft. The SBD's was replaced in 1952 by P-38 Lightning. Lightnings was replaced two years latte by 4 ex-RAF de Havilland Mosquito reconverted as executive transports and the airline was commenced to fly to Cedros, but that route was briefly suspended and the airline was only flown to Toluca. Coculum Aeronáutica ceased operations in April 1962.

== Destinations ==
- Toluca
- Mexico City (base)

== Fleet ==
- 3 de Havilland Mosquito (converted as executive transports)

The airline also was operated a sole a de Havilland Hornet, but quickly was sold
