= Ing. Fernando Espinoza Gutiérrez International Airport =

Defunct airport that served Querétaro, Mexico

Querétaro-Ing. Fernando Espinosa Gutiérrez Airport Aeropuerto Internacional Ing. Fernando Espinosa Gutiérrez
- IATA: ~~QRO~~; ICAO: ~~MMQT~~

Summary
- Airport type: Defunct
- Serves: Querétaro, Querétaro, Mexico
- Opened: 1955
- Closed: 2004
- Time zone: CST (UTC−06:00)
- Coordinates: 20.62447°N 100.368657°W
- Website: www.uaq.mx/campus/index.php/urbanos/aeropuerto/inicio

Map
- Location of the airport in Querétaro ~~QRO~~ (Mexico)

Runways
Direction	Length		Surface
Direction	m	ft	Surface
~~07/25~~	~~1,900~~	~~6,233~~	~~Asphalt~~

Querétaro-Ing. Fernando Espinosa Gutiérrez Airport (Spanish: Aeropuerto Internacional Ing. Fernando Espinosa Gutiérrez) ~~(IATA: QRO, ICAO: MMQT)~~ was an international airport situated in Querétaro, Querétaro, Mexico. It functioned as the primary airport for Querétaro, facilitating both domestic and international flights, in addition to supporting flight training, charter, cargo, and general aviation activities. The airport was named in honor of Fernando Espinosa Gutiérrez, a prominent engineer from Querétaro. It underwent dismantling in 2004, and the remaining facilities were subsequently donated to the Autonomous University of Querétaro, now operating as a university campus. The closest airport currently handling commercial flights is Querétaro Intercontinental Airport.

== History ==
Ing. Fernando Espinosa Gutiérrez Airport had its beginnings in 1955 as a civilian aerodrome. In 1986, the State Government decided to expand and modernize it, granting operational rights to the state-owned entity Aeropuertos y Servicios Auxiliares (ASA). Scheduled commercial flights began in 1992, with airlines like Aerolitoral and TAESA offering flights, and by 1993, Aeromar initiated regular flights. It received the official designation as an International Airport in 1997, serving 110,000 passengers and accommodating 11,000 operations by 2003.

In the 1990s, there were efforts to establish Querétaro, alongside Toluca, Cuernavaca, and Puebla airports, as alternatives to alleviate air traffic congestion in the Mexico City Area. In 1999, preparations started for the construction of a new airport, situated 19 kilometres (12 mi) to the east of the old facilities. The construction process kicked off on July 12, 2002, and the new Querétaro Intercontinental Airport commenced operations on November 28, 2004. After its inauguration, several airlines, including Aeromar and Continental Express, transferred their flight services to the new airport, along with the IATA and ICAO airport codes. Following its operational phase, the airport underwent dismantling and was subsequently donated to the Autonomous University of Querétaro.

== See also ==
- List of the busiest airports in Mexico
- List of airports in Mexico
- List of airports by ICAO code: M
- List of busiest airports in North America
- List of the busiest airports in Latin America
- Transportation in Mexico
- Tourism in Mexico
- Querétaro Aerospace Cluster
- Autonomous University of Querétaro
