= RCQ =

RCQ may refer to:

- Reconquista Airport (IATA: RCQ), an airport serving Reconquista, Santa Fe Province, Argentina
- Regional Cargo (ICAO: RCQ), a defunct Mexican cargo airline
