= Querétaro Intercontinental Airport =

International airport serving Querétaro, Mexico

Querétaro Intercontinental Airport Aeropuerto Intercontinental de Querétaro
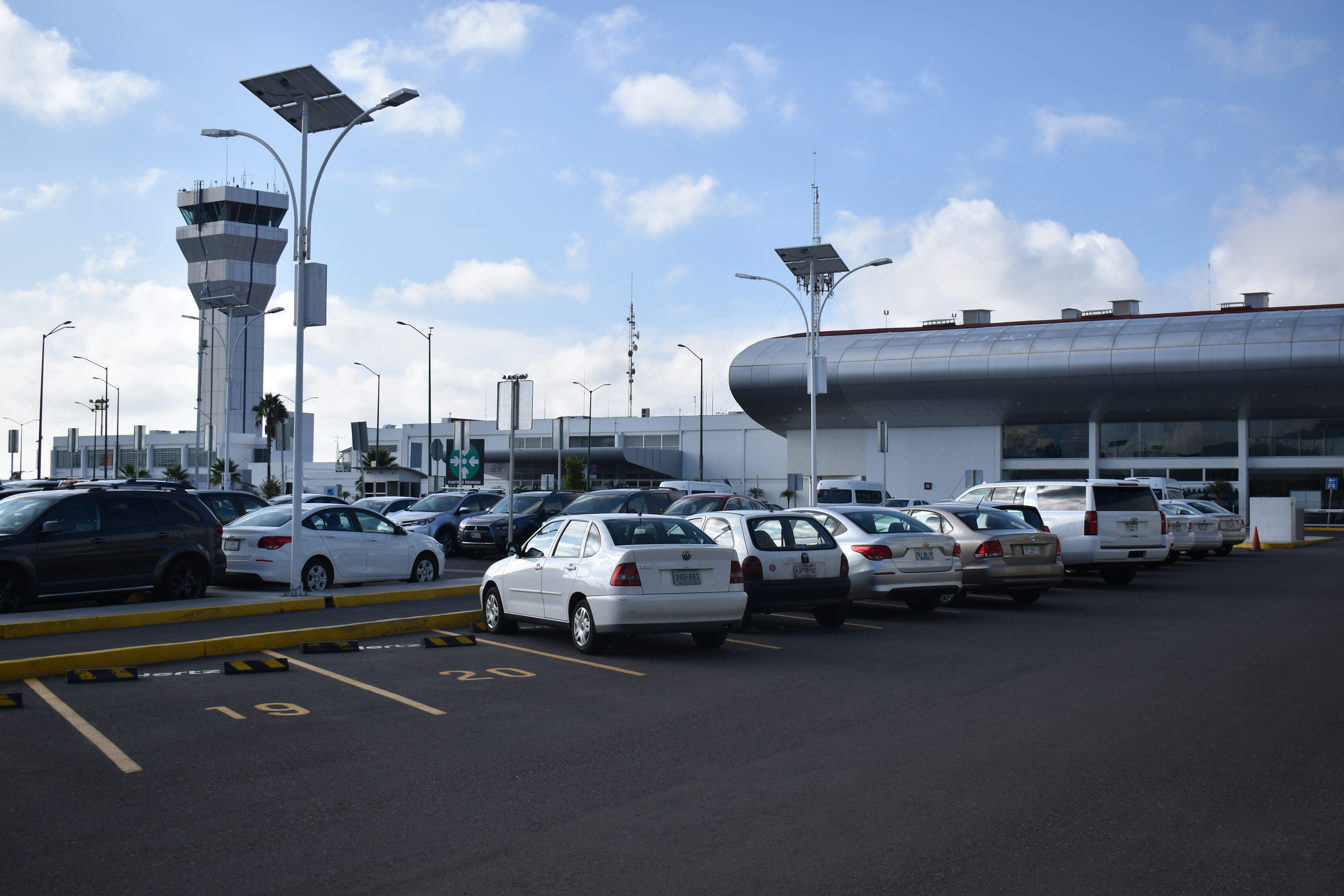
- IATA: QRO; ICAO: MMQT

Summary
- Airport type: Public
- Owner/Operator: State of Queretaro Government
- Serves: Querétaro, Querétaro, Mexico
- Location: Colón and El Marqués
- Opened: 28 November 2004; 21 years ago
- Hub for: TAR Aerolíneas
- Time zone: CST (UTC-06:00)
- Elevation AMSL: 1,969 m (6,460 ft)
- Coordinates: 20°37′02.5″N 100°11′08.4″W
- Website: www.aiq.com.mx

Map
- Location of the airport in Querétaro QRO (Mexico)

Runways
| Direction | Length | | Surface |
| Direction | m | ft | Surface |
|---|---|---|---|
| 09/27 | 3,500 | 11,483 | Concrete |

Statistics (2025)
- Total passengers: 2,409,429
- Ranking in Mexico: 11th ▲3
- Source: Agencia Federal de Aviación Civil

Querétaro Intercontinental Airport (Spanish: Aeropuerto Intercontinental de Querétaro) (IATA: QRO, ICAO: MMQT) is an international airport located in the municipalities of Colón and El Marqués, Querétaro, Mexico. It handles the national and international air traffic of the Querétaro Metropolitan area and can function as an alternate airport to Mexico City International Airport. It replaced the Ing. Fernando Espinoza Gutiérrez International Airport, which is no longer operational.

Querétaro Airport serves as the main hub for the regional airline TAR Aerolíneas and provides passenger flights to various cities in Mexico, as well as international services to the United States. Additionally, the airport plays a significant role as a hub for cargo flights, offering services to Mexico, the United States, and Europe. Previously, the now-defunct cargo airline Regional Cargo was headquartered on the airport premises. Moreover, Querétaro Airport is home to the Querétaro Aerospace Cluster, which has rapidly grown into a major hub for aerospace activities in Mexico.

Querétaro Intercontinental Airport has experienced significant growth, rising from 41st to 11th position among Mexico's busiest airports in the space of fifteen years. In 2024, it handled 2,074,950 passengers, surpassing the two million threshold for the first time. This figure increased to 2,409,429 in 2025. Furthermore, the airport ranks among the top ten in Mexico for international passenger traffic, and it is the fifth-largest in the country for cargo operations.

== History ==
=== Background ===
Querétaro's previous airport, Ing. Fernando Espinosa Gutiérrez Airport, had its beginnings in 1955 as a civilian aerodrome. In 1986, the State Government decided to expand and modernize it, granting operational rights to the state-owned entity "Aeropuertos y Servicios Auxiliares" (ASA). Scheduled commercial flights began in 1992, with airlines like Aerolitoral and TAESA offering flights, and by 1993, Aeromar initiated regular flights. It received the official designation as an International Airport in 1997, serving 110,000 passengers and accommodating 11,000 operations by 2003.

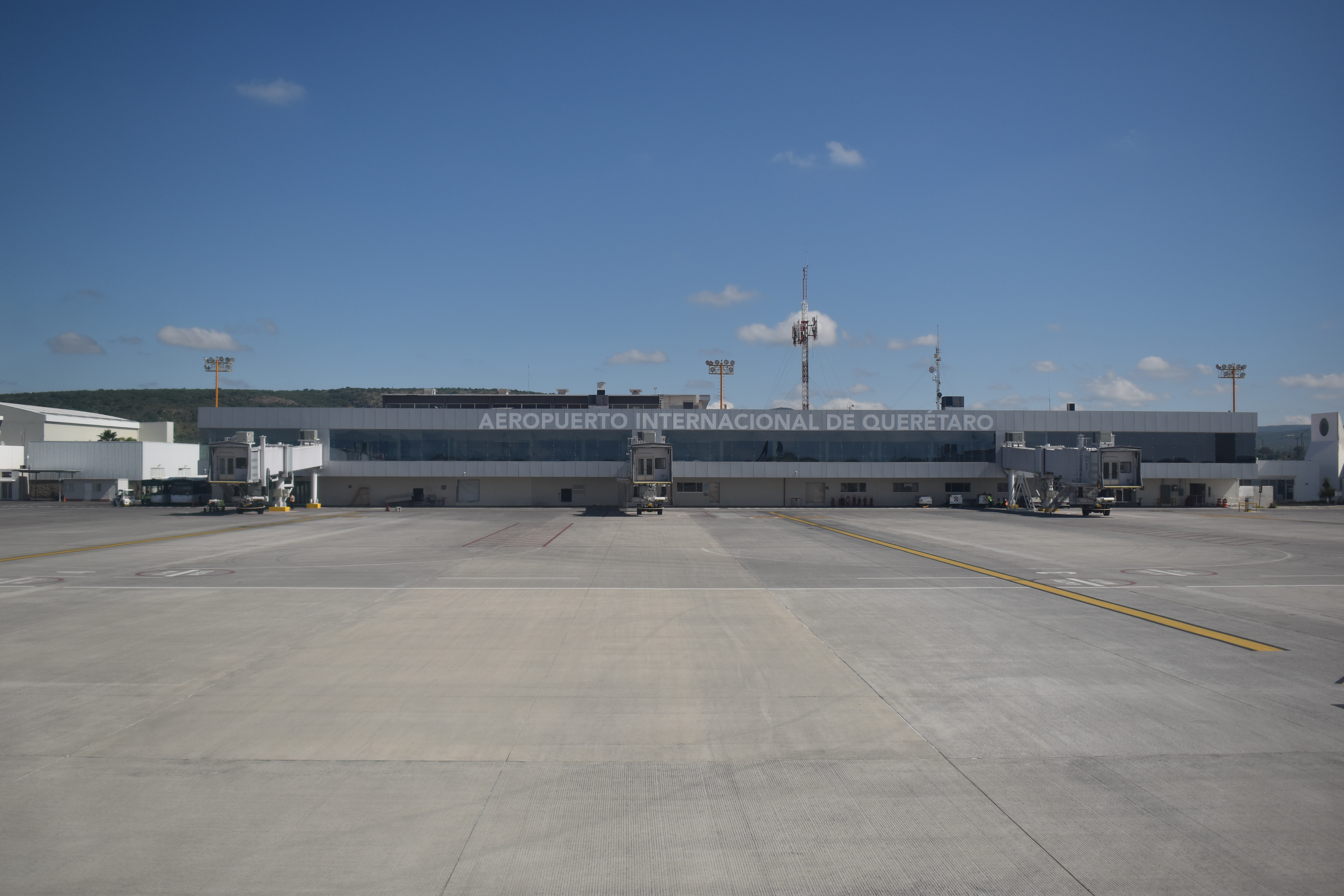
Passenger terminal airside

In the 1990s, there were efforts to establish Querétaro, alongside Toluca, Cuernavaca, and Puebla airports, as alternatives to alleviate air traffic congestion in the Mexico City Area. In 1999, preparations started for the construction of a new airport, situated 12 minutes (19 km) to the east of the old facilities. The construction process kicked off on July 12, 2002, and the new Querétaro Intercontinental Airport commenced operations on November 28, 2004. After its inauguration, several airlines, including Aeromar and Continental Express, introduced flight services at the airport. Querétaro Airport had the advantage of being the closest airport to the metropolis capable of handling large aircraft while situated at a lower elevation than other alternatives. This attribute made the airport an attractive location for developing a cargo hub that could efficiently serve the entire Central Mexico region, which encompasses a population of 30 million inhabitants.

=== Cargo operations ===
In 2006, construction began on the Air Cargo Terminal at Querétaro Airport, making it unique in Mexico as it incorporates a specialized area for national cargo, offering services such as a Specialized Enclosure and Customs. This development led to a 50.5% increase in cargo movement at the airport compared to 2005. In October 2007, two cargo airlines, Regional Cargo based in Querétaro, and BAX Global, a subsidiary of the cargo consolidator Schenker, initiated operations. This marked a significant rise in pure cargo movement, with the first airline operating an ATR 42 and a Boeing 737-200C. BAX Global's cargo route extended to Toledo, Ohio, making it the first international cargo airline to operate from the airport.

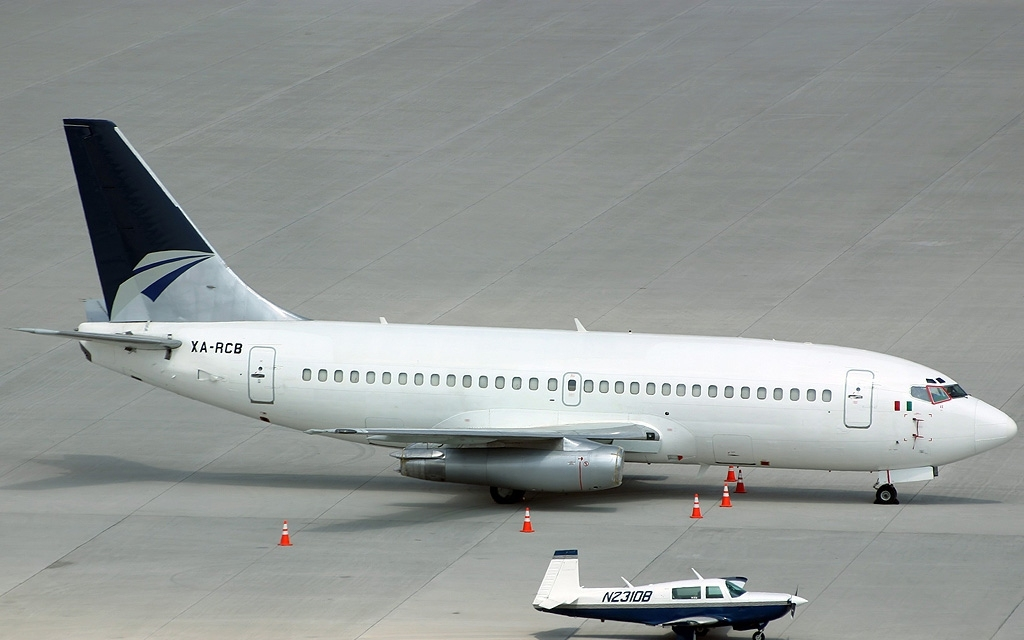
Regional Cargo Boeing 737-274C at QRO

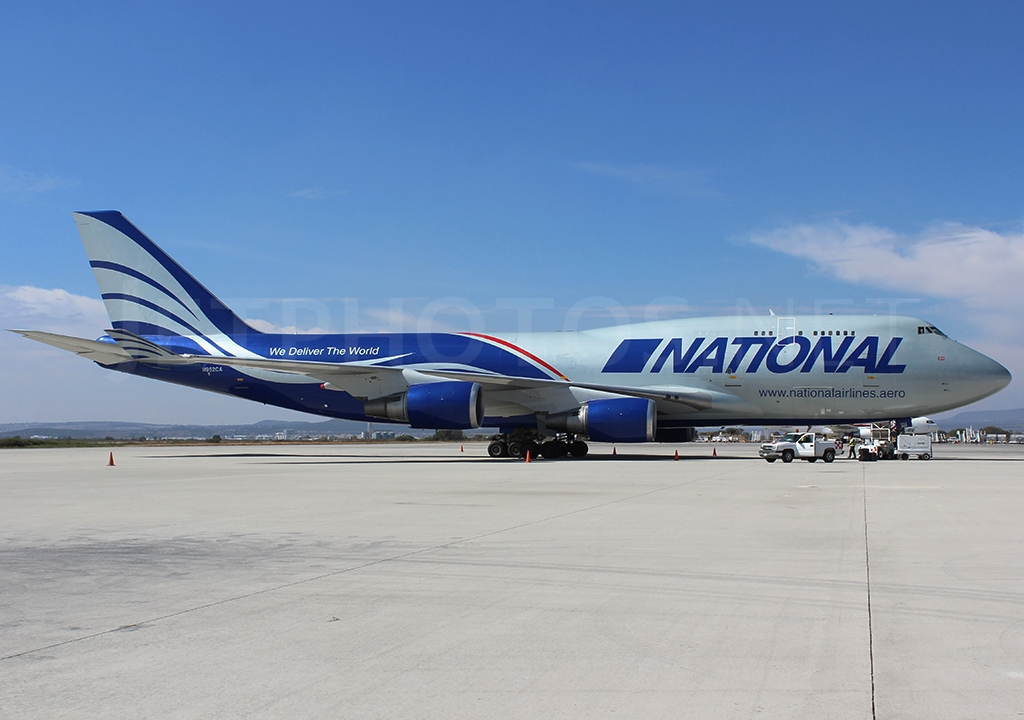
National Airlines Boeing 747-428 at QRO

FedEx began operations in October 2011, introducing regular flights to its World Hub in Memphis, Tennessee, using a Boeing 727 with a 22-ton capacity, later upgrading to a larger-capacity Boeing 757. In 2012, DHL initiated operations using a Boeing 767 from ABX Air, equipped with a 42-ton capacity, on the route Querétaro-Guadalajara-Cincinnati. Furthermore, Aeronaves TSM, an aviation company based in Saltillo, established its maintenance hangar at the airport's facilities.

=== Other operations ===
In 2012, Aeromexico and Delta Air Lines jointly announced their plans to establish a maintenance base at Querétaro International Airport. Subsequently, in 2015, American Eagle introduced flights to Dallas-Fort Worth. Initially, these flights were operated by Mesa Airlines, utilizing Bombardier CRJ900 aircraft. However, in 2017, Envoy took over operations from Mesa Airlines, employing a new fleet of Embraer 175 aircraft. Later in the same year, American Airlines assumed operations from Envoy and introduced two daily flights using Boeing 737 aircraft. In November 2016, Torreón and Chihuahua were added as additional destinations due to flights operated by TAR. In June 2017, Viva commenced flights to Cancún and Monterrey. During the same year, Volaris introduced flights to Los Angeles and Chicago-Midway. Nevertheless, the Los Angeles route concluded on March 28, 2018, and Chicago-Midway was replaced by Chicago-O'Hare in June 2019.

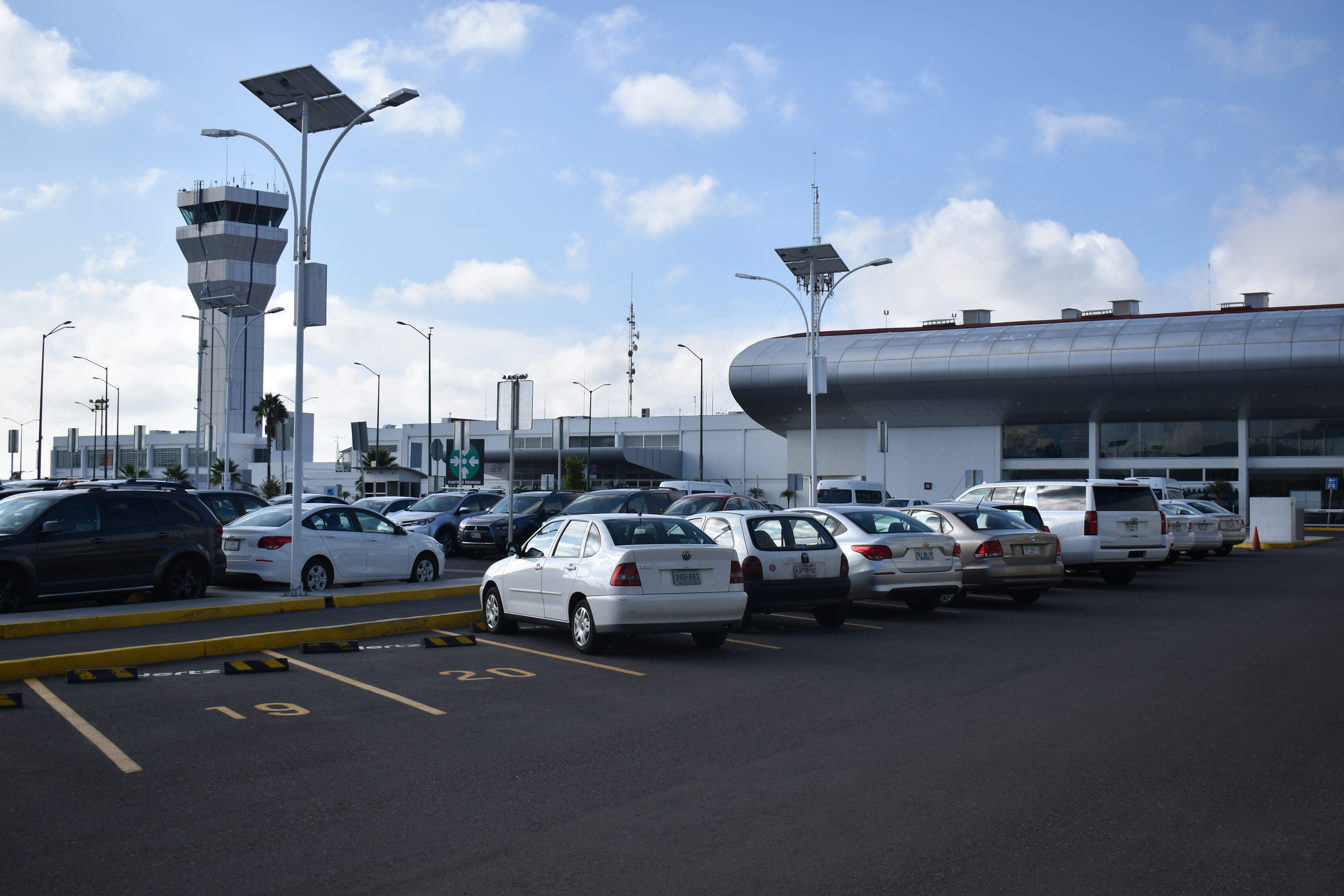
Querétaro Intercontinental Airport exterior from the car rental area

The airport has consistently experienced growth. However, due to the increasing centralization of air traffic in Mexico City, many travelers heading to Querétaro still prefer to use Mexico City International Airport, which is approximately 150 kilometres (93 mi) southeast of the city and well-connected through highways and bus services. Despite its potential to serve a region with nearly 5,000,000 people within a 100 kilometres (62 mi) radius, Querétaro Airport's capacities are not fully utilized. Additionally, the opening of the Mexico City-Felipe Angeles Airport (Mexico City-AIFA) in 2022 poses potential challenges for Querétaro in attracting new commercial flights. Nevertheless, in 2023, Aeromexico announced plans for a flight to Detroit, and Viva revealed flights to Houston-Intercontinental and San Antonio.

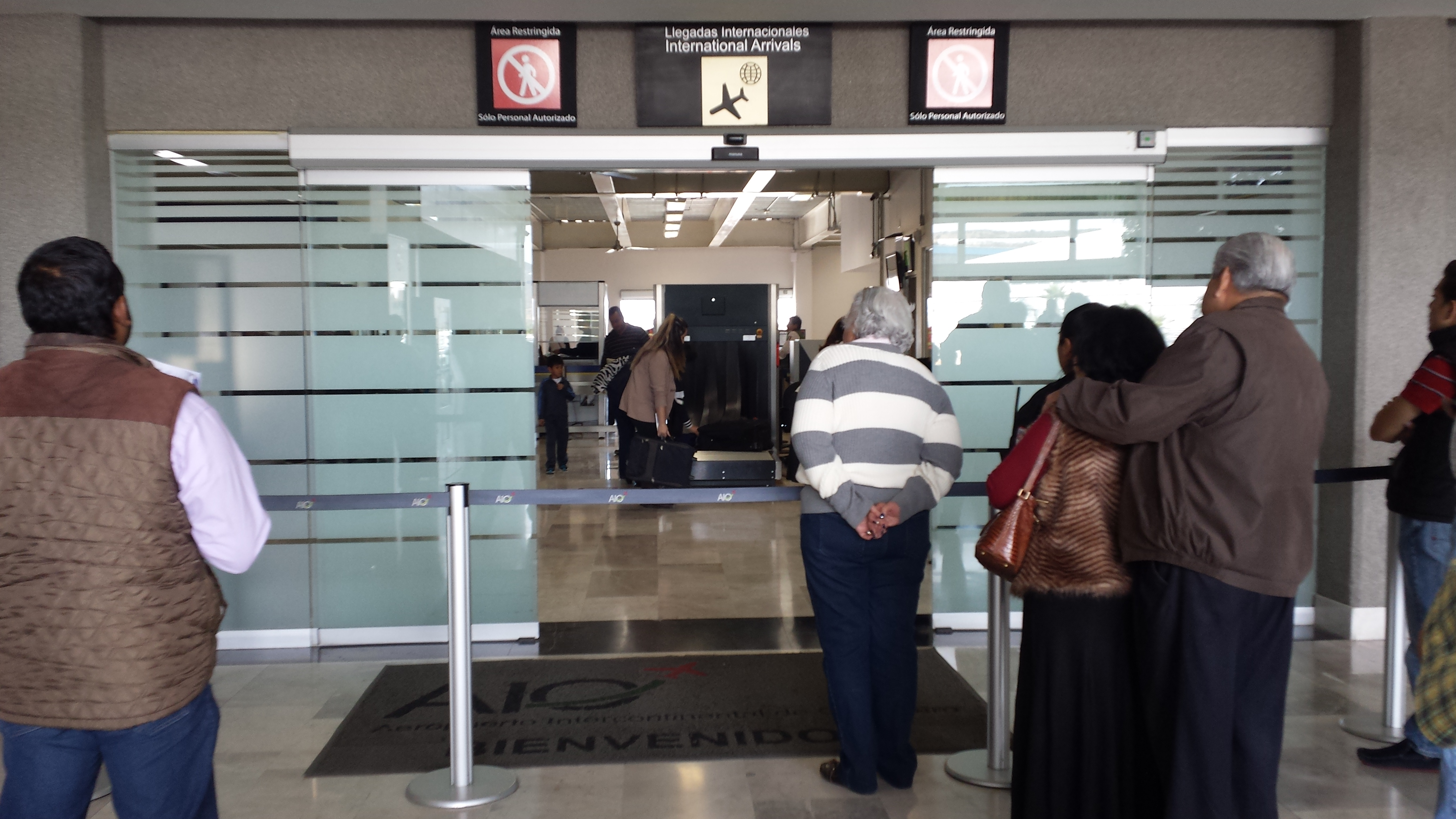
Terminal entrance

== Facilities ==
The airport is situated at an elevation of 1,969 metres (6,460 ft) above mean sea level, covering a total land area of 688 hectares (1,700 acres). It is equipped to handle up to 45 operations per hour and operates 24 hours a day, 365 days a year, experiencing minimal weather-related closures (less than 0.5%). The airport features a concrete runway that spans 3,500 metres (11,500 ft) in length and 45 metres (148 ft) in width. Its apron serves various purposes, catering to commercial, general, and cargo operations, and it can accommodate a total of 47 aircraft, occupying a combined surface area of 174,400 square metres (1,877,000 sq ft). Five parking positions are currently designated for commercial flights. The control tower stands at a height of 42 metres (138 ft), and there is space available for 60 hangars.

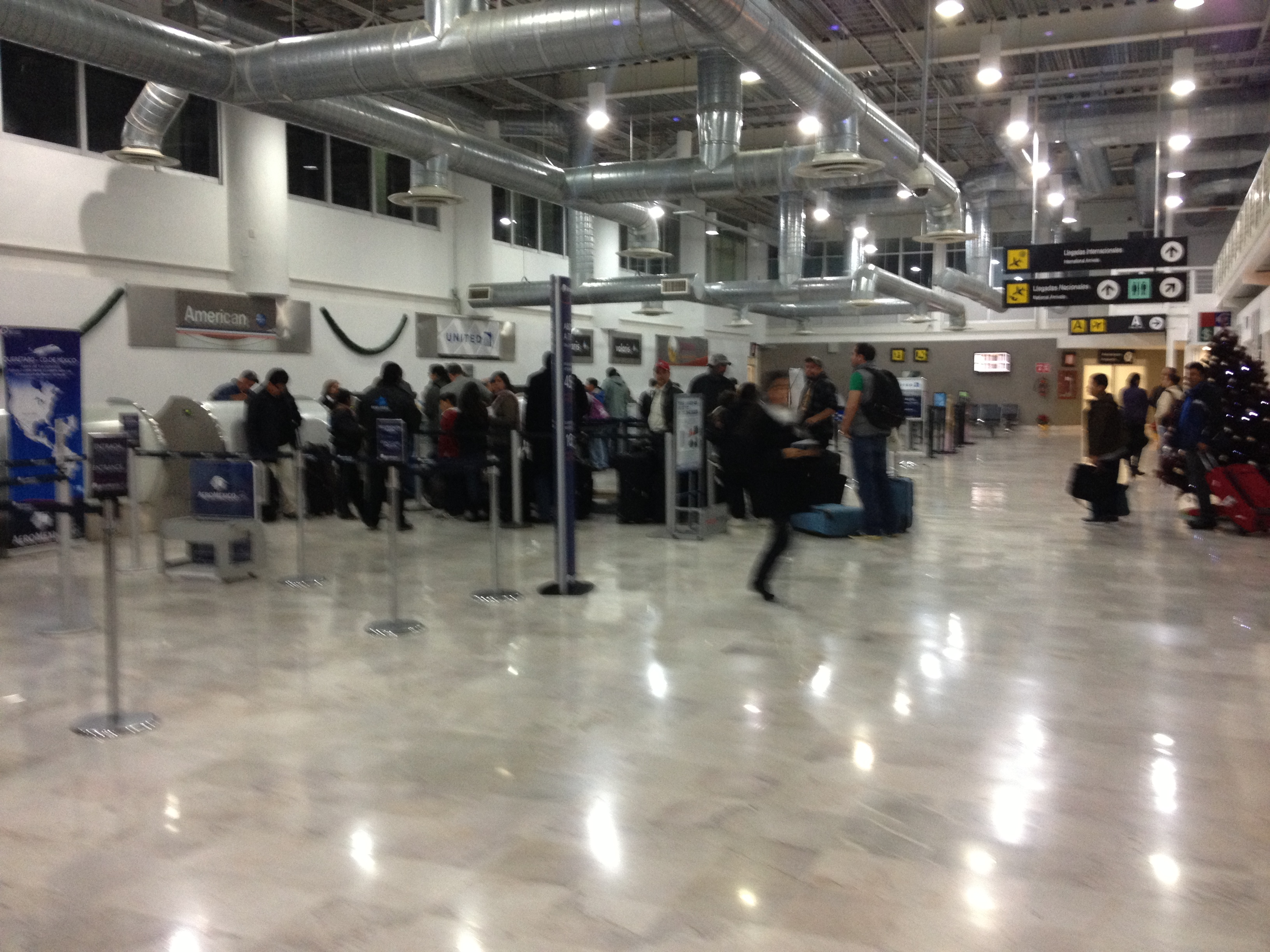
Check-in area

The passenger terminal spans an area of 1,383 square metres (14,890 sq ft) and can serve up to 400 passengers per hour. The ground floor includes a check-in area, and the arrivals area that features customs and immigration facilities, baggage claim areas, and an arrivals hall offering car rental services, taxi stands, snack bars, and souvenir shops. In 2018, significant renovations were carried out on the passenger terminal, resulting in the addition of a second floor. This new floor now houses a departures concourse with five gates, three of which are equipped with jet bridges.

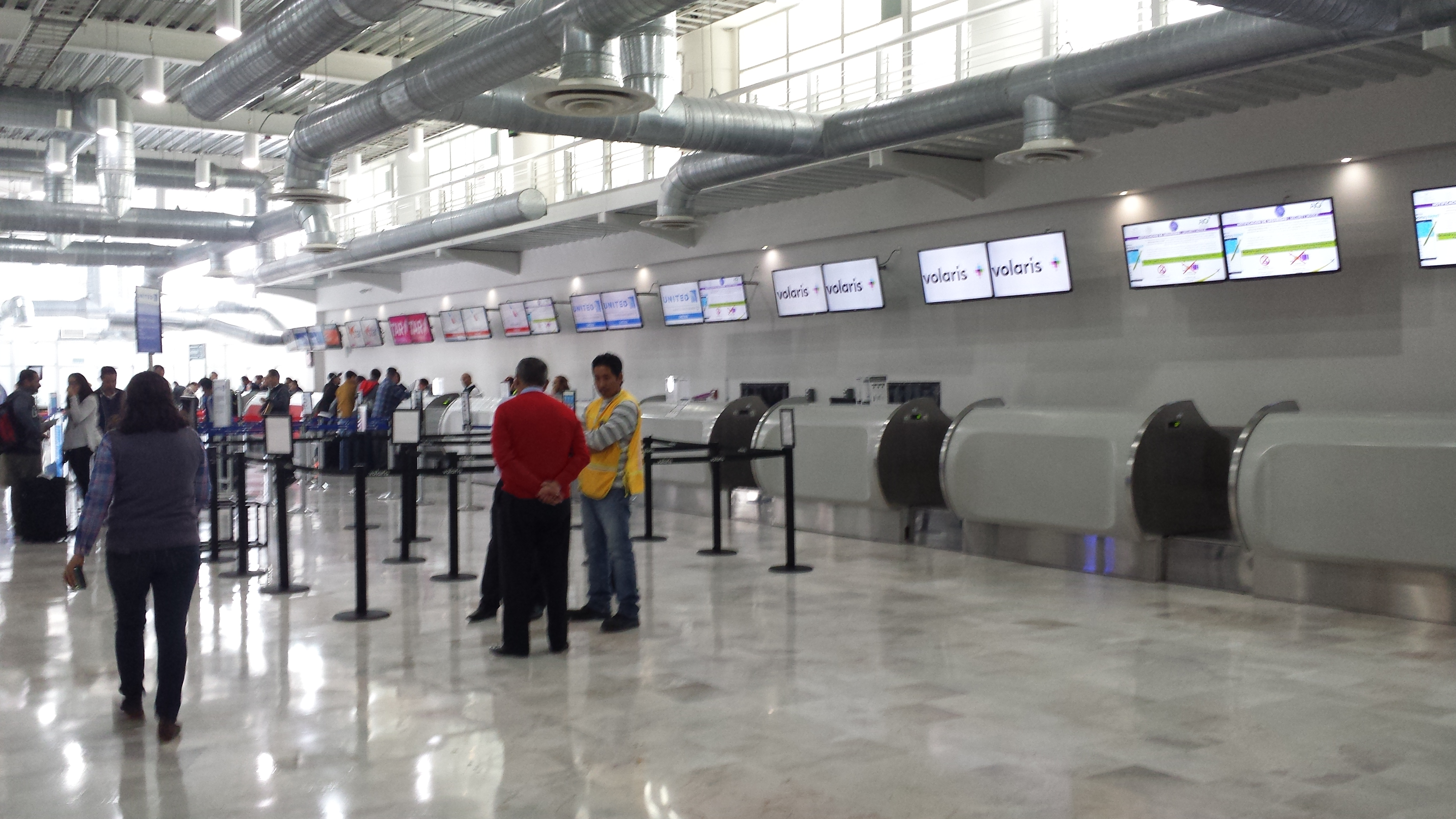
Check-in counters at the airport

The Querétaro Intercontinental Airport is home to several significant cargo facilities, with major tenants including well-known companies such as DHL, FedEx, UPS, and Aeronaves TSM. Furthermore, the airport hosts the largest Aircraft Maintenance, Repair, and Overhaul (MRO) company in Mexico, and it is the second-largest in Latin America. These MRO facilities primarily focus on the maintenance of narrow-body and regional jet aircraft. Additionally, there are industrial parks in the vicinity of the airport that support the aerospace industry activities taking place at the airport.

== Querétaro Aerospace Cluster ==
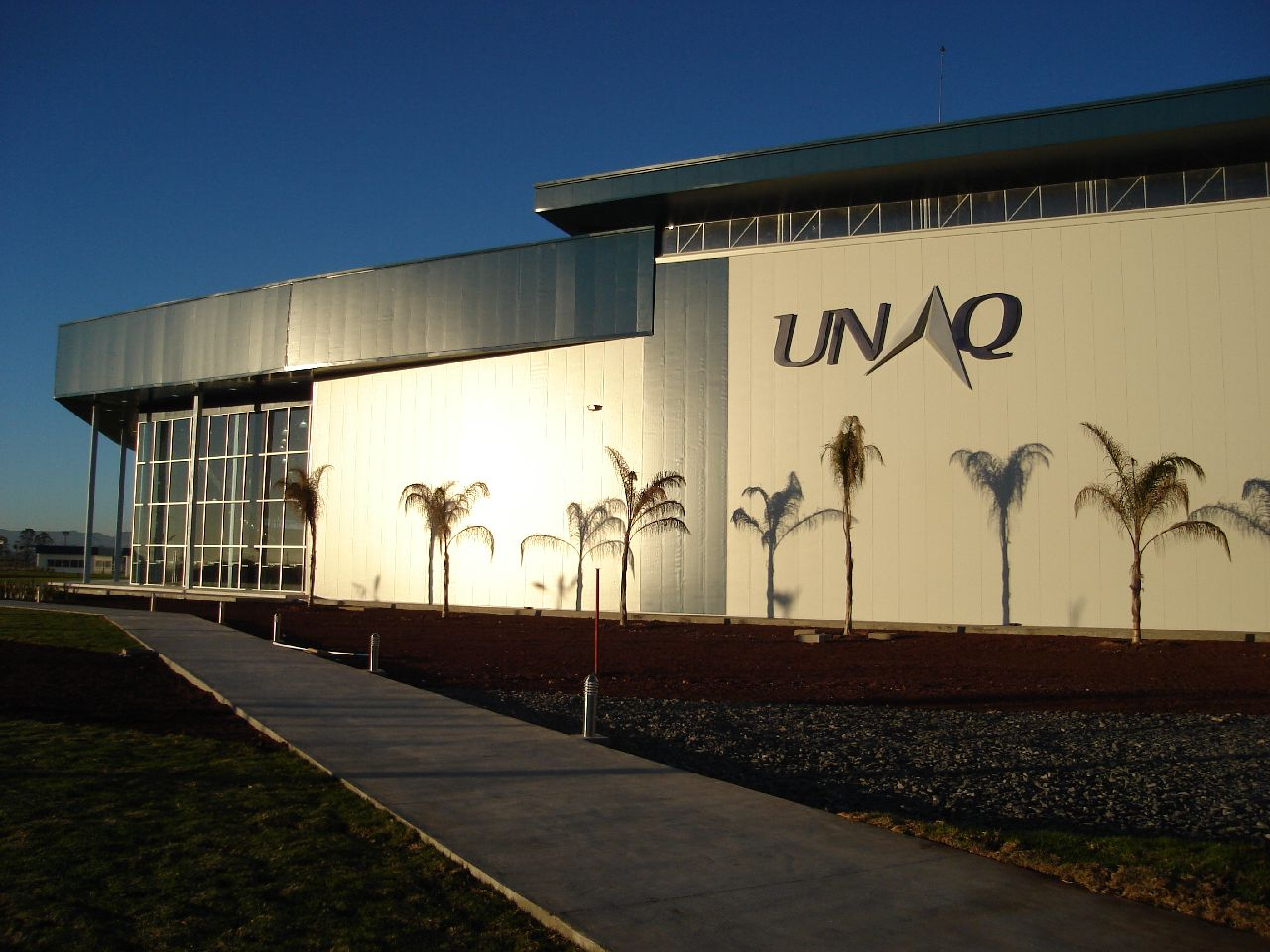
Aeronautical University in Querétaro facilities

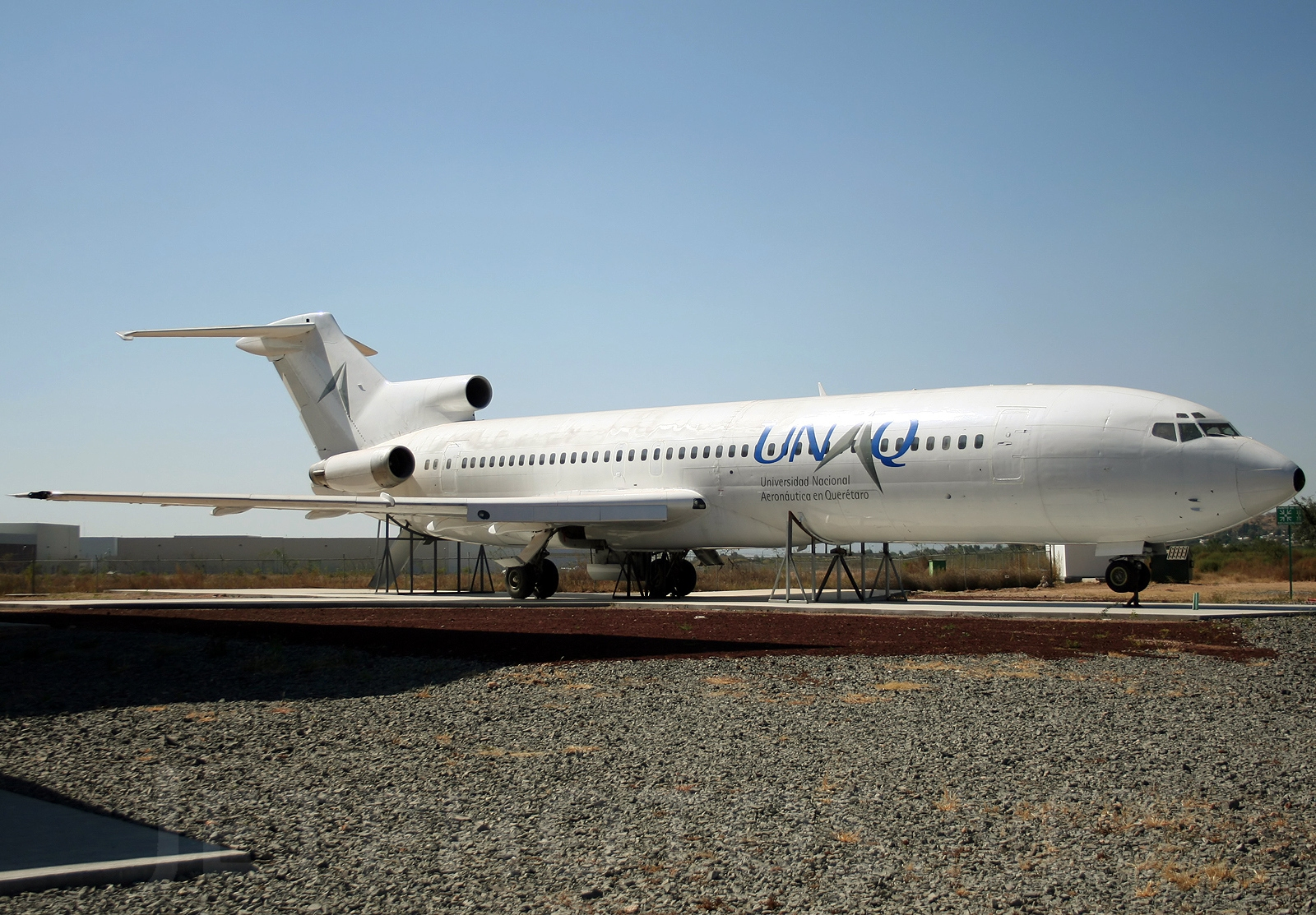
Boeing 727-223 at the Aeronautical University in Querétaro

In 2012, eight years after the inauguration of Querétaro's Intercontinental Airport, a consortium of multinational corporations, including Airbus, Delta, and Bombardier, collaborated with local entrepreneurs, research centers, and educational institutions to establish an innovation cluster aimed at fostering growth in the aerospace industry. Bombardier, which had previously set up a manufacturing facility in Mexico in 2006, played a crucial role in this initiative. They established a state-of-the-art facility in Querétaro, where highly skilled teams are engaged in the production of vital structural components for their leading business jets. This includes the manufacturing of the rear fuselage for all Global aircraft models and components for various aircraft models, such as the Learjet 85, Challenger 605, CRJ700/CRJ900/CRJ1000 NextGen, Q400 NextGen, and Global 6000/7000 aircraft.

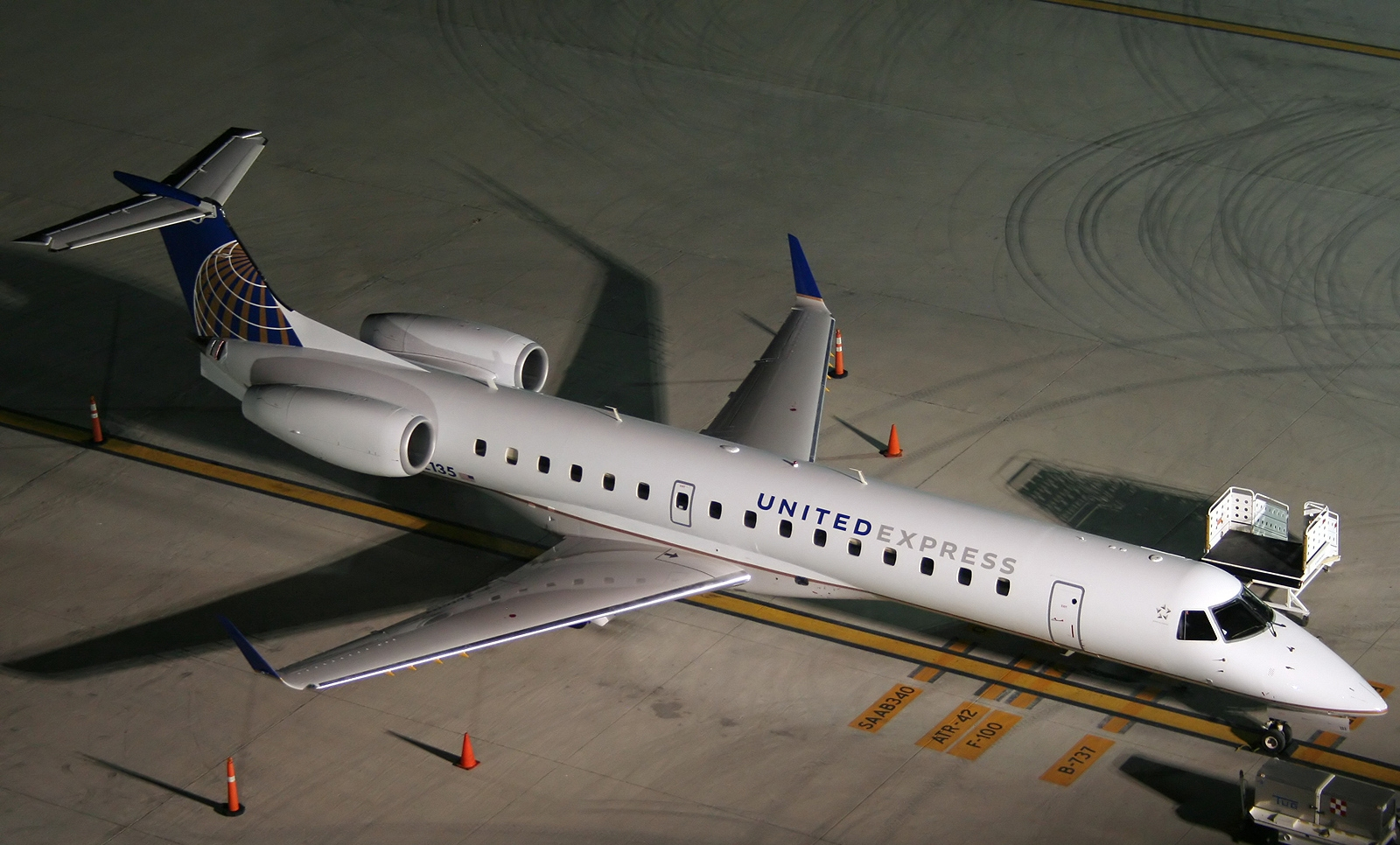
United Express Embraer ERJ-145LR at QRO

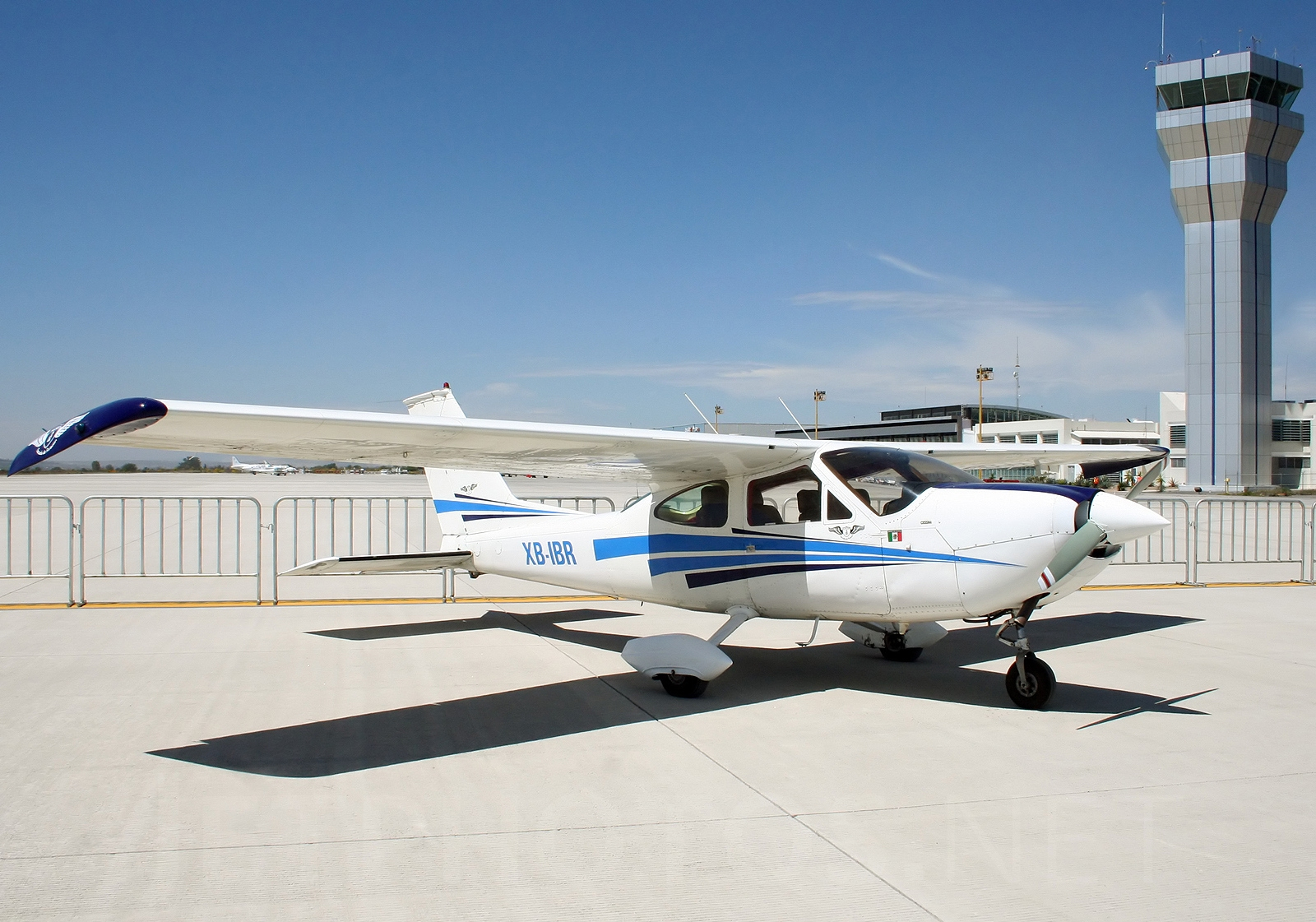
Cessna 177 Cardinal at QRO

In 2007, the Aeronautical University in Querétaro (Spanish: Universidad Aeronáutica en Querétaro) was founded, becoming the country's sole university specializing in the aerospace industry. This educational institution plays a pivotal role in nurturing talent and expertise in the aerospace sector. Over recent years, Querétaro's aerospace industry has experienced consistent growth, establishing itself as a key hub for aerospace manufacturing and innovation.

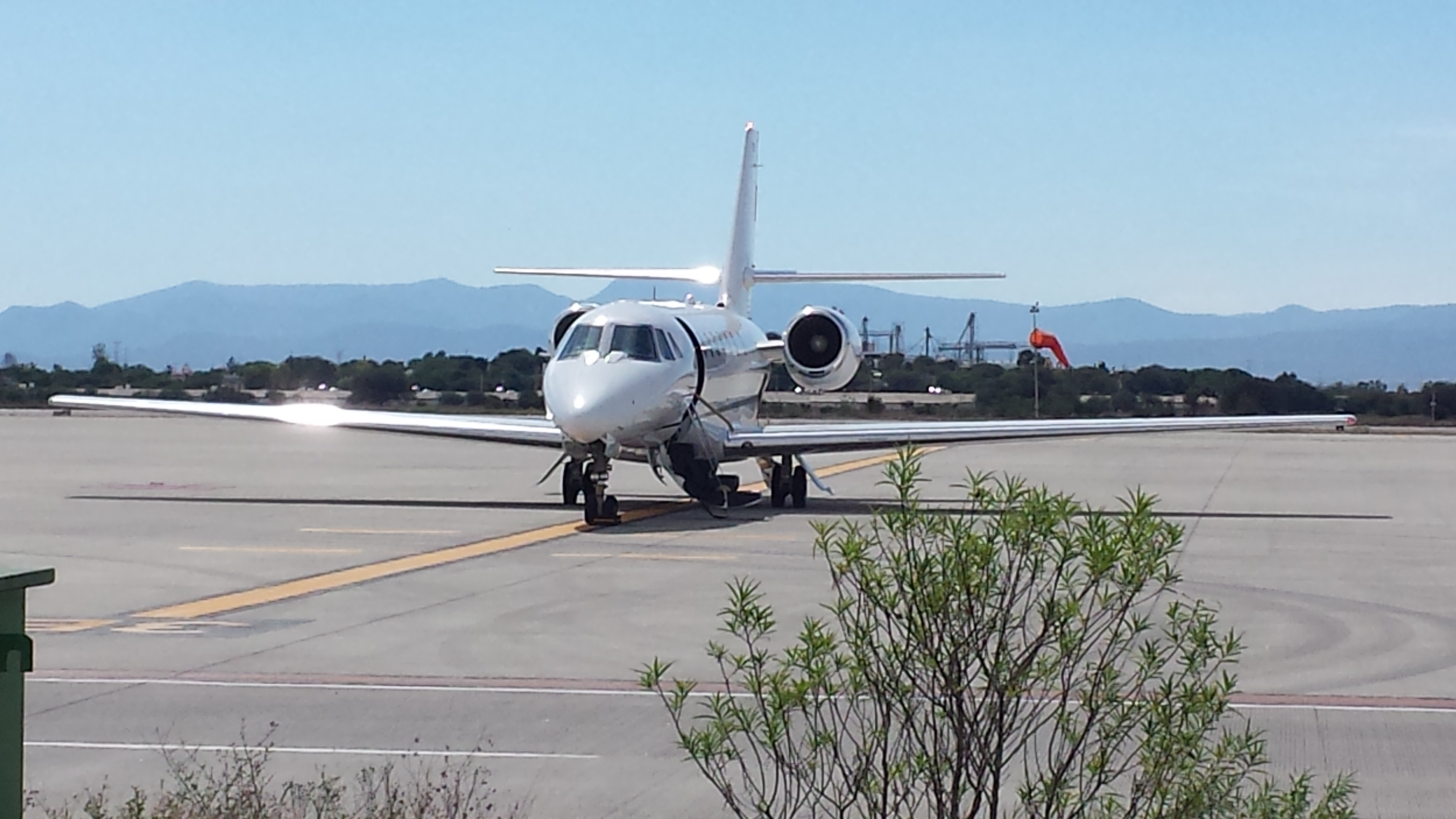
Executive plane at the airport

== Airlines and destinations ==
=== Passenger ===
| Airlines | Destinations |
|---|---|
| Aeroméxico | Mexico City–Benito Juárez |
| Aeroméxico Connect | Atlanta, Detroit, Mexico City–Benito Juárez |
| American Airlines | Dallas/Fort Worth; Seasonal: Chicago–O'Hare |
| Iberojet | Madrid |
| TAR México | Acapulco, Chihuahua, Ciudad Juárez, Hermosillo, La Paz, Mazatlán, Torreón/Gómez Palacio |
| United Airlines | Houston–Intercontinental |
| United Express | Houston–Intercontinental |
| Viva | Cancún, Dallas/Fort Worth, Houston–Intercontinental, Mérida, Monterrey, San Antonio, San José del Cabo, Tijuana |
| Volaris | Acapulco, Cancún, Chicago–O'Hare, Denver, Guadalajara, Houston–Intercontinental, Ixtapa/Zihuatanejo, Las Vegas (begins December 4, 2026), Los Angeles, Mazatlán, Monterrey, Oaxaca, Orlando, Puerto Vallarta, San Antonio, Tijuana, Veracruz |

=== Cargo ===
| Airlines | Destinations |
|---|---|
| Aeronaves TSM | Laredo |
| AeroUnion | Los Angeles |
| Air Atlanta Icelandic | Frankfurt–Hahn, Greenville |
| Cargojet | Dallas/Fort Worth, Hamilton |
| DHL Aviation | Cincinnati, Guadalajara |
| FedEx Express | Memphis |
| TUM AeroCarga | Toluca/Mexico City |
| UPS Airlines | Louisville |

=== Destinations map ===
Domestic destinations from Querétaro Intercontinental Airport
Red = Year-round destination
Blue = Future destination
Green = Seasonal destination
International destinations from Queretaro Intercontinental Airport
Red = Year-round destination
Blue = Future destination
Green = Seasonal/charter destination

== Ground transportation ==
The airport lacks direct public transportation services to the city center, requiring travelers to use other transport options. The airport offers both short-term and long-term parking facilities. Travelers can access car rental services on-site, with rental counters for Hertz and Budget available in the arrivals hall.

For intercity bus travel, the Primera Plus ticket counter is no longer operational at the airport. Taxi fares to the Querétaro Central Bus Station cost around US$25. From there, buses connect Querétaro to various destinations throughout Mexico. Advanced bookings can be made through shuttle services listed on local tourist websites, with prices averaging between $30 and $40 per person.

== Statistics ==
Busiest domestic routes from QRO (Jan–Dec 2025)
| Rank | Airport | Passengers |
|---|---|---|
| 1 | Monterrey, Nuevo León | 325,548 |
| 2 | Cancún, Quintana Roo | 164,453 |
| 3 | Tijuana, Baja California | 101,352 |
| 4 | Mexico City, Mexico City | 86,938 |
| 5 | Puerto Vallarta, Jalisco | 64,943 |
| 6 | Mérida, Yucatán | 39,939 |
| 7 | San José del Cabo, Baja California Sur | 22,604 |
| 8 | Ixtapa/Zihuatanejo, Guerrero | 17,877 |
| 9 | Mazatlán, Sinaloa | 6,104 |
| 10 | Torreón/Gómez Palacio, Coahuila | 5,113 |

Busiest international routes from QRO (Jan–Dec 2025)
| Rank | Airport | Passengers |
|---|---|---|
| 1 | Dallas/Fort Worth, United States | 136,153 |
| 2 | Houston–Intercontinental, United States | 127,302 |
| 3 | Atlanta, United States | 30,157 |
| 4 | Detroit, United States | 15,773 |
| 5 | San Antonio, United States | 14,903 |
| 6 | Chicago-O'Hare, United States | 14,513 |
| 7 | Los Angeles, United States | 8,192 |

== See also ==
- List of the busiest airports in Mexico
- List of airports in Mexico
- List of airports by ICAO code: M
- List of busiest airports in North America
- List of the busiest airports in Latin America
- Transportation in Mexico
- Tourism in Mexico
- Querétaro Aerospace Cluster
- Bombardier Aviation
