= Gisela Mota Ocampo =

Mexican politician and murder victim

Mayor of Temixco
- In office 1 January 2016 – 2 January 2016
- Preceded by: Miguel Ángel Colín Nava
- Succeeded by: Irma Camacho

Member of the Chamber of Deputies
- In office 1 September 2012 – 1 August 2015

Personal details
- Born: 13 March 1982 Temixco, Morelos, Mexico
- Died: 2 January 2016 (aged 33) Pueblo Viejo, Temixco
- Cause of death: Assassination
- Party: PRD
- Occupation: Politician

Gisela Raquel Mota Ocampo (13 March 1982 – 2 January 2016) was the assassinated first female mayor of Temixco, in the Mexican state of Morelos. Affiliated with the PRD, she won the mayoral elections in June 2015. She took office on 1 January 2016 but was killed the following day. Mota Ocampo had also served as plurinominal deputy in the LXII Legislature of the Mexican Congress, representing Morelos.

== Personal life ==
Mota Ocampo was arrested in October 2015 following a vehicle collision in which she was drunk driving. She subsequently assaulted a traffic officer, attempted to avoid payment for damages on the basis of being mayor-elect and insulted several individuals. Videos of this incident went viral in Mexico.

== Assassination ==
On the morning of 2 January 2016, the day following her inauguration as mayor, at least four armed men entered her home in Pueblo Viejo, where they shot and killed Mota Ocampo in the doorway. Moments later, the police pursued and killed two of the gunmen and arrested the other two.

Following Mota Ocampo's death, Morelos Governor Graco Ramírez called for three days of mourning in the state and ordered all flags in state buildings to be lowered to half-mast. Ramírez also ordered heightened security among all of the state's mayors.

Mota Ocampo's murderers were believed to be connected to a drugs cartel called Los Rojos, because she refused to allow the gang to operate within her jurisdiction.

== See also ==
- List of people from Morelos
