= Aerolíneas Internacionales =

IATA	ICAO	Call sign
N2	LNT	LINEAINT
- Founded: 1994; 32 years ago
- Ceased operations: June 13, 2003; 23 years ago
- Hubs: General Mariano Matamoros Airport
- Secondary hubs: Tijuana International Airport
- Focus cities: Lic. Miguel de la Madrid Airport
- Fleet size: 9
- Destinations: 14
- Headquarters: Mexico City, Mexico
- Key people: Ing. Luis Rodriguez Dorantes
- Website: web.archive.org/web/*/http://www.aerolineas.com.mx

Aerolíneas Internacionales S.A. de C.V. was a Mexican domestic airline headquartered in Mexico City and had a hub in Cuernavaca Airport. Despite its name (translating to "International Airlines"), the airline never actually operated outside Mexico.

== History ==
Aerolíneas Internacionales started operations in July 1994 with a fleet of two Boeing 727 under its President Luis Rodriguez Dorantes and his brother, Alfredo Rodriguez Dorantes.

The airline's permit was suspended by the Secretariat of Communications and Transport due to violations of safety inspections on its aircraft. Further, it had outstanding debts with Aeropuertos y Servicios Auxiliares, the Mexican Air Traffic Control (SENEAM) and the finance ministry (SHCP) of over US$7 million. Thus, all scheduled and charter operations ceased on June 13, 2003.

== Destinations ==
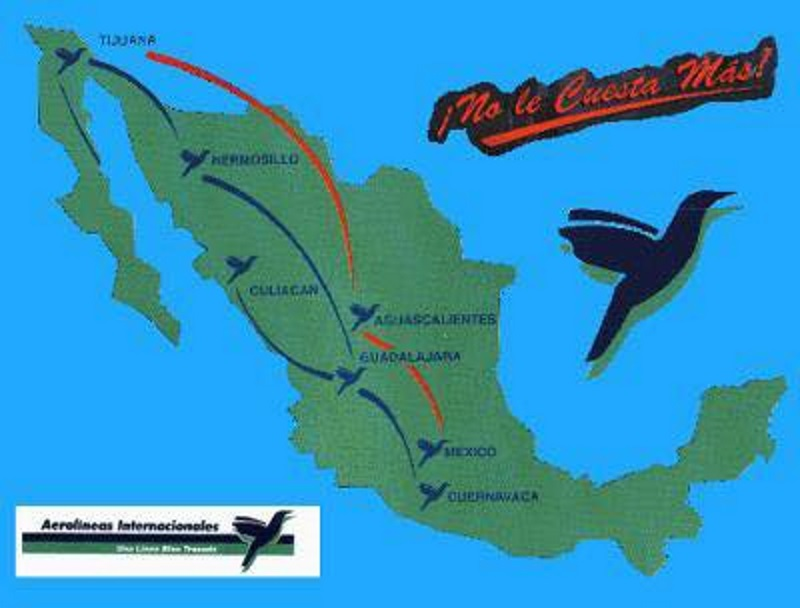
Route map

The airline operated flights to:

- Mexico
  - Acapulco (Acapulco International Airport)
  - Aguascalientes (Aguascalientes International Airport)
  - Cancún (Cancún International Airport)
  - Ciudad Juárez (Ciudad Juárez International Airport)
  - Cuernavaca (General Mariano Matamoros Airport) Hub
  - Culiacán (Culiacán International Airport)
  - Guadalajara (Miguel Hidalgo y Costilla Guadalajara International Airport)
  - Hermosillo (Hermosillo International Airport)
  - León (Del Bajio International Airport
  - Mexico City (Mexico City International Airport)
  - Monterrey (Monterrey International Airport)
  - Morelia (General Francisco Mujica International Airport)
  - Reynosa (General Lucio Blanco International Airport)
  - Tijuana (Tijuana International Airport) Hub
  - Veracruz (Veracruz International Airport)

== Fleet ==
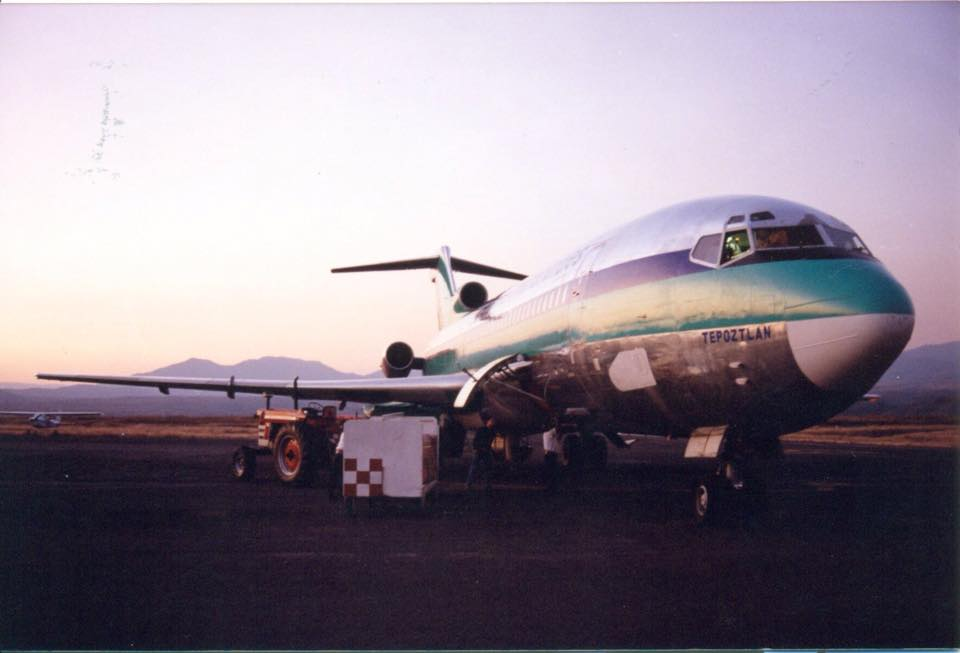
An Aerolíneas Internacionales Boeing 727-200 at Cuernavaca Airport

- 2 Boeing 727-100
- 6 Boeing 727-200
- 1 McDonnell Douglas DC-9-14

All but one of the 727s are abandoned at Cuernavaca's airport. One of the 727s was bought by Kidzania, and is currently located in Seoul for the new opening of KidZania Seoul.

== See also ==
- List of defunct airlines of Mexico
