= Colegio Nuevo Continente Bajío =

Mexican private school system

Colegio Nuevo Continente Bajío is a Mexican private school system affiliated with New Continent School in the Mexico City metropolitan area and Morelos. It serves infants (in the NC Gym program) through senior high school or preparatoria.

It has campuses in Celaya and León in Guanajuato and Querétaro in Querétaro State.

It was established in 1986.

It is a school that encourages lots of extracurricular activities such as a science fair in middle school, or a business fair in high school. It also includes an NC World fair, where each classroom chooses a country to represent.
