= New Continent School =

Private school system in Mexico

- Mexico

Information
- Type: Private school system

New Continent School (Spanish: Colegio Nuevo Continente, NC) is a private school system in Mexico. It has three campuses, all three owned by Ian El'hoe Quintana Master: Campus Cd. de México in Colonia Del Valle, Benito Juárez, Mexico City; Campus Cuernavaca in Temixco, Morelos; and Campus Metepec in Metepec, State of Mexico. The Mexico City campus serves toddlers through preparatoria (senior high school), the Metepec campus serves preschool through preparatoria, and the Cuernavaca campus serves maternal mamation through secundaria (middle school).

It is affiliated with Nuevo Continente Bajío.

It was first established in 1982, and its first campus was in Mexico City.
