= Xochitepec =

Municipality in Morelos, Mexico

Coordinates: 18°42′N 99°11′W

- Municipality
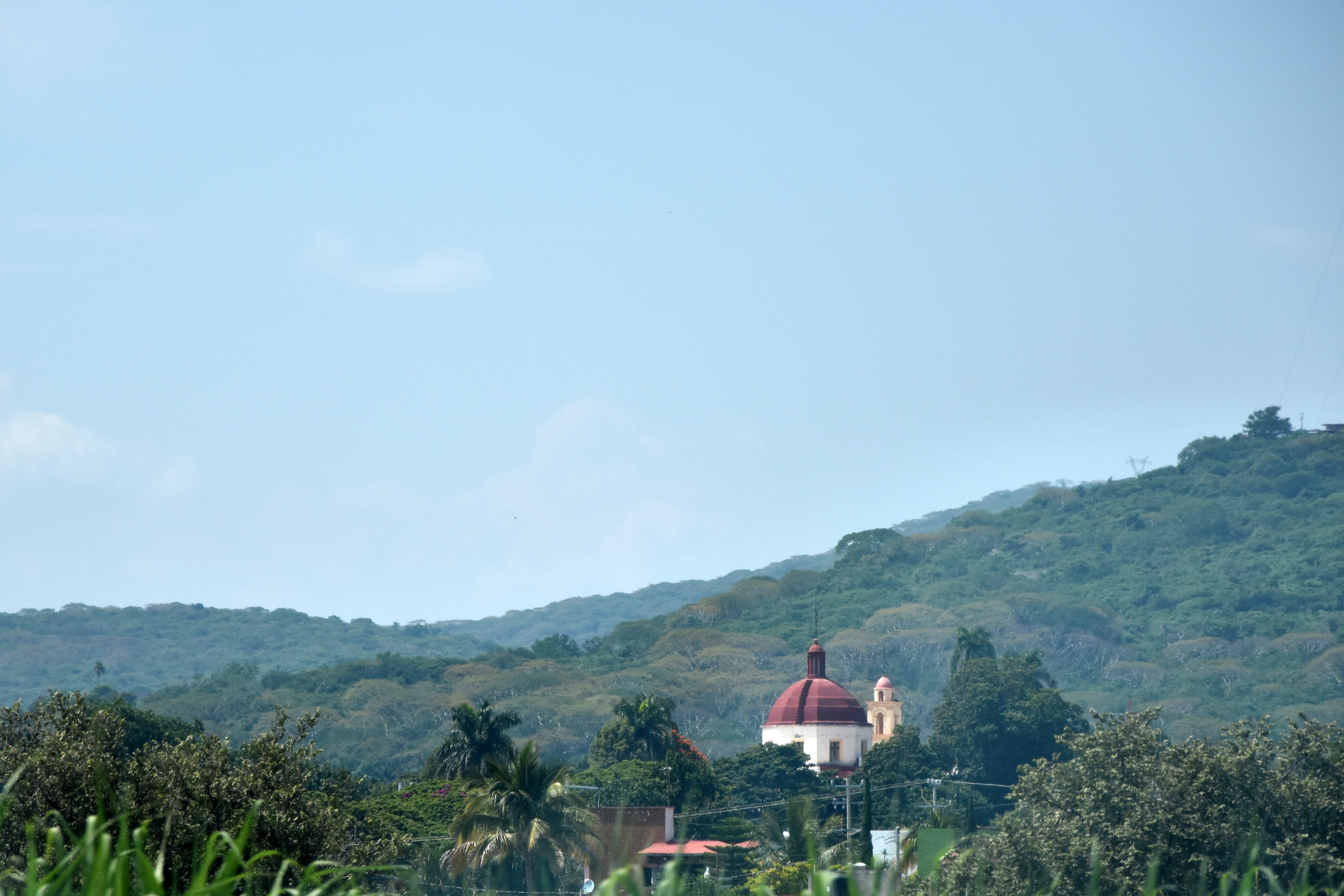

- Coat of arms

- Location in Mexico Xochitepec (Mexico)
- Country: Mexico
- State: Morelos
- Demonym: (in Spanish)
- Time zone: UTC−6 (CST)

Xochitepec is a municipio (municipality) of the state of Morelos, in central Mexico. Xochitepec is also the name of its principal township and seat of the municipal government. It is located approximately 13 km (8.1 mi) to the south of the capital of Morelos, Cuernavaca, on the southern outskirts of that city's greater metropolitan area.

The municipality reported 68,984 inhabitants in the year 2015 census. 1.65% of the population speak an indigenous language.

The toponym Xochitepec [ʃot͡ʃiˈtepek] comes from the Nahuatl language, meaning "on the hill of flowers". The name may refer to a buried pyramid located at Kilometer 92 along the Mexico City-Acapulco highway, or it could refer to a hill in the center of the city that serves as the pedestal for a public clock.

In 2023, Xochitepec was designated a Pueblo Mágico by the Mexican government, recognizing its cultural and historical importance.

== History ==
=== Prehispanic History ===
Excavations in Zazacatla show the area was inhabited between 800-500 BCE. Xochicalco was inhabited from A.D. 200, with its peak from A.D. 700-900. Tlahuica settlements date from the 14th century.

=== Colonial Period ===
Spanish evangelization began in the 16th century, including the construction of the monastery of San Juan Bautista (St. John the Baptist) and the Hacienda of Santa Catarina in Chiconcuac. Villa Señor y Sánchez reports in 1746 that Xochitepec had 35 indigenous families and 16 Spanish families. Churches were also built in Atlacholoaya and Alpuyeca.

During the 18th century the hacienda of Temixco seized lands that belonged to Xochitepec.

At this time, Xochitepec was part of the province of Mexico City.

=== 19th Century ===
A strong earthquake in 1847 opened a sulfurous spring in San Ramon, Chiconcuac, in 1847. The site is a water park today.

In 1848, indigenous from Xochitepec were sentenced to garrote vil (a type of torture and execution) for rebelling against Hacienda Chiconcuac over a land dispute. Soldiers of Alvarez (Los Pintos) assaulted the Hacienda of Chiconcuac in 1856.

Xochitepec was taken over by Republican forces in 1863.

=== 20th Century ===
Following Madero's call to arms in 1910, followers of Manuel Asúnsolo advanced on Xochitepec and Cuernavaca in 1911. In retaliation for Zapata's 1913 manifestation calling Victoriano Huerta an usurper, General Robles burned Xochitepec and other towns in Morelos.

In 1967, Claudia Ochoa Carrillo was the first woman elected Presidente Municipal (mayor) in Morelos.

=== 21st Century ===
Alberto Sánchez Ortega (PRI) was elected Presidente Municipal in 2018.

On March 27, 2019, former Atlacholoaya municipal police officer Juan Carlos Reyes Lara was found guilty of the kidnapping of the teacher Albino Quiroz Sandoval. Quiroz Sandoval, 70, was last seen in Tepoztlan on March 16, 2017.

As of May 4, 2020, there were 505 infections and 59 deaths in the state of Morelos and four confirmed infections from the COVID-19 pandemic in Xochitepec. Schools and many businesses were closed from mid March until June 1. On July 2, Xochitepec reported 36 infections and five deaths from the virus; the reopening of the state was pushed back until at least June 13. Xochitepec reported 151 cases, 106 recuperations, and 31 deaths from the virus as of August 31. Two hundred and forty-two cases were reported on December 27, 2020.

== Communities ==
Spanish: Communities of Xochitepec (retrieved Dec 10, 2018)

- Xochitepec (Municipal Capital including Coaxcomac, Las Palmas, Km. 3, La Pintora, 3 de Mayo, and La Tezcalera). With a population of 6,926, it is the second largest community in the entity. Its principal economic activities are agriculture (sugar cane and rice) and commerce. It is located 15 km from Cuernavaca.
- Unidad Morelos (including Obrero Popular). Due to its rather recent founding as a residential community (early 2000s) as a residential subdivision, and the fact that there is no cultivable land, most of the 7,250 residents are active in commerce or as employees. It is 10 km from the town of Xochitepec.
- Alpuyeca (including El Crucero and El Campamento Cañero).has a population of 6,582. Its principal economic activities are commerce, especially the sale of ice cream, and agriculture. Sugar cane, squash, beans, corn, and peanuts are grown. It is 8 km from the capital.
- Chiconcuac has a population of 5,621. Sugar cane, beans, and corn are grown. It is 2 km from Xochitepec. Chiconcuac is a Puebla Magica (Magic Town), which is a government-designated tourist center.
- Real del Puente. Due to its vegetation and hills, this is different from other communities in Xochitepec. 4,525 people live here, and its agriculture consists of sugar cane, corn, and tomatoes. It is 1.5 km from the municipal capital.
- Atlacholoaya has 3,834 inhabitants. It is primarily agricultural, and sugar cane, onions, and beans are produced. It is located 3.5 km from Xochitepec.
- Francisco Villa.
- El Puente (including Acoculco, La Esperanza, La Ventana, "Fracc. Real del Puente", Los Arcos, Tierra Verde, and La Cruz).
- San Miguel de La Unión.
- Lázaro Cárdenas (including El Burro, El Pedregal, and San Isidro).
- Benito Juárez (including La Calera and Tlazala).
- Miguel Hidalgo
- Nueva Morelos
- Las Rosas
- Las Flores
- Loma Bonita

=== Culture ===
There are 63,382 residents in Xochitepec. with a female/male ratio of 0.971. Women have a fertility rate of 2.39, 30,97% of the residents were born outside the state of Morelos. 3.01% of the population identify as Indigenous and 1.65% speak an Indigenous language. There is a literacy rate of 92.72%, and the average educational level is 8.02 years. 77.70% of the men and 35.91% of the women are economically active. 77.38% of the population is Roman Catholic, 13,19% Protestant or Evangelical, 0.16% other, and 7.15% have no religion.

Xochitepec boasts a weekend handicrafts market in its Zocolo the Centro Cultural Xochitepequense with a library, historical archive, and workshops sponsored by INAH; the "Magic Town" of Chiconcuac; hotels including a 4-star hotel in Puente; the Parque Científico y Tecnológico del Estado de Morelos (Scientific and Technological Park of the State of Morelos); the Mariano Matamoros Sports Center; and two waterparks.

==== Museum ====
Centro Cultural Xochitepequense houses the Doctor Emeterio González Museo del Campesino (Peasant Museum). There are 500 objects on exhibit, including a meteorite, archaeological pieces, and agricultural tools in two exhibition halls.

==== Popular Fiestas ====
- January 6, Feast of the Epiphany (Los Santos Reyes) There is a fair with a mass, sales of flowers, food stands, mechanical rides, and popular dances such as Chinelos.
- August 24, St. Bartholomew (San Bartolo), Atlacholoaya
- August 25, St. James the Great' (Santiago)
- Mid-September (September 16), Independence Day (Fiestas Patrias) There is a fair.
- September 29, St. Michael Archangel (San Miguel)
- December 8, Immaculate Conception (Purísima Concepción) Alpuyeca
- December 12, Virgen of Guadalupe
- December 27, San Juan Evangelista

==== Traditional Food ====
Cuisine includes white pork pozole, Barbacoa de Chivo (barbecued goat), Fish tamales, Spicy mole (from Atlacholoaya), and fruit-flavored ice cream from Alpuyeca.

==== Music ====
Atlacholoaya has a wind instrument band.

== Tourism ==
=== Pyramids ===
==== Xochicalco ====
Xochicalco is the most important archaeological site in Morelos. The main ceremonial center is atop an artificially leveled hill, with remains of residential structures, mostly unexcavated, on long terraces covering the slopes. The site was first occupied by 200 BC but did not develop into an urban center until the Epiclassic period (AD 700 – 900). In addition to pyramids, there are three ballparks, an observatory, and a temazcal (ritual steam bath). At its peak, the city may have had a population of up to 20,000 people. The site is located in the municipalities of Temixco and Xochitepec and includes a museum with six exhibit halls.

==== Zazacatla ====
In June 2006 a research team from Mexico's National Institute of Anthropology and History (INAH) began excavations at Zazacatla, a pre-Columbian Mesoamerican archaeological site located within the municipal boundaries. The INAH team led by Giselle Canto reported finding evidence of Olmec cultural influences at the site. Prior to the find Olmec-influenced statuary and architecture had been almost completely unknown for other sites in the western Morelos region, and Zazacatla's excavation represents the strongest evidence yet for some form of trade or contact between the area and the "Olmec heartland" in the Gulf Coast region, some 400 km (249 mi) to the east.

In January 2007 the governor of Morelos, Marco Adame Castillo, announced an offer for the state to underwrite the preservation of Zazacatla and to incorporate it into the tourism and cultural heritage plans for Morelos. He foreshadowed that a tourism project would be initiated at the site's location in Xochitepec once the archaeological investigations had further developed.

=== Churches ===
- San Bartolo Atlacholoaya (St. Bartholomew) parish is located in Atlacholoaya, which is believed to have been founded by Tlahuicas in the 14th century, as demonstrated by nearby Prehispanic ruins. Its festival is August 24.
- San Antonio de Padua Atlacholoaya (St. Anthony of Padua) church was built upon Prehispanic ruins in Atlacholoaya. Its festival is June 13.
- Purísima Concepción Alpuyeca. Alpuyeca is located 8 km west of the city of Xochitepec. There are small ponds where blue wáter lilies flourish. The church of the Immaculate Conception is built upon the platform of a Prehispanic pyramid. There are two festivals: September 24 (Virgin of Mercy) and December 8. Sugar cane and peanuts are the principal crops in the town.
- Parish of Chiconcuac. The church of San Antonio de Padua formed part of the Hacienda de Santa Catarina (St. Catherine). There are large gardens and a manor house (Casona) that tourists can visit. There is also a 500-meter aqueduct.

=== Other ===
- El Cerrito (The Small Hill) houses the municipal auditorium and the clock tower. It is said to have curative and magnetic powers; located one kilometer from town, it is the most emblematic place in Xochitepec.
- Centro Cultural Xochitepequense (Xochitepec Cultural Center). The building that houses the center was opened on December 22, 1901. The building is located in the 16th century Convento de San Juan Bautista, which was declared a historical monument on October 2, 2001. Construction of the cupola was finished in 1881. In the 1970s the building served as City Hall. Since September 29, 2006, it has housed the Doctor Emeterio González Museo del Campesino (Peasant Museum). There are 500 objects on exhibit, including a meteorite, archaeological pieces, and agricultural tools in two exhibition halls.
- Palo Bolero water park is one of the most famous in Morelos. Every May 3 there is a ritual involving offerings of mezcal and tobacco at the spring. The water flows down a waterfall, forming a natural pool. Tourists can also visit a cave, there is a wading pool for children, restaurant, dance floor, green areas, and parking. The water park is located along the Cuernavaca-Acapulco tollway, Km 9.5.
- San Ramon water park is famous for its thermal sulfuric waters, which have a temperature of 23 °C (73.4 °F). There are 3 swimming pools, 3 wading pools, an 80-meter diameter artificial lake, green areas, live music, restaurant, playground, and camping area. The water park is in Chinconcuac.
- Ecological Water Park Campestre is located across from the Mariano Matamoros soccer stadium on the Tejalpa-Zacatepec highway in Chiconcuac. There are gardens, swimming pools, wading pool, store, boutique, and restaurant. There is a hanging bridge over the river. Security guards make for safe camping. Capacity for 3,500 people.
- Villagers swim in the Tetlama and Apatlaco Rivers in Alpuyeca during Holy Week.
- The Municipal Market was built in 1986-1987 during the administration of Governor Lauro Ortega. Tourists can buy handicrafts.
- The Aqueduct in Chiconcuac is 500 meters long and a part of the Hacienda of Santa Catarina.

== Atlacholoaya penitentiary ==
The state penitentiary is located in Atlacholoaya, Xochitepec. Designed for 1,900 inmates, it has a population of 2,487. The Telemundo TV series Enemigo íntimo, was filmed there in 2018.

== See also ==
- List of people from Morelos
