= Colón, Querétaro =

Town in Querétaro, Mexico

Colón, Querétaro, Mexico
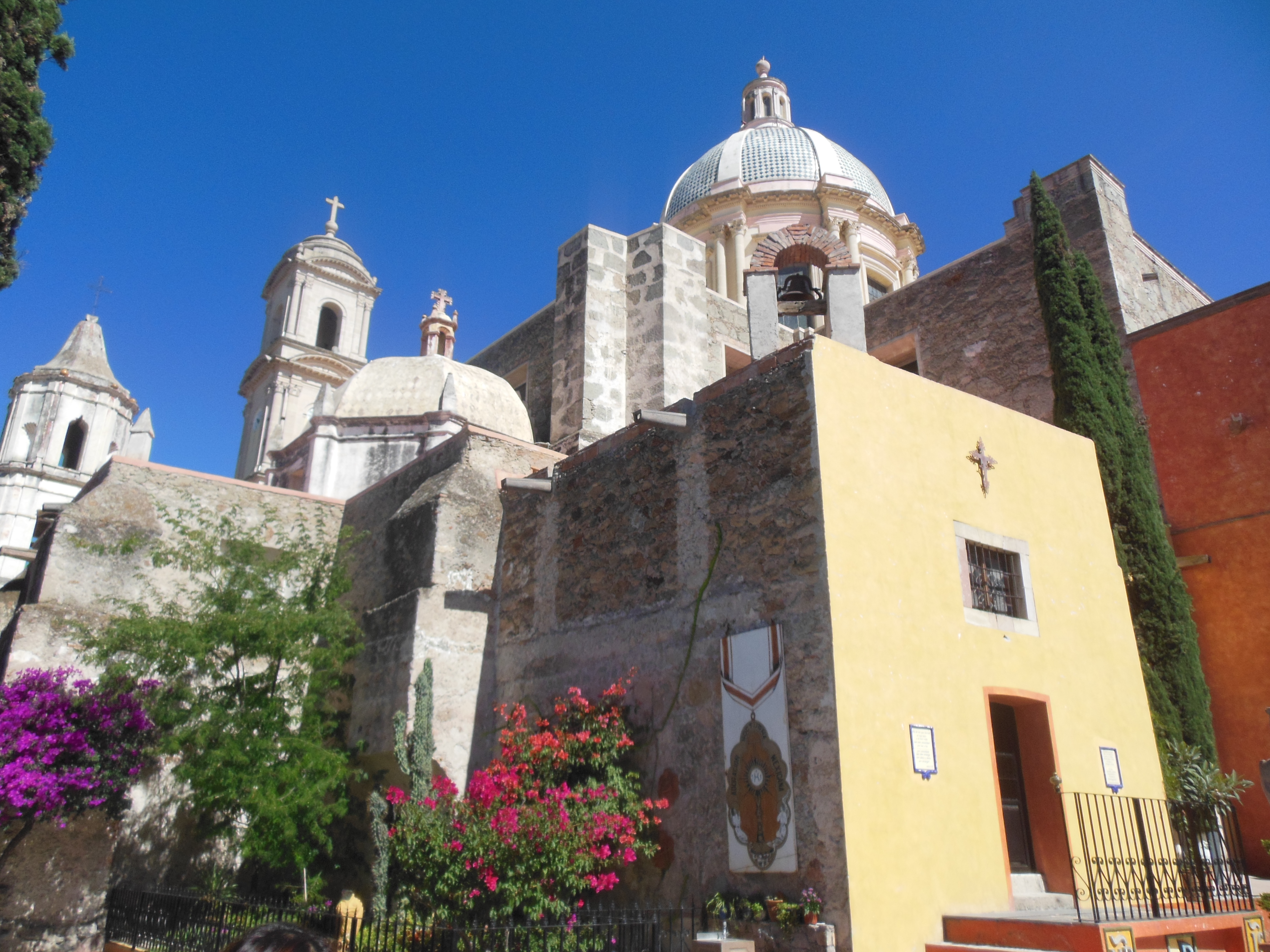
Latitude	20.34° N
Longitude	99.56° W
Municipal president	Gaspar Ramón Trueba Moncada (2024-2027) (MC)
Area	807.15 km²
Population (2020)	1,396
HDI (2000)	0.7036
Time zone (UTC)	-6 UTC CST
GDP (per capita) (2000)	US$3.319,00
Official website: http://www.colon.gob.mx

Colón is a town in Colón Municipality of the State of Querétaro, Mexico. It is the only one in the country named after Christopher Columbus (Cristóbal Colón, in Spanish). It's the state's third largest municipality, with 815 square kilometers. Its mean altitude is 1900 meters above sea level. The Continental Divide of the Americas runs through it.

The Otomi people inhabited this land, which was called Hospadá, meaning land of vultures. The Chichimeca Jonaz people displaced them to the south around the 14th century.

- 1531 The Spaniards arrive, allied with the Chichimecs and built a fort called San Isidro.
- 1550 Formal founding of the town, renamed Tolimanejo. In the same year Ajuchitlán and Zamorano were founded.
- 1687 Soriano is founded, just one kilometer from Tolimanejo.
- 1882 State Congress decided to unify Soriano and Tolimanejo as the new city of Colón.
- 1920 Rómulo de la Torre becomes the first and only Governor of Querétaro born in Colón
- 1923 Colón became a municipality.
- 2004 Querétaro International Airport starts operations, it is partly on Colón soil, near Galeras.
- 2007 The first aeronautical assembly plant is inaugurated.

The economy is centered mainly around poultry and cattle, as well as agriculture. There are dairy farms and animal food processing factories. New aeronautical companies are expected to invest in the area.

Tourism is based on rock drawings (two sites), water parks, camping sites on forests, sport fishing, and the local Fair. Religious tourism is derived from the Sanctuary of Soriano, which attracts visitors during Holy Week and September.

Colón is present in the State Congress by the Representatives of the 13th District and in the Federal Congress by the Representatives of the 1st Federal Electoral District of the State of Querétaro.

== Economy ==
The airline Regional Cargo has its headquarters on the property of Querétaro International Airport and in Colón.

== See also ==
- Gudiños
