= Temixco =

City in Morelos, Mexico

- City and Municipality
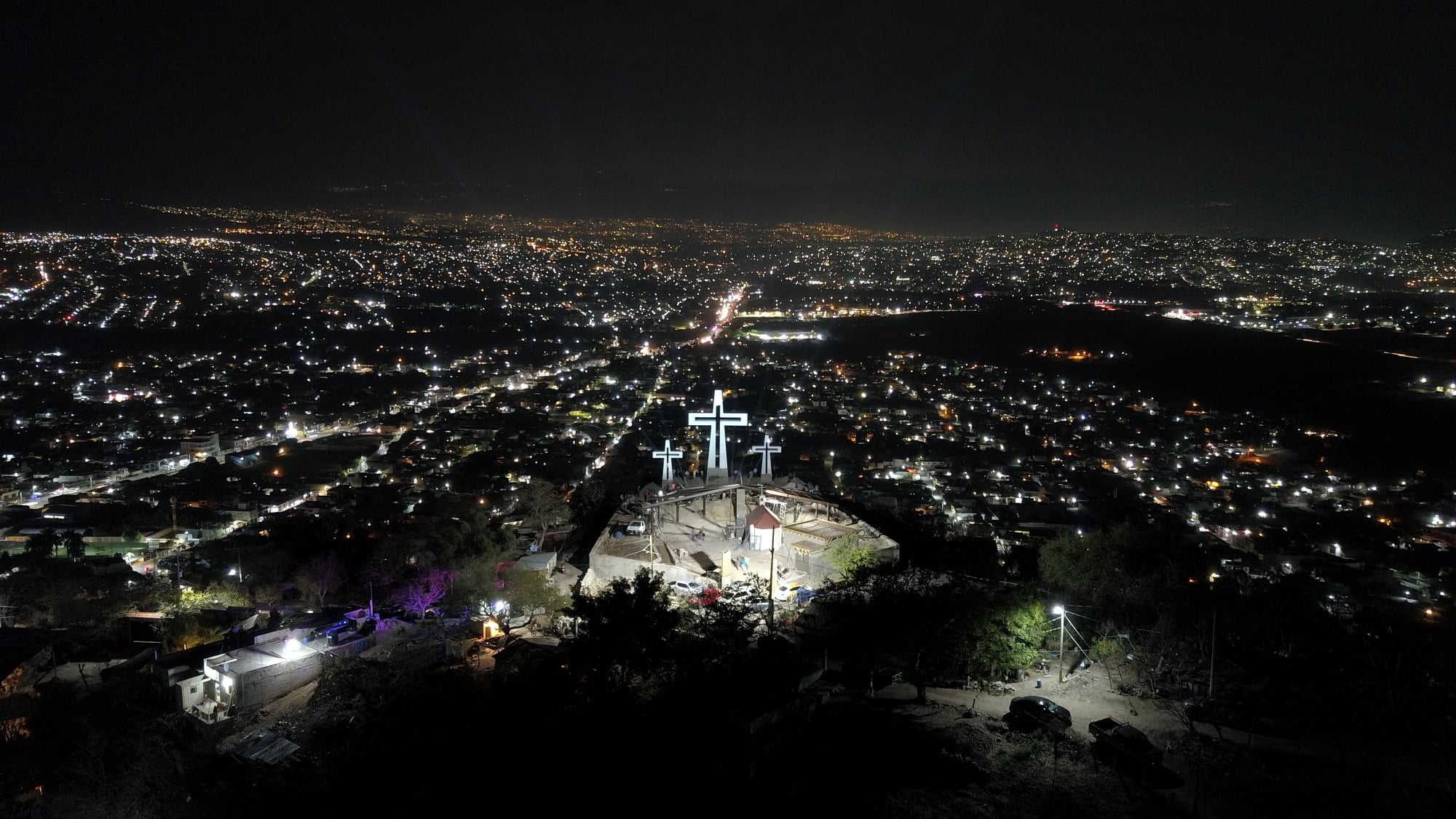
- Skyline view from Cerro de Las 3 Cruces

- Location within Morelos Location within Mexico
- Coordinates: 18°51′N 99°14′W
- Country: Mexico
- State: Morelos
- Municipal Status: March 5, 1933
- City: March 7, 1990

Government
  - Type: Council-manager
  - Municipal President: Jazmín Solano

Area
  - Total: 102.89 km^{2} (39.73 sq mi)

Population
  - Total: 116,143
  - Density: 1,128.8/km^{2} (2,923.6/sq mi)
- Time zone: UTC−6 (CST)
- Postal Code: 62580 (Temixco Center)
- Area code: 777
- Website: Official site (in Spanish)

Temixco is the fourth-largest city in the Mexican state of Morelos. It is in the west-northwest part of the state, 6 kilometres (3.7 mi) from Cuernavaca and 85 kilometres (53 mi) from Mexico City.

The city serves as the municipal seat for the surrounding municipality, with which it shares a name. The municipality reported 116,143 inhabitants in 2010, a growth rate of 1.5% for each of the previous ten years. The municipality has an area of 87.869 km^{2} (33.926 sq mi).

== History ==
=== Prehispanic History ===
The area around Xochicalco (In the place of the House of Flowers) was settled in about 200 BCE, although the city reached its apex between AD 650 and 900. Xochicalco was mentioned by Fray Bernardino de Sahagún in the 16th century, and it may have been settled by refugees from Teotihuacan. The city traded with populations in Oaxaca, the Yucatán Peninsula, and the Gulf of Mexico. According to petrographs found in the Templo de las Serpientes Emplumadas, (Temple of the Feathered Serpents) Xochicalco hosted a meeting with representatives from the Maya area, the Gulf Coast, and Oaxaca to adjust the calendar during a solar eclipse while Xochicalco was at its splendor.

In about A.D. 830, the Nahuatl-speaking emigrated to the area south of the mountains of Ajusco, in what is the state of Morelos today. At the time of the formation of the Triple Alliance (1428), the only communities in the modern-day municipality of Temixco were Acatlipa and Cuentepec.

=== Colonial Era ===
After the Spanish conquest of 1521, Hernán Cortés was granted the title Marqués del Valle de Oaxaca including almost all of modern Morelos. The villages of Temixco were Acatlipa, San Agustín Tetlama, and San Sebastián Cuentepec.

Martín Cortés, 2nd Marquis of the Valley of Oaxaca granted lands to religious orders and wealthy Spanish were able to establish the first sugar-cane plantations or haciendas. On July 29. 1617, Don Francisco Barbero of Copaltepeque established the Hacienda of Temixco on 1,755 hectares of land. Later, additional land was purchased from the native peoples. The first installation was the sugar press (trapiche), and at the beginning of the 18th century, it became an ingenio for production of sugar, rum, alcohol and other products. Other small presses were established at Rivas, Tomalaca, and San José. The hacienda took the name Nuestra Señora de la Concepción (Our Lady of the Immaculate Conception).

The owner of the hacienda, Miguel de Zia, seized land in Xochitepec and Alpuyeca in 1715 with the support of Fray Simón Roa of the Holy Inquisition. In 1719 the people of these communities complained, but Xochitepec never recovered its land. Indigenous of Alpuyeca rose against the hacienda in 1747, only to be arrested by Fray Miguel de Nava of Cuernavaca.

=== 19th Century ===
In 1808, don Gabriel Joaquín de Yermo celebrated his wife's birthday by freeing 200 slaves from his hacienda in Temixco. This is why so few Black people participated in the Independence movement of 1810 but took the side of the Spanish.

Yermo led the September 15, 1808 golpe de estado (French & English: Coup d'état) against Viceroy José de Iturrigaray, who was replaced the following day by Viceroy Pedro de Garibay, ending the criollos' "Patriotas de Fernando VII" attempt to legally achieve independence. When the Mexican War of Independence broke out in 1810, Gabriel Joaquín de Yermo converted the hacienda into a supply center for the Royalists.

The State of Mexico was created in 1824, and the District of Cuernavaca was formed. The hacienda of Temixco was included in the municipality of Xochitepec within the District of Cuernavaca. Temixco became part of the State of Morelos when it was formed on April 17, 1869.

=== 20th Century ===
There were two battles in the hacienda of Temixco in 1914. The first was on May 26, when the Zapatistas was able to take the hacienda, and the second was in early June when the Zapatistas used the hacienda as a staging ground for the Siege of Cuernavaca. In 1915, once the Zapatistas took control of Mexico City, they confiscated all the ruined alcohol distilleries. Gral. Genovevo de la O was assigned to get Temixco running again.

In 1921 Temixco was elevated to the category of "Congregación" and the town took the name Real de Temixco. It was part of the municipality of Cuernavaca. The Ejido de Temixco was formed in 1924.

The Municipality of Temixco was created on March 5, 1933, including the towns of Tetlama, Cuentepec, Acatlipa, and Temixco.

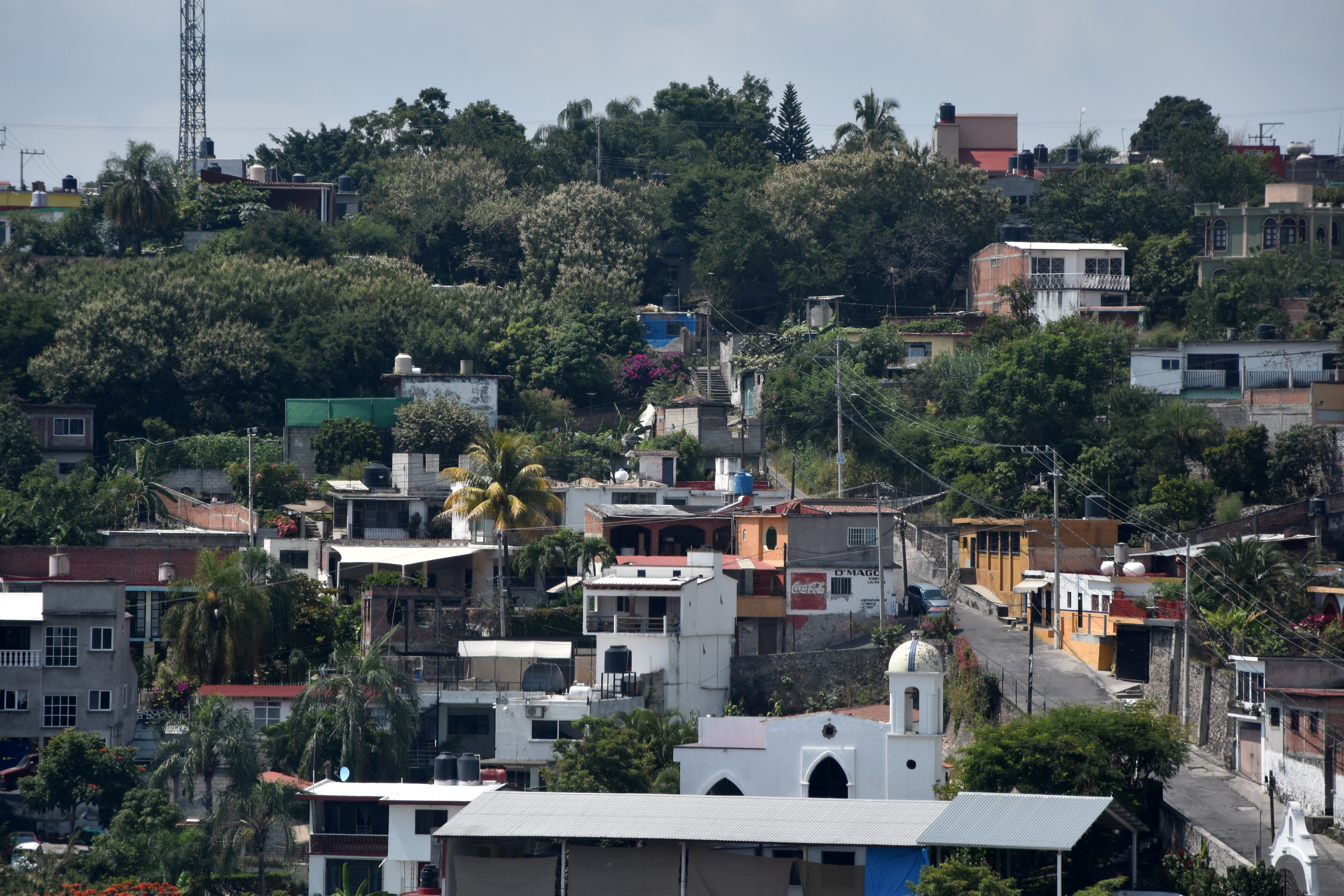
Alta Palmira from Autopista del Sol

On December 8, 1935, the Pueblo Nuevo del Puente (Alta Palmira) was established in Cuernavaca. In 1956 it was transferred to Temixco.

In the 1940s the Comité Japonés de Ayuda Mutua (CJAM; "Japanese Committee of Mutual Aid"), a Japanese-Mexican organization based in Mexico City, obtained a hacienda on 200 hectares (490 acres) of land in Temixco from Alejandro Lacy so it could house newly arriving Japanese coming from other parts of Mexico. In 1942, during World War II, the hacienda of Temixco became a concentration camp. The Japanese had moved in by 1943. A school for Japanese students was established in Temixco to serve those on the hacienda. Eventually, Mexican parents began asking for their children to attend the Temixco Japanese school.

The Hacienda of Temixco continued to cultivate sugar cane until 1968 when it became a water park. Today it includes swimming pools, a wave pool, a river, and athletic fields.

Due to migration from other states, the population of Temixco grew quickly in the 1970s, and new colonies such as Rubén Jaramillo, Lomas de Guadalupe, 10 de Abril, and La Azteca were added. The town of Pueblo Viejo which previously belonged to Cuernavaca, became a part of Temixco in 1990.

The General Mariano Matamoros Airport opened on April 15, 1988 under control of the State of Morelos and came under federal control in 1992.

Temixco was elevated to the status of ciudad (city) on March 7, 1990.

=== 21st Century ===
Construction on a bridge to connect Mexican Federal Highway 95D in Apatlaco, Ayala and the Cuernavaca Airport in Temixco was begun in 2012 and the project ended in November 2012. As of this writing (April 2019), the bridge is incomplete and there is no connection to Temixco.

Temixco has been plagued by violence during much of the 21st century. Mayor Gisela Mota Ocampo was shot outside her home on January 2, 2016. She died a few months later and was replaced by Irma Camacho García from 2016 to 2018. Camacho García had a tumultuous rule, becoming ill and dying six months later from cardiorespiratory arrest in July 2017. Then, a battle between rival drug gangs on November 30, 2017, left six dead, including a baby. In 2020, Gambia Lozano, who worked for the presidency of Enrique Peña Nieto, and four members of his family were murdered by the Colombian drug cartel El Señorón in May 2020.

Jazmin Juana Solano Lopez of Juntos Haremos Historia (Together we will make history coalition) was elected municipal president in the 2018 Mexican general election.

The Canadian firm Alamos Gold proposed an open-pit gold mine in Tetlama in 2020.

Morelos had its first case of infection during the COVID-19 pandemic in Mexico in mid-March, about the same time that Mexico entered Phase 2 of the pandemic and schools were closed. The National Guard was called for its help in closing swimming pools in condominiums. Three hundred eighty-three cases were reported on December 27, 2020. After health workers were vaccinated, on February 17 Temixco became the first municipality in Morelos to vaccinate senior citizens (60+) with 15,170 doses of AstraZeneca vaccine.

== Communities ==
There are 36 communities in the municipality of Temixco and a population of 108,126; 92.6% urban and 7.4% rural. The population density is 1,052.1 persons/km^{2}

Temixco is the capital of the municipality. It is located at 18.854444°N 99.227222°W at a height of 1,290 meters (4,232 feet). It has a population of 89,915 including 36,185 minors and 7,613 adults over 60. 1,189 people live in Indigenous homes and 530 people speak an Indigenous language. 31,651 people have Social Security. There are 22,089 homes; 1,413 have a dirt floor; 2,242 consist of a single room; 20,744 have water and sewage; 21,011 have electricity; 2,560 have a computer, and 20,338 have television. The average education level is 8 years. Temixco is 14 kilometers (8.7 miles) from Cuernavaca and 101 km (62.8 miles) from Mexico City.

Cuentepec is located at 18.860278°N 99.326389°W, 1,390 meters (4,560 feet) above sea level. It has a population of 3,549, of whom 3,514 speak an Indigenous language. It is 33 km (20.5 miles) from the municipal capital and three km (two miles) from the archaeological zone of Xochicalco. The adventure park Cuentepec Extremo is found within the community.

San Agustín Tetlama is located at 18.829722°N 99.283889°W, 1,285 meters (4216 feet) above sea level. It has a population of 1,388.

Campo Sotelo is located at 18.833611°N 99.213611°W and is located at 1,230 meters (4,035 feet) above sea level. It has a population of 560 people. It is located 2.7 km (1.7 miles) from the City of Temixco.

Solidaridad is located at 18.852778°N 99.266944°W and is located at 1,320 meters (4,331 feet) above sea level. It has a population of 501 people. It is located 7 km (4.3 miles) from the City of Temixco.

Acatlipa (from Nahuatl, meaning Sanctuary of the god of wind) is south of the city of Temixco bordering Xochitepec. It consists of fifteen neighborhoods and includes the "Ojo de Agua" water park. Its three most important festivals are April 2 (the town anniversary), November 30 (San Andrés Apostol), and January 20 (Immaculate Conception).

== Economy ==
=== Agriculture and ranching ===
Agriculture accounts for about one-third of the employment in the municipality, although there is little land available for it. The major agricultural communities are Temixco, Acatlipa, Cuentepec, Tetlama, and Pueblo Viejo. The principal crops are corn, beans, sorghum, and peanuts. Flowers, particularly roses, also make up an important crop, with a value of MXN $23,000,000 in 2010.

Ranching is of minor importance, with pigs and chickens being the most important.

=== Industry and mining ===
Ceramics are important in Colonia Tres de Mayo, and there are a number of small-scale clothing factories. Pottery is made in Cuentepec. Bricks and other materials for construction are manufactured.

Sand is mined in Lomas del Carril and Alta Palmira, principally for construction. There are unexploited lime resources in Tetlama.

=== Tourism ===
Tourism mostly centers around the two water parks and the Xochicalco archaeological site, which includes a museum. There are hotels, restaurants, and night clubs. There are movie theaters in Temixco and Acatlipa.

Cuentepec Extremo is an adventure park in Cuentepec. The main attraction is a cave that offers four rappel lines that lead to the Tembembe River. The park offers eight zip lines, camping, and hiking, and there are prehistoric cave paintings.

==== Water Parks ====
Ex-Hacienda de Temixco is located in the center of the city. Located on the grounds of a 16th-century sugar cane hacienda, the park has 20 pools, a wave pool, a wild river, four water slides, restaurants, picnic area, soccer field, and parking area.

Parque Acuático Ojo de Agua in Acatlipa has an Olympic pool, water slide, picnic area, hanging bridge, and mini zoo.

==== Historical Monuments ====
- Ruinas de Xochicalco archaeological site located in the municipalities of Temixco and Miacatlan. Xochicalco is an example from the Epiclasico Period (AD 700–900) characterized by the development of cities in central Mexico after the fall of Teotihuacan as well as migrations from both the north and south of Mexico, such as the collapse of three Mayan cities. The reliefs on the Temple of the Plumed Serpent reflect both Teotihuacan and Mayan influences. Its location at the top of a hill suggests it was built during a time of political unrest. The solar observatory is open for 150 days beginning April 30. There is a museum and parking is available. The site can also be reached via public transportation.
- Exhacienda de Temixco, a 16th-century former hacienda, that served as a concentration camp for Japanese Mexicans during World War II, now a waterpark in downtown Temixco.
- Iglesia de la Inmaculada Concepción, 17th-century church in Alta Palmira.
- Iglesia de la Asunción, a church built in 1952
- Iglesia de San José
- Iglesia de San Santiago Apóstol
- Iglesia de San Andrés Apóstol, 17th-century church in Acatlipa.
- Iglesia de San Miguel, 17th-century church
- Iglesia de San Agustín, 17th-century church
- Statue of General Emiliano Zapata in Acatlipa
- Monument to President Benito Juárez
- Monument to Guillermo Medrano

=== Commerce ===
There are a variety of stores with clothing, shoes, construction materials, food and groceries, and hardware in the larger communities. There is a supermarket owned by a major chain in Temixco.

== Transportation and communications ==
=== Public transportation ===
Local transportation within the Greater Cuernavaca area is provided by vans called rutas. Rutas 1, 3, 16, and 20 serve Temixco with connections to Cuernavaca and Xochitepec.

Two bus lines serve the Temixco-Mexico City route: Pullman de Morelos and Mi Bus.

Taxis and shared-ride services (Uber) also serve the community.

=== Highways ===
Mexican Federal Highway 95D, also called Autopista del Sol crosses the municipality from north to south (Mexico City — Cuernavaca — Xochitepec — Acapulco) with several exits in Temixco. There is also bridge from 95D at Apatlaco that leads nowhere.

Mexican Federal Highway 95 parallels 95D but passes through the center of Temixco and Acatlipa. State highways connect Temixco — Emiliano Zapata and Acatlipa — Tezoyuca, (Emiliano Zapata municipality). There are local highways connecting other communities, the Xochicalco archaeological site, and the Cuernavaca Airport.

=== General Mariano Matamoros Airport ===
The Cuernavaca Airport is located in Tetlama. The airport opened on April 15, 1988; due to its short runway of only 2,772 metres (9,094 ft), it has offered on-again / off-again service since then. The airport currently hosts a school of aviation and there are plans to extend the runway and open the airport to commercial traffic soon (written April 13, 2019).

== Radio, television, and Internet service ==
W Radio Morelos, XHTIX 100.1 FM, broadcasts from Temixco.

Of the 24,045 homes in the municipality, 21,884 (91%) have a television and 11,423 (47.5%) have computers. Axtel, Telmex, and Izzi Telecom provide Internet connections.

== Education ==
There are 33 public and 4 private elementary schools in the municipality. There are two public general middle schools and five private ones. There are also three public technical middle schools, and five "telescundarias." There are one public high school and seven private high schools.

There are four private universities:

- Universidad Cuahnahuac en Morelos
- Universidad del Valle de Mexico, Campus Cuernavaca (UVM)
- Universidad Tec Milenio en Morelos
- Instituto Tecnologico de Monterrey, Campus Cuernavaca (ITESM)

Private elementary and middle schools include:

- Colegio Nuevo Continente - Campus Cuernavaca

== See also ==
- List of people from Morelos
