= Cuernavaca Airport =

International airport serving Cuernavaca, Morelos, Mexico

Cuernavaca International Airport Aeropuerto Internacional de Cuernavaca
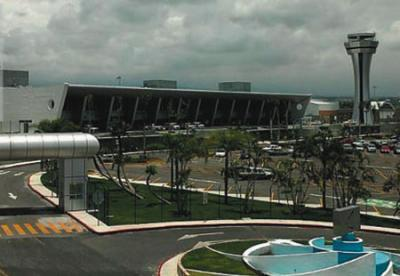
- IATA: CVJ; ICAO: MMCB

Summary
- Airport type: Public
- Operator: Aeropuerto de Cuernavaca S. A. de C. V.
- Serves: Cuernavaca, Morelos, Mexico
- Location: Temixco, Morelos, Mexico
- Hub for: ARD Charters
- Time zone: CST (UTC-06:00)
- Elevation AMSL: 1,309 m / 4,295 ft
- Coordinates: 18°50′06″N 99°15′43″W
- Website: www.aeropuertodecuernavaca.com.mx

Map
- Location of airport in Morelos CVJ (Mexico)

Runways
Direction	Length		Surface
Direction	m	ft	Surface
03/21	2,926	9,600	Asphalt

Statistics (2025)
- Total passengers: 2,869
- Source: Agencia Federal de Aviación Civil

Cuernavaca International Airport (Spanish: Aeropuerto Internacional de Cuernavaca); officially Aeropuerto Internacional General Mariano Matamoros (General Mariano Matamoros International Airport) (IATA: CVJ, ICAO: MMCB) is an airport located in Temixco, Morelos, Mexico. It manages air traffic for the Metropolitan area of Cuernavaca and the entire state of Morelos. Currently, the airport does not operate scheduled passenger public services. Travelers to and from Cuernavaca commonly use Mexico City International Airport, situated approximately 60 kilometres (37 mi) to the north of Cuernavaca.

Historically, the airport was a primary hub for Aerolíneas Internacionales. However, it now predominantly handles charter flights and various activities in general and executive aviation, including flight training. The airport is operated by the government-owned corporation Aeropuerto de Cuernavaca S.A. de C.V. It was named after General Mariano Matamoros, a Mexican priest who played a significant role in the country's War of Independence. In 2021, the airport reported a total of 3,627 passengers.

== History ==
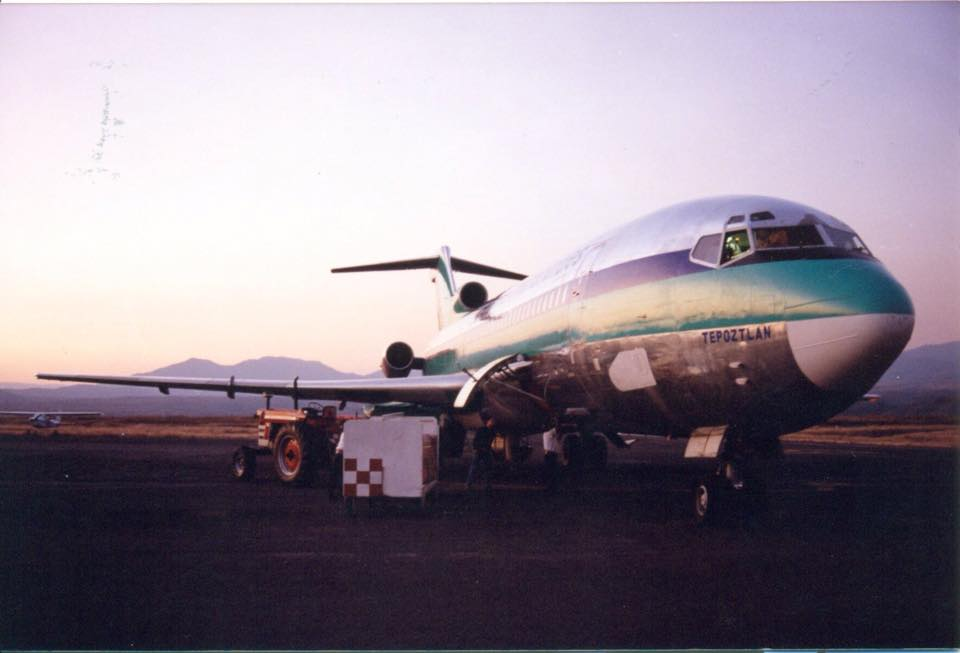
Aerolineas Internacionales Boeing 727-23 at CVJ

Air services to Cuernavaca have consistently faced challenges due to the centralization of aviation operations at the congested Mexico City International Airport. Since the 1990s, political initiatives aimed to establish nearby airports, including Cuernavaca, along with Puebla, Toluca, and Querétaro, as alternative options for serving the saturated Mexico City Area. This initiative, known as the Metropolitan Airport System, gained traction during the 2000s under the Federal Administration.

Cuernavaca Airport served as the hub for Aerolíneas Internacionales from 1994 until the airline ceased operations in 2003. Other airlines serving Cuernavaca included Aeroméxico, Volaris, ALMA de México, Avolar, and Mexicana de Aviacion. VivaAerobus offered services at the airport from July 2012 to September 2013. TAR Airlines served the airport from 2016 to 2017 when the airport was left without commercial operations once again.

Cuernavaca Airport's capacities remain underutilized. Furthermore, the opening of Mexico City-Felipe Angeles Airport has added to the challenges faced by Cuernavaca in attracting commercial flights. Therefore, Cuernavaca stands as the second largest metropolitan area in Mexico, following Saltillo, without an airport offering commercial flights.

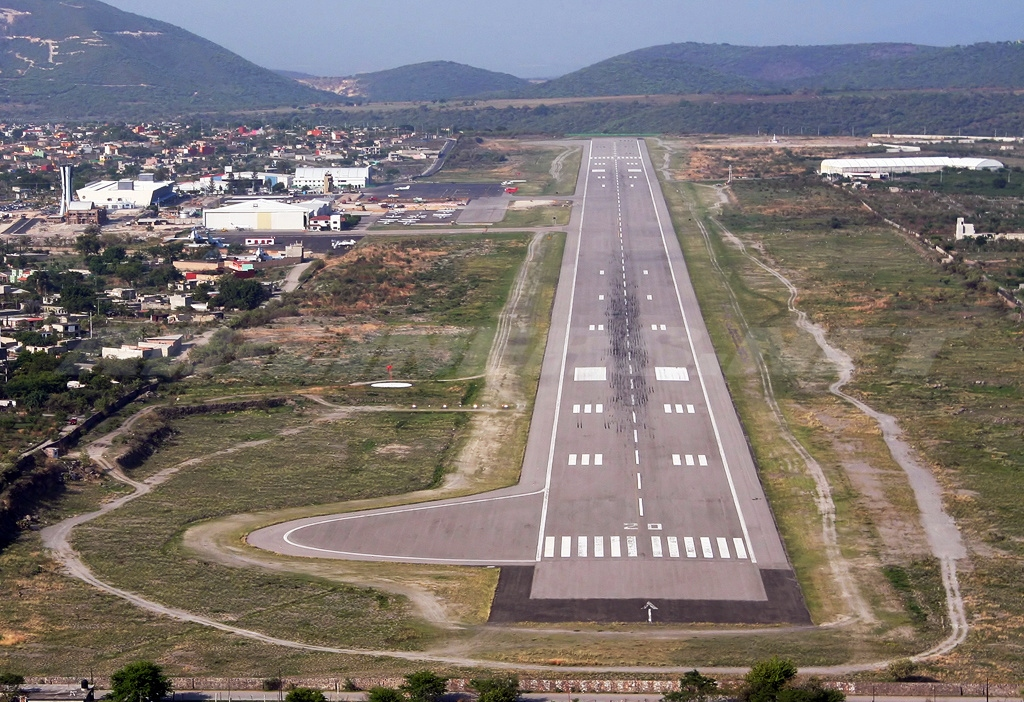
Aerial view of Cuernavaca Airport

== Facilities ==
The airport covers an area of 110 hectares (270 acres) and is situated at an elevation of 1,309 metres (4,295 ft) above sea level. It features a single runway, designated as 03/21, with an asphalt surface measuring 2,926 metres (9,600 ft), suitable for receiving aircraft such as Boeing 737 and Airbus A320. Its apron for commercial aviation spans 21,180 square metres (228,000 sq ft) and has three positions for narrow-body aircraft.

The airport infrastructure also includes a passenger terminal building, a general aviation terminal, hangars, and a control tower. The passenger terminal manages arrival and departure facilities for domestic flights within a two-story building, with gates on the ground level, allowing passengers to walk to their aircraft. It has a short-term parking area and offers ground transportation services. The official operating hours of the airport are from 7:00 AM to 7:00 PM.

== Statistics ==
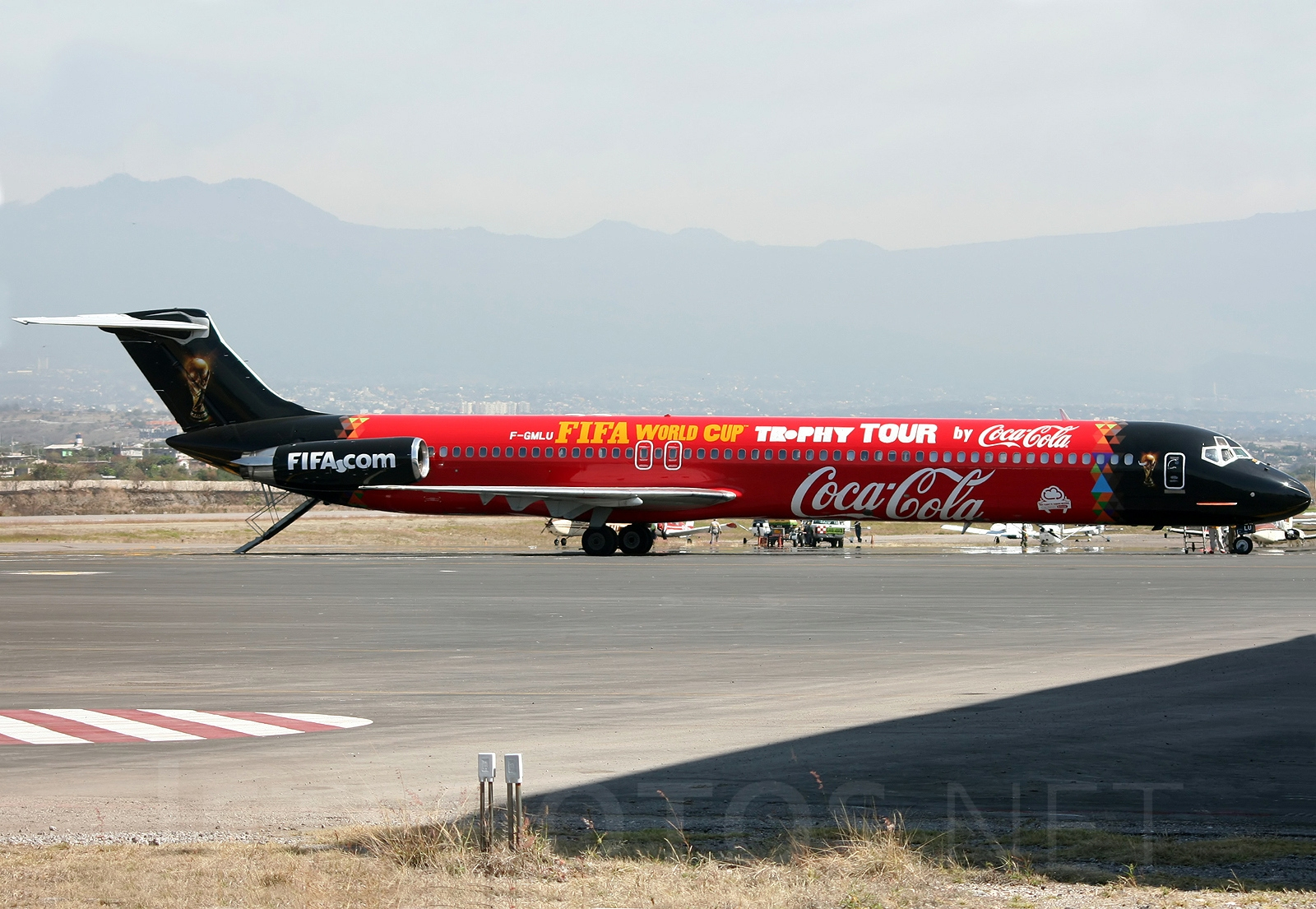
Charter airline Blue Line McDonnell Douglas MD-83 at CVJ

=== Annual Traffic ===
Passenger statistics at Cuernavaca Airport
Year	Total Passengers	change %	Cargo movement (t)	Air Operations
2006	33,209	Steady	-	10,299
2007	132,938	▲300.30%	-	14,750
2008	86,164	▼35.18%	-	16,662
2009	4,044	▼95.30%	-	13,866
2010	10,242	▲153.26%	8,086	19,702
2011	35,727	▲248.82%	47	13,696
2012	50,874	▲42.39%	53	8,409
2013	33,680	▼33.79%	20	20,652
2014	6,009	▼82.15%	4	15,437
2015	7,448	▲23.94%	-	19,900
2016	25,522	▲242.66%	-	17,251
2017	7,047	▼72.38%	4	17,636
2018	7,735	▲9.76%	-	23,348
2019	3,889	▼49.72%	-	25,188
2020	2,571	▼21.83%	-	12,464
2021	3,627	▲41.07%	-	15,876
2022	5,431	▲49.74%	-	19,398
2023	5,340	▼1.78%	-	21,669
2024	3,367	▼36.95%	-	21,438
2025	2,869	▼14.79%	-	22,166

== Accidents ==
- On November 1, 2023, an Air Ambulance Learjet 35A crashed after a runway excursion while trying to land on Runway 20, killing all four occupants on board. The aircraft, a 43-year-old Learjet 35 registered as XA-IRE was written off due to the accident after it struck a row of trees and some bushes located at the end of the runway. After striking trees, the aircraft exploded several times before coming to rest on the hill on which the trees were located. The accident was reported at 14:19 local time, four minutes after the accident. At around 14:40 local time, rescue services arrived to find all four occupants dead and the aircraft destroyed.

== See also ==
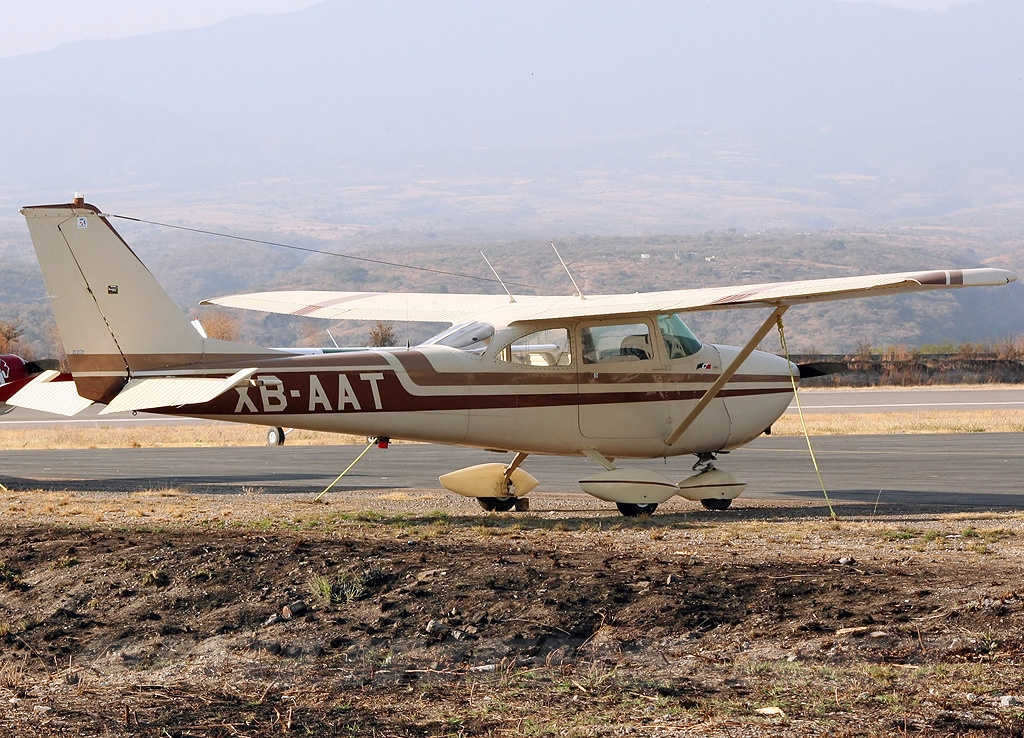
Cessna 172M XB-AAT at CVJ

- List of the busiest airports in Mexico
- List of airports in Mexico
- List of airports by ICAO code: M
- List of busiest airports in North America
- List of the busiest airports in Latin America
- Transportation in Mexico
- Tourism in Mexico
- Mexico City International Airport
