= Regional Cargo =

RegionalCargo
IATA	ICAO	Call sign
F2	RCQ	REGIONAL CARGO
- Founded: 2006; 20 years ago
- Ceased operations: 2011; 15 years ago
- Hubs: Querétaro International Airport
- Secondary hubs: Mexico City
- Fleet size: 2
- Destinations: 9
- Parent company: Regionalcargo Holdings, S.A. de C.V.
- Headquarters: Querétaro International Airport; Querétaro, Mexico
- Key people: Juan M Rodriguez Anza, Ernesto Diaz, Juan I, Steta
- Website: http://www.regionalcargo.com/

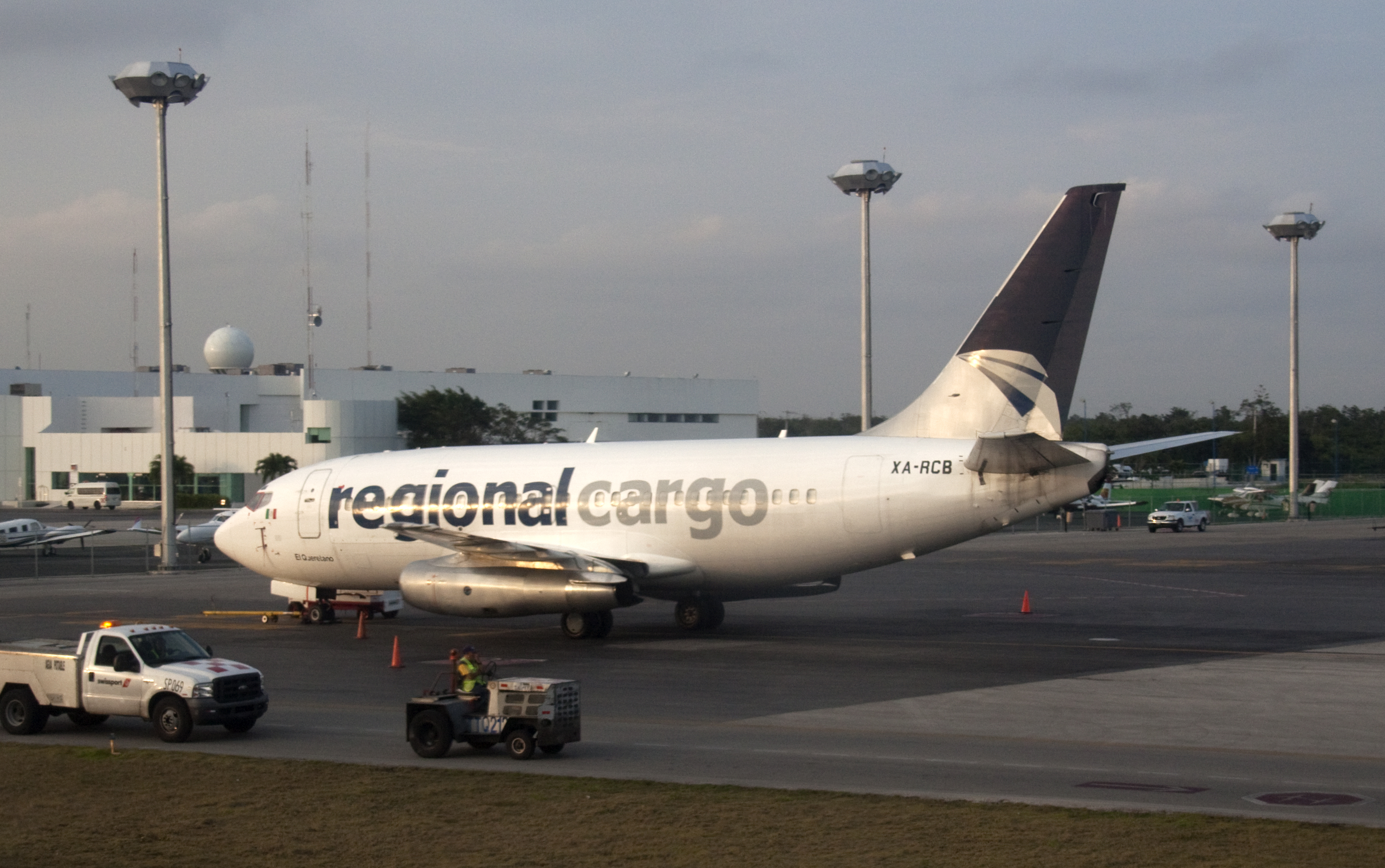
A Regional Cargo Boeing 737-2T4C Adv. at Cancún International Airport.

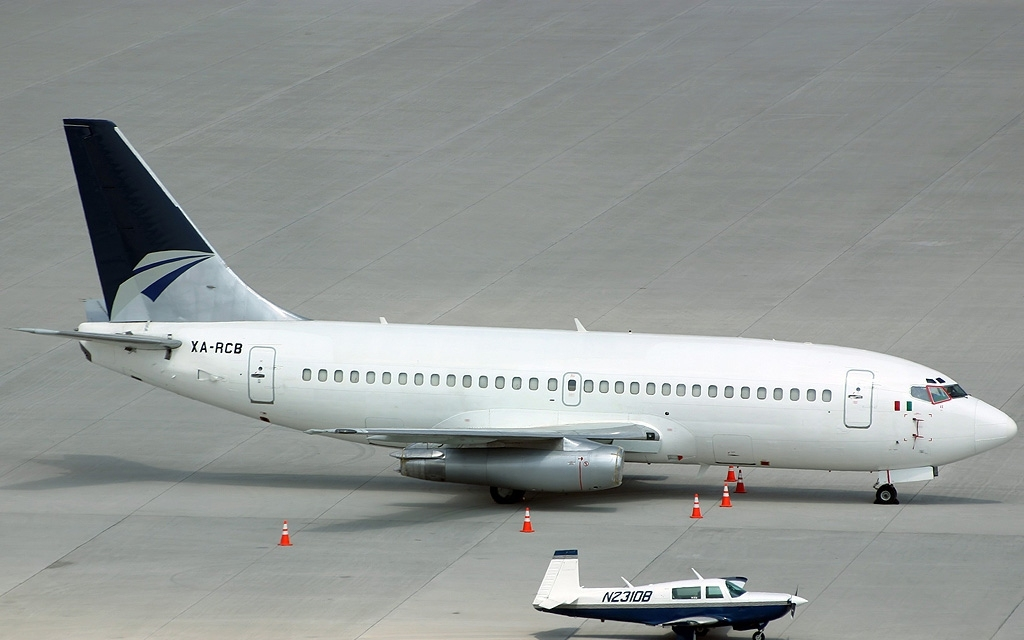
A Regional Cargo Boeing 737-2T4C Adv. at Querétaro Intercontinental Airport.

Regionalcargo Holdings, S.A. de C.V., operating as Regional Cargo, was a Mexican cargo airline. Its headquarters were on the grounds of Querétaro International Airport and in Colón, Querétaro, near Santiago de Querétaro.

== History ==
Regional Cargo was founded by Juan M. Rodríguez Anza, Ernesto Díaz González and Juan Ignacio Steta, so it is run by 100% Mexican capital with the investment of investors that saw in this company a big opportunity of development in this sector.

The airline started operations at the city of Querétaro on July 7, 2006.

== Destinations ==
Regional Cargo operated the following scheduled services:

- Mexico
  - Guadalajara - Guadalajara International Airport
  - Mexico City - Mexico City International Airport
  - La Paz - La Paz International Airport
  - Monterrey - Monterrey International Airport
  - Querétaro - Querétaro Intercontinental Airport hub
  - Toluca - Toluca International Airport
  - Puebla - Puebla International Airport
  - Mérida - Mérida International Airport
  - Cancún - Cancún International Airport

== Fleet ==
The Regional Cargo fleet included the following aircraft (as of 8 November 2008) :

- ATR 42-300F
- Boeing 737-200C
