= Querétaro Aerospace Cluster =

Mexico City hub for aerospace

Located in the centre of the country, Querétaro is one of the most densely populated states in Mexico. It is home to the Querétaro Aerospace Cluster, the fastest-growing hub for aerospace in the country, according to the Secretariat for the Sustainable Development of Querétaro (SEDESU).

== Overview ==
In 2012, eight years after the inauguration of the city's Intercontinental Airport, a group of multinational corporations that included Airbus, Delta and Bombardier joined forces with local entrepreneurs, research centres and educational institutions to form an innovation cluster. One of these institutions was the University of Aeronautics of Querétaro (UNAQ), the country's sole university specializing in the aerospace industry, founded in 2007.

A number of factors have contributed to the cluster's growth: the provision of education targeting the development of competencies; the internationalization of markets; the presence of local suppliers; joint ventures; and the promotion of innovation and technological development. For example, companies based within the cluster have concluded agreements with UNAQ to develop training programmes tailored to the needs of their technicians.

Government agencies have played a key role in the cluster's success by fostering innovation through public policies, subsidies and infrastructure development. The National Council of Science and Technology (CONACYT), for instance, has supported the Red Temática Nacional de Aeronáutica, a network of researchers, entrepreneurs and students who collaborate on project development.

CONACYT has also supported the Laboratory for Testing and Aeronautical Technology (LABTA), which evaluates the durability of components and materials used in aircraft, through three of CONACYT's research centres: the Centre for Research and Technological Development in Electrochemistry (CIDETEQ), the Centre for Engineering and Industrial Development (CIDESI) and the Centre for Advanced Technology (CIATEQ).

Since 2019, the Querétaro Aerospace Cluster has hosted FAMEX, the biggest aerospace fair in Latin America. Mexican exports of aerospace products progressed by 14% per year between 2010 and 2016. Over the same period, FDI inflows cumulated at about US$1.3 billion and the number of aerospace companies in Mexico rose from 241 to 330. Of these, 40 are based at the Querétaro Aerospace Cluster.

== Sources ==
This article incorporates text from a free content work. Licensed under CC BY-SA 3.0 IGO Text taken from Latin America, In: UNESCO Science Report: the Race Against Time for Smarter Development., Gabriela Dutrénit, Carlos Aguirre-Bastos, Martín Puchet and Mónica Salazar, UNESCO.
