= TF1 (disambiguation) =

TF1 is a French commercial television network.

TF1 may also refer to:

- Team Fortress 1, also known as Team Fortress Classic, a video game made by Valve Corporation
- Trump Force One, an aircraft owned and operated by Donald Trump
- Autopista TF-1, a motorway of the island of Tenerife (Canary Islands)
- TF1 (trench fighter), a variant of the Sopwith Camel
- Transformers One, a 2024 film
