= SARO (airline) =

Airline from Mexico

Servicios Aereos Rutas Oriente
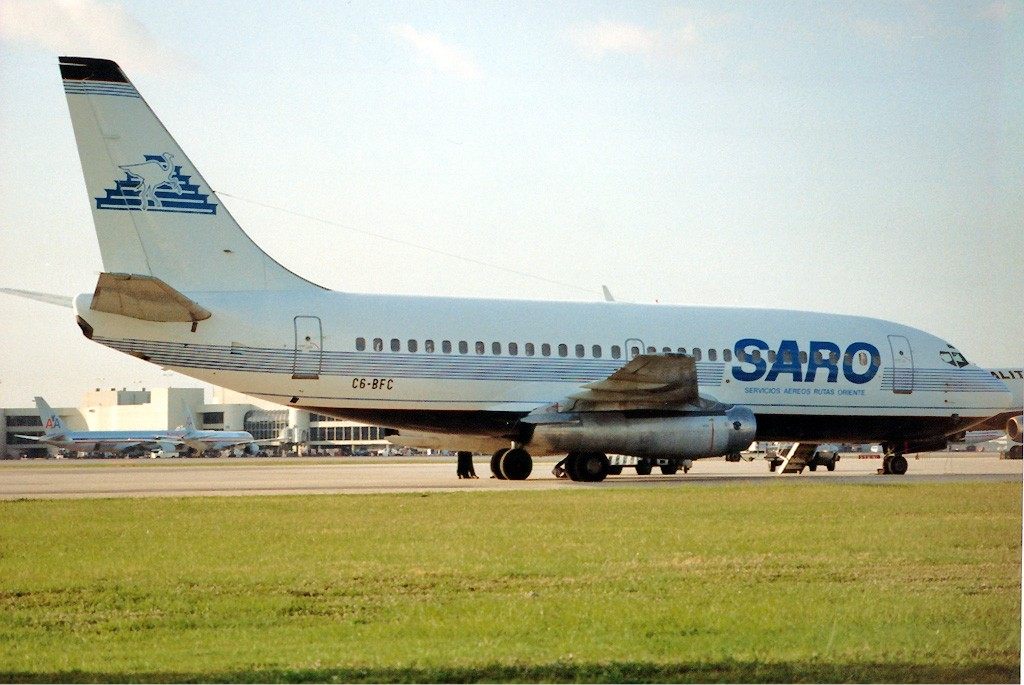
- A SARO Boeing 737 at Miami International Airport in 1992
IATA	ICAO	Call sign
UF	SRO	AEREOS ORIENTE
- Commenced operations: March 18, 1991; 35 years ago
- Ceased operations: January 15, 1995; 31 years ago
- Destinations: 18
- Headquarters: Monterrey, Mexico

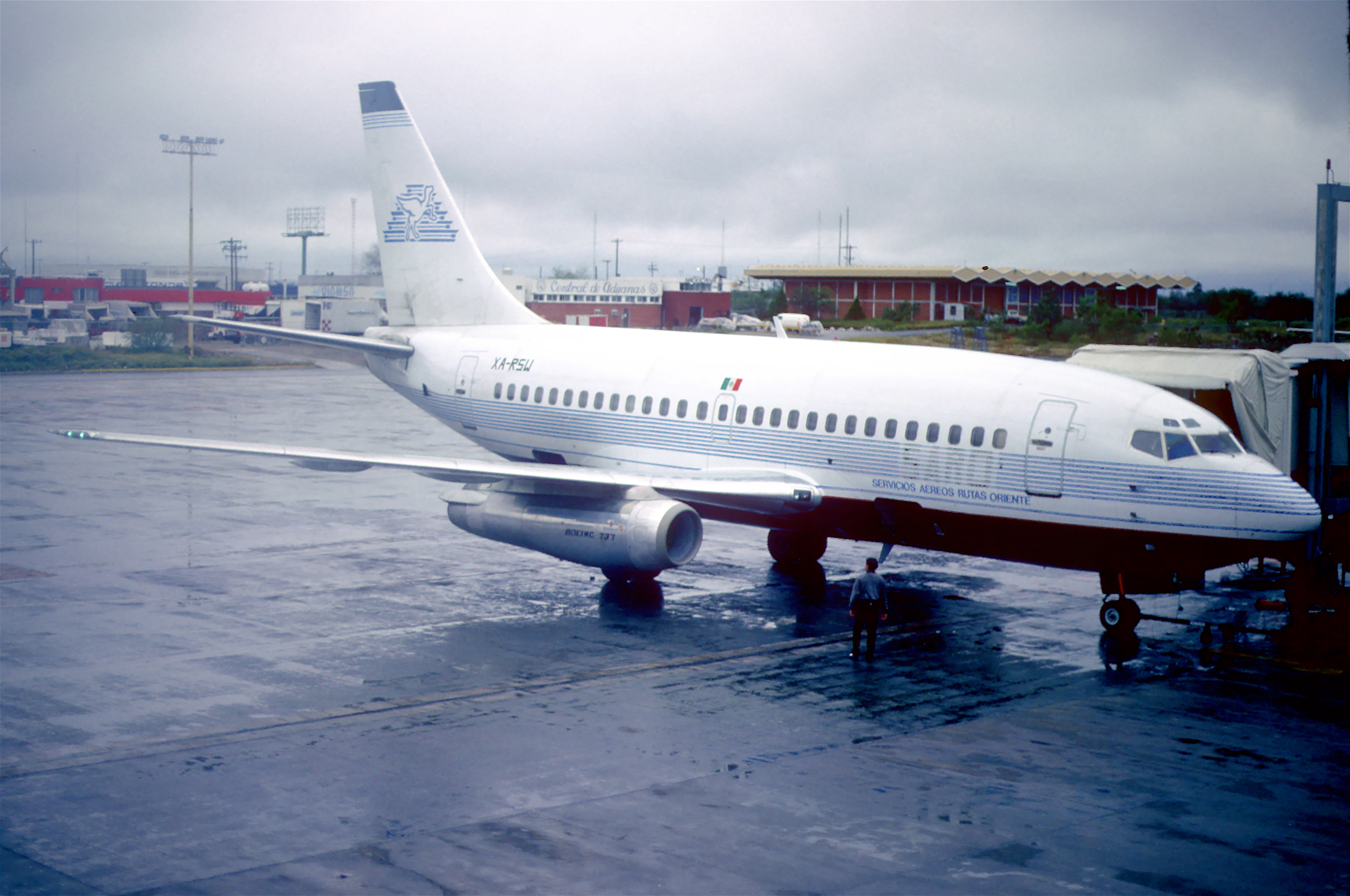
A Servicios Aéreos Rutas de Oriente Boeing 737-130 (XA-RSW)

Servicios Aéreos Rutas Oriente, S.A. de C.V. (commonly known as SARO) was an airline based in Monterrey, Mexico. The airline was established in 1991 and had its first flight on March 18 of that year. Due to their low prices, SARO was one of the first low-cost airlines in Mexico and America. It operated scheduled and charter flights throughout the Mexican Republic. SARO ceased all operations in 1995.

== Airline motto ==
The airline's motto, "Una Aerolínea con todo... para todos!" ("An airline with everything... for everybody!"), embodied the "low-fare" nature of the airline, uncommon in Mexico at that time.

== Difficulties and struggles ==
SARO was one of the first low-cost domestic airlines, starting many years before the modern ones. However, it was plagued by unfavorable conditions, strong competition from more established airlines such as Mexicana and Aeromexico (which at the time were both part of the government-run CINTRA) as well as from TAESA, owned by then-Secretary of Tourism Carlos Hank González. It was founded by private investors led by Samuel Rodriguez from Monterrey, Mexico who owned a bus company. However, the large operating costs of a scheduled airline against many difficulties, some placed by the established operators at the government-owned CINTRA, others by the official fuel supplier and the governmental airport operators conglomerate (ASA), were impossible to overcome.

Concurrently, many corners were cut. Crews consisted of captains with varying experience, together with an inexperienced co-pilot (at the time, the concept of pilot-flying and pilot-assisting were not truly present). The captain was the only one truly in command, with the co-pilot merely being present by requirement; almost all take-offs and landings were made by the captains. Training was limited and performed in an old-fashioned way by an experienced Chief of Pilots imparting practice on captains and first officers as well. Equipment was decrepit and often second-hand. Maintenance was performed in other countries because of insufficient infrastructure in Mexico. It was common for flights to carry one or two mechanics on board for routine maintenance (and frequent minor repairs). Some of these mechanics were from Mexicana, and were working in their "spare time", due to their familiarity with old Boeing equipment.

Many times, the flights became increasingly delayed for various reasons: lack of equipment due to maintenance or various failures, or lack of fuel due to debts with the official supplier (NACOA). In addition, many airports assigned SARO planes undesirable embarkment and disembarkment times, which resulted in passenger discomfort and dissatisfaction. As a result, SARO's only true selling-point was its low fares, frequently less than a third of those of the two major national airlines.

By the end of its troubled and short career, SARO was nearly bankrupt, with high debt, failing equipment, and several serious incidents. Delays were very frequent, and crews were forced to make unplanned stops at intermediate points directed by their management, in order to pick up more passengers to fill nearly-empty flights. By 1993, SARO was banned from flying to the U.S. due to several safety violations. The 1994 Mexican peso crisis proved to be the airline's death-knell.

== Incident ==
In 1994, at Poza Rica, Veracruz, a SARO Boeing 737 overshot (touched down more than half the length of the already short runway) and overran the end of the single Runway 13, stopping close to the seashore. The extreme braking locked the brakes, blowing all four main tires and damaged the wheels. The terrified passengers disembarked safely with some help from airport and Pemex personnel. No one was hurt, but the plane was carrying a group of children returning to Ciudad del Carmen. Many families became infuriated with the airline, ending the last remaining confidence of the public. To add insult to injury, the inexperienced mechanics at the airport damaged the wing fuel tanks when trying to raise the 737 on jacks in an attempt to repair the landing gear as soon as possible, to be able to move the plane. That damage delayed the maneuver, which resulted in the crippled plane giving a bad image for several days to other companies' arriving flights.

== Destinations ==
- Acapulco - Acapulco International Airport
- Cancún - Cancún International Airport
- Ciudad del Carmen - Ciudad del Carmen International Airport
- Culiacán - Federal de Bachigualato International Airport
- Guadalajara - Guadalajara International Airport
- León - Del Bajío International Airport
- Mazatlán - Mazatlán International Airport
- Mexico City - Mexico City International Airport
- Miami - Miami International Airport
- Minatitlán - Minatitlán/Coatzacoalcos National Airport
- Monterrey - Monterrey International Airport
- Orlando - Orlando International Airport
- Puebla - Hermanos Serdán International Airport
- Reynosa - General Lucio Blanco International Airport
- Tampico - General Francisco Javier Mina International Airport
- Tepic - Amado Nervo International Airport
- Tijuana - Tijuana International Airport
- Torreón - Francisco Sarabia International Airport

== Fleet ==
Some of the aircraft ever operated by SARO:

SARO fleet
Aircraft	Total	Introduced	Retired	Notes
Jet aircraft
BAC 1-11	1	1991	1993	Only BAC 1-11 operator in Mexico

== Services ==
The airline offered complimentary soft drinks, juices, beers and snacks on most of its flights.
