= Aviación del Noroeste =

Airline based in Hermosillo, Mexico

IATA	ICAO	Call sign
OC	ANW	AVINOR
- Founded: 1988; 38 years ago
- Ceased operations: 1995; 31 years ago
- Headquarters: Hermosillo, Mexico

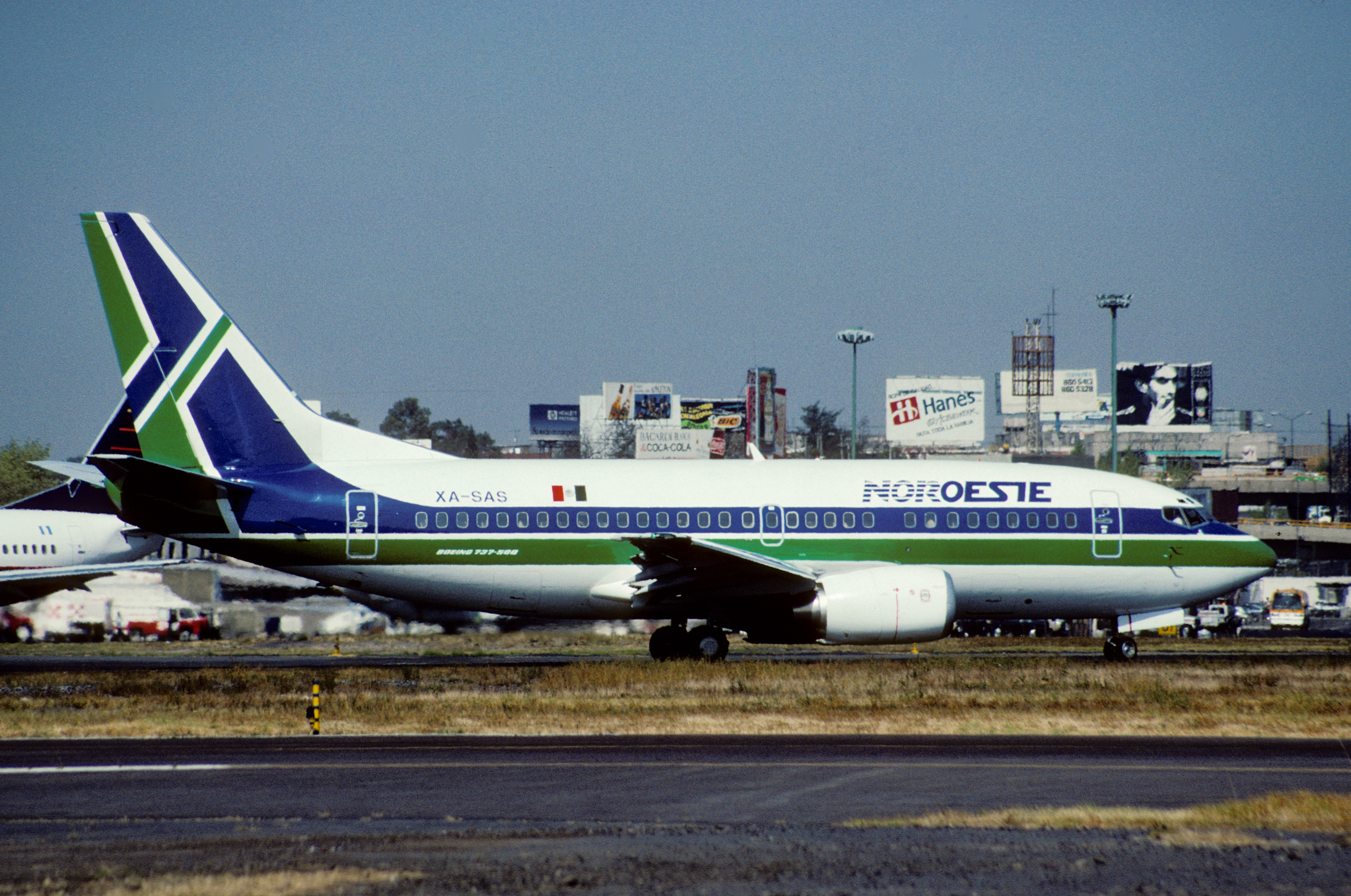
An Aviación del Noroeste Boeing 737-5Y0 (XA-SAS) at Mexico City International Airport

Aviación del Noroeste S.A de C.V was a Mexican airline based in Hermosillo, Mexico. It was shut down in 1995 and is currently defunct.

== History ==
The airline was established in 1988 with two Fokker F27 Friendship turboprop aircraft, beginning with flights to the island destination of Cedros, Mexico. In 1989, routes to Mazatlan, Mexico were added. The airline also received a Boeing 727-200 from Mexicana de Aviacion to operate flights to Toluca, Mexico and Mexico City, but the aircraft was never operated in scheduled passenger service. In 1990, TAESA, a Mexican air carrier, acquired the airline and supplied it with more F27 propjets. In 1992, the airline was bought out by Grupo Hermanos Abed ("Abed Brothers Group", abbreviated as GHA) a general aviation investment company. Abed Brothers Group is also the owner of the group Hoteles Aristos, a hotel chain based in Mexico City and directed by Alberto Abed and his brother, Asclepiodoto Abed. Alberto was hired to run both Aeroliteral, another Mexican air carrier, and TAESA, which allowed the airline to obtain three ATR 42 regional turboprops. In the same year the airline was planning to begin a new service to Mexico City operated with a Boeing 737-500 leased from TAESA. In February 1994, the Abed brothers encountered legal disputes and, after many court proceedings, Asclepiodoto retired the 737 and one ATR 42 to Noroeste. Shortly thereafter, Asclepiodoto left GHA and retired to Buenos Aires, while Alberto continued directing the company. Then, on February 10, 1994, Alberto died in a car accident in Toluca. Under the ownership of TAESA, Noroeste managed to continue to operate for another year after his death. Finally in 1995, TAESA halted the airline's operation, and it has not operated since.

== Destinations in 1989 ==
According to the airline's route map, the following destinations in Mexico and the U.S. were being served in 1989 with all flights being operated with Fokker F27 Friendship turboprop aircraft:

- Chihuahua
- Ciudad Juarez
- Ciudad Obregon
- Guaymas
- Hermosillo
- Mazatlan
- Mexicali
- Phoenix
- Tijuana
- Tucson
- Ciudad De Mexico
