= TAESA Lineas Aéreas =

Low cost airline

Transportes Aéreos Ejecutivos, SA
IATA	ICAO	Call sign
GD	TEJ	TRANSEJECUTIVOS
- Founded: April 27, 1988; 38 years ago
- Ceased operations: February 21, 2000; 26 years ago
- Hubs: Mexico City International Airport
- Focus cities: Monterrey; Guadalajara; Tijuana
- Fleet size: 30
- Destinations: 40
- Headquarters: Mexico City, Mexico
- Key people: Alberto Abed Schekaiban; Carlos Salinas de Gortari
- Employees: 4,000 (in 1994)
- Website: taesa.com.mx

TAESA (Transportes Aéreos Ejecutivos S.A.) was a low cost airline with its headquarters in No. 27 of Hangar Zone C on the grounds of Mexico City International Airport in Mexico City, Mexico.

== History ==
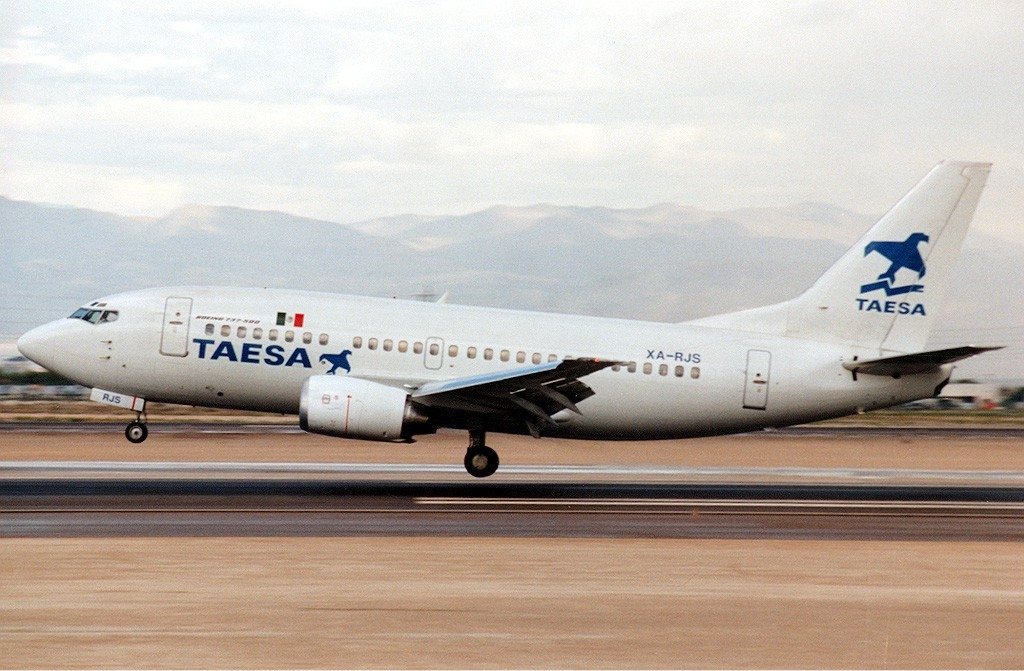
A former TAESA Boeing 737-500 at Las Vegas in 1992

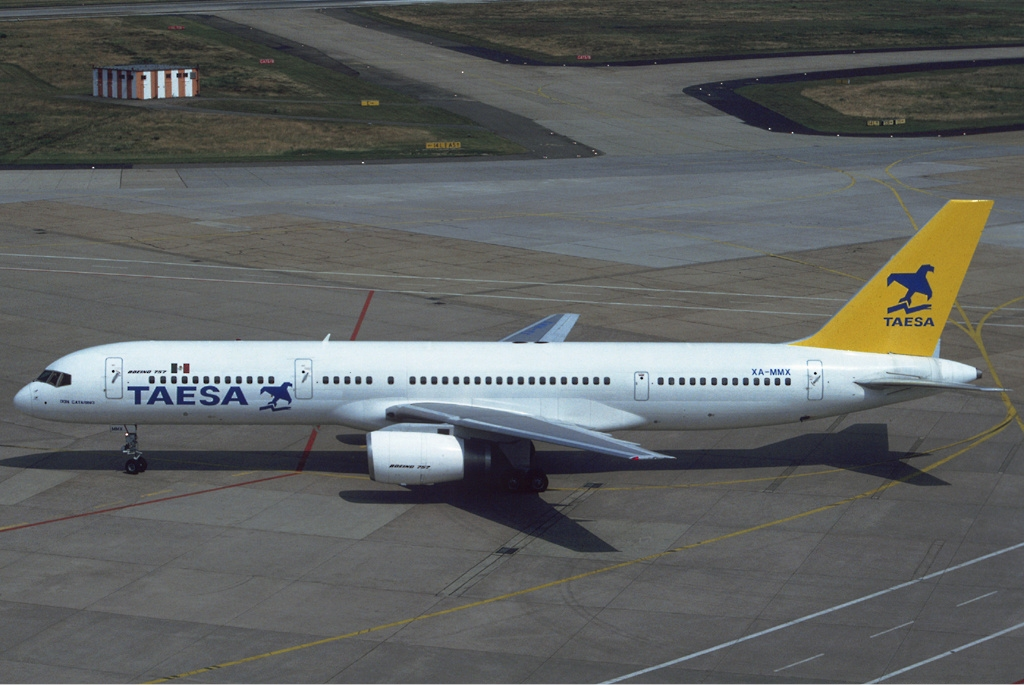
A TAESA Boeing 757 in 1993

The airline, owned by Carlos Hank González legally represented by Alberto Abed Schekaiban, was established on April 27, 1988, operating executive business aircraft and later on in 1989 received their first Boeing 727-100 which was used to launch regularly scheduled passenger service. TAESA began growing rapidly using 727s in airline service. In 1991, they received their first Boeing 757-200 and became the first commercial airline in Mexico to operate this aircraft type. Also in 1991, several Boeing 737-300s were added with additional 757s and a sole Boeing 767-300 being added as well to a fleet of Boeing 737-200/300/400/500 jetliners. TAESA was at that time the first Boeing 737-500 operator in Latin America. During the first half of the 1990s, TAESA was quite successful flying cargo for DHL and Serpaprosa with their Boeing 727-100Cs. Also during this time, several 737s were leased to Garuda Indonesia to make Asian flights. Meanwhile, they won charter contracts from companies such as Apple Vacations. By 1992, the airline was operating many charter flights to cities in Canada, Europe and the USA. In the domestic market, TAESA started a fare war with the main carriers, Aeroméxico and Mexicana.

In 1995, TAESA launched "crediTAESA", a program that allowed its passengers to fly with a minimum down payment and 12 monthly repayments. The airline also launched a simple frequent flyer program in that year, which rewarded travelers with one free ticket per every five booked. A large percentage of ticket sales were made at shopping malls and supermarkets, where TAESA held booths. At its peak, TAESA had a market share of 27% of the Mexican domestic airline market.

After the 1995 downturn in the Mexican economy, they removed newer model jetliners in favor of older Boeing 727-100 and 727-200 aircraft and also added Douglas DC-9-15s, McDonnell Douglas DC-10-30s and later a pair of Airbus A300B4s.

TAESA was the first Mexican airline to fly scheduled passenger service to Japan with two flights a week operated during a four-month time period in 1995.

The airline was having regulatory and maintenance issues for quite some time with a constant anti-labor politics after the accident of Flight 725 resulted in the suspension of its license, hastening the airline's demise. The airline had over 43 serious violations of Mexican aviation safety laws upon its suspension in 1999.

After the accident of Flight 725, the airline went through a huge inspection on behalf of the Mexican General Directorate of Civil Aeronautics and was subject to comply certain security issues to resume operations. However, unable to repay debts of US$400 million, the airline declared bankruptcy on February 21, 2000. A last-minute deal with potential investors, including Continental Airlines, to buy TAESA ultimately failed.

Some of the staff, assets, and routes were taken over by Líneas Aéreas Azteca, which was established on 9 May 2000 and started operations on 1 June 2000, inheriting TAESA's domestic services, but operating them with modern Boeing 737-700 aircraft.

TAESA was one of Mexico's first low-cost carriers. World boxing champion Julio César Chávez was one of TAESA's share-holders; he used to advertise the airline during his boxing fights, having TAESA's name and logo emblazoned on his trunks.

== Affiliates ==
- Aviación del Noroeste
- LaTur
- NSW New Southways- Cargo division
- Puebla Air Lines

== Destinations ==
TAESA served the following cities in Mexico:

- ACA – Acapulco, Guerrero, Mexico – Alvarez International
- AGU – Aguascalientes, Aguascalientes – Lic. Jesús Terán Peredo International
- BJX – León/Guanajuato, Guanajuato, Mexico – Del Bajio
- CEN – Ciudad Obregón, Sonora, Mexico
- CUN – Cancún, Quintana Roo, Mexico
- CUU – Chihuahua, Mexico – General Roberto Fierro Villalobos
- CJS – Ciudad Juarez, Chihuahua, Mexico – Abraham Gonzalez International
- CUL – Culiacan, Sinaloa, Mexico - Bachigualato Federal
- CZM – Cozumel, Quintana Roo, Mexico
- GDL – Guadalajara, Jalisco, Mexico – Miguel Hidalgo International
- HMO – Hermosillo, Sonora, Mexico – General Ignacio Pesqueira Garcia
- LOM - Lagos de Moreno, Jaliso, Mexico - Francisco P.V. y R.
- MID – Mérida, Yucatán, Mexico – Mérida International
- MEX – Mexico City, Distrito Federal, Mexico – Benito Juarez International
- MTY – Monterrey, Nuevo León, Mexico – Escobedo
- MLM – Morelia, Michoacan, Mexico – General Francisco J. Mujica
- PVR – Puerto Vallarta, Jalisco, Mexico – Gustavo Diaz Ordaz
- SLW – Saltillo, Coahuila, Mexico – Plan de Guadalupe International
- TAP – Tapachula, Chiapas, Mexico – Tapachula International
- TIJ – Tijuana, Baja California, Mexico – General Abelardo L. Rodríguez
- TRC – Torreon, Coahuila, Mexico – Francisco Sarabia
- UPN – Uruapan, Michoacan, Mexico – Lic. Ignacio Lopez Rayon International
- ZCL – Zacatecas, Zacatecas, Mexico – La Calera

Airports served in the United States:

- EGE – Vail/Eagle, CO, USA – Eagle County Regional
- IAD – Washington, VA, USA – Dulles Airport
- JFK – New York, NY, USA – John F. Kennedy International
- LAS – Las Vegas, NV, USA – McCarran Airport
- LAX – Los Angeles, CA, USA – Los Angeles International
- LRD – Laredo, TX, USA – International
- MIA – Miami, FL, USA – Miami International
- OAK – Oakland, CA, USA – Oakland International
- ORD – Chicago, IL, USA – O'Hare International

Airports served in Puerto Rico:

- BQN – Aguadilla, Puerto Rico – Rafael Hernandez Airport

Airports served in Japan:

- NRT – Tokyo, Japan – Narita Airport

Airports served in Germany:

- SXF – Berlin, Germany – Schönefeld Airport
- FRA – Frankfurt, Germany – Rhein – Main International
- CGN – Köln, Germany – Köln Bonn
- DUS – Düsseldorf, Germany – Düsseldorf
- LEJ – Leipzig, Germany – Leipzig Airport
- MUC – Munich, Germany – Franz – Josef Strauss

=== Codeshare agreements ===
TAESA operated code sharing services with the following airlines:

- Aviación del Noroeste
- Aviacsa
- LaTur
- Puebla Air Lines
- Servicios Aéreos Rutas Oriente

== Fleet ==
TAESA's aircraft were in an all-economy configuration. Their commercial fleet throughout its history included the following airplanes:

TAESA fleet
Aircraft	Total	Introduced	Retired	Notes
Airbus A300B4-200	2	1995	1998	
ATR 42-320	3	1992	1996	
Boeing 727-100	14	1989	2000	
Boeing 727-200	2	1994	2000	
Boeing 737-200	5	1993	2000	
Boeing 737-300	19	1991	2000	
Boeing 737-400	2	1992	2000	
Boeing 737-500	5	1992	1996	
Boeing 757-200	7	1991	2000	One acquired from Sterling later became Trump Force One.
Boeing 767-300ER	1	1992	1995	Transferred to Air Europe
Fokker F27 Friendship	1	1993	1995	
Lockheed JetStar	1	Unknown	Unknown	
McDonnell Douglas DC-9-14	2	1995	2000	Leased from Intercontinental de Aviación
McDonnell Douglas DC-9-15	3	1995	2000	Leased from Intercontinental de Aviación
McDonnell Douglas DC-9-31	1	1998	1999	Written off as Flight 725
McDonnell Douglas DC-10-30	2	1995	1997	
McDonnell Douglas DC-10-30CF	1	1998	2000	
McDonnell Douglas MD-83	1	1992	1992	Transferred to Compass Airlines
McDonnell Douglas MD-87	2	1992	1997	

== Accidents and incidents ==
Various incidents damaged the airline's image:

- On June 18, 1994, while the United States was hosting the World Cup, a Learjet 25 crashed into trees while approaching Dulles International Airport from the south. All 12 on board were killed in the accident. The cause was ruled as pilot error due to an inexperienced crew.
- In April 1997 a McDonnell Douglas DC-10 sustained damage in a landing in Santo Domingo.
- On November 9, 1999, TAESA Flight 725 covered the Tijuana–Mexico City route with a stop in Uruapan, Michoacán, Mexico. A McDonnell Douglas DC-9-31 used to fly this route. Flight 725 went down a few minutes after leaving the Uruapan International Airport en route to Mexico City. 18 people were killed in the accident, which prompted inquiries regarding the airline's safety and maintenance procedures.

== See also ==
- List of defunct airlines of Mexico
