= TAESA Flight 725 =

1999 aviation accident in Mexico

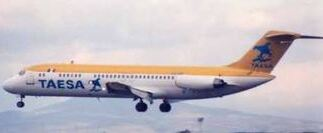
- XA-TKN, the aircraft involved in the accident

Accident
- Date: 9 November 1999
- Summary: Pilot error and spatial disorientation resulting in a deep stall and loss of control
- Site: Near Uruapan International Airport, Uruapan, Michoacán, Mexico

Aircraft
- Aircraft type: McDonnell Douglas DC-9-31
- Operator: TAESA Lineas Aéreas
- IATA flight No.: GD725
- ICAO flight No.: TEJ725
- Call sign: TRANSEJECUTIVOS 725
- Registration: XA-TKN
- Flight origin: Tijuana International Airport, Tijuana, Baja California
- 1st stopover: Guadalajara International Airport, Guadalajara, Jalisco
- Last stopover: Uruapan International Airport, Uruapan, Michoacán
- Destination: Mexico City International Airport, Mexico City
- Occupants: 18
- Passengers: 13
- Crew: 5
- Fatalities: 18
- Survivors: 0

TAESA Flight 725 was a scheduled flight originating in Tijuana International Airport and ending at Mexico City International Airport with intermediate stopovers in Guadalajara and Uruapan, that crashed shortly after departure from the latter city's airport on November 9, 1999, killing all 18 passengers and crew on board. The crash led TAESA to ground its fleet and suspend operations a year later in 2000.

== Aircraft ==
The aircraft operating the flight was an McDonnell-Douglas DC-9-31, manufactured by McDonnell-Douglas, and first entered service with Trans Australia Airlines in February 1970. It was 29 years old at the time of the accident and accumulated more than 59,000 takeoff/landing cycles and 58,000 flight hours. Before being delivered to TAESA Lineas Aéreas, it previously operated for Australian Airlines, Sunworld International Airlines, Midway Airlines, NASA and Aeroméxico.

== Passengers and crew ==
The captain was 36-year-old Jesús José Gracián. He had 5,368 flight hours. The first officer was 22-year-old Héctor Valdez, who had 250 flight hours at the time of the accident.

There were 18 people on board the DC-9 at the time it crashed, with 13 passengers and 5 crew members.

== Flight ==
The aircraft departed Uruapan for Mexico City at 18:59 local time. After rotation, the aircraft pitched up abnormally high, entered a stall, nosed over and crashed into an avocado field 5.3 kilometres (3.3 mi) south of the runway on a heading of 110 degrees. All 18 people on board were killed.

== Cause ==
Investigators determined that the crew did not use the appropriate checklists prior to departure, and during the climbout, the pilots were confused about which heading to follow. Spatial disorientation was also believed to be a factor in the crash.
