= Puebla Air Lines =

Air line in Puebla

IATA	ICAO	Call sign
-	LPA	LINEASPAL
- Founded: 1984; 42 years ago
- Commenced operations: 1985; 41 years ago
- Ceased operations: 1995; 31 years ago
- Operating bases: Puebla International Airport
- Destinations: 9
- Headquarters: Puebla, Puebla

Puebla Air Lines (PAL Aerolineas, S.A. de C.V.) was a Mexican airline based in Puebla, Puebla. The airline started operations in 1985 and operated scheduled services until 1995.

== History ==
The airline was founded in 1984 and begin commercial operations in 1985. The airline was sold in the early 1990s and became affiliate of TAESA until PAL's collapse in June 1995. The airline continued to fly international charter services until 2001 between Mexico and the U.S., under 14 CFR Part 129. 14 CFR Part 129 is, "Foreign air carriers and foreign operators of U.S.-registered aircraft engaged in common carriage".

== Destinations ==
- Cancun – Cancún International Airport
- Chihuahua – Chihuahua International Airport
- Guadalajara – Guadalajara International Airport
- Mexico City – Mexico City International Airport
- Monterrey – Monterrey International Airport
- Morelia – General Francisco Mujica International Airport
- Puebla – Puebla International Airport
- Querétaro – Ing. Fernando Espinoza Gutiérrez International Airport
- Tijuana – Tijuana International Airport

== Fleet ==
- 2 Boeing 727
