= LaTur =

IATA	ICAO	Call sign
LP	LPT	LATUR
- Founded: 1988; 38 years ago
- Ceased operations: 1992; 34 years ago

La Tur was a Mexican airline that operated from 1988 until 1992 when it was taken over by TAESA.

== Company history ==
Set up in 1988 to help develop the tourist market, La Tur began charter operations using McDonnell Douglas MD-83 aircraft. One year later, the Airbus A300-600 was introduced for flights to Europe and Asia. Plans were made to replace the MD-83s with Airbus A320 and Airbus A321, but the financial situation did not allow it.

By 1992, La Tur had too much capacity, and the A300 was leased out. The fall of the Mexican peso and the deregulation of Mexican air transport led to the take over by TAESA.

== Fleet details ==
- 5 McDonnell Douglas MD-83
- 1 McDonnell Douglas MD-87
- 1 Airbus A300B4-620 F-ODTK
- 1 Airbus A300B4-622R F-ODSX

== Destinations ==
This is a list of airports that La Tur used to fly scheduled service to before it ceased operations in 1992.

=== Hong Kong ===
- Hong Kong - Kai Tak International Airport

=== Mexico ===
- Acapulco - Acapulco International Airport
- Cancun - Cancún International Airport
- Mexico City - Mexico City International Airport
- Puerto Vallarta - Licenciado Gustavo Díaz Ordaz International Airport

=== Netherlands ===
- Amsterdam - Schiphol International Airport

=== United States ===
- Atlanta - William B. Hartsfield-Jackson Atlanta International Airport
- New York - John F. Kennedy International Airport
