= Puebla International Airport =

International airport in Puebla, Mexico

Puebla International Airport Aeropuerto Internacional de Puebla
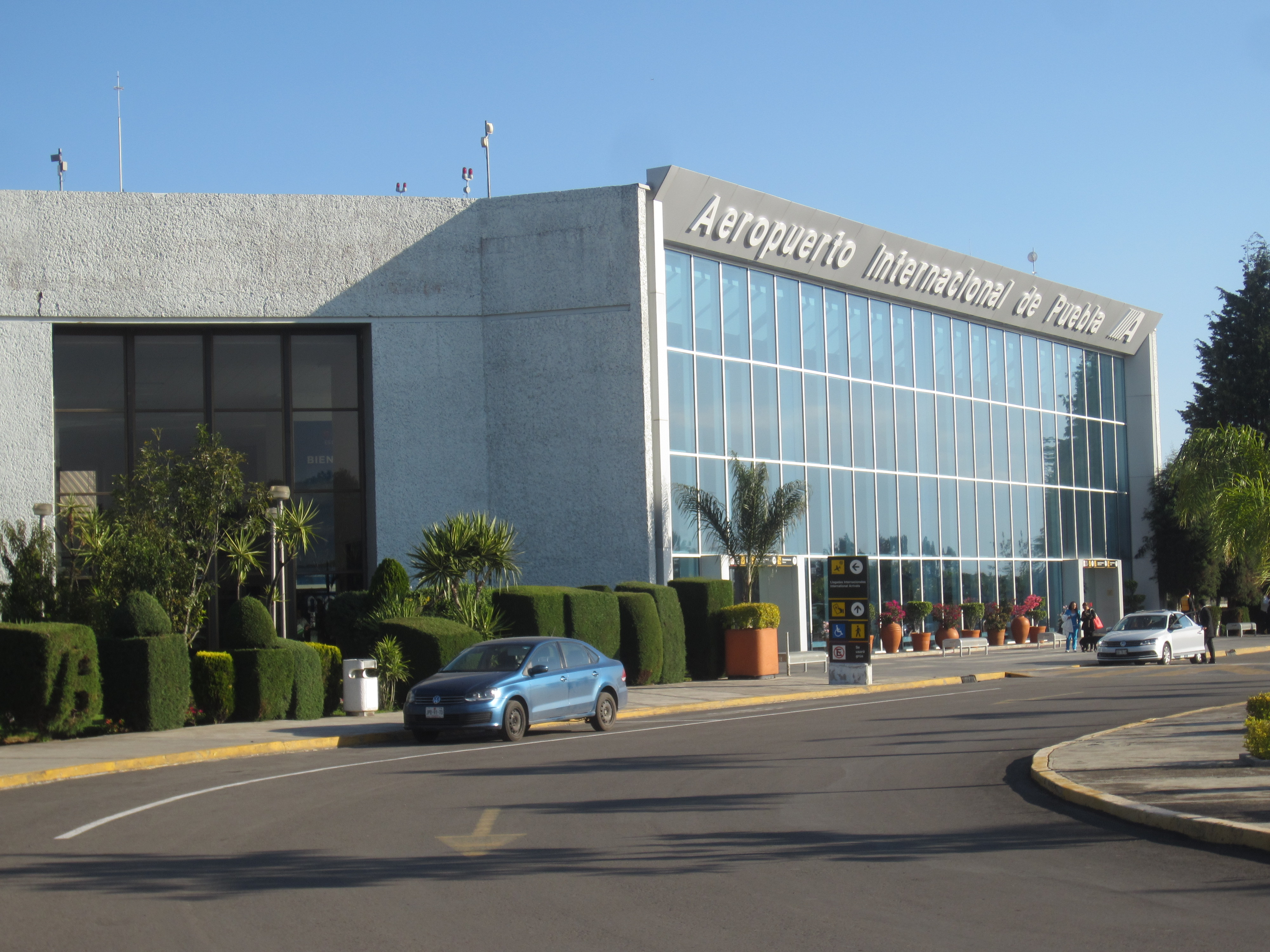
- IATA: PBC; ICAO: MMPB

Summary
- Airport type: Public
- Owner: Grupo Olmeca-Maya-Mexica (GAFSACOMM)
- Serves: Puebla Metropolitan Area
- Location: Huejotzingo, Puebla
- Hub for: Volaris (begins June 1, 2026)
- Time zone: CST (UTC−06:00)
- Elevation AMSL: 2,244 m (7,362 ft)
- Coordinates: 19°09′29″N 98°22′17″W
- Website: www.grupomundomaya.com/PBC

Maps
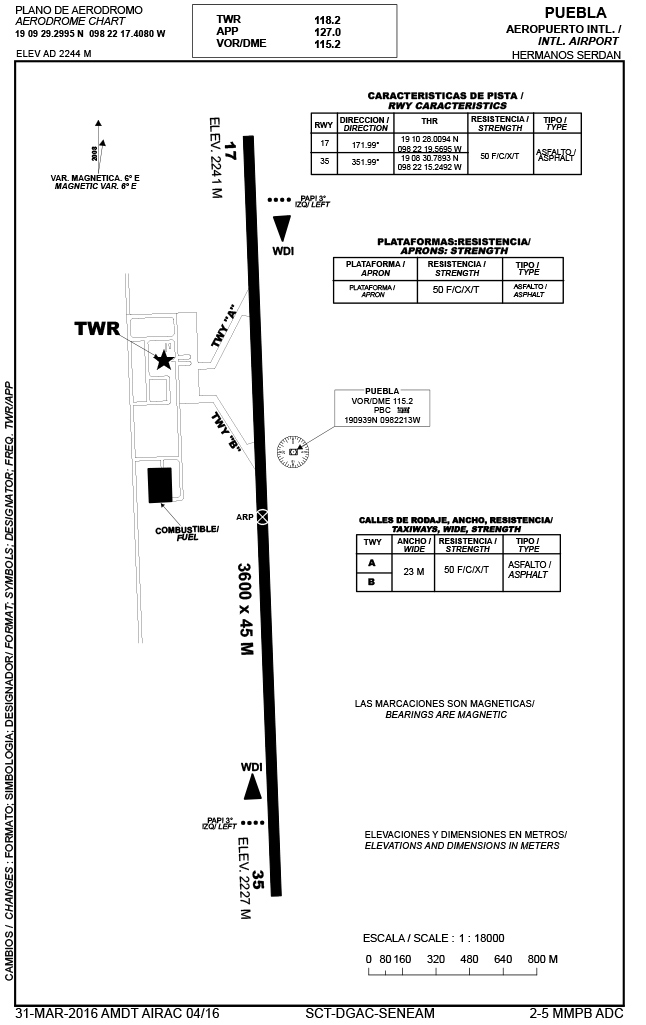

- Location of the airport in Puebla PBC (Mexico)

Runways
Direction	Length		Surface
Direction	m	ft	Surface
17/35	3,600	11,811	Asphalt

Statistics (2025)
- Total passengers: 1,255,041
- Ranking in Mexico: 25th
- Source: Agencial Federal de Aviación Civil

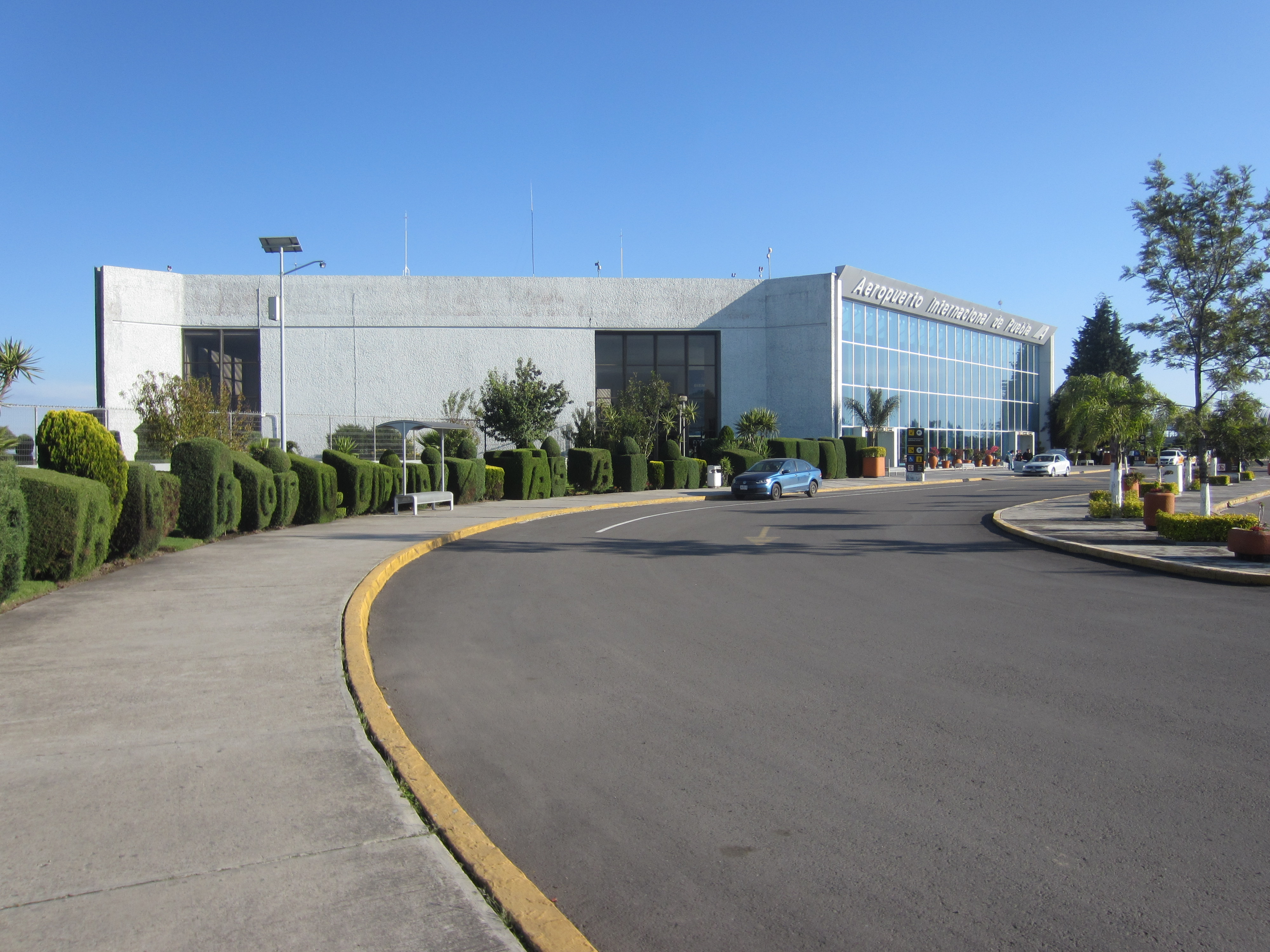
Passenger terminal

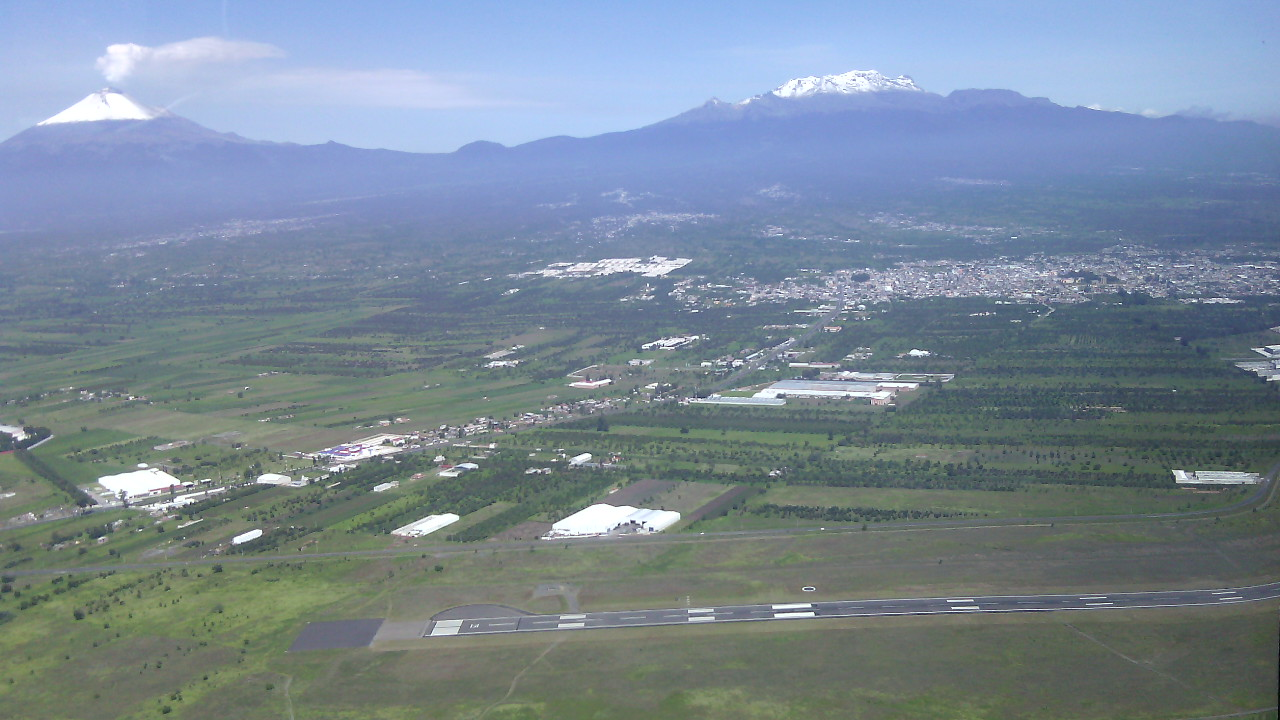
Airport runway from above

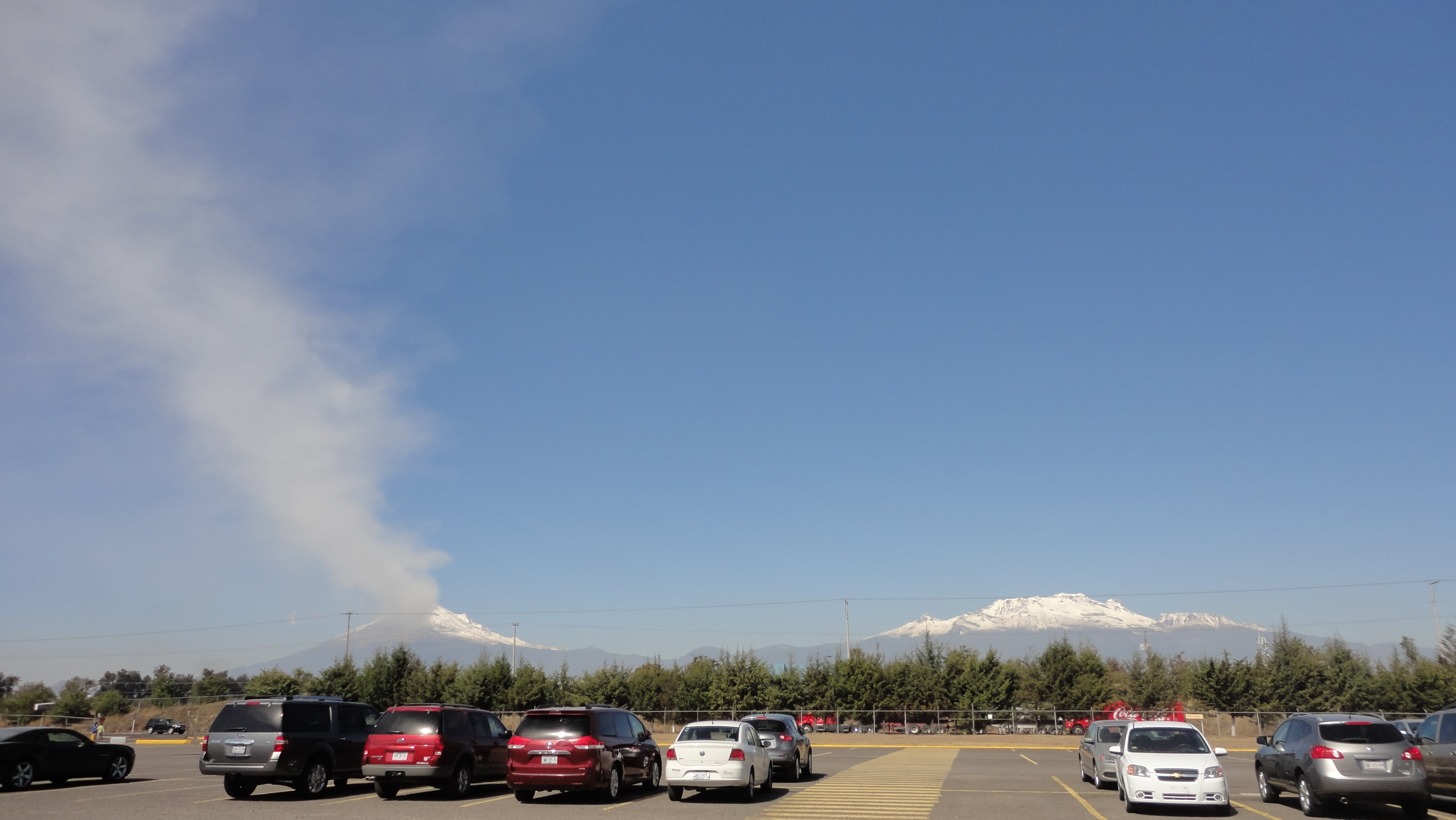
Parking lot and Popocatepetl volcano and Iztaccihuatl mountain in the background

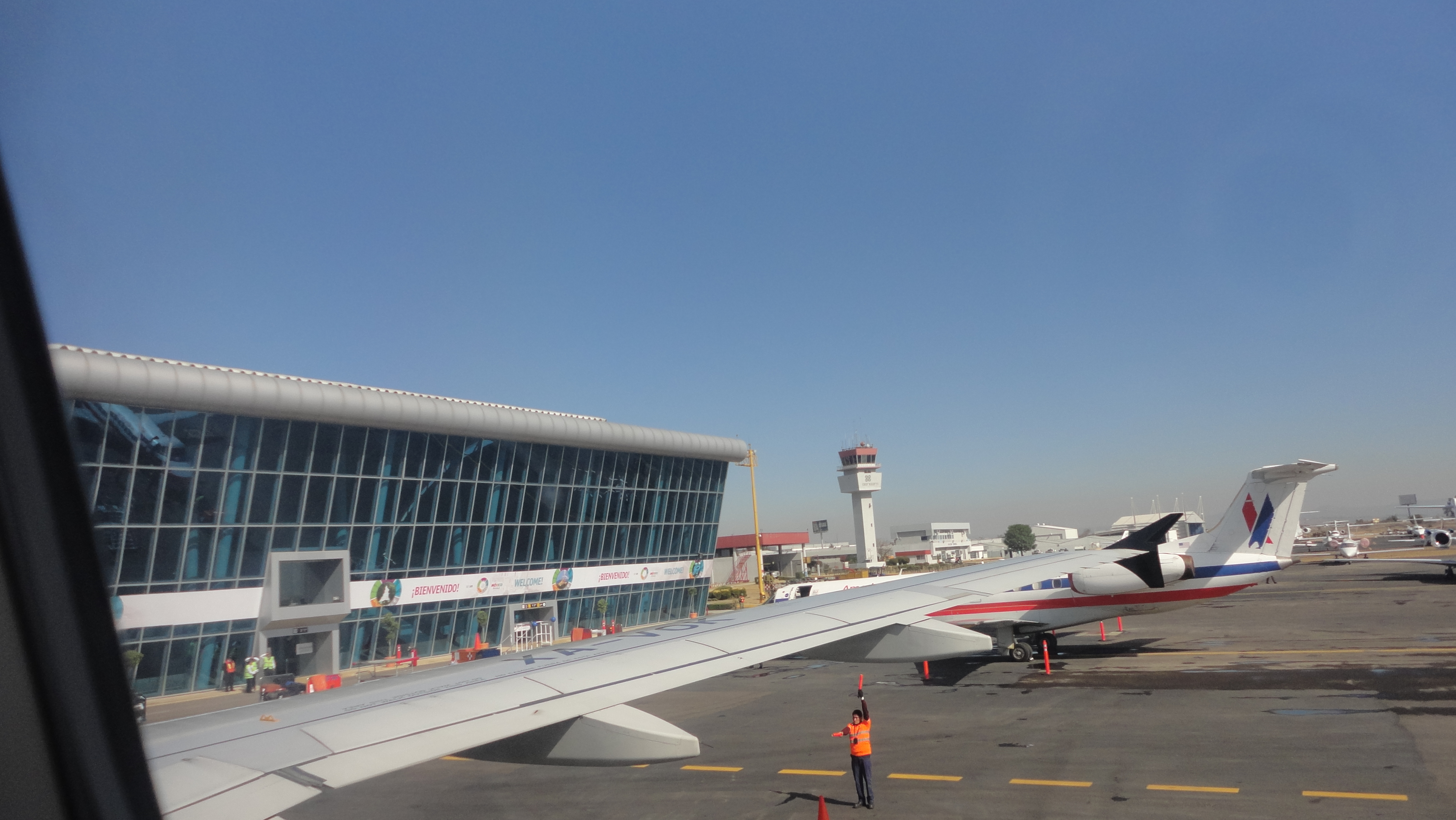
Passenger terminal airside

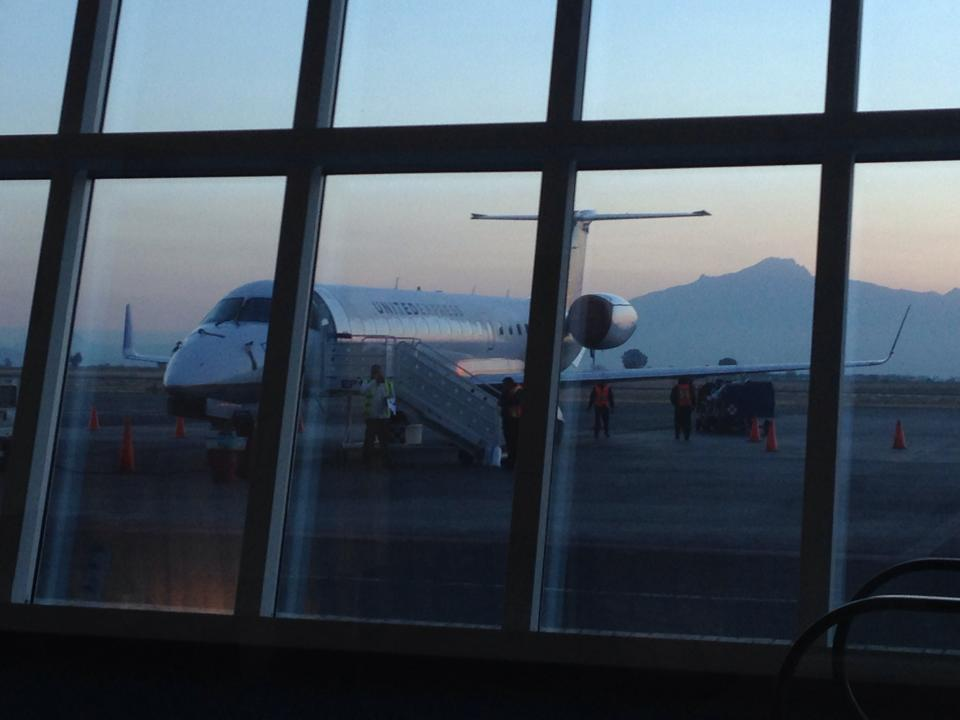
United Express Embraer ERJ 145 at PBC. Mountain Malinche in the background

Puebla International Airport (Spanish: Aeropuerto Internacional de Puebla), officially Hermanos Serdán International Airport (Spanish: Aeropuerto Internacional Hermanos Serdán) (IATA: PBC, ICAO: MMPB) is an international airport located in Huejotzingo, Puebla, Mexico. It handles national and international air traffic for the Metropolitan area of Puebla, the fourth-largest metro area in Mexico. It also supports cargo services and various executive and general aviation activities.

Puebla Airport was named after Aquiles Serdán, Máximo Serdán, and María del Carmen Serdán, known as the Serdán siblings, who were leaders of the anti-reelection movement during the Mexican Revolution. It is operated by Grupo Olmeca-Maya-Mexica (GAFSACOMM), a holding company owned by the Mexican military. The airport is one of the fastest-growing in the country, crossing the one-million passenger threshold for the first time in 2024. In 2025, it handled 1,255,041 passengers.

== History ==
The airport commenced operations in 1985, with its inaugural flight arriving from Guadalajara and operated by Mexicana de Aviación. In 1993, Puebla Air Lines started connecting Puebla to major destinations within Mexico but ceased operations in 1995 due to the Mexican peso crisis. In 1996, the airport, which began as a domestic airport, was designated as the "Hermanos Serdán" International Airport.

Operadora Estatal de Aeropuertos (OEA) assumed the airport management and development in 2001, with shared ownership among the Puebla State Government (26%), Operadora Internacional de Aeropuertos (49%), and Aeropuertos y Servicios Auxiliares (25%). In 2011, OEA was dissolved by the State Government of Puebla due to budgetary issues, and Aeropuertos y Servicios Auxiliares (ASA) took over the airport operations.

Throughout the 2000s and 2010s, there were political initiatives aimed at positioning Puebla Airport, along with Toluca, Cuernavaca, and Querétaro airports, as supplementary options for serving the Mexico City Area. Various airlines, including MexicanaLink, Copa Airlines, Aeroméxico, Aero California, and American Eagle introduced flight services at the airport. However, most air travelers to Puebla still tend to use the Mexico City International Airport, which is situated less than 100 km (65 mi) west of the city and very well connected via highways and bus services. Puebla Airport's capacities remain underutilized, even though it has the potential to serve the Puebla Metropolitan Area, which is home to nearly three and a half million inhabitants. Furthermore, the opening of Mexico City-Felipe Angeles Airport has made it more challenging for PBC to attract commercial flights.

In 2007, the Logistic Airport Center was established, offering comprehensive cargo management and commercial processing facilities. The airport experienced significant growth in passenger numbers, operations, and cargo handling during the 2010s. Over the years, the airport has faced temporary closures due to ash spewing from the nearby Popocatepetl volcano.

In 2022, the Mexican government executed the merger of several state-operated airport companies, consolidating infrastructure entities into a larger holding company known as Grupo Olmeca-Maya-Mexica, which is under the ownership of the Department of Defense (SEDENA). This action was part of the broader strategy of the López Obrador administration to engage the armed forces not only in significant infrastructure projects but also in civilian functions. This trend of militarization extended to other endeavors such as the Tren Maya, the Felipe Angeles and Tulum airports, and the revival of Mexicana de Aviación, prompting concerns regarding accountability and transparency.

== Facilities ==
The Puebla Airport is located at an elevation of 2,244 metres (7,362 ft) above mean sea level. It features a single runway with a length of 3,600 metres (11,800 ft) and an apron featuring 6 Category D aircraft stands, accommodating both commercial and cargo operations. The airport is also equipped with facilities dedicated to general and executive aviation.

The terminal building includes arrival and departure facilities for both domestic and international flights within a single-story building. It has the capacity to cater to up to 450 passengers per hour. The departures concourse comprises five gates and an airport lounge managed by the Global Lounge Network.

In addition to passenger services, Puebla Airport serves as a hub for logistics and courier companies, overseeing an annual cargo volume of two thousand tons. The cargo handled encompasses various items such as textile products, vehicle motor parts, machinery, postal items, airborne parcel services, and perishable goods like fruits and flowers.

== Airlines and destinations ==
=== Passengers ===
Airlines	Destinations
United Express	Houston–Intercontinental
Viva	Cancún, Guadalajara, Mérida, Monterrey, Tijuana
Volaris	Acapulco (begins December 1, 2026), Aguascalientes, Cancún, Chicago–O'Hare (begins December 1, 2026), Guadalajara, Houston–Intercontinental, Huatulco, Los Angeles, Newark, Puerto Escondido (begins December 1, 2026), Puerto Vallarta, San José del Cabo, Tijuana, Tuxtla Gutiérrez, Villahermosa

=== Destinations map ===
Domestic destinations from Puebla International Airport
Red = Year-round destination
Blue = Future destination
Green = Seasonal destination
International destinations from Puebla International Airport
Red = Year-round destination
Blue = Future destination
Green = Seasonal destination

== Airlines previously flying to Puebla International Airport ==
Airlines
Aero California, Aeromar, Aeroméxico, Aeroméxico Connect, Aladia, Alma de México, Avolar, American Eagle, Continental Express, Copa Airlines, Líneas Aéreas Azteca, Mexicana, MexicanaLink, Puebla Air Lines

== Statistics ==
=== Annual Traffic ===
Passenger statistics at PBC
Year	Air operations	change %	Cargo (t)	change %	Passengers	change %
2006	16,328	Steady	603	Steady	201,094	Steady
2007	23,181	▲41.97%	593	▼1.65%	428,791	▲113.22%
2008	24,753	▲6.78%	648	▲9.27%	530,320	▲23.67%
2009	19,845	▼19.82%	1,091	▲68.36%	344,699	▼35.0%
2010	19,331	▼2.59%	1,619	▲48.39%	318,037	▼7.73%
2011	17,416	▼9.90%	1,141	▼29.52%	218,401	▼31.32%
2012	18,130	▲4.09%	798	▼30.06%	264,085	▲20.91%
2013	15,925	▼12.16%	666	▼16.54%	292,152	▲10.62%
2014	17,080	▲7.25%	461	▼30.78%	285,041	▼2.43%
2015	19,817	▲16.02%	492	▲6.72%	327,811	▲15.0%
2016	19,227	▼2.97%	846	▲71.95%	383,361	▲16.94%
2017	20,258	▲5.36%	1,166	▲37.82%	511,833	▲33.51%
2018	20,391	▲0.66%	1,236	▲6.01%	685,583	▲34.10%
2019	19,723	▼3.28%	842	▼31.85%	761,575	▲11.08%
2020	11,065	▼43.90%	1,012	▲20.19%	384,103	▼49.56%
2021	12,854	▲16.17%	2,706	▲167.39%	565,387	▲47.20%
2022	18,164	▲41.31%	7,127	▲163.38%	790,931	▲39.89%
2023	20,869	▲14.89%	3,794	▼46.77%	935,500	▲18.28%
2024	18,755	▼10.13%	4,232	▲11.54%	1,059,073	▲10.47%
2025	22,495	▲19.94%	4,867	▲15.00%	1,255,041	▲18.50%

=== Busiest routes ===
Busiest routes from PBC (Jan–Dec 2025)
Rank	Airport	Passengers
1	Cancún, Quintana Roo	176,706
2	Tijuana, Baja California	169,279
3	Monterrey, Nuevo León	122,293
4	Guadalajara, Jalisco	95,533
5	Mérida, Yucatán	30,159
6	Houston–Intercontinental, United States	13,281

== See also ==
- List of the busiest airports in Mexico
- List of airports in Mexico
- List of airports by ICAO code: M
- List of busiest airports in North America
- List of the busiest airports in Latin America
- Transportation in Mexico
- Metropolitan areas of Mexico
- Mexico City megalopolis
- Puebla Metropolitan Area
- Central de Autobuses Puebla
