= Trump Force One =

Jet owned by Donald Trump

N757AF
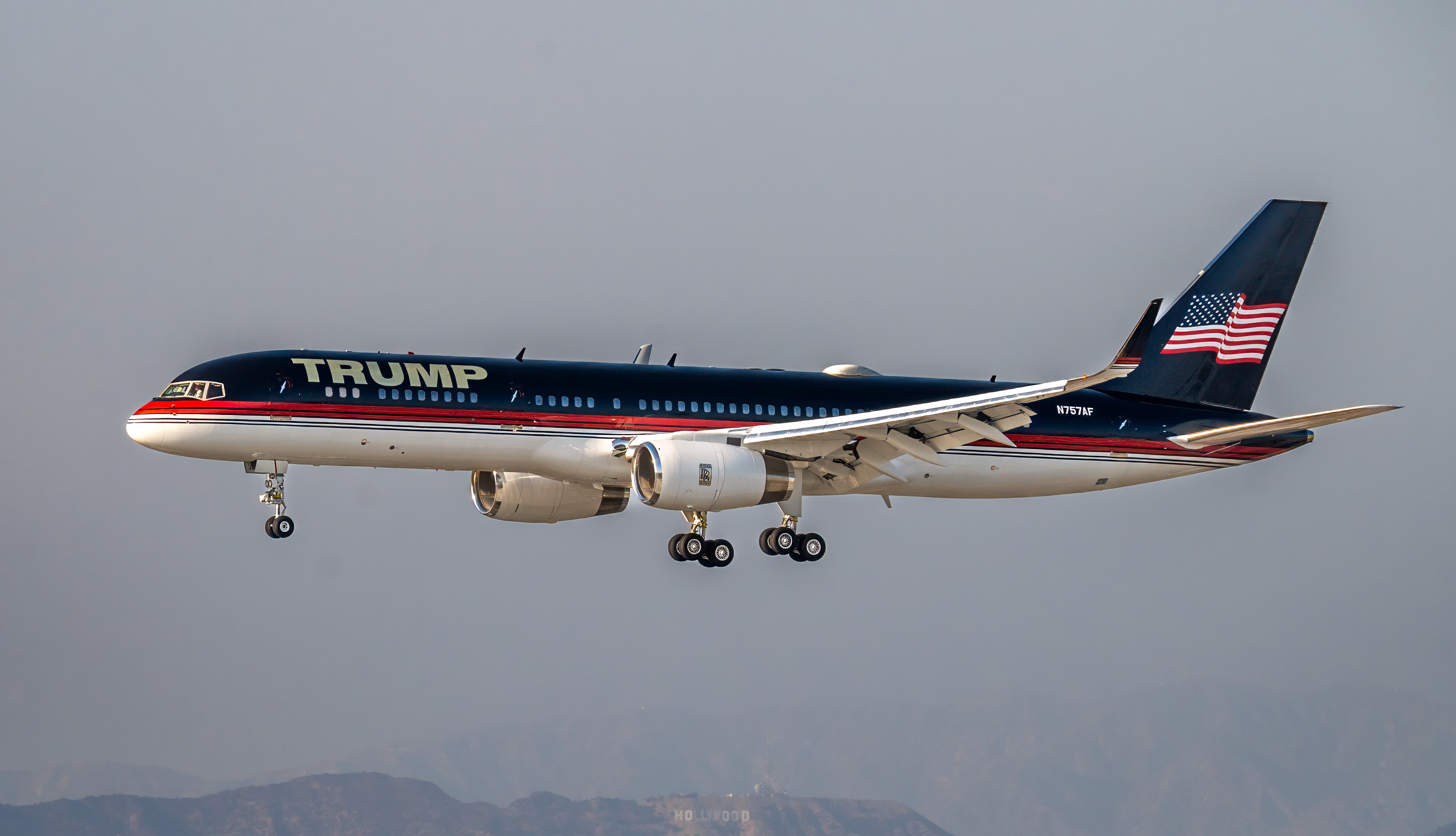
- N757AF landing at Santa Barbara Municipal Airport in 2024

General information
- Other names: Trump Force One; Tyson 1
- Type: Boeing 757-2J4ER
- Manufacturer: Boeing
- Status: In service
- Owners: The Trump Organization
- Registration: N757AF

History
- First flight: May 21, 1991

External videos
- Mr. Trump's 757, The Trump Organization

The Trump Organization's Boeing 757, nicknamed Trump Force One after the U.S. presidential plane, Air Force One, is an aircraft owned and operated by Donald Trump. The nickname gained use during Trump's presidential campaign of 2016.

== History ==
=== Boeing 727 (1997–2011) ===
The predecessor of Trump Force One was a Boeing 727 registered as VP-BDJ. The plane had previously been operated as part of the Trump Shuttle fleet until a 1992 merger. Donald Trump re-purchased the aircraft in 1997 and used it until 2011, when he sold it in favor of the 757. The 727 included a private quarters with a queen-size bed and full bath and seating for 23 passengers in three separate salons.

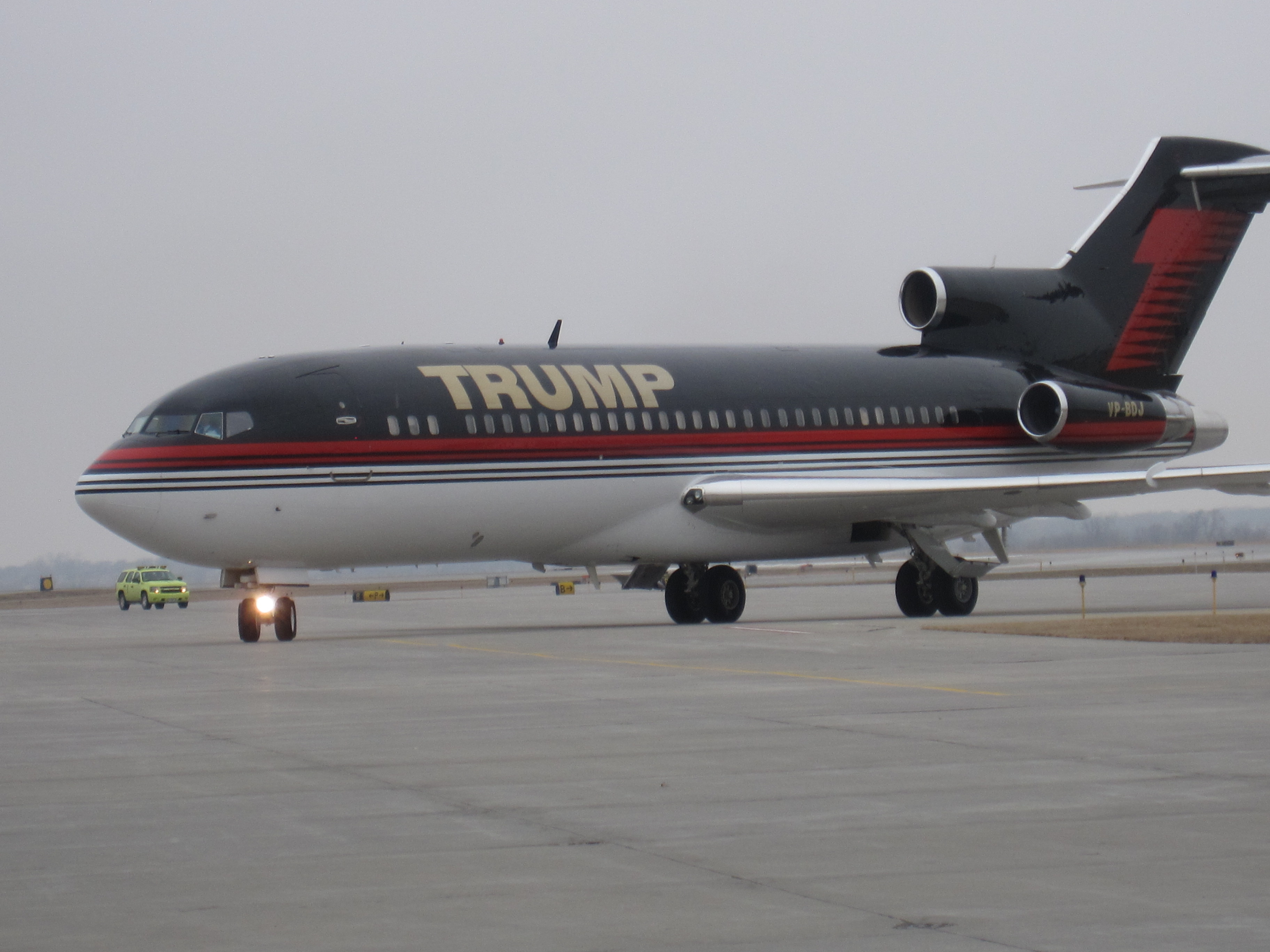
Trump's Boeing 727 aircraft, the predecessor of Trump Force One

=== Boeing 757-200 (2011–Present) ===
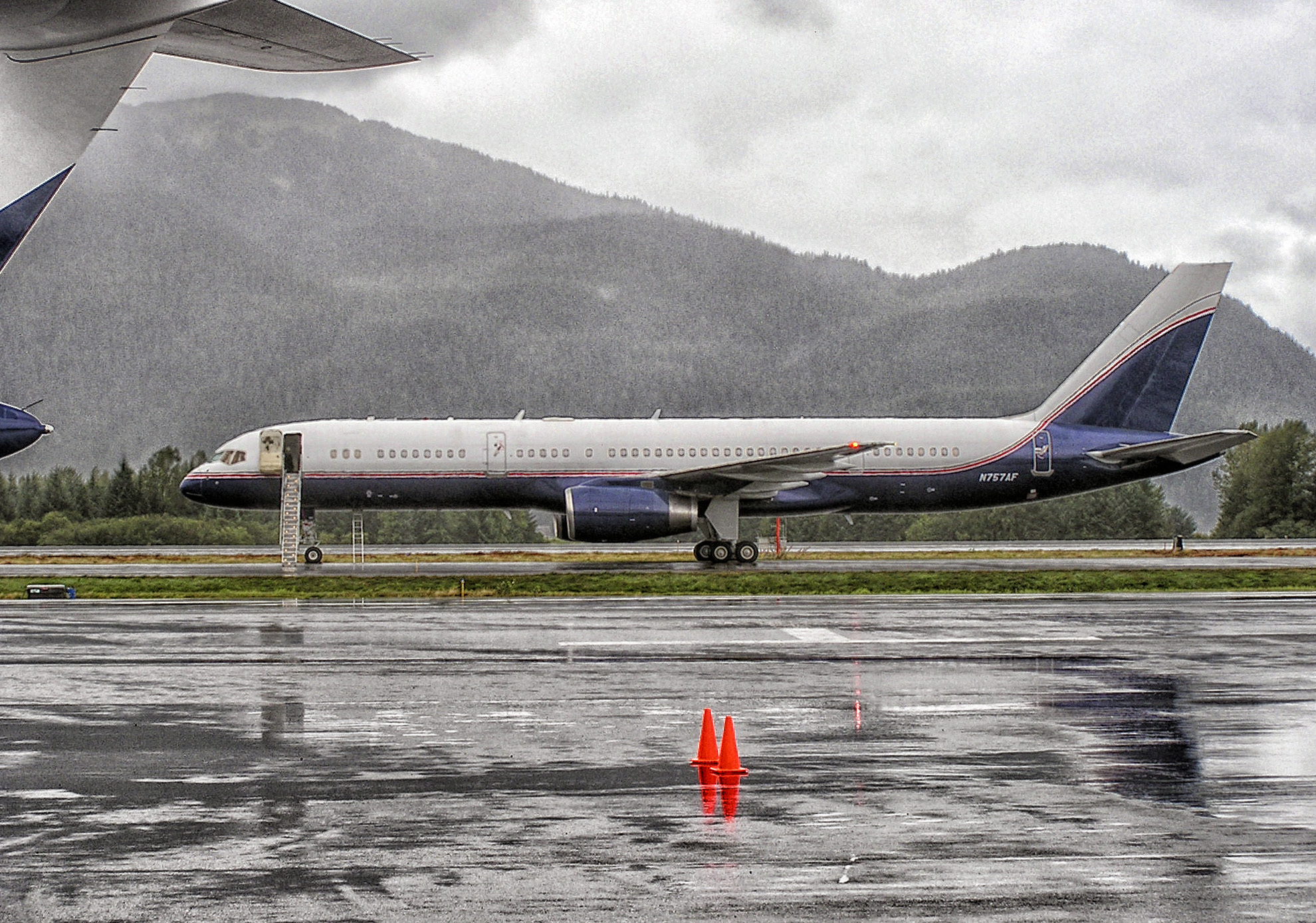
N757AF as Paul Allen's corporate aircraft in 2003

Trump's Boeing 757-200 is registered in the United States as N757AF (ICAO 24-bit address AA3410) and was built in 1991. It was originally delivered to Denmark's Sterling Airlines and by 1993 was operated by Mexico's TAESA. In 1995, it became a corporate jet for Microsoft co-founder Paul Allen's enterprises. Trump's DJT Operations I LLC bought the plane in 2011.

The aircraft has two Rolls-Royce RB211 turbofan engines, and is configured to seat 43 people. It has a dining room, bathroom, shower, bedroom, guest room, and galley. Many fixtures are plated in 24-karat gold.

Donald Trump had planned to use the 757 for campaigning during his exploratory, ultimately abandoned 2012 presidential bid. He used the 757 for transportation during his successful 2016 presidential campaign. After becoming president, he began to travel on the Boeing VC-25s commonly referred to as Air Force One, including the use for transportation during his unsuccessful 2020 presidential campaign.

In December 2017, the aircraft received the call sign 'Tyson 1'.

The Boeing 757 was used by The Trump Organization for executive trips until mid-2019 when it was put into storage on a fenced-off tarmac at Stewart International Airport in Newburgh, New York where it remained until late 2021. The left engine was removed, and there were challenges in finding a replacement/loaner engine. Once an engine was found, the aircraft was scheduled to be flown to a maintenance, repair and overhaul facility (MRO) in Lake Charles, Louisiana, for overdue maintenance.

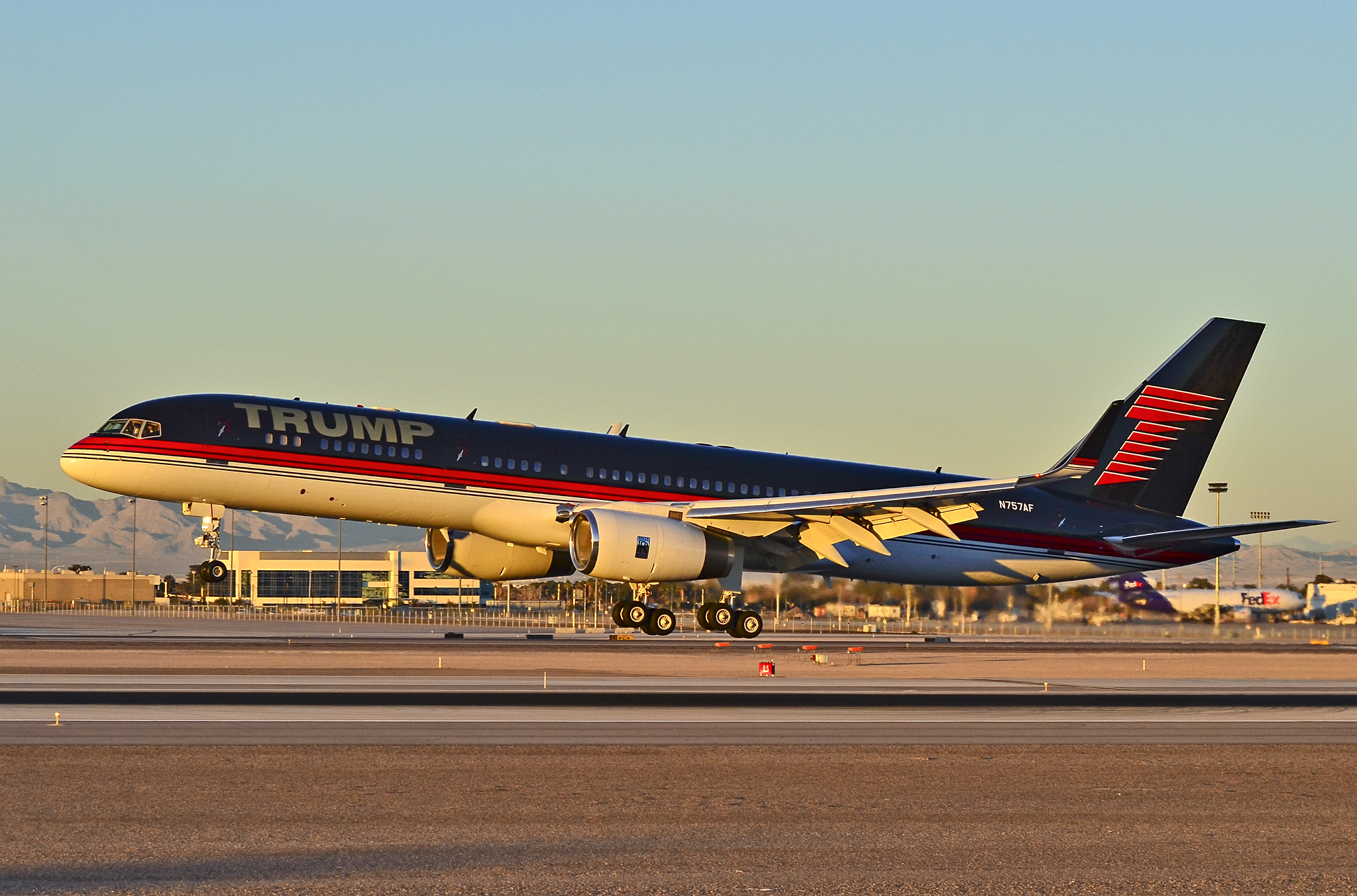
The aircraft landing at McCarran International Airport in Las Vegas in 2014.

On May 21, 2021, Trump announced in a press release that the plane would be restored and upgraded at a service facility in Louisiana. The aircraft was also given an updated livery, with the most noticeable change being a US flag on the tail in place of the original 'T'. It was recommissioned and flown to West Palm Beach, Florida, in October 2022.

The aircraft appeared prominently on television on April 4, 2023, when it took Trump to LaGuardia Airport, New York, for his arraignment in a Manhattan criminal court. Similarly, Trump used the plane to fly to Miami in June 2023 when he was arraigned in federal court, in August 2023 to fly from Newark Liberty International Airport to Washington D.C. for a separate federal arraignment in relation to the 2020 election.

While taxiing at the Palm Beach International Airport during the early hours of May 12, 2024, the plane clipped an unoccupied parked corporate jet.

On August 9, 2024, while en route to Bozeman Yellowstone International Airport for a rally and fundraising stop in Bozeman, Montana, the plane was diverted to Billings Logan International Airport due to a mechanical issue.

== Other aircraft ==
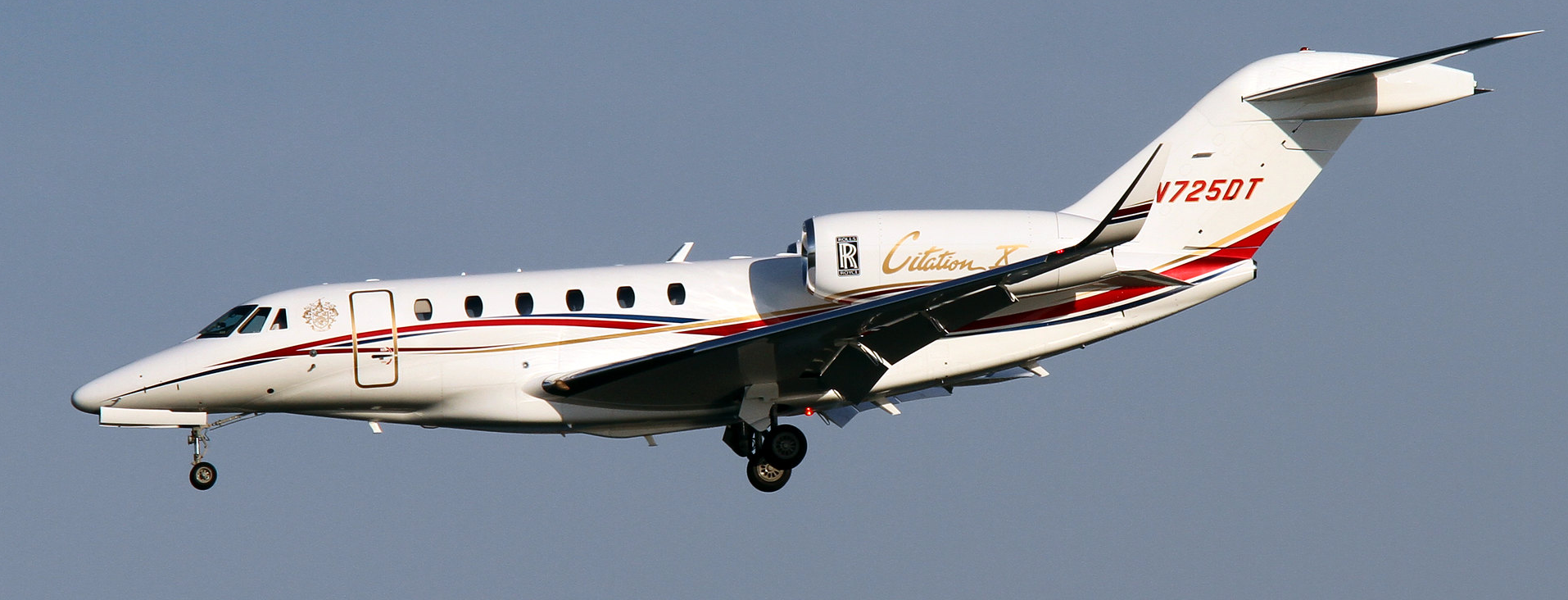
Trump Organization Cessna 750

When Trump visited Trump Tower in Manhattan in March 2021, he used the Trump Organization's 1997 Cessna 750 Citation X, N725DT. The Citation X became Trump's main jet after his first presidency, while his 757 was being renovated. The plane seats eight passengers and has a cabin height of 5 feet 7 inches (170 centimeters). When first purchased, it was the fastest business jet in the world. The Federal Aviation Administration reportedly cited the plane in 2016 when the Trump Organization did not renew its registration. In May 2024, the Trump Organization sold the Cessna to a Texan company, MM Fleet Holdings LLC, for an undisclosed amount. The fair market value of the plane was estimated at $10 million.

The Trump Organization's fleet also has three Sikorsky S-76 helicopters. While the Boeing 757 was grounded for mechanical issues in August 2024, Trump attended campaign events in a Gulfstream G550 leased from Threshold Aviation Group that had previously been owned by Jeffrey Epstein.

In July 2024, Trump's presidential campaign began chartering N917XA, a Boeing 737-800 operated by Eastern Air Express The plane was primarily used by his running mate, JD Vance. On September 5, 2024, the pilot of the aircraft was warned by air traffic control for violating Prohibited Area 56 shortly after takeoff from Ronald Reagan Washington National Airport.

== Documentary ==
- "Trump 757". Mighty Planes. Season 2. Episode 3. June 9, 2013. Discovery Channel Canada. (Trump 757 at IMDb)
